= Hamlet =

Tragedy by William Shakespeare

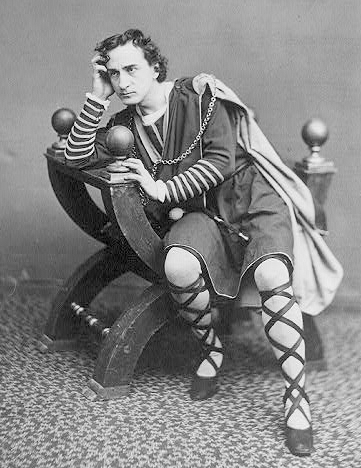
- Hamlet portrayed by Edwin Booth (c. 1870)
- Original language: Early Modern English
- Written by: William Shakespeare
- Based on: Legend of Amleth (Gesta Danorum); The Spanish Tragedy; Ur-Hamlet; See: Sources of Hamlet
- Characters: Hamlet; Claudius; Gertrude; Polonius; Ophelia; Laertes; Horatio
- Genre: Shakespearean tragedy
- Setting: Elsinore, other parts of Denmark

Premiere
- Date: c. 1599–1601

Hamlet (/ˈhæmlɪt/) is a tragedy written by William Shakespeare sometime between 1599 and 1601. It is Shakespeare's longest play. Set in Denmark, the play depicts Prince Hamlet and his attempts to exact revenge against his uncle, Claudius, who has murdered Hamlet's father in order to seize his throne and marry Hamlet's mother.

Hamlet is considered among the "most powerful and influential tragedies in the English language", with a story capable of "seemingly endless retelling and adaptation by others". It is widely considered one of the greatest plays of all time. Three different early versions of the play are extant: the First Quarto (Q1, 1603); the Second Quarto (Q2, 1604); and the First Folio (F1, 1623). Each version includes lines and passages missing from the others. Many works have been pointed to as possible sources for Shakespeare's play, from ancient Greek tragedies to Elizabethan dramas.

== Characters ==
- Hamlet – son of the late king and nephew of the present king, Claudius
- Claudius – King of Denmark, Hamlet's uncle and brother to the former king
- Gertrude – Queen of Denmark and Hamlet's mother
- Polonius – chief counsellor to the king
- Ophelia – Polonius's daughter
- Horatio – friend of Hamlet
- Laertes – Polonius's son
- Voltemand and Cornelius – courtiers
- Rosencrantz and Guildenstern – courtiers, friends of Hamlet
- Osric – a courtier
- Marcellus – an officer
- Bernardo – an officer (spelled Barnardo or Barnard in quarto versions)
- Francisco – a soldier
- Reynaldo – Polonius's servant
- Ghost – the ghost of Hamlet's father, King Hamlet
- Fortinbras – prince of Norway
- Gravediggers – a pair of sextons
- Player King, Player Queen, Lucianus, etc. – players

== Plot ==
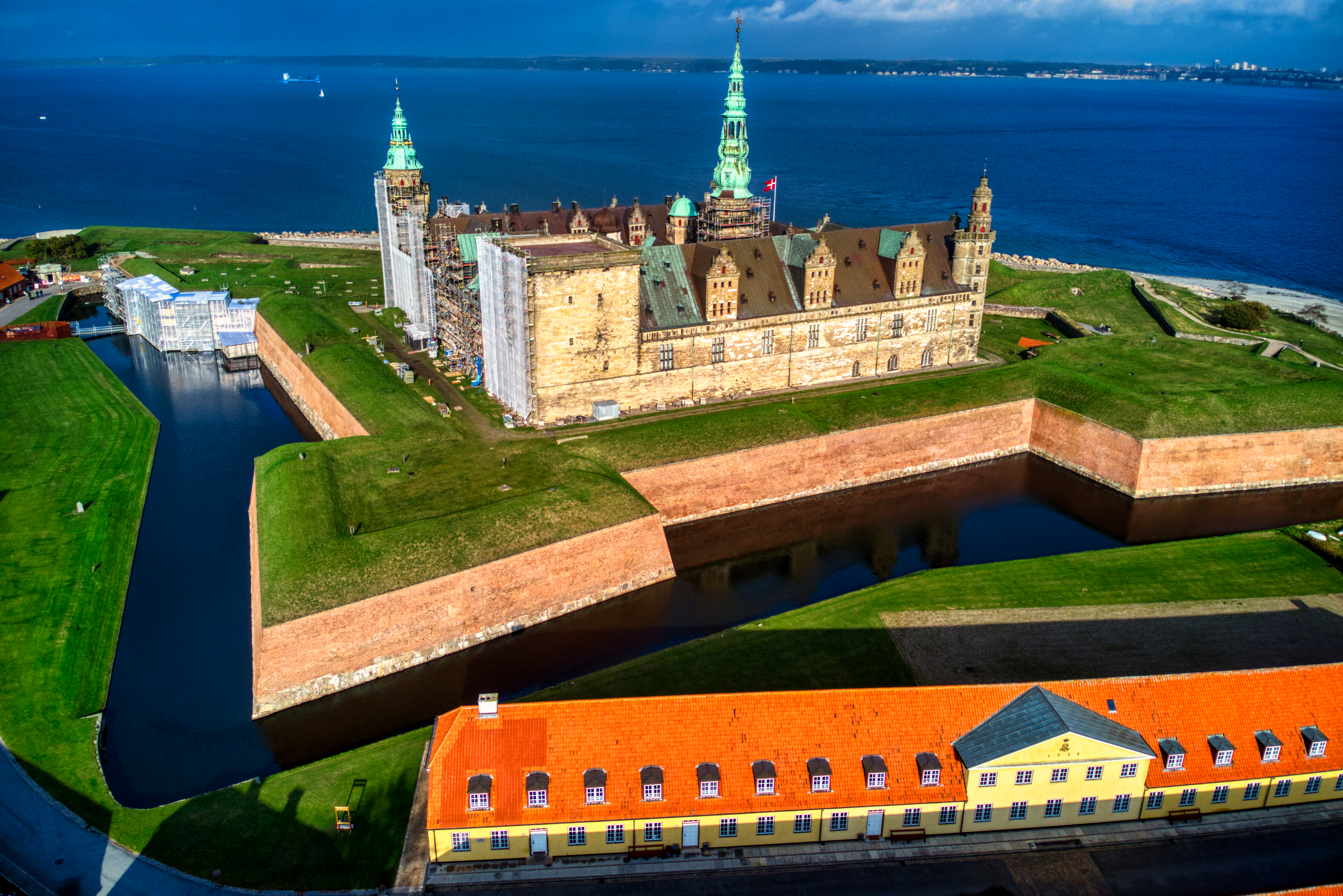
Kronborg Castle is immortalised as Elsinore in the play Hamlet

=== Act I ===
Prince Hamlet of Denmark is the son of the recently deceased King Hamlet and nephew of King Claudius, his father's brother and successor. Claudius married King Hamlet's widow and Prince Hamlet's mother, Gertrude. Denmark has a long-standing feud with neighbouring Norway; Denmark fears an invasion led by the Norwegian king's son, Fortinbras.

Prince Hamlet's friend Horatio, and two sentries, witness the ghost of King Hamlet and resolve to tell Prince Hamlet. The court gathers the next day and Claudius berates Hamlet for continuing to grieve for his father. Hamlet bemoans his father's death and his mother's hasty remarriage. Learning of the ghost from Horatio, Hamlet resolves to see it himself.

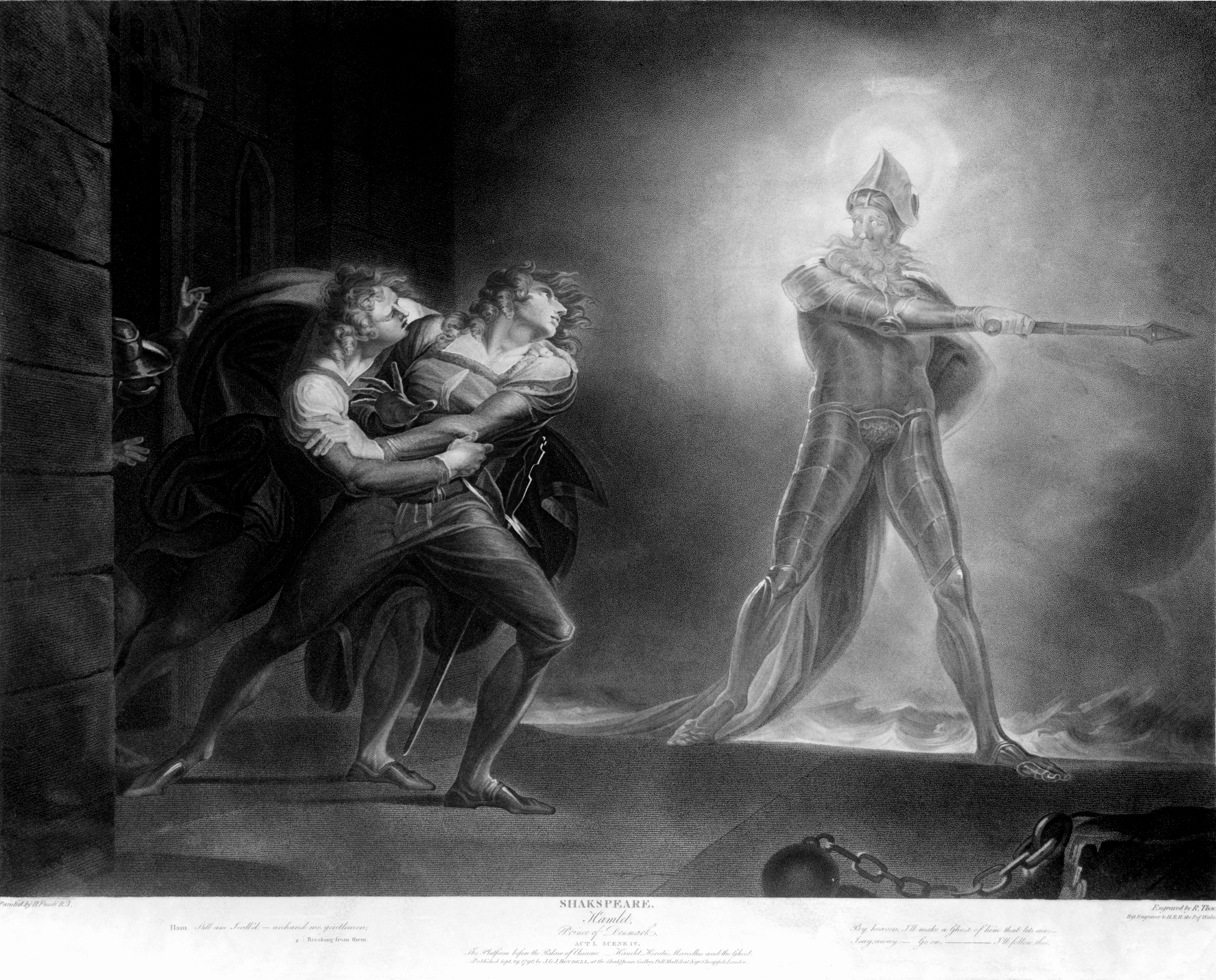
Horatio, Hamlet, and the ghost (Artist: Henry Fuseli, 1789) (Note: Hamlet 1.4.)

Ophelia has been wooed by Hamlet. Her brother Laertes, who is leaving for France, warns her against returning Hamlet's affection, and then her father Polonius orders her to reject Hamlet's advances. That night, the ghost appears to Hamlet and tells him that he was murdered by Claudius: demanding that Hamlet avenge him, which Hamlet vows to do. The prince confides to Horatio that he plans to act as though he has gone mad and swears Horatio and the sentries to secrecy. Hamlet remains uncertain of the ghost's reliability.

=== Act II ===
Ophelia tells Polonius that Hamlet had appeared at her chamber and behaved erratically; Polonius concludes that Hamlet's madness is due to love. Meanwhile Fortinbras has been ordered by Norway to abandon an invasion of Denmark but requests passage through Denmark for a march on Poland.

Polonius speaks to Hamlet and the latter feigns madness. Rosencrantz and Guildenstern, two of Hamlet's friends, arrive; Hamlet discerns that they are there to spy on him. Rosencrantz and Guildenstern tell Hamlet that they have brought a troupe of actors. Hamlet asks the actors to stage The Murder of Gonzago, a play featuring a death in the style of his father's murder. Hamlet intends to study Claudius's reaction to the play and determine the truth of the ghost's story.

=== Act III ===
Polonius orders Ophelia to return Hamlet's love tokens, while he and Claudius secretly watch to evaluate Hamlet's reaction. Hamlet accuses Ophelia of immodesty, denying he ever loved her, convincing Claudius that Hamlet is not mad for love. The court assembles to watch the play Hamlet has commissioned, and Claudius abruptly rises and runs from the room which, for Hamlet, proves his uncle's guilt.

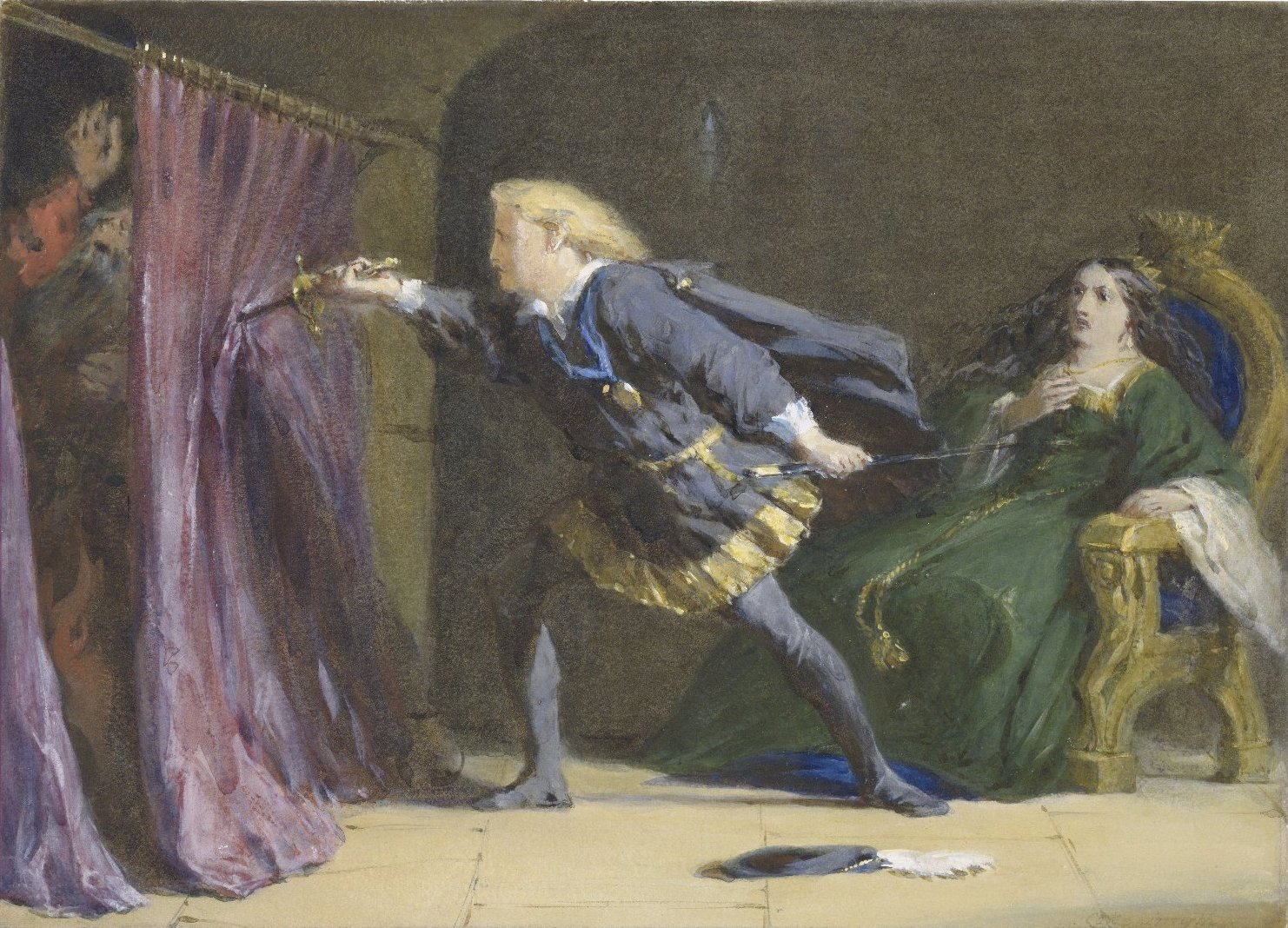
Hamlet mistakenly stabs Polonius (Artist: Coke Smyth, 19th century).

Claudius tries to pray, but cannot repent. Hamlet sneaks behind Claudius but does not kill him, reasoning that killing him at prayer will send him to heaven. In the queen's bedchamber, Hamlet and Gertrude fight. Polonius, who is spying on the conversation behind an arras, calls for help and Hamlet stabs wildly, killing Polonius. Hamlet brutally insults his mother, but the ghost enters and reprimands Hamlet for his harsh words. Unable to see or hear the ghost, Gertrude takes Hamlet's conversation as further evidence of madness.

=== Act IV and V ===
The king sends Rosencrantz and Guildenstern to accompany Hamlet to England with a sealed letter to the English king requesting that Hamlet be executed. Ophelia is driven mad by her father's death. Laertes arrives back from France, enraged, and witnesses Ophelia's madness. Claudius convinces Laertes that Hamlet is responsible. A letter arrives indicating that Hamlet has returned to Denmark. Claudius proposes a fencing match between Laertes and Hamlet. Laertes will be given a poison-tipped foil, and, if that fails, Claudius will offer Hamlet poisoned wine. Gertrude arrives with news that Ophelia has drowned.

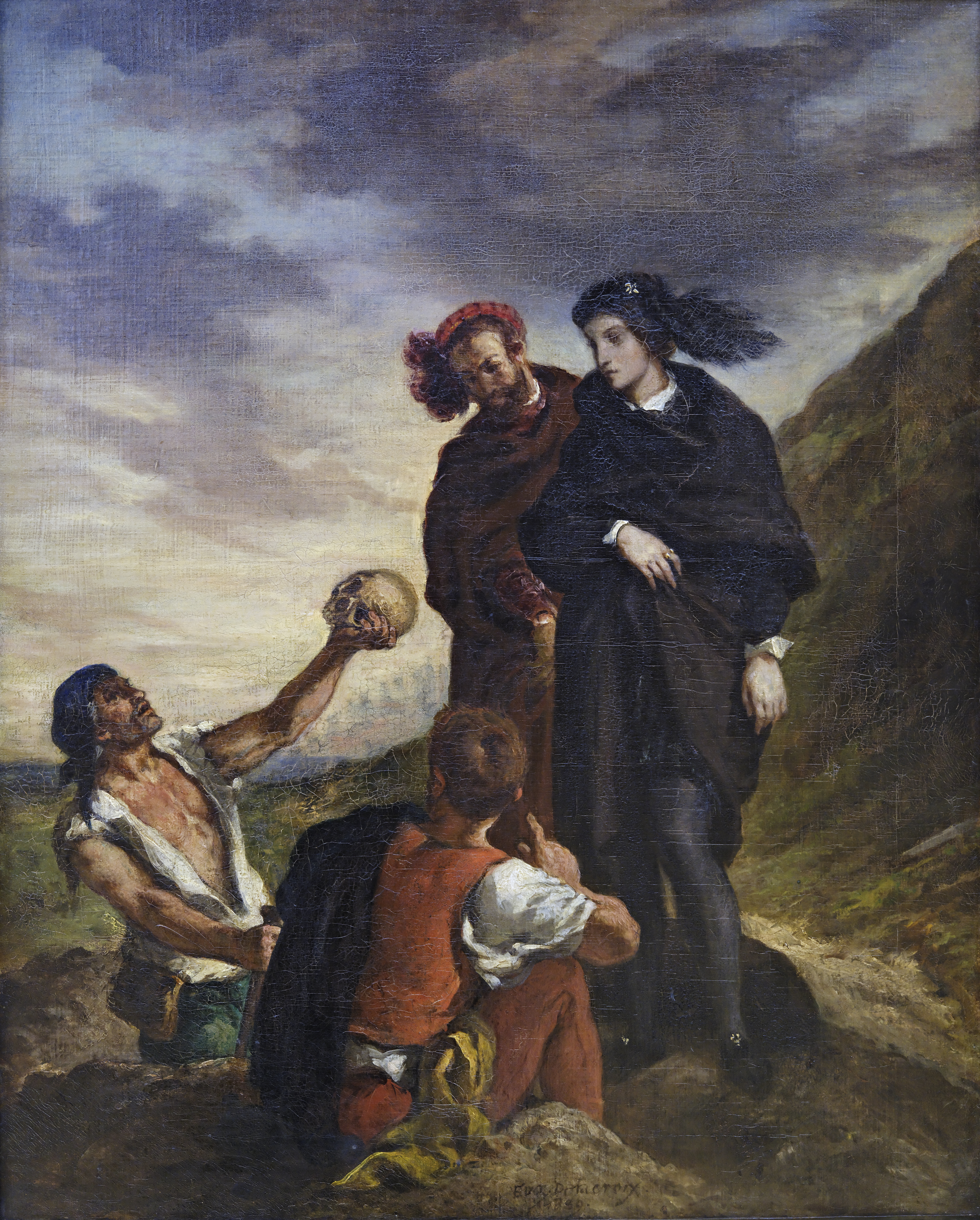
The gravedigger scene. (Note: Hamlet 5.1.1–205) (Artist: Eugène Delacroix, 1839)

Hamlet and Horatio happen upon Ophelia's funeral, and Laertes and Hamlet fight. Back at the castle, Hamlet agrees to the fencing challenge from Laertes. Gertrude raises a toast to him using the poisoned wine. Claudius tries to stop her but she drinks. Laertes then slashes Hamlet with his poisoned blade. In the ensuing scuffle, they switch weapons, and Hamlet wounds Laertes. Gertrude dies and Laertes reveals Claudius's plan. Hamlet kills Claudius. Hamlet dies in Horatio's arms, naming Fortinbras as his successor.

== Sources ==
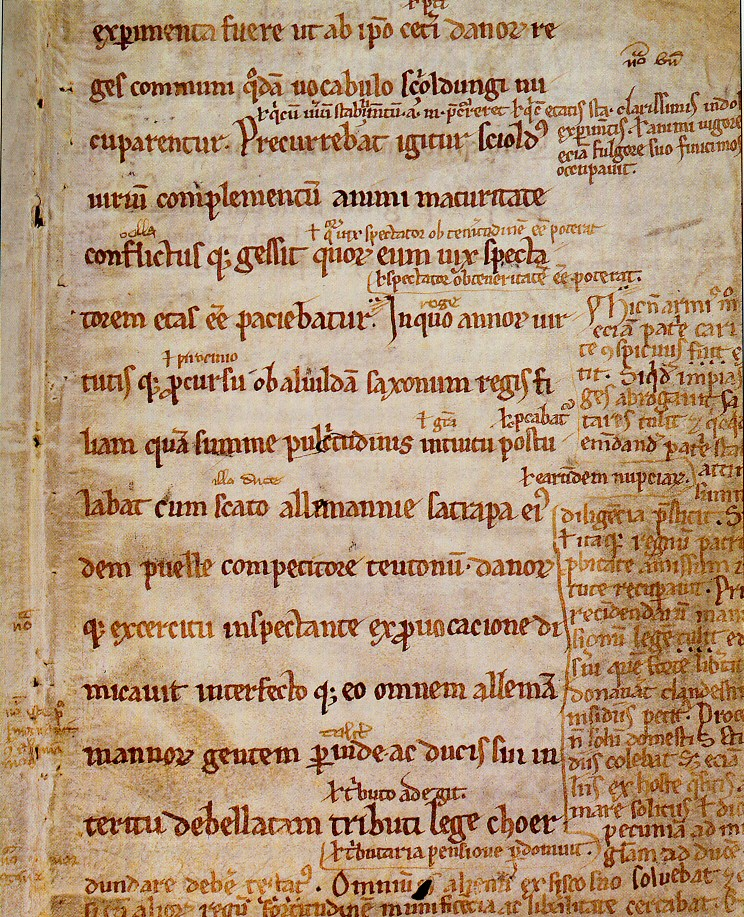
A facsimile of Gesta Danorum by Saxo Grammaticus, which contains the legend of Amleth

Hamlet-like legends are so widely found (for example in Italy, Spain, Scandinavia, Byzantium, and Arabia) that the core "hero-as-fool" theme is possibly Indo-European in origin. Several ancient written precursors to Hamlet can be identified. The first is the anonymous Scandinavian Saga of Hrolf Kraki. In this, the murdered king has two sons—Hroar and Helgi—who spend most of the story in disguise, under false names, rather than feigning madness, in a sequence of events that differs from Shakespeare's. The second is the Roman legend of Brutus, recorded in two separate Latin works. Its hero, Lucius ("shining, light"), changes his name and persona to Brutus ("dull, stupid"), playing the role of a fool to avoid the fate of his father and brothers, and eventually slaying his family's killer, King Tarquinius. A 17th-century Nordic scholar, Torfaeus, compared the Icelandic hero Amlóði (Amlodi) and the hero Prince Ambales (from the Ambales Saga) to Shakespeare's Hamlet. Similarities include the prince's feigned madness, his accidental killing of the king's counsellor in his mother's bedroom, and the eventual slaying of his uncle.

Many of the earlier legendary elements are interwoven in the 13th-century "Life of Amleth" (Latin: Vita Amlethi) by Saxo Grammaticus, part of Gesta Danorum. Written in Latin, it reflects classical Roman concepts of virtue and heroism, and was widely available in Shakespeare's day. Significant parallels include the prince feigning madness, his mother's hasty marriage to the usurper, the prince killing a hidden spy, and the prince substituting the execution of two retainers for his own. A reasonably faithful version of Saxo's story was translated into French in 1570 by François de Belleforest, in his Histoires tragiques. Belleforest embellished Saxo's text substantially, almost doubling its length, and introduced the hero's melancholy.

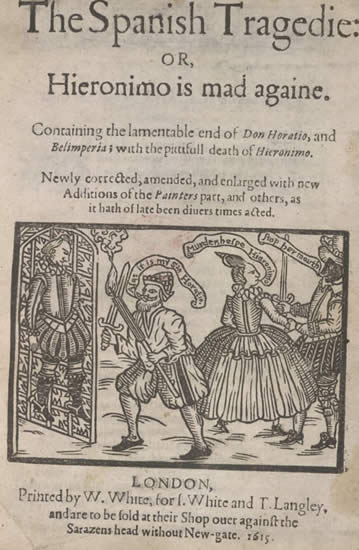
Title page of The Spanish Tragedy by Thomas Kyd

According to one theory, Shakespeare's main source may be an earlier play—now lost—known today as the Ur-Hamlet. Possibly written by Thomas Kyd or by Shakespeare, the Ur-Hamlet would have existed by 1589, and would have incorporated a ghost. Shakespeare's company, the Chamberlain's Men, may have purchased that play and performed a version for some time, which Shakespeare reworked. However, no copy of the Ur-Hamlet has survived, and it is impossible to compare its language and style with the known works of any of its putative authors. In 1936 Andrew Cairncross suggested that, until more becomes known, it may be assumed that Shakespeare wrote the Ur-Hamlet. Eric Sams lists reasons for supporting Shakespeare's authorship. Harold Jenkins considers that there are no grounds for thinking that the Ur-Hamlet is an early work by Shakespeare, which he then rewrote. Professor Terri Bourus in 2016, one of three general editors of the New Oxford Shakespeare, in her paper "Enter Shakespeare's Young Hamlet, 1589" suggests that Shakespeare was "interested in sixteenth-century French literature, from the very beginning of his career" and therefore "did not need Thomas Kyd to pre-digest Belleforest's histoire of Amleth and spoon-feed it to him". She considers that the hypothesised Ur-Hamlet is Shakespeare's Q1 text, and that this derived directly from Belleforest's French version.

The precise combination of Shakespeare's use of the Ur-Hamlet, Belleforest, Saxo, or Kyd's The Spanish Tragedy as sources for Hamlet is not known. However, elements of Belleforest's version which are not in Saxo's story do appear in Shakespeare's play.

Scholars have tried to avoid overtly biographical readings of Hamlet which connect the play to Shakespeare's only son, Hamnet Shakespeare, who died in 1596 at age eleven. Conventional wisdom holds that Hamlet is strongly connected to legend, and the name Hamnet was quite popular at the time. However, Stephen Greenblatt has argued that the coincidence of the names and Shakespeare's grief for the loss of his son may lie at the heart of the tragedy. He notes that the name of Hamnet Sadler, the Stratford neighbour after whom Hamnet was named, was often written as Hamlet Sadler and that, in the loose orthography of the time, the names were virtually interchangeable.

Scholars have often speculated that Hamlet's Polonius might have been inspired by William Cecil (Lord Burghley)—Lord High Treasurer and chief counsellor to Queen Elizabeth I. E. K. Chambers suggested Polonius's advice to Laertes may have echoed Burghley's to his son Robert Cecil. John Dover Wilson thought it almost certain that the figure of Polonius caricatured Burghley. A. L. Rowse speculated that Polonius's tedious verbosity might have resembled Burghley's. Lilian Winstanley thought the name Corambis (in the First Quarto) did suggest Cecil and Burghley. Harold Jenkins considers the idea of Polonius as a caricature of Burghley to be conjecture, perhaps based on the similar role they each played at court, and perhaps also based on the similarity between Burghley addressing his Ten Precepts to his son, and Polonius offering "precepts" to his son, Laertes. Jenkins suggests that any personal satire may be found in the name "Polonius", which might point to a Polish or Polonian connection. G. R. Hibbard hypothesised that differences in names (Corambis/Polonius:Montano/Raynoldo) between the First Quarto and other editions might reflect a desire not to offend scholars at Oxford University. (Robert Pullen was the founder of Oxford University, and John Rainolds was the president of Corpus Christi College.)

== Date ==
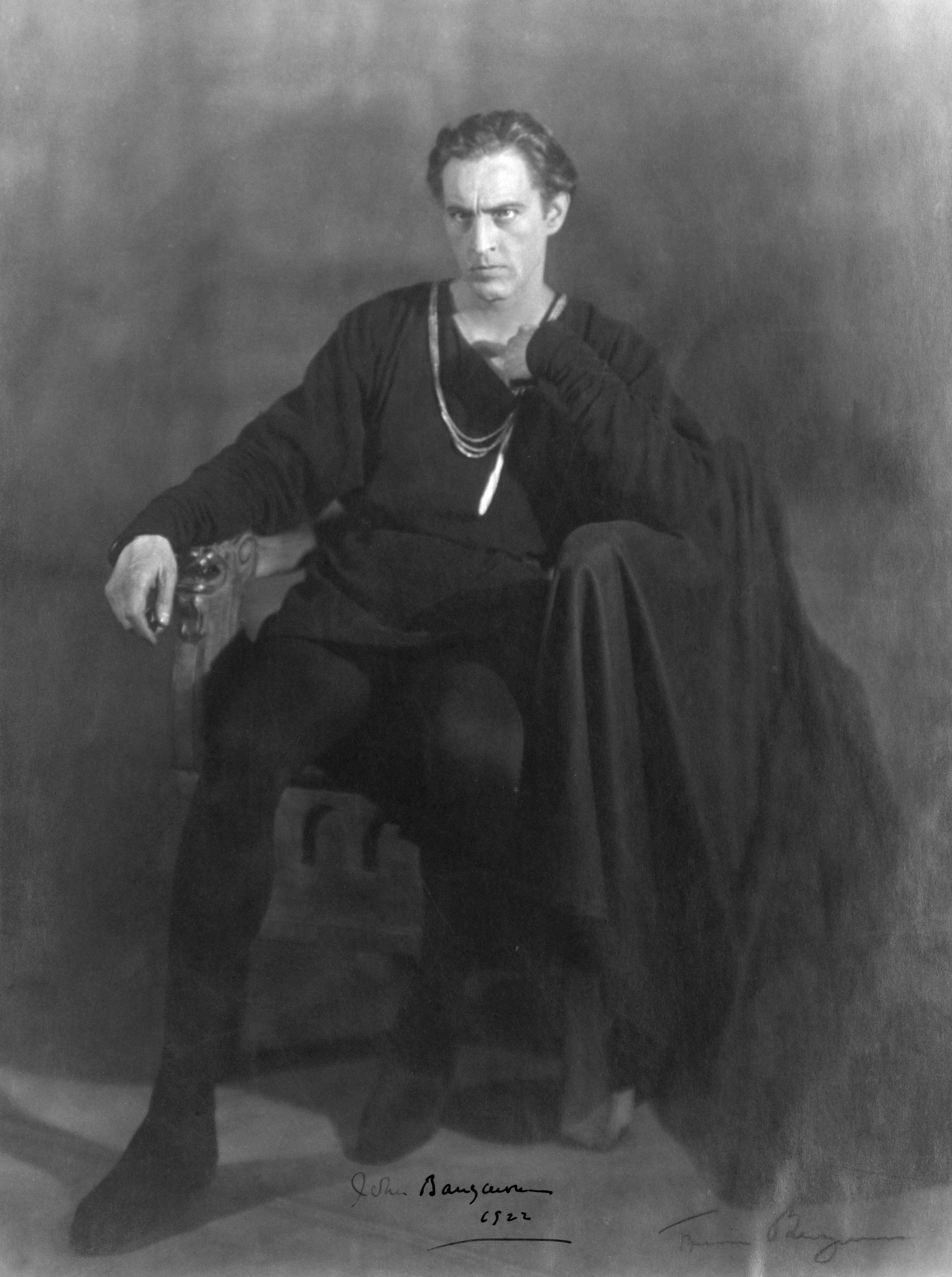
John Barrymore as Hamlet (1922)

"Any dating of Hamlet must be tentative", states the New Cambridge editor, Phillip Edwards. MacCary suggests 1599 or 1600; James S. Shapiro offers late 1600 or early 1601; Wells and Taylor suggest that the play was written in 1600 and revised later; the New Cambridge editor settles on mid-1601; the New Swan Shakespeare Advanced Series editor agrees with 1601; Thompson and Taylor, tentatively ("according to whether one is the more persuaded by Jenkins or by Honigmann") suggest a terminus ad quem of either spring 1601 or sometime in 1600.

The earliest date estimate relies on Hamlet's frequent allusions to Shakespeare's Julius Caesar, itself dated to mid-1599. The latest date estimate is based on an entry, of 26 July 1602, in the Register of the Stationers' Company, indicating that Hamlet was "latelie Acted by the Lo: Chamberleyne his servantes".

In 1598, Francis Meres published his Palladis Tamia, a survey of English literature from Chaucer to its present day, within which twelve of Shakespeare's plays are named. Hamlet is not among them, suggesting that it had not yet been written. As Hamlet was very popular, Bernard Lott, the series editor of New Swan, believes it "unlikely that he [Meres] would have overlooked ... so significant a piece".

The phrase "little eyases" (Note: Hamlet F1 2.2.337.) in the First Folio (F1) may allude to the Children of the Chapel, whose popularity in London forced the Globe company into provincial touring. (Note: Hamlet F1 2.2.324–360) This became known as the War of the Theatres, and supports a 1601 dating. Katherine Duncan-Jones accepts a 1600–01 attribution for the date Hamlet was written, but notes that the Lord Chamberlain's Men, playing Hamlet in the 3000-capacity Globe, were unlikely to be put to any disadvantage by an audience of "barely one hundred" for the Children of the chapel's equivalent play, Antonio's Revenge; she believes that Shakespeare, confident in the superiority of his own work, was making a playful and charitable allusion to his friend John Marston's very similar piece.

A contemporary of Shakespeare's, Gabriel Harvey, wrote a marginal note in his copy of the 1598 edition of Chaucer's works, which some scholars use as dating evidence. Harvey's note says that "the wiser sort" enjoy Hamlet, and implies that the Earl of Essex—executed in February 1601 for rebellion—was still alive. Other scholars consider this inconclusive. Edwards, for example, concludes that the "sense of time is so confused in Harvey's note that it is really of little use in trying to date Hamlet". This is because the same note also refers to Spenser and Watson as if they were still alive ("our flourishing metricians"), but also mentions "Owen's new epigrams", published in 1607.

== Texts ==
Three early editions of the text, each different, have survived, making attempts to establish a single "authentic" text problematic.

- First Quarto (Q1): In 1603 the booksellers Nicholas Ling and John Trundell published, and Valentine Simmes printed, the so-called "bad" first quarto, under the name The Tragicall Historie of Hamlet Prince of Denmarke. Q1 contains just over half of the text of the later second quarto.
- Second Quarto (Q2): In 1604 Nicholas Ling published, and James Roberts printed, the second quarto, under the same name as the first. Some copies are dated 1605, which may indicate a second impression; consequently, Q2 is often dated "1604/5". Q2 is the longest early edition, although it omits about 77 lines found in F1 (most likely to avoid offending James I's queen, Anne of Denmark).
- First Folio (F1): In 1623 Edward Blount and William and Isaac Jaggard published The Tragedie of Hamlet, Prince of Denmarke in the First Folio, the first edition of Shakespeare's Complete Works.

This list does not include three additional early texts, John Smethwick's Q3, Q4, and Q5 (1611–37), which are regarded as reprints of Q2 with some alterations.

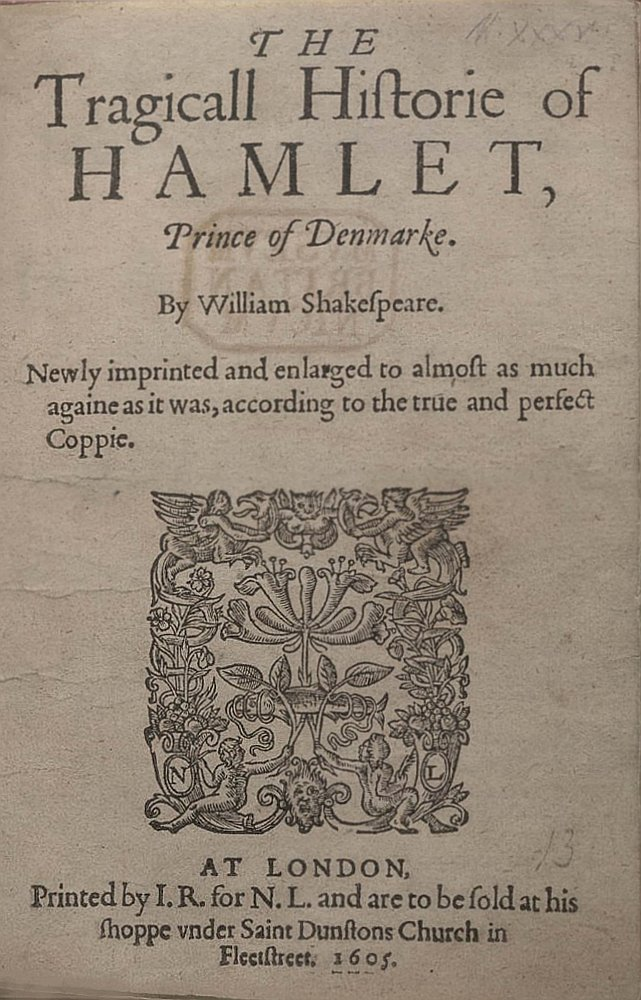
Title page of the 1605 printing (Q2) of Hamlet

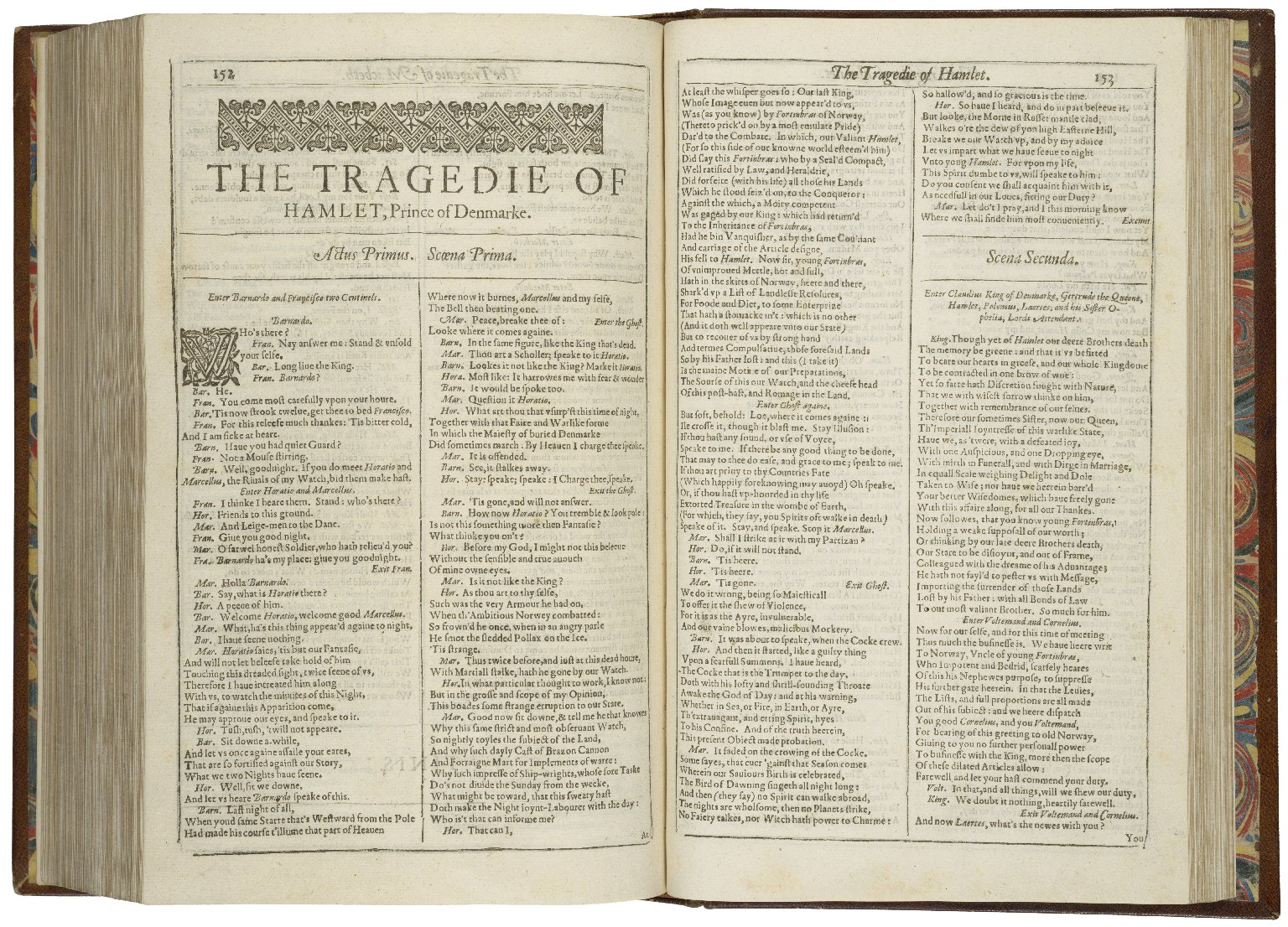
The first page of the First Folio printing of Hamlet, 1623

Early editors of Shakespeare's works, beginning with Nicholas Rowe (1709) and Lewis Theobald (1733), combined material from the two earliest sources of Hamlet available at the time, Q2 and F1. Each text contains material that the other lacks, with many minor differences in wording: scarcely 200 lines are identical in the two. Editors have combined them in an effort to create one "inclusive" text that reflects an imagined "ideal" of Shakespeare's original. Theobald's version became standard for a long time, and his "full text" approach continues to influence editorial practice to the present day. Some contemporary scholarship, however, discounts this approach, instead considering "an authentic Hamlet an unrealisable ideal. ... there are texts of this play but no text". The 2006 publication by Arden Shakespeare of different Hamlet texts in different volumes is perhaps evidence of this shifting focus and emphasis. (Note: The Arden Shakespeare third series published Q2, with appendices, in their first volume, and the F1 and Q1 texts in their second volume. The RSC Shakespeare is the F1 text with additional Q2 passages in an appendix. The New Cambridge Shakespeare series has begun to publish separate volumes for the separate quarto versions that exist of Shakespeare's plays.) Other editors have continued to argue the need for well-edited editions taking material from all versions of the play. Colin Burrow has argued that

most of us should read a text that is made up by conflating all three versions ... it's about as likely that Shakespeare wrote: "To be or not to be, ay, there's the point" [in Q1], as that he wrote the works of Francis Bacon. I suspect most people just won't want to read a three-text play ... [multi-text editions are] a version of the play that is out of touch with the needs of a wider public.

Traditionally, editors of Shakespeare's plays have divided them into five acts. None of the early texts of Hamlet, however, were arranged this way, and the play's division into acts and scenes derives from a 1676 quarto. Modern editors generally follow this traditional division but consider it unsatisfactory; for example, after Hamlet drags Polonius's body out of Gertrude's bedchamber, there is an act-break (Note: Hamlet Hamlet 3.4 and 4.1.) after which the action appears to continue uninterrupted.

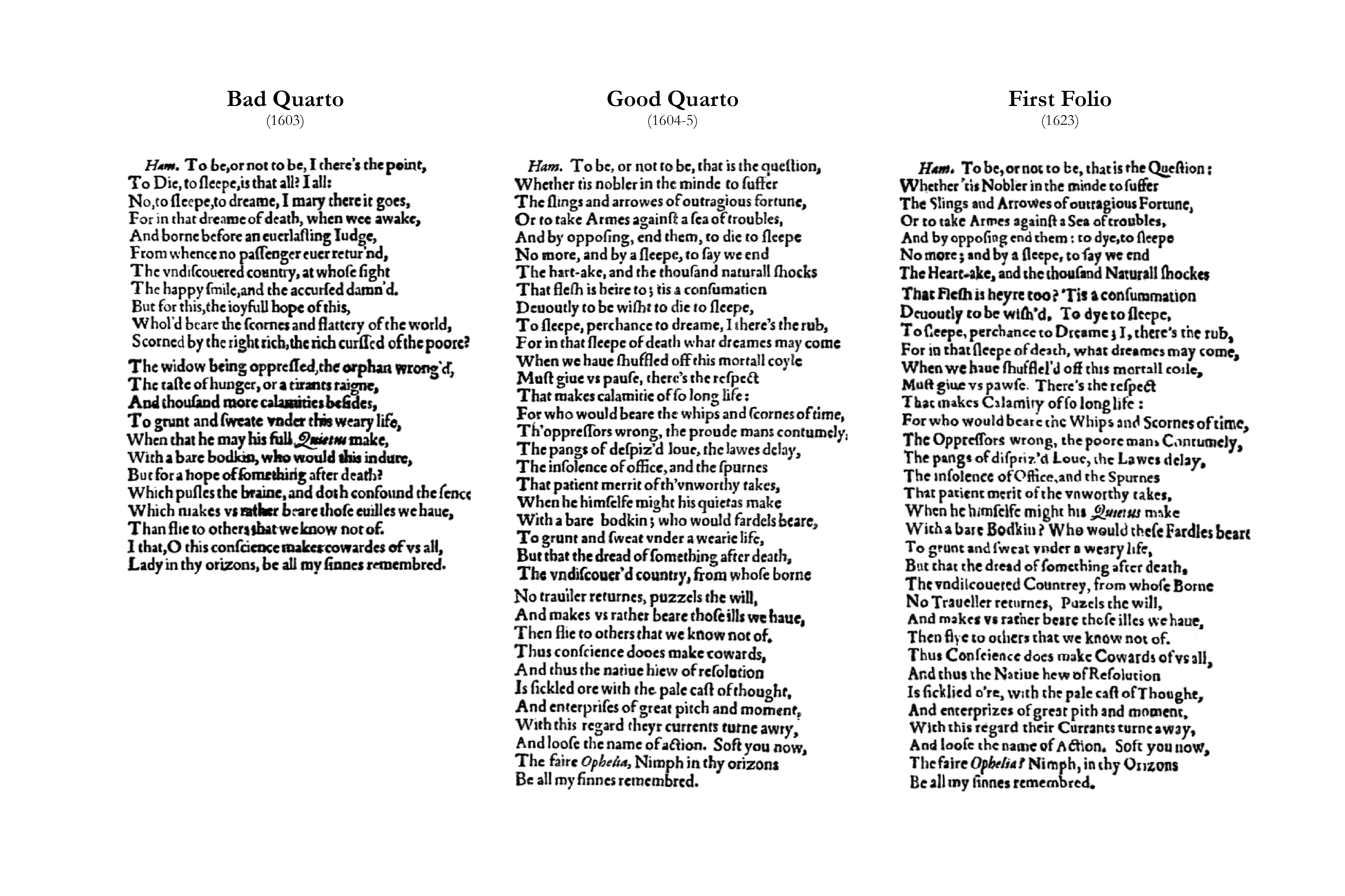
Comparison of the 'To be, or not to be' soliloquy in the first three editions of Hamlet, showing the varying quality of the text in the Bad Quarto, the Good Quarto and the First Folio

Q1 was discovered in 1823. Only two copies are extant. According to Jenkins, "The unauthorized nature of this quarto is matched by the corruption of its text." Yet Q1 has value: it contains stage directions (such as Ophelia entering with a lute and her hair down) that reveal actual stage practices in a way that Q2 and F1 do not; it contains an entire scene (usually labelled 4.6) (Note: Hamlet Q1 14.) that does not appear in either Q2 or F1; and it is useful for comparison with the later editions. The major deficiency of Q1 is in the language: particularly noticeable in the opening lines of the famous "To be, or not to be" soliloquy: "To be, or not to be, aye there's the point. / To die, to sleep, is that all? Aye all: / No, to sleep, to dream, aye marry there it goes." However, the scene order is more coherent, without the problems of Q2 and F1 of Hamlet seeming to resolve something in one scene and enter the next drowning in indecision. New Cambridge editor Kathleen Irace has noted that "Q1's more linear plot design is certainly easier [...] to follow [...] but the simplicity of the Q1 plot arrangement eliminates the alternating plot elements that correspond to Hamlet's shifts in mood."

Q1 is considerably shorter than Q2 or F1 and may be a memorial reconstruction of the play as Shakespeare's company performed it, by an actor who played a minor role (most likely Marcellus). Scholars disagree whether the reconstruction was pirated or authorised. It is suggested by Irace that Q1 is an abridged version intended especially for travelling productions, thus the question of length may be considered as separate from issues of poor textual quality. Editing Q1 thus poses problems in whether or not to "correct" differences from Q2 and F. Irace, in her introduction to Q1, wrote that "I have avoided as many other alterations as possible, because the differences...are especially intriguing...I have recorded a selection of Q2/F readings in the collation." The idea that Q1 is not riddled with error but is instead eminently fit for the stage has led to at least 28 different Q1 productions since 1881. Other productions have used the Q2 and Folio texts, but used Q1's running order, in particular moving the to be or not to be soliloquy earlier. Developing this, some editors such as Jonathan Bate have argued that Q2 may represent "a 'reading' text as opposed to a 'performance' one" of Hamlet: an edition containing all of Shakespeare's material for the play for the pleasure of readers, so not representing the play as it would have been staged.

== Analysis and criticism ==
=== Critical history ===
From the early 17th century, the play was famous for its ghost and vivid dramatisation of melancholy and insanity, leading to a procession of mad courtiers and ladies in Jacobean and Caroline drama. Though it remained popular with mass audiences, late 17th-century Restoration critics saw Hamlet as primitive and disapproved of its lack of unity and decorum. This view changed drastically in the 18th century, when critics regarded Hamlet as a hero—a pure, brilliant young man thrust into unfortunate circumstances.

By the mid-18th century, however, the advent of Gothic literature brought psychological and mystical readings, returning madness and the ghost to the forefront. Not until the late 18th century did critics and performers begin to view Hamlet as confusing and inconsistent. Before then, he was either mad, or not; either a hero, or not; with no in-betweens. These developments represented a fundamental change in literary criticism, which came to focus more on character and less on plot. The French philosopher Voltaire published a harsh criticism of Hamlet, which offended his neoclassical principles. He described it as a "vulgar and barbarous drama" and particularly took exception to its gravedigger scene, although he also conceded that it contains "some sublime passages, worthy of the greatest genius".

By the 19th century, Romantic critics valued Hamlet for its internal, individual conflict reflecting the strong contemporary emphasis on internal struggles and inner character in general. Then too, critics started to focus on Hamlet's delay as a character trait, rather than a plot device. This focus on character and internal struggle continued into the 20th century; additional perspectives can be found in context and interpretation below.

=== Dramatic structure ===
Modern editors have divided the play into five acts, and each act into scenes. The First Folio marks the first two acts only. The quartos do not have such divisions. The division into five acts follows Seneca, who in his plays, regularised the way ancient Greek tragedies contain five episodes, which are separated by four choral odes. In Hamlet the development of the plot or the action are determined by the unfolding of Hamlet's character. The soliloquies do not interrupt the plot, instead they are highlights of each block of action. The plot is the developing revelation of Hamlet's view of what is "rotten in the state of Denmark". The action of the play is driven forward in dialogue; but in the soliloquies time and action stop, the meaning of action is questioned, fog of illusion is broached, and truths are exposed.

The contrast between appearance and reality is a significant theme. Hamlet is presented with an image, and then interprets its deeper or darker meaning. Examples begin with Hamlet questioning the reality of the ghost. It continues with Hamlet's taking on an "antic disposition" in order to appear mad, though he is not. The contrast (appearance and reality) is also expressed in several "spying scenes": Act two begins with Polonius sending Reynaldo to spy on his son, Laertes. Claudius and Polonius spy on Ophelia as she meets with Hamlet. In act two, Claudius asks Rosencrantz and Guildenstern to spy on Hamlet. Similarly, the play-within-a-play is used by Hamlet to reveal his step-father's hidden nature.

There is no subplot, but the play presents the affairs of the courtier Polonius, his daughter, Ophelia, and his son, Laertes—who variously deal with madness, love and the death of a father in ways that contrast with Hamlet's. The graveyard scene eases tension prior to the catastrophe, and, as Hamlet holds the skull, it is shown that Hamlet no longer fears damnation in the afterlife, and accepts that there is a "divinity that shapes our ends".

Hamlet's enquiring mind has been open to all kinds of ideas, but in act five he has decided on a plan, and in a dialogue with Horatio he seems to answer his two earlier soliloquies on suicide: "We defy augury. There is special providence in the fall of a sparrow. If it be now, 'tis not to come; if it be not to come, it will be now; if it be not now, yet it will come. The readiness is all. Since no man, of aught he leaves, knows aught, what is't to leave betimes." (Note: Hamlet. 5.2.215–220.)

=== Length ===
The First Quarto (1603) text of Hamlet contains 15,983 words, the Second Quarto (1604) contains 28,628 words, and the First Folio (1623) contains 27,602 words. Counting the number of lines varies between editions, partly because prose sections in the play may be formatted with varied lengths. Editions of Hamlet that are created by conflating the texts of the Second Quarto and the Folio are said to have approximately 3,900 lines; the number of lines varies between those editions based on formatting the prose sections, counting methods, and how the editors have joined the texts together. Hamlet is by far the longest play that Shakespeare wrote, and one of the longest plays in the Western canon. It might require more than four hours to stage; a typical Elizabethan play would need two to three hours. It is speculated that because of the considerable length of Q2 and F1, there was an expectation that those texts would be abridged for performance, or that Q2 and F1 may have been aimed at a reading audience.

That Q1 is so much shorter than Q2 has spurred speculation that Q1 is an early draft, or perhaps an adaptation, a bootleg copy, or a stage adaptation. On the title page of Q2, its text is described as "newly imprinted and enlarged to almost as much again as it was". That is probably a comparison to Q1.

=== Language ===
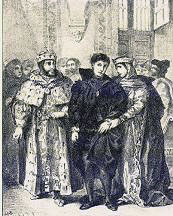
Hamlet's statement that his dark clothes are the outer sign of his inner grief demonstrates strong rhetorical skill (artist: Eugène Delacroix 1834).

Much of Hamlet's language is courtly: elaborate, witty discourse, as recommended by Baldassare Castiglione's 1528 etiquette guide, The Courtier. This work specifically advises royal retainers to amuse their masters with inventive language. Osric and Polonius, especially, seem to respect this injunction. Claudius's speech is rich with rhetorical figures—as is Hamlet's and, at times, Ophelia's—while the language of Horatio, the guards, and the gravediggers is simpler. Claudius's high status is reinforced by using the royal first person plural ("we" or "us"), and anaphora mixed with metaphor to resonate with Greek political speeches.

Of all the characters, Hamlet has the greatest rhetorical skill. He uses highly developed metaphors, stichomythia, and in nine memorable words deploys both anaphora and asyndeton: "to die: to sleep— / To sleep, perchance to dream". (Note: Hamlet 3.1.63–64.) In contrast, when occasion demands, he is precise and straightforward, as when he explains his inward emotion to his mother: "But I have that within which passes show, / These but the trappings and the suits of woe". (Note: Hamlet 1.2.85–86.) At times, he relies heavily on puns to express his true thoughts while simultaneously concealing them. Pauline Kiernan argues that Shakespeare changed English drama forever in Hamlet because he "showed how a character's language can often be saying several things at once, and contradictory meanings at that, to reflect fragmented thoughts and disturbed feelings". She gives the example of Hamlet's advice to Ophelia, "get thee to a nunnery", (Note: Hamlet 3.1.87–160.) which, she claims, is simultaneously a reference to a place of chastity and a slang term for a brothel, reflecting Hamlet's confused feelings about female sexuality. However Harold Jenkins does not agree, having studied the few examples that are used to support that idea, and finds that there is no support for the assumption that "nunnery" was used that way in slang, or that Hamlet intended such a meaning. The context of the scene suggests that a nunnery would not be a brothel, but instead a place of renunciation and a "sanctuary from marriage and from the world's contamination". Thompson and Taylor consider the brothel idea incorrect considering that "Hamlet is trying to deter Ophelia from breeding".

Hamlet's first words in the play are a pun; when Claudius addresses him as "my cousin Hamlet, and my son", Hamlet says as an aside: "A little more than kin, and less than kind." (Note: Hamlet 1.2.63–65.)

An unusual rhetorical device, hendiadys, appears in several places in the play. Examples are found in Ophelia's speech at the end of the nunnery scene: "Th'expectancy and rose of the fair state" (Note: Hamlet 3.1.151.) and "And I, of ladies most deject and wretched". (Note: Hamlet 3.1.154.) Many scholars have found it odd that Shakespeare would, seemingly arbitrarily, use this rhetorical form throughout the play. One explanation may be that Hamlet was written later in Shakespeare's life, when he was adept at matching rhetorical devices to characters and the plot. Linguist George T. Wright suggests that hendiadys had been used deliberately to heighten the play's sense of duality and dislocation.

Hamlet's soliloquies have captured the attention of scholars. Hamlet interrupts himself, vocalising either disgust or agreement with himself and embellishing his own words. He has difficulty expressing himself directly and instead blunts the thrust of his thought with wordplay. It is not until late in the play, after his experience with the pirates, that Hamlet is able to articulate his feelings freely.

== Context and interpretation ==
=== Religious ===
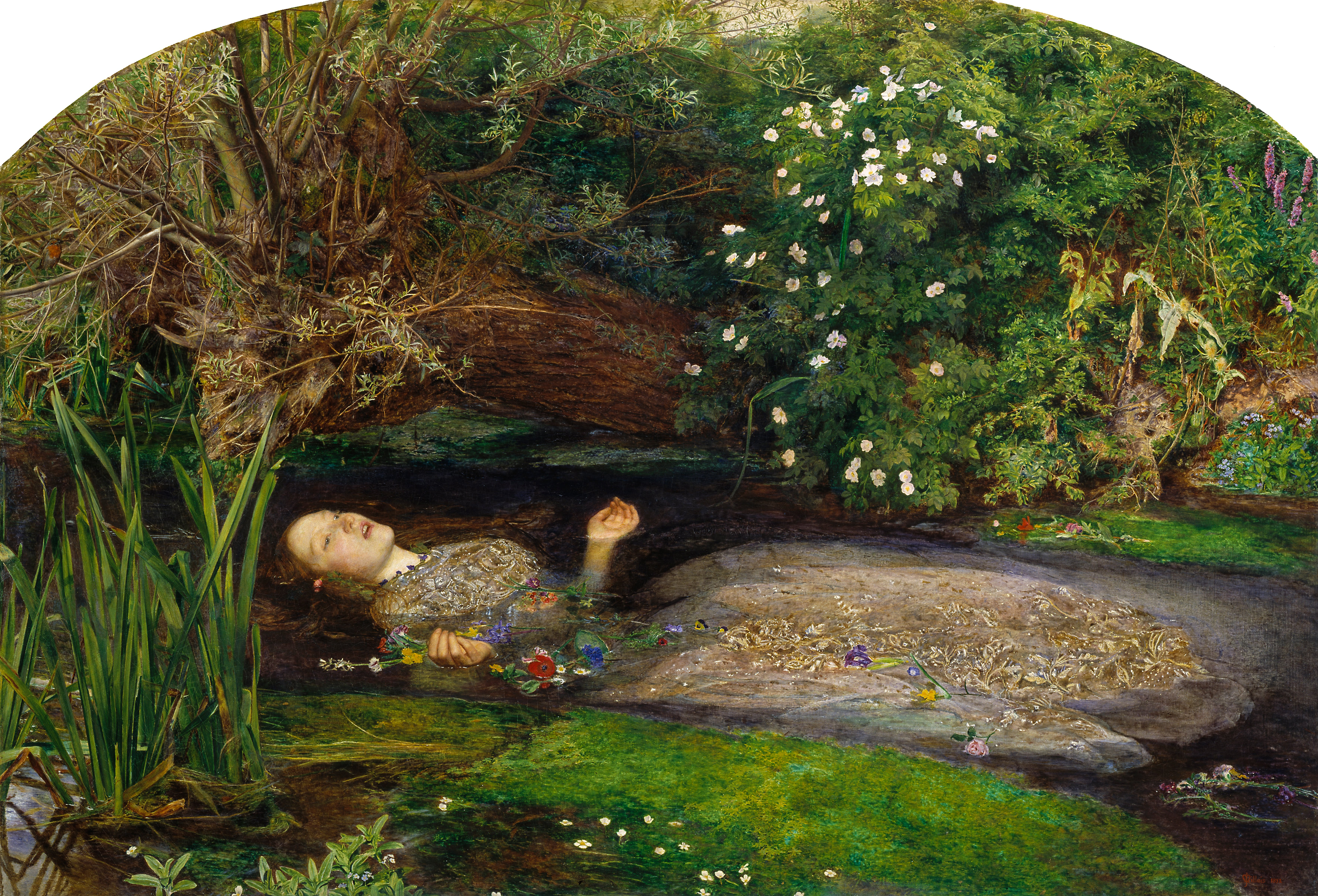
John Everett Millais's Ophelia (1852) depicts Lady Ophelia's mysterious death by drowning. In the play, the gravediggers discuss whether Ophelia's death was a suicide and whether she merits a Christian burial.

Written at a time of religious upheaval and in the wake of the English Reformation, the play is alternately Catholic (or piously medieval) and Protestant (or consciously modern). The ghost describes himself as being in purgatory and as dying without last rites. This and Ophelia's burial ceremony, which is characteristically Catholic, make up most of the play's Catholic connections. Some scholars have observed that revenge tragedies come from Catholic countries such as Italy and Spain, where the revenge tragedies present contradictions of motives, since according to Catholic doctrine the duty to God and family precedes civil justice.

Much of the play's Protestant tones derive from its setting in Denmark—both then and now a predominantly Protestant country, (Note: See the articles on the Reformation in Denmark–Norway and Holstein and Church of Denmark for details.) though it is unclear whether the fictional Denmark of the play is intended to portray this implicit fact. Dialogue refers explicitly to the German city of Wittenberg where Hamlet, Horatio, and Rosencrantz and Guildenstern attend university, implying where the Protestant reformer Martin Luther nailed the Ninety-five Theses to the church door in 1517.

=== Philosophical ===
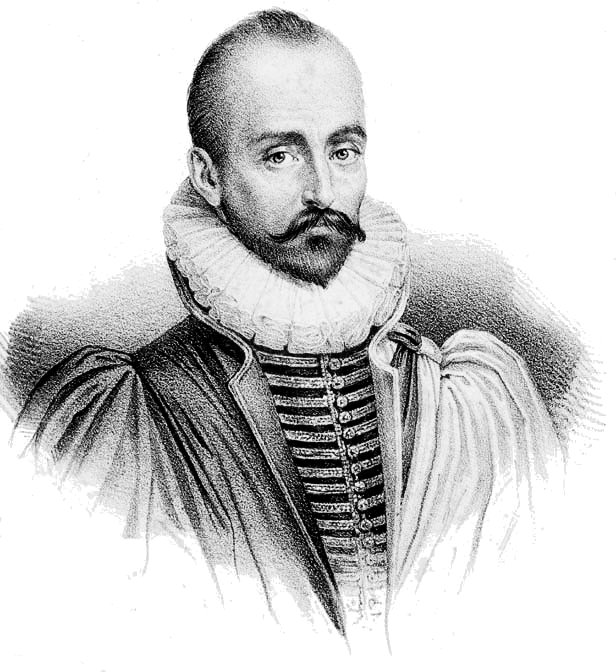
Philosophical ideas in Hamlet are similar to those of the French writer Michel de Montaigne, a contemporary of Shakespeare's (artist: Thomas de Leu, fl. 1560–1612).

Hamlet is often perceived as a philosophical character, expounding ideas that are now described as relativist, existentialist, and sceptical. For example, he expresses a subjectivistic idea when he says to Rosencrantz: "there is nothing either good or bad, but thinking makes it so". (Note: Hamlet 2.2.247–248.) The idea that nothing is real except in the mind of the individual finds its roots in the Greek Sophists, who argued that since nothing can be perceived except through the senses—and since all individuals sense, and therefore perceive things differently—there is no absolute truth, but rather only relative truth. The clearest alleged instance of existentialism is in the "to be, or not to be" (Note: Hamlet 3.1.55–87.) speech.

Hamlet reflects the contemporary scepticism promoted by the French Renaissance humanist Michel de Montaigne. Prior to Montaigne's time, humanists such as Pico della Mirandola had argued that man was God's greatest creation, made in God's image and able to choose his own nature, but this view was subsequently challenged in Montaigne's Essais of 1580. Hamlet's "What a piece of work is a man" seems to echo many of Montaigne's ideas, and many scholars have discussed whether Shakespeare drew directly from Montaigne or whether both men were simply reacting similarly to the spirit of the times.

=== Psychoanalytic ===
"How if Hamlet had in years gone by, as a child, bitterly resented having had to share in his mother's affection even with his own father, had regarded him as a rival, and had secretly wished him out of the way so that he might enjoy undisputed and undisturbed the monopoly of that affection?" When Hamlet's father died, he could not but feel guilty that his wish had been granted, so his grieving was contaminated by guilt and a manufactured idolization of the missing parent.

— Ann Thompson and Neil Taylor, in turn quoting
Ernest Jones' 1949 Hamlet and Oedipus.

Hamlet has featured in some of the key texts of psychoanalysis, and the characters of Hamlet and Ophelia have become iconic representations of, respectively, male and female instability.

Gaston Bachelard's concept of the Ophelia complex related to the symbolic connections between women, water and death, which particularly merge in a representation of a drowning. Elaine Showalter saw Ophelia as a potent archetype of the connection between female insanity and sexuality: that men may go mad for any number of reasons; but that female madness is relentlessly regarded as related to their bodies and sexual desires.

Sigmund Freud developed his ideas about the Oedipus complex, later expostulated in his The Interpretation of Dreams, from analysing Sophocles' Oedipus Rex and Shakespeare's Hamlet. He concluded that "Shakespeare's unconscious understood the unconscious of his hero." (Note: A letter from Sigmund Freud to Wilhelm Fliess in October 1897, cited by Thompson & Taylor) Freud's ideas about Hamlet were later expanded and adapted by Ernest Jones, and directly influenced some twentieth century productions, including Tyrone Guthrie's 1937 Hamlet starring Laurence Olivier.

Jacques Lacan departed from Freud in his Desire and the interpretation of desire in Hamlet, in which he perceived the Ghost as 'the missing signifier, the veiled phallus'. (Note: Marjorie Garber's "Shakespeare's Ghost Writers: Literature as Uncanny Causality" commenting on Jacques Lacan's "Desire and the interpretation of desire in Hamlet": cited in Thompson and Taylor.) And more recently Tom MacFaul's Problem Fathers in Shakespeare and Renaissance Drama explored the possibility that Hamlet's anxiety stems from a fear that Claudius, and not Old Hamlet, was his real father.

=== Feminist ===
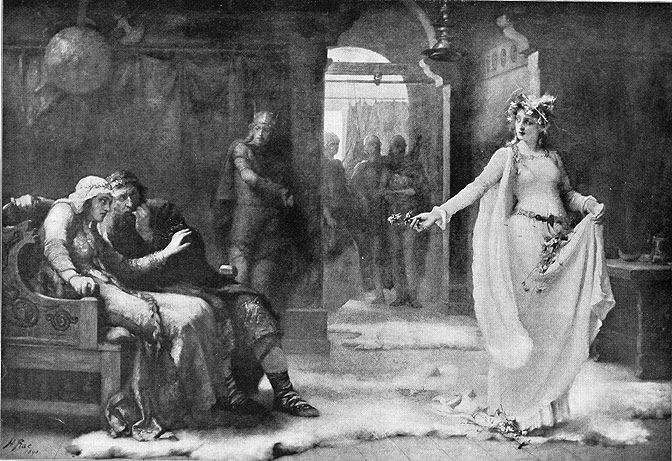
Ophelia is distracted by grief. (Note: Hamlet 4.5.) Feminist critics have explored her descent into madness (artist: Henrietta Rae 1890).

In the 20th century, feminist critics opened up new approaches to Gertrude and Ophelia. New historicist and cultural materialist critics examined the play in its historical context, attempting to piece together its original cultural environment. They focused on the gender system of early modern England, pointing to the common trinity of maid, wife, or widow, with whores outside of that stereotype. In this analysis, the essence of Hamlet is the central character's changed perception of his mother as a whore because of her failure to remain faithful to Old Hamlet. In consequence, Hamlet loses his faith in all women, treating Ophelia as if she too were a whore and dishonest with Hamlet.

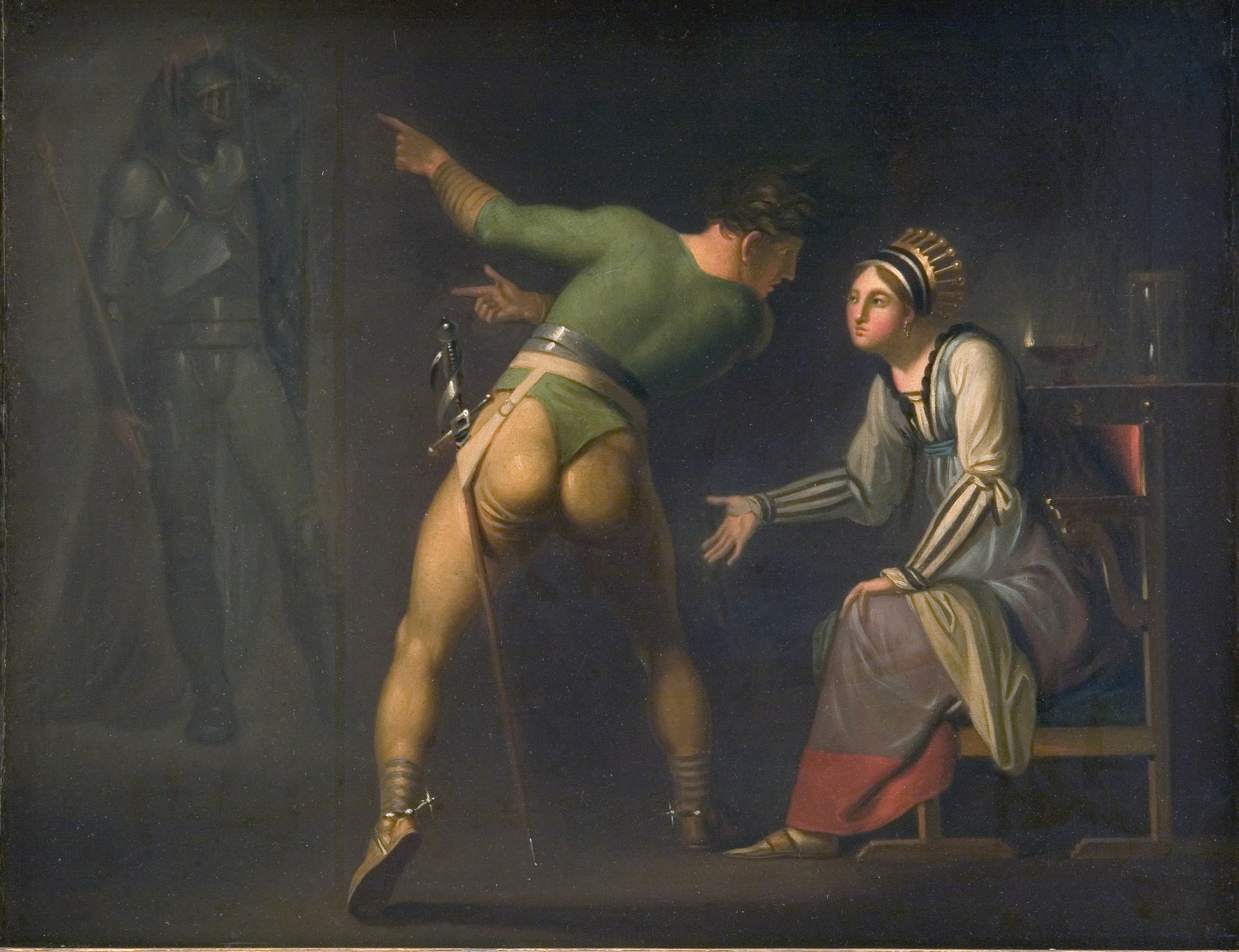
Hamlet tries to show his mother Gertrude his father's ghost (artist: Nicolai A. Abildgaard, c. 1778).

Carolyn Heilbrun's 1957 essay "The Character of Hamlet's Mother" defends Gertrude, arguing that the text never hints that Gertrude knew of Claudius poisoning King Hamlet. This analysis has been praised by many feminist critics, combating what is, by Heilbrun's argument, centuries' worth of misinterpretation. By this account, Gertrude's worst crime is of pragmatically marrying her brother-in-law in order to avoid a power vacuum. This is borne out by the fact that King Hamlet's ghost tells Hamlet to leave Gertrude out of Hamlet's revenge, to leave her to heaven, an arbitrary mercy to grant to a conspirator to murder.

Ophelia has also been defended by feminist critics, most notably Elaine Showalter. Ophelia is surrounded by powerful men: her father, brother, and Hamlet. All three disappear: Laertes leaves, Hamlet abandons her, and Polonius dies. Conventional theories had argued that without these three powerful men making decisions for her, Ophelia is driven into madness. Feminist theorists argue that she goes mad with guilt because, when Hamlet kills her father, he has fulfilled her sexual desire to have Hamlet kill her father so they can be together. Showalter points out that Ophelia has become the symbol of the distraught and hysterical woman in modern culture.

== Influence ==
Hamlet is one of the most quoted works in the English language, and is often included on lists of the world's greatest literature. (Note: Hamlet has 208 quotations in The Oxford Dictionary of Quotations; it takes up 10 of 85 pages dedicated to Shakespeare in the 1986 Bartlett's Familiar Quotations (14th ed. 1968). For examples of lists of the greatest books, see Harvard Classics, Great Books, Great Books of the Western World, Harold Bloom's The Western Canon, St. John's College "Great Books" reading list, and Columbia College Core Curriculum.) As such, it reverberates through the writing of later centuries. Academic Laurie Osborne identifies the direct influence of Hamlet in numerous modern narratives, and divides them into four main categories: fictional accounts of the play's composition, simplifications of the story for young readers, stories expanding the role of one or more characters, and narratives featuring performances of the play.

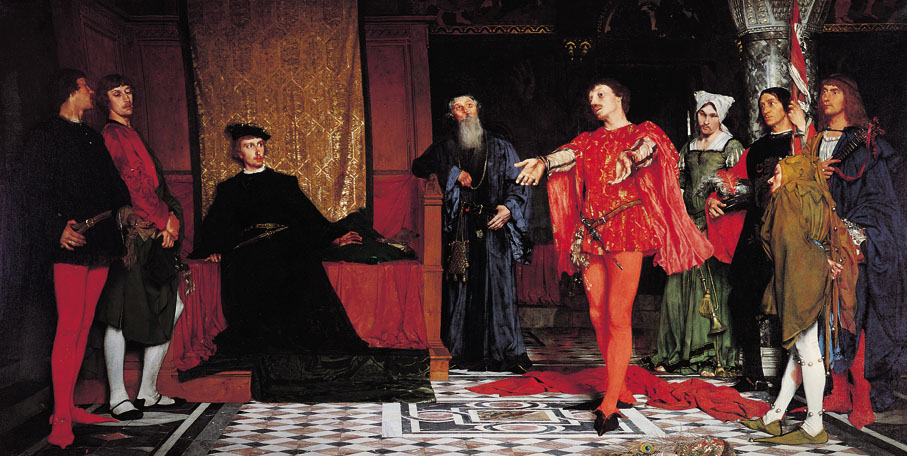
Actors before Hamlet by Władysław Czachórski (1875), National Museum in Warsaw

English poet John Milton was an early admirer of Shakespeare and took evident inspiration from his work. As John Kerrigan discusses, Milton originally considered writing his epic poem Paradise Lost (1667) as a tragedy. While Milton did not ultimately go that route, the poem still shows distinct echoes of Shakespearean revenge tragedy, and of Hamlet in particular. As scholar Christopher N. Warren argues, Paradise Lost's Satan "undergoes a transformation in the poem from a Hamlet-like avenger into a Claudius-like usurper," a plot device that supports Milton's larger Republican internationalist project. The poem also reworks theatrical language from Hamlet, especially around the idea of "putting on" certain dispositions, as when Hamlet puts on "an antic disposition," similarly to the Son in Paradise Lost who "can put on / [God's] terrors."

Henry Fielding's Tom Jones, published about 1749, describes a visit to Hamlet by Tom Jones and Mr Partridge, with similarities to the "play within a play". In contrast, Goethe's Bildungsroman Wilhelm Meister's Apprenticeship, written between 1776 and 1796, not only has a production of Hamlet at its core but also creates parallels between the ghost and Wilhelm Meister's dead father. In the early 1850s, in Pierre, Herman Melville focuses on a Hamlet-like character's long development as a writer. Ten years later, Dickens's Great Expectations contains many Hamlet-like plot elements: it is driven by revenge-motivated actions, contains ghost-like characters (Abel Magwitch and Miss Havisham), and focuses on the hero's guilt. Academic Alexander Welsh notes that Great Expectations is an "autobiographical novel" and "anticipates psychoanalytic readings of Hamlet itself". About the same time, George Eliot's The Mill on the Floss was published, introducing Maggie Tulliver "who is explicitly compared with Hamlet" though "with a reputation for sanity".

In the 1920s, James Joyce managed "a more upbeat version" of Hamlet—stripped of obsession and revenge—in Ulysses, though its main parallels are with Homer's Odyssey. In the 1990s, two novelists were explicitly influenced by Hamlet. In Angela Carter's Wise Children, To be or not to be is reworked as a song and dance routine, and Iris Murdoch's The Black Prince has Oedipal themes and murder intertwined with a love affair between a Hamlet-obsessed writer, Bradley Pearson, and the daughter of his rival. In the late 20th century, David Foster Wallace's novel Infinite Jest draws from Hamlet and takes its title from the play's text.

There is the story of the woman who read Hamlet for the first time and said, "I don't see why people admire that play so. It is nothing but a bunch of quotations strung together."

— Isaac Asimov, Asimov's Guide to Shakespeare, 1970

== Performance history ==
The day we see Hamlet die in the theatre, something of him dies for us. He is dethroned by the spectre of an actor, and we shall never be able to keep the usurper out of our dreams.

— Maurice Maeterlinck in La Jeune Belgique (1890).

=== Shakespeare's day to the Interregnum ===
Shakespeare almost certainly wrote the role of Hamlet for Richard Burbage. He was the chief tragedian of the Lord Chamberlain's Men, with a capacious memory for lines and a wide emotional range. (Note: Hattaway asserts that "Richard Burbage ... played Hieronimo and also Richard III but then was the first Hamlet, Lear, and Othello" and Thomson argues that the identity of Hamlet as Burbage is built into the dramaturgy of several moments of the play: "we will profoundly misjudge the position if we do not recognise that, whilst this is Hamlet talking about the groundlings, it is also Burbage talking to the groundlings". See also Thomson on the first player's beard.) Judging by the number of reprints, Hamlet appears to have been Shakespeare's fourth most popular play during his lifetime—only Henry IV Part 1, Richard III and Pericles eclipsed it. Shakespeare provides no clear indication of when his play is set; however, as Elizabethan actors performed at the Globe in contemporary dress on minimal sets, this would not have affected the staging.

Firm evidence for specific early performances of the play is scant. It is sometimes argued that the crew of the ship Red Dragon, anchored off Sierra Leone, performed Hamlet in September 1607; however, this claim is based on a 19th-century insert of a 'lost' passage into a period document, and is today widely regarded as a hoax, likely to have been perpetrated by John Payne Collier. More credible is that the play toured in Germany within five years of Shakespeare's death, and that it was performed before James I in 1619 and Charles I in 1637. Oxford editor George Hibbard argues that, since the contemporary literature contains many allusions and references to Hamlet (only Falstaff is mentioned more, from Shakespeare), the play was surely performed with a frequency that the historical record misses.

All theatres were closed down by the Puritan government during the Interregnum. Even during this time, however, playlets known as drolls were often performed illegally, including one called The Grave-Makers based on act 5, scene 1 of Hamlet.

=== Restoration and 18th century ===
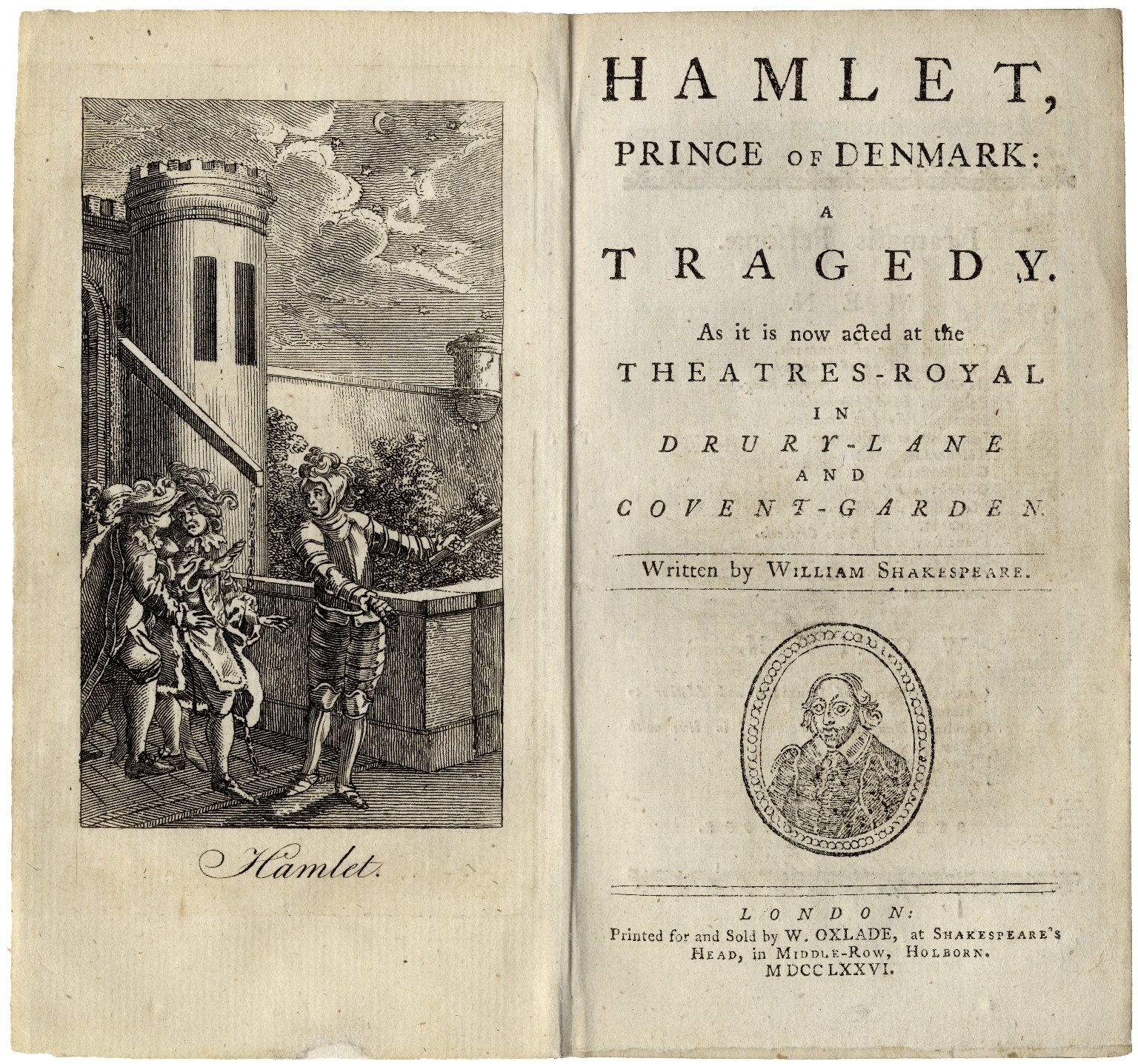
Title page and frontispiece for Hamlet, Prince of Denmark: A Tragedy. As it is now acted at the Theatres-Royal in Drury-Lane and Covent-Garden. London, 1776

The play was revived early in the Restoration. When the existing stock of pre-civil war plays was divided between the two newly created patent theatre companies, Hamlet was the only Shakespearean favourite that Sir William Davenant's Duke's Company secured. It became the first of Shakespeare's plays to be presented with movable flats painted with generic scenery behind the proscenium arch of Lincoln's Inn Fields Theatre. (Note: Samuel Pepys records his delight at the novelty of Hamlet "done with scenes".) This new stage convention highlighted the frequency with which Shakespeare shifts dramatic location, encouraging the recurrent criticism of his failure to maintain unity of place. In the title role, Davenant cast Thomas Betterton, who continued to play the Dane until he was 74. David Garrick at Drury Lane produced a version that adapted Shakespeare heavily; he declared: "I had sworn I would not leave the stage till I had rescued that noble play from all the rubbish of the fifth act. I have brought it forth without the grave-digger's trick, Osrick, & the fencing match". (Note: Letter to Sir William Young, 10 January 1773, quoted by Uglow.) The first actor known to have played Hamlet in North America is Lewis Hallam Jr., in the American Company's production in Philadelphia in 1759.

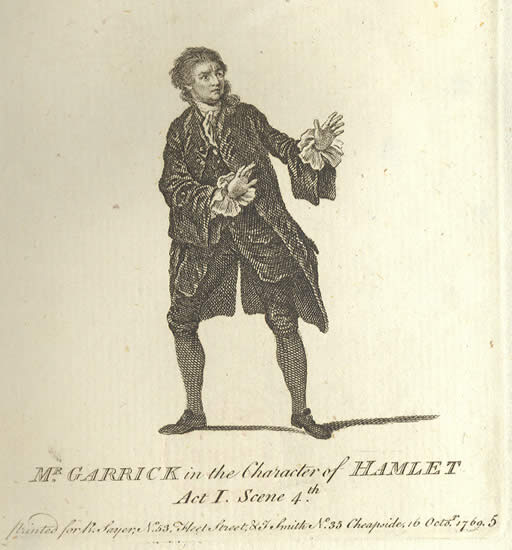
David Garrick expresses Hamlet's shock at his first sighting of the ghost (artist: unknown).

John Philip Kemble made his Drury Lane debut as Hamlet in 1783. His performance was said to be 20 minutes longer than anyone else's, and his lengthy pauses provoked the suggestion by Richard Brinsley Sheridan that "music should be played between the words". Sarah Siddons was the first actress known to play Hamlet; many women have since played him as a breeches role, to great acclaim. In 1748, Alexander Sumarokov wrote a Russian adaptation that focused on Prince Hamlet as the embodiment of an opposition to Claudius's tyranny—a treatment that would recur in Eastern European versions into the 20th century. In the years following America's independence, Thomas Abthorpe Cooper, the young nation's leading tragedian, performed Hamlet among other plays at the Chestnut Street Theatre in Philadelphia, and at the Park Theatre in New York. Although chided for "acknowledging acquaintances in the audience" and "inadequate memorisation of his lines", he became a national celebrity.

=== 19th century ===
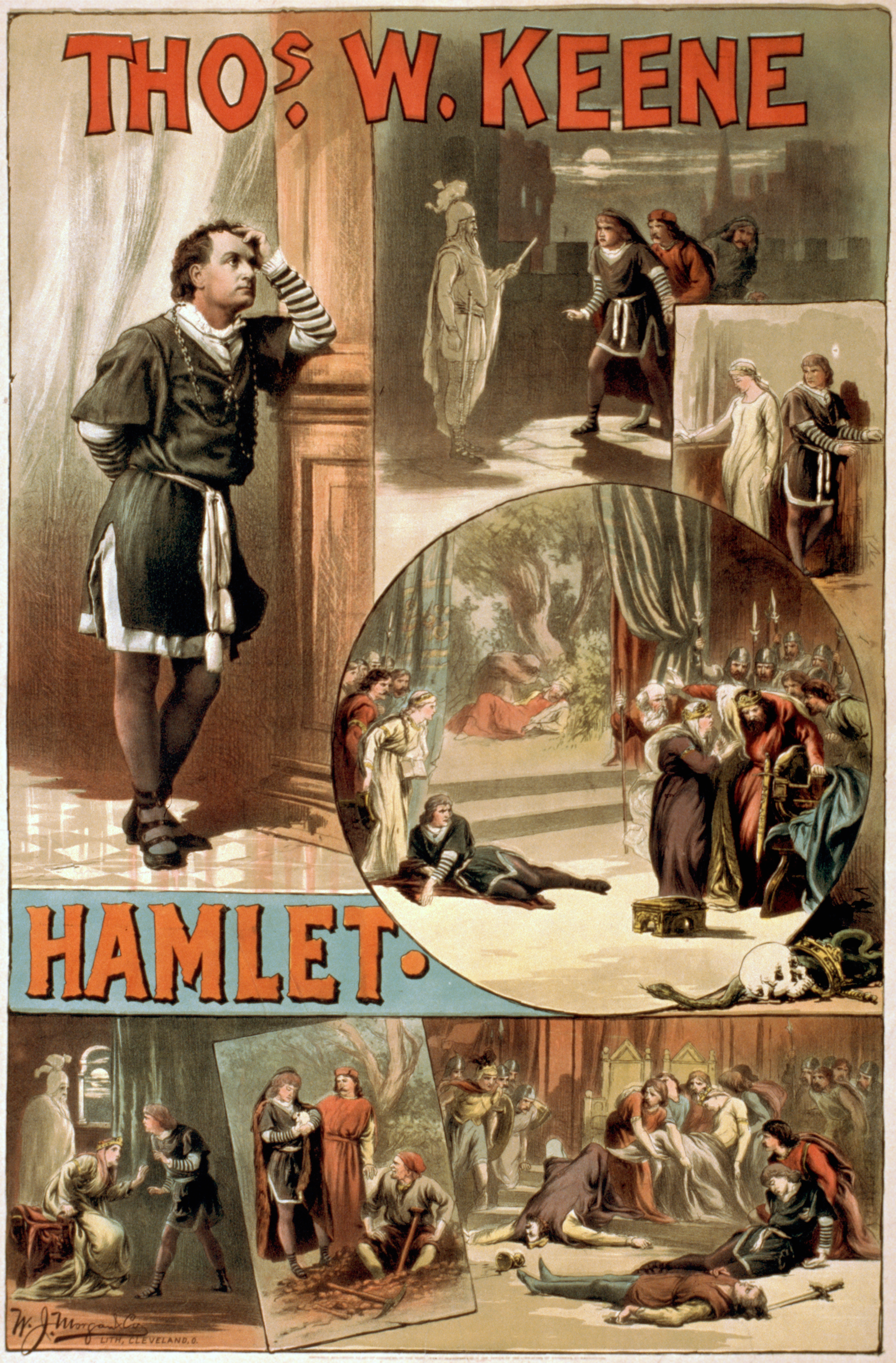
A poster, c. 1884, for an American production of Hamlet (starring Thomas W. Keene), showing several of the key scenes

From around 1810 to 1840, the best-known Shakespearean performances in the United States were tours by leading London actors—including George Frederick Cooke, Junius Brutus Booth, Edmund Kean, William Charles Macready, and Charles Kemble. Of these, Booth remained to make his career in the States, fathering the nation's most notorious actor, John Wilkes Booth (who later assassinated Abraham Lincoln), and its most famous Hamlet, Edwin Booth. Edwin Booth's Hamlet at the Fifth Avenue Theatre in 1875 was described as "... the dark, sad, dreamy, mysterious hero of a poem. [... acted] in an ideal manner, as far removed as possible from the plane of actual life". Booth played Hamlet for 100 nights in the 1864/5 season at the Winter Garden Theatre, inaugurating the era of long-run Shakespeare in America.

In the United Kingdom, the actor-managers of the Victorian era (including Kean, Samuel Phelps, Macready, and Henry Irving) staged Shakespeare in a grand manner, with elaborate scenery and costumes. The tendency of actor-managers to emphasise the importance of their own central character did not always meet with the critics' approval. George Bernard Shaw's praise for Johnston Forbes-Robertson's performance contains a sideswipe at Irving: "The story of the play was perfectly intelligible, and quite took the attention of the audience off the principal actor at moments. What is the Lyceum coming to?" (Note: George Bernard Shaw in The Saturday Review on 2 October 1897.)

In London, Edmund Kean was the first Hamlet to abandon the regal finery usually associated with the role in favour of a plain costume, and he is said to have surprised his audience by playing Hamlet as serious and introspective. In stark contrast to earlier opulence, William Poel's 1881 production of the Q1 text was an early attempt at reconstructing the Elizabethan theatre's austerity; his only backdrop was a set of red curtains. Sarah Bernhardt played the prince in her popular 1899 London production. In contrast to the "effeminate" view of the central character that usually accompanied a female casting, she described her character as "manly and resolute, but nonetheless thoughtful ... [he] thinks before he acts, a trait indicative of great strength and great spiritual power". (Note: Sarah Bernhardt, in a letter to the London Daily Telegraph.)

In France, Charles Kemble initiated an enthusiasm for Shakespeare; and leading members of the Romantic movement such as Victor Hugo and Alexandre Dumas saw his 1827 Paris performance of Hamlet, particularly admiring the madness of Harriet Smithson's Ophelia. In Germany, Hamlet had become so assimilated by the mid-19th century that Ferdinand Freiligrath declared that "Germany is Hamlet". From the 1850s, the Parsi theatre tradition in India transformed Hamlet into folk performances, with dozens of songs added.

=== 20th century ===
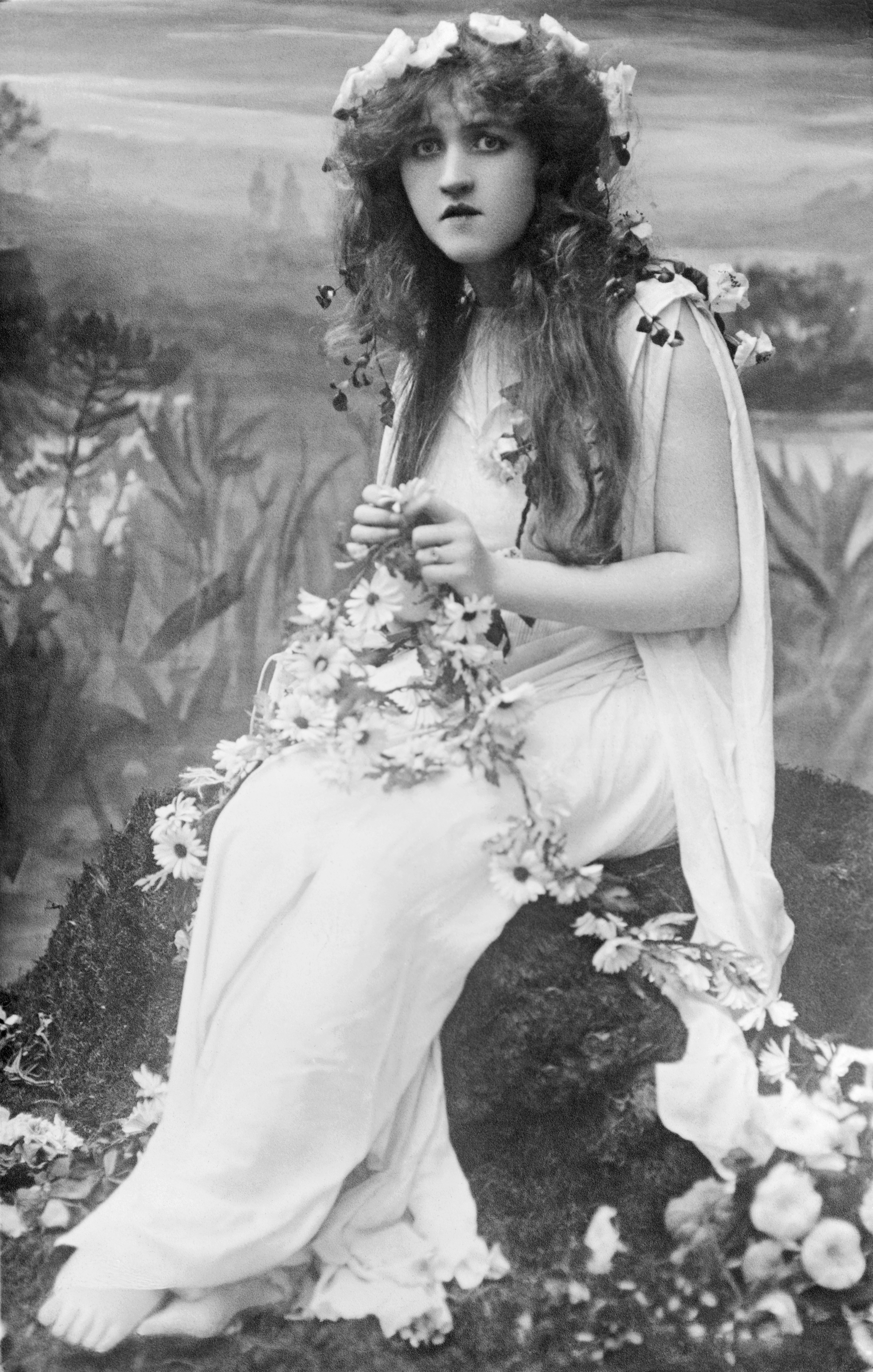
Mignon Nevada as Ophelia, 1910

Konstantin Stanislavski and Edward Gordon Craig collaborated on the Moscow Art Theatre's production of 1911–12. While Craig favoured stylised abstraction, Stanislavski, armed with his 'system,' explored psychological motivation. The most famous aspect of the production was Craig's use of large, abstract screens that altered the size and shape of the acting area for each scene, representing the character's state of mind spatially or visualising a dramaturgical progression. The production attracted enthusiastic worldwide attention for the MAT and placed it "on the cultural map for Western Europe". The first modern dress stagings of Hamlet occurred in 1925 in London and then New York. Of Barry Jackson's Birmingham Repertory Theatre production, Ivor Brown reported "Many of the first night audience came to scoff and remained to hold its breath, to marvel and enjoy... Shakespeare's victory over time and tailoring was swift and sweeping."

Hamlet is often played with contemporary political overtones. Leopold Jessner's 1926 production at the Berlin Staatstheater portrayed Claudius's court as a parody of the corrupt and fawning court of Kaiser Wilhelm. In Poland, the number of productions of Hamlet has tended to increase at times of political unrest, since its political themes (suspected crimes, coups, surveillance) can be used to comment on a contemporary situation. Similarly, Czech directors have used the play at times of occupation: a 1941 Vinohrady Theatre production "emphasised, with due caution, the helpless situation of an intellectual attempting to endure in a ruthless environment". In China, performances of Hamlet often have political significance: in 1942, Jiao Juyin directed the play in a Confucian temple in Sichuan Province, to which the government had retreated from the advancing Japanese. And in the immediate aftermath of the collapse of the protests at Tiananmen Square, Lin Zhaohua staged a 1990 Hamlet in which the prince was an ordinary individual tortured by a loss of meaning.

John Gielgud played the central role many times: his 1936 New York production ran for 132 performances, leading to the accolade that he was "the finest interpreter of the role since Barrymore". Maurice Evans was regarded by many as the leading interpreter of Shakespeare in the United States, and in the 1938/39 season he presented Broadway's first uncut Hamlet, running four and a half hours. Evans later performed a highly truncated version of the play known as the "G.I. Hamlet" in South Pacific war zones during World War II, and later on Broadway, which made the prince a more decisive character.

Olivier's 1937 performance at The Old Vic was popular with audiences but not with all critics; James Agate wrote in The Sunday Times, "Mr. Olivier does not speak poetry badly. He does not speak it at all." Olivier also played the role in Elsinore Castle in 1937, and when in 1963 Olivier directed Peter O'Toole in the inaugural performance of the National Theatre critics found resonance between O'Toole's Hamlet and Jimmy Porter in John Osborne's Look Back in Anger.

Other significant British 20th century Hamlets included Alec Guinness, Michael Redgrave, David Warner, Albert Finney, Jonathan Pryce and Ralph Fiennes. In North America, the role was notably played by Stacy Keach, Sam Waterston, William Hurt, Christopher Walken, Diane Venora, and Keanu Reeves.

Richard Burton received his third Tony nomination when he played his second Hamlet, under Gielgud's direction, in a 1964 production that holds the record for the longest run of the play (137 performances) on Broadway. In 1968, Joseph Papp staged at The Public Theater what became known as "Naked" Hamlet because the text was stripped down; Martin Sheen as Hamlet delivered the monologues either in Spanish or with a Spanish accent, as Hamlet's alter-ego, a Puerto Rican janitor named Ramon.

Ian Charleson performed Hamlet in 1989 in Richard Eyre's production at the National Theatre, replacing Daniel Day-Lewis, who had withdrawn from the production. Seriously ill from AIDS at the time, Charleson died eight weeks after his last performance. Ian McKellen said that Charleson played Hamlet so well it was as if he had rehearsed the role all his life, deeming it "the perfect Hamlet".

=== 21st century ===
Hamlet remains one of the most frequently staged of all plays. The Internet Broadway Database lists a total of 66 productions, and Theatricalia lists 324 in England. Actors performing the lead role since 2000 have included Mark Rylance, Simon Russell Beale, Adrian Lester, Samuel West, Christopher Eccleston, David Tennant, Jude Law, Rory Kinnear, Michael Sheen, Maxine Peake, Benedict Cumberbatch and Andrew Scott. Some of these have played-up the heroic aspects of Hamlet's character: Mark Rylance, in the words of Michael Dobson, "over-acted his madness with a wild frivolity, his laughter constantly bordering on hysterical despair" (Note: Michael Dobson's "Shakespeare Performances in England, 2000" in Shakespeare Survey 54 cited by Thompson & Taylor.) but his working of the groundlings (Note: "Groundlings" is the term used by Hamlet to describe the lower-paying spectators who stood in the yard of the theatre. Rylance's performance was at Shakespeare's Globe, which, being a reconstruction of an early modern theatre, also has groundlings.) kept the audience on Hamlet's side throughout.

The success of Simon Russell Beale's Hamlet was ascribed, by fellow cast member Dennis Quilley, to Beale's insistence on ignoring the tradition that came before him, quoting him as saying "Let's forget Guilgud and Olivier and John Neville, and just see what the character means". Setting Hamlet in a surveillance state has become a common trope of 21st century performances, but has been criticised as simply revisiting courageous 20th century performances made in dangerous surveillance states. (Note: For example Peter Smith in the Times Educational Supplement on 16 December 2010, speaking of Nicholas Hynter, questioned "the entitlement of a contemporary English director to appropriate and condemn the history of another time and place" cited by Thompson and Taylor, 2016.) Going further in this direction, directors including Ian Rickson and Janet Suzman have used a prison setting in their productions. Rickson's version, featuring Michael Sheen as Hamlet, set the play in the prison's secure psychiatric wing, prompting spectators to speculate who was a patient, a doctor or a visitor.

Benedict Cumberbatch's 2015 run at the Barbican Theatre was called the "most in-demand theatre production of all time" and sold out seven hours after tickets went on sale, more than a year before the play opened. And from 2014 to 2016 a touring company from Shakespeare's Globe, featuring Ladi Emeruwa and Naeem Hayat alternating as the prince, engaged in what its director Dominic Dromgoole described as a "brain-defying, logistics-confounding" (Note: Dominic Dromgoole's programme notes to "Globe to Globe Hamlet" (unpaginated), cited by Thompson and Taylor, 2016.) tour of 205 countries known as the "Globe to Globe Hamlet". (Note: See also Globe to Globe Festival.)

=== Film and TV performances ===
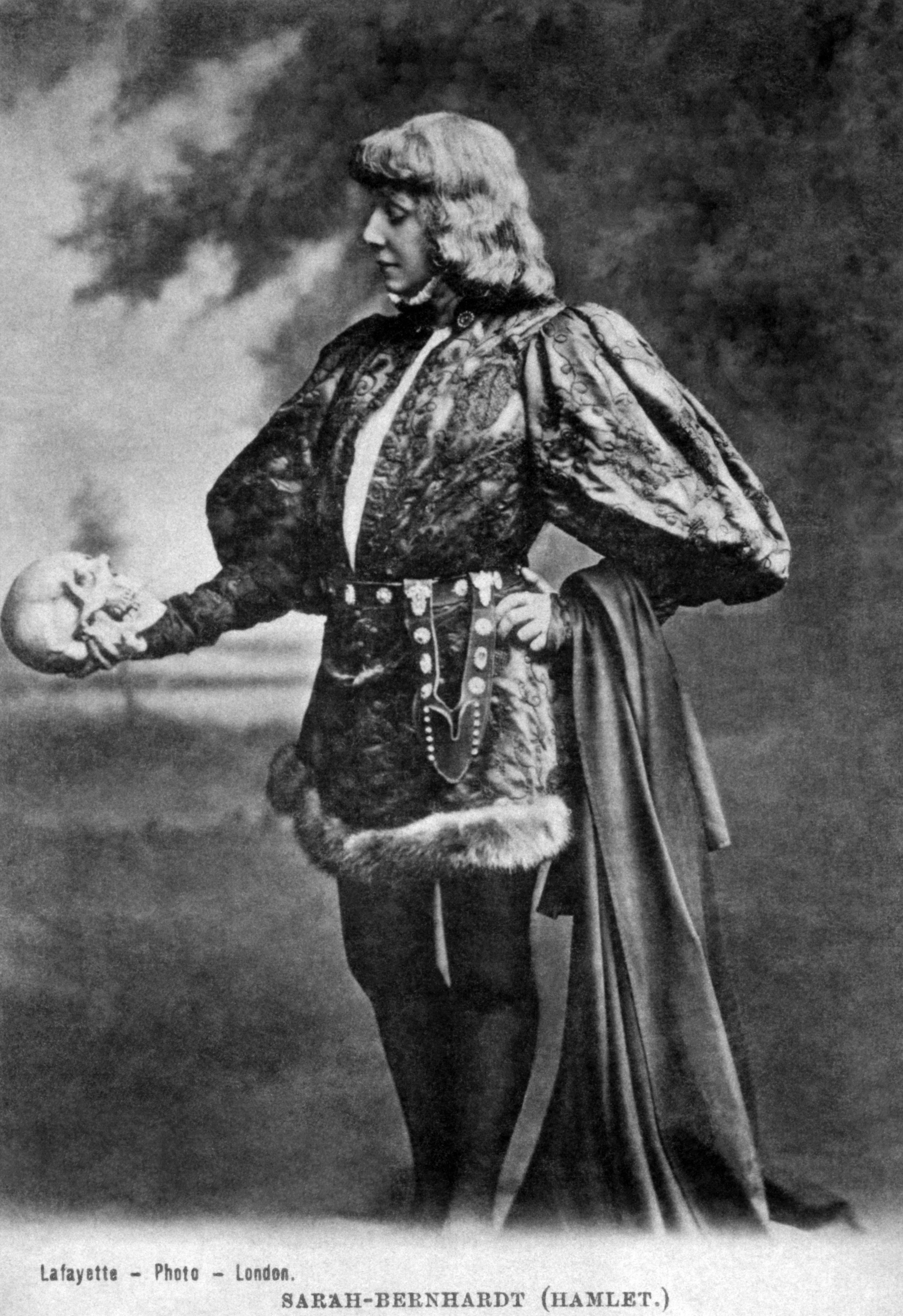
Sarah Bernhardt as Hamlet, with Yorick's skull (photographer: James Lafayette, c. 1885–1900)

An early filmed sequence from Hamlet was Sarah Bernhardt's 1900 five-minute film of the fencing scene (Note: Hamlet 5.2.203–387.). The film was an early attempt at combining sound and film; music and words were recorded on phonograph records, to be played along with the film. Silent versions were released in 1907, 1908, 1910, 1913, 1917, and 1920. In the 1921 film Hamlet, Danish actress Asta Nielsen played the role of Hamlet as a woman who spends her life disguised as a man.

Laurence Olivier's 1948 moody black-and-white Hamlet won Best Picture and Best Actor Academy Awards and as of 2026 is the only Shakespeare film to have done so. His interpretation stressed the Oedipal overtones of the play and cast 28-year-old Eileen Herlie as Hamlet's mother opposite himself at 41 as Hamlet. The 1964 Soviet film Hamlet (Russian: Гамлет) is based on a translation by Boris Pasternak and directed by Grigori Kozintsev, with a score by Dmitri Shostakovich. Innokenty Smoktunovsky was cast in the title role.

John Gielgud directed Richard Burton in a Broadway production in 1964–65, the longest-running Hamlet in the U.S. to date. A live film of the production was produced using "Electronovision", a method of recording a live performance with multiple video cameras and converting the image to film. Eileen Herlie repeated her role from Olivier's film version as the Queen, and the voice of Gielgud was heard as the ghost.

Franco Zeffirelli, whose Shakespeare films have been described as "sensual rather than cerebral", cast Mel Gibson in the title role of his 1990 movie, with Glenn Close as Gertrude.

Kenneth Branagh adapted, directed, and starred in a 1996 version. Branagh's Hamlet was the first unabridged (Note: Branagh's screenplay was a conflation of the full texts of the first folio and the second quarto. See texts above.) theatrical film adaptation of the play and has a runtime of 242 minutes. Branagh set the film with late 19th-century costuming and furnishings, a production in many ways reminiscent of a Russian novel of the time, and Blenheim Palace, built in the early 18th century, became Elsinore Castle in the external scenes. The film is structured as an epic and makes frequent use of flashbacks to highlight elements not made explicit in the play: Hamlet's sexual relationship with Kate Winslet's Ophelia, for example, or his childhood affection for Yorick (played by Ken Dodd).

In 2000, Michael Almereyda's Hamlet set the story in contemporary Manhattan, with Ethan Hawke playing Hamlet as a film student. Claudius (played by Kyle MacLachlan) became the CEO of "Denmark Corporation", having taken over the company by killing his brother.

== Derivative works ==
Even a partial catalogue of loose Hamlet adaptations and allusions would fill this chapter.

— Tony Howard

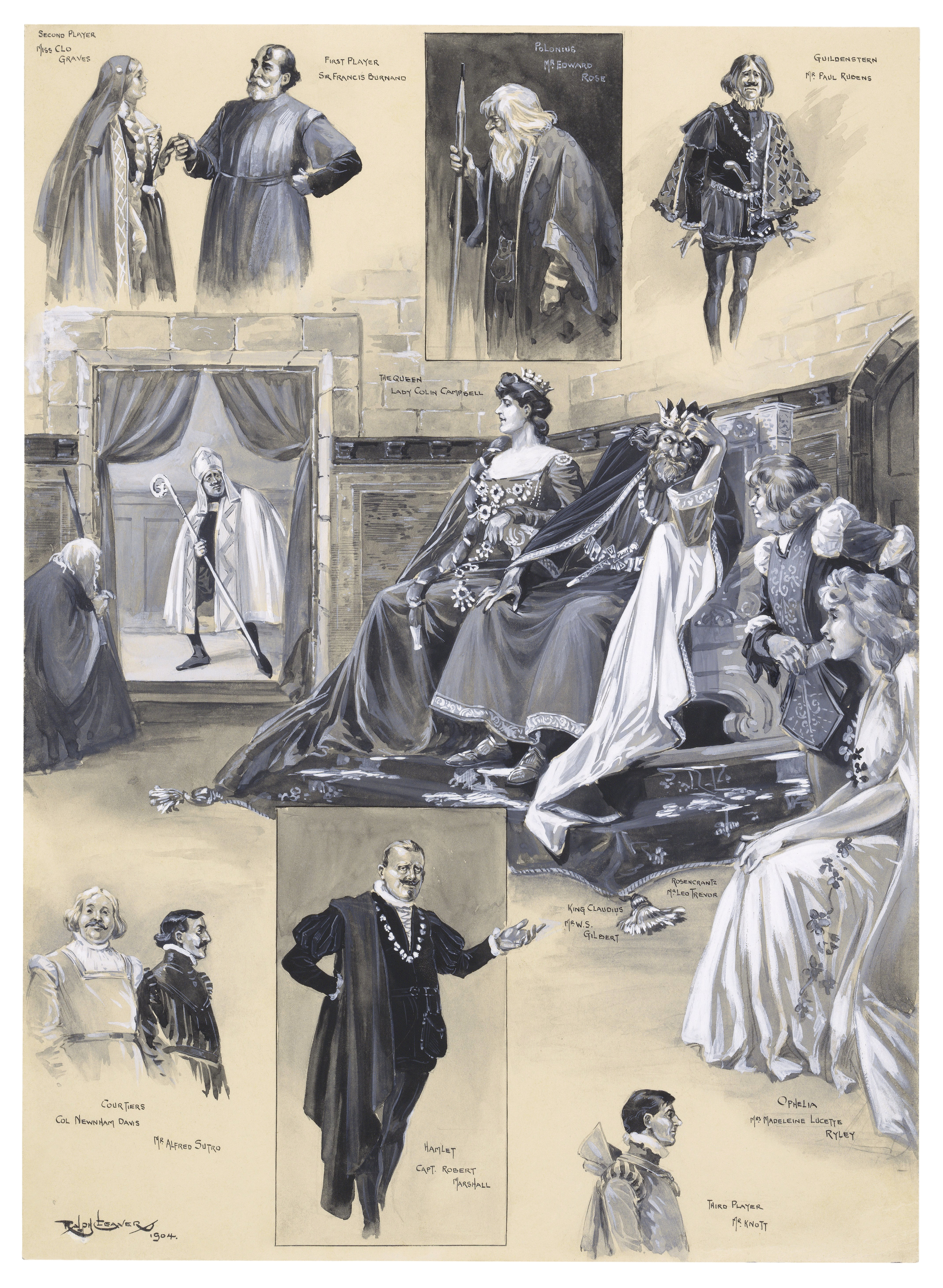
Scenes from a 1904 benefit performance of W. S. Gilbert's Rosencrantz and Guildenstern, with Gilbert as Claudius

On stage, W. S. Gilbert wrote a short comic play titled Rosencrantz and Guildenstern, in which Hamlet's play is presented as a tragedy written by Claudius in his youth of which he is greatly embarrassed. In China, Gu Wuwei's 1916 The Usurper of State Power, an amalgam of Hamlet and Macbeth, was an attack on Yuan Shikai's attempt to overthrow the republic. Tom Stoppard's 1966 play Rosencrantz and Guildenstern Are Dead retells many of the events of the story from the point of view of the characters Rosencrantz and Guildenstern.

In opera, Hamlet has been adapted multiple times, including Ambroise Thomas's 1868 opera Hamlet which amended the story significantly in order to foreground Ophelia's madness and death.

In classical music, the work Hamlet is an 1858 symphonic poem by Franz Liszt influenced by a powerful Weimar performance of the central role by Bogumil Dawison which was said to contrast sharply with the "passive, dreamer" Hamlets of his time. Johannes Brahms set to music Schlegel and Tieck's German translations of five songs from Hamlet in 1873. Edward German's 1897 symphonic poem Hamlet evoked certain themes and essences of the play but made no attempt to follow its plotline. In jazz, the play is referenced in "Madness in Great Ones" from Such Sweet Thunder by Duke Ellington and in "Alas Sweet Lady" by Stan Tracey from Will Power. (Note: The album's full title is Will Power - A Shakespeare Birthday Celebration In Music (1975) by Neil Ardley, Ian Carr, Mike Gibbs and Stan Tracey.)

On screen, Disney's 1994 animated musical film The Lion King is an adaptation of the main plot of Hamlet. Two Hamlet-inspired Chinese films appeared in 2006, The Banquet directed by Feng Xiaogang and Prince of the Himalayas directed by Sherwood Hu. Both built upon the tone, and international popularity, of Crouching Tiger, Hidden Dragon, setting their action in a world of eastern chivalry, carefully avoiding any current political overtones. Andrew Fleming's 2008 comedy Hamlet 2 starred Steve Coogan as a teacher attempting to mount a time-travel based sequel to Hamlet. Vishal Bhardwaj's 2014 Haider was the third in his trilogy of Shakespearean tragedy-influenced Bollywood movies, preceded by Maqbool and Omkara, and which adapted the Hamlet story to modern Kashmir.

== See also ==
- List of idioms attributed to Shakespeare

== Notes and references ==
=== References ===
All references to Hamlet, unless otherwise specified, are taken from the Arden Shakespeare Q2. Under their referencing system, 3.1.55 means act 3, scene 1, line 55. References to the First Quarto and First Folio are marked Hamlet Q1 and Hamlet F1, respectively, and are taken from the Arden Shakespeare Hamlet: the texts of 1603 and 1623. Their referencing system for Q1 has no act breaks, so 7.115 means scene 7, line 115.

== Sources ==
=== Editions of Hamlet ===
- Barnet, Sylvan, ed. (1998). Hamlet. Signet Classics. ISBN 978-0451526922.
- Bate, Jonathan; Rasmussen, Eric, eds. (2007). Complete Works. The RSC Shakespeare. New York: Royal Shakespeare Company. ISBN 978-0-679-64295-4.
- Bate, Jonathan; Rasmussen, Eric, eds. (2008). Hamlet. The RSC Shakespeare. The Royal Shakespeare Company. ISBN 978-0-230-21786-7.
- Edwards, Phillip, ed. (1985). Hamlet, Prince of Denmark. New Cambridge Shakespeare. Cambridge: Cambridge University Press. ISBN 978-0-521-29366-2.
- Evans, G. Blakemore, ed. (1974). The Riverside Shakespeare. The Riverside Shakespeare. Houghton Mifflin for Riverside Shakespeare Company. ISBN 978-0-395-04402-5.
- Hibbard, G. R., ed. (1987). Hamlet. Oxford World's Classics. Oxford: Oxford University Press. ISBN 0-19-283416-9.
- Irace, Kathleen O., ed. (1998). The First Quarto of Hamlet. New Cambridge Shakespeare. Cambridge: Cambridge University Press. ISBN 0-521-65390-8.
- Jenkins, Harold, ed. (1982). Hamlet. Arden Shakespeare, second series. London: Methuen. ISBN 1-903436-67-2.
- Lott, Bernard, ed. (1970). Hamlet. New Swan Shakespeare, Advanced series (New ed.). London: Longman. ISBN 0-582-52742-2.
- Thompson, Ann; Taylor, Neil, eds. (2006). Hamlet. Arden Shakespeare, third series. Vol. 1. London: Cengage Learning. ISBN 1-904271-33-2.
- Thompson, Ann; Taylor, Neil, eds. (2006). Hamlet: The Texts of 1603 and 1623. Arden Shakespeare, third series. Vol. 2. London: Cengage Learning. ISBN 1-904271-80-4.
- Thompson, Ann; Taylor, Neil, eds. (2016). Hamlet - Revised Edition. Arden Shakespeare, third series. Vol. 1. London: Bloomsbury. ISBN 978-1-4725-1838-5.
- Wells, Stanley; Taylor, Gary, eds. (1988). The Complete Works. The Oxford Shakespeare (Compact ed.). Oxford: Clarendon Press. ISBN 0-19-871190-5.
- Weiner, Albert B., ed. (1962). William Shakespeare, Hamlet; The First Quarto 1603. Barrons Educational Series.

=== Secondary sources ===
- Banham, Martin, ed. (1998). The Cambridge Guide to Theatre. Cambridge Guides. Cambridge: Cambridge University Press. ISBN 0-521-43437-8.
- Barratt, Mark (2005). Ian Mckellen: An Unofficial Biography. Virgin Books. ISBN 978-1-85227-251-7.
- Benedetti, Jean (1999) [1988]. Stanislavski: His Life and Art (Revised ed.). London: Methuen. ISBN 0-413-52520-1.
- Billington, Michael (4 May 2001). "Hamlet – Royal Shakespeare Theatre, Stratford Upon Avon". Theatre. The Guardian. London.
- Billington, Michael (6 August 2008). "Hamlet – Courtyard, Stratford-upon-Avon". Theatre. The Guardian. London.
- Bloom, Harold (1994). The Western Canon. New York: Harcourt Brace. ISBN 978-1-57322-514-4.
- Bloom, Harold (2003). Hamlet: Poem Unlimited. Edinburgh: Canongate. ISBN 1-84195-461-6.
- Bloom, Harold; Foster, Brett, eds. (2008). Hamlet. Bloom's Shakespeare through the ages. Bloom's Literary Criticism. ISBN 978-0-7910-9592-8.
- Blum, Daniel C. (1981). A Pictorial History of the American Theatre, 1860–1980 (5th ed.). Crown Publishers. ISBN 978-0-517-54262-0.
- Brandes, Philip (5 July 2001). "A Viking Helmet for Hamlet in Satirical Mad Boy Chronicle". Los Angeles Times.
- Braun, Edward (1982). The Director and the Stage: From Naturalism to Grotowski. London: Methuen. ISBN 978-0-413-46300-5.
- Britton, Celia (1995). "Structuralist and poststructuralist psychoanalytic and Marxist theories". In Seldon, Raman (ed.). From Formalism to Poststructuralism. Cambridge History of Literary Criticism. Vol. 8. Cambridge: Cambridge University Press. ISBN 978-0-521-30013-1.
- Brode, Douglas (2001). Shakespeare in the Movies: From the Silent Era to Today. New York: Berkley Boulevard Books. ISBN 0-425-18176-6.
- "Cook, Eyre, Lee And More Join Jude Law In Grandage's Hamlet". Broadwayworld. 4 February 2009.
- Brown, Mark (1 April 2016). "Sherlock star Andrew Scott to play Hamlet in new UK production". Theatre. The Guardian. London.
- Brown, Mark (11 April 2018). "Shakespeare's Globe casts its own artistic director as Hamlet". Theatre. The Guardian. London.
- Budd, Susan (2005). Rusbridger, Richard (ed.). Introducing Psychoanalysis: Essential Themes and Topics. Routledge. ISBN 978-1-135-44570-6.
- Burian, Jarka (2004) [1993]. "Hamlet in Postwar Czech Theatre". In Kennedy, Dennis (ed.). Foreign Shakespeare: Contemporary Performance (New ed.). Cambridge: Cambridge University Press. ISBN 0-521-61708-1.
- Burnett, Mark Thornton (2003). "'To Hear and See the Matter': Communicating Technology in Michael Almereyda's Hamlet (2000)". Cinema Journal. 42 (3): 48–69. doi:10.1353/cj.2003.0007. ISSN 1527-2087. JSTOR 1225904. S2CID 191444329.
- Burrow, Colin (19 May 2002). "Will the real Hamlet please stand up?". The Times. p. 6 – via InfoTrac Newsstand.
- Calia, Michael (11 August 2014). "Benedict Cumberbatch as 'Hamlet' Opens Next Year, And Is Now Sold Out". Speakeasy. The Wall Street Journal.
- Canby, Vincent (3 May 1995). "Ralph Fiennes as Mod Hamlet". The New York Times.
- Cairncross, Andrew S. (1975) [1936]. The Problem of Hamlet: A Solution (Reprint ed.). Norwood, PA: Norwood Editions. ISBN 0-88305-130-3.
- Cartmell, Deborah. "Franco Zeffirelli and Shakespeare". In Jackson (2000), pp. 212–221.
- Cecil, William (2012) [First published in 1916]. "Ten Precepts". In Craik, Henry (ed.). English Prose, Selections with Critical Introductions by Various Writers and General Introductions to Each Period; edited by Henry Craik (Online edition by Bartleby.com ed.). New York: The Macmillan Company.
- Chambers, E. K. (2009) [First published 1923]. The Elizabethan Stage. Vol. 3. New York: Oxford University Press. ISBN 978-0-19-956750-8.
- Chambers, E. K. (1930). William Shakespeare: A Study of Facts and Problems. Oxford: Clarendon Press.
- Cotsell, Michael (2005). The Theater of Trauma: American modernist drama and the psychological struggle for the American Mind. New York: Peter Lang. ISBN 978-0-8204-7466-3.
- Crowl, Samuel. "Flamboyant Realist: Kenneth Branagh". In Jackson (2000), pp. 222–240.
- Crowl, Samuel (2014). Shakespeare's Hamlet: The Relationship Between Text and Film. Screen Adaptations. Arden Shakespeare. ISBN 978-1-4725-3893-2.
- "Jude Law to play Hamlet at 'home' Kronborg Castle". The Daily Mirror. 10 July 2009.
- Davies, Anthony. "The Shakespeare films of Laurence Olivier". In Jackson (2000), pp. 163–182.
- Davison, Richard Allan (1999). "The Readiness Was All: Ian Charleson and Richard Eyre's Hamlet". In Potter, Lois; Kinney, Arthur F. (eds.). Shakespeare, Text and Theater: Essays in Honor of Jay L. Halio. Newark: University of Delaware Press. ISBN 978-0-87413-699-9.
- Dawson, Anthony B. "International Shakespeare". In Wells & Stanton (2002), pp. 174–193.
- Duncan-Jones, Catherine (2001). Ungentle Shakespeare: scenes from his life. London: Arden Shakespeare. ISBN 1-903436-26-5.
- Fine, Marshall (10 April 2013). "Paul Giamatti in Hamlet". HuffPost.
- Fox, Margalit (18 September 2009). "Jack Manning, Character Actor, Dies at 93". Theater. The New York Times.
- Freud, Sigmond; Bunker, Henry Alden (1960). "Psychopathic Characters on the Stage". The Tulane Drama Review. 4 (3). The MIT Press: 144–148. doi:10.2307/1124852. ISSN 0886-800X. JSTOR 1124852. S2CID 149658226.
- Freud, Sigmund (1991) [1900]. Richards, Angela (ed.). The Interpretation of Dreams. The Penguin Freud Library. Vol. 4. Translated by Strachey, James. London: Penguin. ISBN 0-14-013794-7.
- Freud, Sigmund (1995) [1900]. Brill, A. A. (ed.). The Basic Writings of Sigmund Freud. Translated by Brill, A. A. New York: The Modern Library. ISBN 978-0-679-60166-1.
- Gardner, Lyn (8 November 2002). "Hamlet – West Yorkshire Playhouse, Leeds". Theatre. The Guardian. London.
- Gay, Penny. "Women and Shakespearean Performance". In Wells & Stanton (2002), pp. 155–173.
- Gilbert, W. S. (1892). "Rosencrantz and Guildenstern". Foggerty's Fairy: and other tales. London: George Routledge & Sons.
- Gillies, John; Minami, Ryuta; Li, Ruru; Trivedi, Poonam. "Shakespeare on the Stages of Asia". In Wells & Stanton (2002), pp. 259–283.
- "About the Project". Globe to Globe Hamlet. Shakespeare's Globe. n.d. Archived from the original on 8 July 2016.
- de Grazia, Margreta (2007). Hamlet without Hamlet. Cambridge: Cambridge University Press. ISBN 978-0-521-69036-2.
- Greenblatt, Stephen (2004a). Will in the World: How Shakespeare Became Shakespeare. New York: W. W. Norton & Company. ISBN 0-393-05057-2.
- Greenblatt, Stephen (21 October 2004). "The Death of Hamnet and the Making of Hamlet". The New York Review of Books. Vol. 51, no. 16.
- Grode, Eric (30 March 2011). "Dueling Mentors Bedevil a Dithering Young Dane". Theater Reviews. The New York Times.
- Guernsey, Otis L.; Sweet, Jeffrey, eds. (2000). The Applause/Best Plays Theater Yearbook 1991–1992. Illustrated by Al Hirschfeld (illustrated ed.). Hal Leonard. ISBN 978-1-55783-147-7.
- Guntner, J. Lawrence. "Hamlet, Macbeth and King Lear on film". In Jackson (2000), pp. 117–134.
- Gupta, Priya (7 February 2014). "Bollywood returns to their favourite destination Kashmir". The Times of India.
- Gussow, Mel (3 April 1992). "A High-Keyed Hamlet Starring Stephen Lang". The New York Times.
- Gussow, Mel (14 October 1992). "Theater in Review". Theater. The New York Times.
- Halliday, F. E. (1969) [first ed. 1964]. A Shakespeare Companion 1564–1964. Shakespeare Library. Baltimore: Penguin. ISBN 0-14-053011-8.
- Hattaway, Michael (1982). Elizabethan Popular Theatre: Plays in Performance. Theatre Production. London and Boston: Routledge & Kegan Paul. ISBN 0-7100-9052-8.
- Hattaway, Michael (1987). Hamlet. The Critics Debate. Basingstoke, Hampshire: Macmillan. ISBN 0-333-38524-1.
- Heilbrun, Carolyn (1957). "The Character of Hamlet's Mother". Shakespeare Quarterly. 8 (2): 201–206. doi:10.2307/2866964. eISSN 1538-3555. ISSN 0037-3222. JSTOR 2866964.
- Hirrel, Michael J. (2010). "Duration of Performances and Lengths of Plays: How Shall We Beguile the Lazy Time?". Shakespeare Quarterly. 61 (2). Folger Shakespeare Library: 159–182. doi:10.1353/shq.0.0140. eISSN 1538-3555. ISSN 0037-3222. JSTOR 40731154. S2CID 191661049.
- Holland, Peter. "Touring Shakespeare". In Wells & Stanton (2002), pp. 194–211.
- Holland, Peter (2007). "Shakespeare Abbreviated". In Shaughnessy, Robert (ed.). The Cambridge Companion to Shakespeare and Popular Culture. Cambridge Companions to Literature. Cambridge: Cambridge University Press. ISBN 978-0-521-60580-9.
- Hortmann, Wilhelm. "Shakespeare on the Political Stage in the Twentieth Century". In Wells & Stanton (2002), pp. 212–229.
- Howard, Tony. "Shakespeare's Cinematic Offshoots". In Jackson (2000), pp. 295–313.
- Howard, Jean E. (2003). "Feminist Criticism". In Wells, Stanley; Orlin, Lena (eds.). Shakespeare: An Oxford Guide. Oxford Guides. Oxford: Oxford University Press. ISBN 0-19-924522-3.
- Innes, Christopher (1983). Edward Gordon Craig. Directors in Perspective. Cambridge: Cambridge University Press. ISBN 0-521-27383-8.
- Isherwood, Charles (26 March 1995). "Middle-Aged, Yet a Prince, Slouching but Haunted". The New York Times.
- Itzkoff, Dave (30 June 2009). "Donmar Warehouse's Hamlet Coming to Broadway With Jude Law". ArtsBeat. The New York Times.
- Jackson, MacDonald (1986). "The Transmission of Shakespeare's Text". In Wells, Stanley (ed.). The Cambridge Companion to Shakespeare Studies. Cambridge Companions to Literature. Cambridge: Cambridge University Press. pp. 163–185. ISBN 0-521-31841-6.
- Jackson, Russell, ed. (2000). The Cambridge Companion to Shakespeare on Film. Cambridge Companions to Literature. Cambridge: Cambridge University Press. ISBN 0-521-63975-1.
- Jones, Ernest (1910). "The Œdipus-Complex as an Explanation of Hamlet's Mystery: A Study in Motive". American Journal of Psychology. 21 (1). University of Illinois Press: 72–113. doi:10.2307/1412950. eISSN 1939-8298. ISSN 0002-9556. JSTOR 1412950. S2CID 46623868.
- Kellaway, Kate (25 June 2017). "Hamlet review – an all-consuming marvel – 5 out of 5 stars". The Guardian.
- Kerrigan, John (1996). Revenge Tragedy: Aeschylus to Armageddon. Oxford: Clarendon Press. ISBN 978-0-19-159172-3.
- Keyishian, Harry. "Shakespeare and Movie Genre: The Case of Hamlet". In Jackson (2000), pp. 72–84.
- Kiernan, Pauline (2007). Filthy Shakespeare: Shakespeare's Most Outrageous Sexual Puns (revised ed.). Quercus. ISBN 978-1-84724-073-6.
- Kirsch, Arthur C. (1969). "A Caroline Commentary on the Drama". Modern Philology. 66 (3). The University of Chicago Press: 256–261. doi:10.1086/390087. eISSN 1545-6951. ISSN 0026-8232. JSTOR 436454. S2CID 162049086.
- Kliman, Bernice W. (Summer 2011). "At Sea about Hamlet at Sea: A Detective Story". Shakespeare Quarterly. 62 (2): 180–204. doi:10.1353/shq.2011.0025. ISSN 0037-3222. JSTOR 23025627. S2CID 192187966.
- Knowles, Ronald (1999). "Hamlet and Counter-Humanism". Renaissance Quarterly. 52 (4). Renaissance Society of America: 1046–1069. doi:10.2307/2901835. eISSN 1935-0236. JSTOR 2901835. S2CID 170767175.
- Law, Jude (2 October 2009). "Shakespeare's Hamlet with Jude Law". Charlie Rose (Interview). Interviewed by Charlie Rose. PBS.
- MacCary, W. Thomas (1998). "Hamlet": A Guide to the Play. Greenwood Guides to Shakespeare. Westport, Connecticut: Greenwood Press. ISBN 0-313-30082-8.
- Marsden, Jean I. "Improving Shakespeare: from the Restoration to Garrick". In Wells & Stanton (2002), pp. 21–36.
- McKellen, Ian; Puttnam, David; Wax, Ruby; Redgrave, Vanessa; Bates, Alan (1990). For Ian Charleson: A Tribute. London: Constable and Company. ISBN 978-0-09-470250-9.
- Moody, Jane. "Romantic Shakespeare". In Wells & Stanton (2002), pp. 37–57.
- Morrison, Michael A. "Shakespeare in North America". In Wells & Stanton (2002), pp. 230–258.
- Morrison, Michael A. (1997). John Barrymore, Shakespearean Actor. Cambridge: Cambridge University Press. ISBN 0-521-62028-7.
- "Hamlet 1963". Royal National Theatre. n.d. Archived from the original on 11 August 2010.
- Novy, Marianne L. (1994). Engaging with Shakespeare: Responses of George Eliot and Other Women Novelists. Athens, Georgia: University of Georgia Press. ISBN 978-0-8203-1596-6.
- O'Connor, Marion. "Reconstructive Shakespeare: Reproducing Elizabethan and Jacobean Stages". In Wells & Stanton (2002), pp. 76–97.
- Osborne, Laurie (2007). "Narration and Staging in Hamlet and its afternovels". In Shaughnessy, Robert (ed.). The Cambridge Companion to Shakespeare and Popular Culture. Cambridge Companions to Literature. Cambridge: Cambridge University Press. pp. 114–133. ISBN 978-0-521-60580-9.
- Pitcher, John; Woudhuysen, Henry (1969). Shakespeare Companion, 1564–1964. London: Penguin. ISBN 0-14-053011-8.
- Rosenberg, Marvin (1992). The Masks of Hamlet. London: Associated University Presses. ISBN 0-87413-480-3.
- Rothman, Joshua (14 August 2013). "Hamlet: A Love Story". The New Yorker.
- Rowse, A. L. (1995) [1963]. William Shakespeare: A Biography. New York: Barnes & Noble Books. ISBN 1-56619-804-6.
- Sams, Eric (1995). The Real Shakespeare; Retrieving the Early Years, 1564-1594. Yale University Press. ISBN 978-0300072822.
- Sanders, Julie (2007). Shakespeare and Music: Afterlives and Borrowings. Polity Press. ISBN 978-07456-3297-1.
- Saxo Grammaticus (1983). Hansen, William (ed.). Saxo Grammaticus and the Life of Hamlet: A Translation, History, and Commentary. Lincoln: University of Nebraska Press. ISBN 0-8032-2318-8.
- Schoch, Richard W. "Pictorial Shakespeare". In Wells & Stanton (2002), pp. 58–75.
- Schultz, David G. (16 July 2008). "A Play at Poolside: Caridad Svich's 12 Ophelias". The Brooklyn Rail.
- Shapiro, James (2005). 1599: A Year in the Life of William Shakespeare. London: Faber. ISBN 0-571-21481-9.
- Shaw, George Bernard (1961). Wilson, Edwin (ed.). Shaw on Shakespeare. New York: Applause Theatre & Cinema Books.
- Shenton, Mark (10 September 2007). "Jude Law to star in Donmar's Hamlet". The Stage.
- Showalter, Elaine (1985). "Representing Ophelia: Women, Madness, and the Responsibilities of Feminist Criticism". In Parker, Patricia; Hartman, Geoffrey (eds.). Shakespeare and the Question of Theory. New York and London: Methuen. pp. 77–94. ISBN 0-416-36930-8.
- Small, Alan (19 April 2019). "International Magazine Recalls Reeves' Reign As Hamlet". Winnipeg Free Press.
- Smallwood, Robert. "Twentieth-century Performance: The Stratford and London Companies". In Wells & Stanton (2002), pp. 98–117.
- Spencer, Charles (10 November 2011). "Hamlet, The Young Vic Theatre: review". The Daily Telegraph. Archived from the original on 10 January 2022.
- Starks, Lisa S. (1999). "The Displaced Body of Desire: Sexuality in Kenneth Branagh's Hamlet". In Desmet, Christy; Sawyer, Robert (eds.). Shakespeare and Appropriation. Accents on Shakespeare. London: Routledge. pp. 160–178. ISBN 0-415-20725-8.
- Stewart, Rachel (11 August 2014). "Cumberbatch's Hamlet most in-demand show of all time". The Daily Telegraph. London.
- Sulcas, Roslyn (1 August 2017). "Kenneth Branagh to Direct Tom Hiddleston in Hamlet". Theater. The New York Times.
- Tanitch, Robert (1985). Olivier: The complete career. Abbeville Press. ISBN 978-0-89659-590-3.
- Taxidou, Olga (1998). The Mask: A Periodical Performance by Edward Gordon Craig. Contemporary Theatre Studies. Vol. 30. Amsterdam: Harwood Academic Publishers. ISBN 90-5755-046-6.
- Taylor, Gary (1989). Reinventing Shakespeare: A Cultural History from the Restoration to the Present. London: Hogarth Press. ISBN 0-7012-0888-0.
- Taylor, Gary. "Shakespeare Plays on Renaissance Stages". In Wells & Stanton (2002).
- Thompson, Ann (2001). Alexander, Catherine M.S.; Wells, Stanley (eds.). Shakespeare and Sexuality. Cambridge: Cambridge University Press. pp. 1–13. ISBN 0-521-80475-2.
- Thompson, Ann; Taylor, Neil (1996). William Shakespeare, "Hamlet". Plymouth, UK: Northcote House, in association with the British Council. ISBN 978-0-74630-765-6. OCLC 954440601.
- Thomson, Peter (1983). Shakespeare's Theatre. Theatre Production. London and Boston: Routledge and Kegan Paul. ISBN 0-7100-9480-9.
- Todoroff, Aimee (19 March 2011). "Wittenberg". Nytheatre.com. Archived from the original on 23 October 2017.
- Trilling, Lionel (2009). Sincerity and Authenticity. The Charles Eliot Norton Lectures. Harvard University Press. ISBN 978-0-674-50419-6.
- Uglow, Jenny (2002) [1977]. Hogarth: A Life and a World (New ed.). London: Faber and Faber. ISBN 0-571-19376-5.
- Vickers, Brian, ed. (1995a) [1974]. Shakespeare: The Critical Heritage (1623–1692). Vol. 1 (New ed.). London: Routledge. ISBN 0-415-13404-8.
- Vickers, Brian, ed. (1995b) [1974]. Shakespeare: The Critical Heritage (1753–1765). Vol. 4 (New ed.). London: Routledge. ISBN 0-415-13407-2.
- Vickers, Brian, ed. (1995c) [1974]. Shakespeare: The Critical Heritage (1765–1774). Vol. 5 (New ed.). London: Routledge. ISBN 0-415-13408-0.
- Warren, Christopher N. (2016). "Big Leagues: Specters of Milton and Republican International Justice between Shakespeare and Marx". Humanity. 7 (3). University of Pennsylvania Press: 365–389. doi:10.1353/hum.2016.0020. ISSN 2151-4372. S2CID 159721222.
- Warren, Jim (n.d.). "Every Exit is an Entrance Someplace Else". Director's Notes. American Shakespeare Center. Archived from the original on 22 December 2015.
- Wells, Stanley, ed. (2000). Shakespeare in the Theatre - An Anthology of Criticism. Oxford Shakespeare Topics. Oxford University Press. ISBN 978-0-19-871176-6.
- Wells, Stanley; Stanton, Sarah, eds. (2002). The Cambridge Companion to Shakespeare on Stage. Cambridge Companions to Literature. Cambridge: Cambridge University Press. ISBN 0-521-79711-X.
- Welsh, Alexander (2001). Hamlet in his Modern Guises. Princeton University Press. ISBN 978-0-691-05093-5.
- Wild, Stephi (1 September 2022). "Billy Howle Joined by Niamh Cusack and Mirren Mack in Hamlet at Bristol Old Vic; Full Cast Announced". BroadwayWorld.
- Wilson, J. Dover (1932). The Essential Shakespeare: A Biographical Adventure. Cambridge: Cambridge University Press.
- Winstanley, Lilian (1977) [1921]. Hamlet and the Scottish succession, Being an Examination of the Relations of the Play of Hamlet to the Scottish Succession and the Essex Conspiracy. Philadelphia: R. West. ISBN 0-8492-2912-X.
- Winter, William (26 October 1875). "Fifth Avenue Theater – Edwin Booth as Hamlet". The Drama. New-York Tribune. p. 5. ISSN 1941-0646. LCCN sn83030214. OCLC 9405688.
- Wofford, Susanne L. (1994). "A Critical History of Hamlet". Hamlet: Complete, Authoritative Text with Biographical and Historical Contexts, Critical History, and Essays from Five Contemporary Critical Perspectives. Boston: Bedford Books. pp. 181–207. ISBN 0-312-08986-4.
- Zhuk, Nataliia (2 September 2017). "Tom Hiddleston in Hamlet review: A Supremely Self-Assured Prince – Rada's Jerwood Vanbrugh Theatre". The Telegraph. ISSN 0307-1235.
