= Returning to Shakespeare =

1989 nonfiction book

- Author: Brian Vickers
- Language: English
- Publisher: Routledge
- Publication date: 1989
- Publication place: United Kingdom

Returning to Shakespeare is a non-fiction book written by Brian Vickers the literary scholar, and published by Routledge, London, in 1989. The book's main focus is a collection of previously published critical essays by Vickers pertaining to Shakespeare. The book is also prefaced with an extensive autobiographical sketch that details Vickers' evolution within Shakespearean scholarship.
