= New Swan Theater =

Coordinates: 33.6447°N 117.8428°W

The New Swan Theatre during the 2026 season.

The New Swan Theater is an outdoor, portable theater that is assembled and disassembled each summer as part of the New Swan Shakespeare Festival, an annual Shakespeare festival at the University of California, Irvine. It is a reduced-size replica of Shakespeare's Globe Theatre.

== Construction ==
The New Swan Theater was designed by Luke Cantarella, Drama Professor at UCI, and engineered and assembled by Keith Bangs of UC Irvine's Claire Trevor School of the Arts. It was built out of recycled materials. This circular theater has 15 modular units, each weighing one ton. The wood and steel structure is stored in winter to protect it from the weather, and then moved to the university's Gateway Commons in early June for the festival season.

The New Swan Theater is styled as a mini-Elizabethan theater. It is roof-less, with 132 seats on three levels set in the round. There are five sets of seats: The Kings row - on the stage itself, the Groundlings - also on the stage, The Queens - first row mezzanine, the Lords - second row mezzanine, and The Heavens - up on the balcony. Unlike most theaters, the balcony is directly atop the mezzanine. Every seat is close to the stage.

== Performances ==
The theater was given a test run in February 2012 on the stage of the Claire Trevor Theatre at UCI for performances of Shakespeare's The Merchant of Venice, directed by Eli Simon and featuring Richard Brestoff as Shylock. The New Swan's first outdoor season was held in August 2012 with performances of The Comedy of Errors, directed by Beth Lopes, and The Merchant of Venice, directed by Eli Simon. In 2013 the festival featured King Lear and A Midsummer Night's Dream, with The Fantasticks playing in September. In 2013 the New Swan Shakespeare Festival was presented with an Orange County Arts Achievement Award for Outstanding Contribution to the Built Environment.

The 2014 season featured Twelfth Night and Romeo and Juliet. In 2015 it showed Macbeth and Much Ado About Nothing. The 2016 season featured Hamlet and As You Like It, and the 2017 season featured The Tempest and The Taming of the Shrew. The seventh season in 2018 included performances of A Midsummer Night's Dream and The Winter's Tale. The 2019 season featured The Merchant of Venice and The Two Gentlemen of Verona. The next two live seasons were cancelled due to COVID. At this point in time, The New Swan Shakespeare Center was established. The Center and Festival presented filmed productions during the COVID years: A Midsummer Night's Zoom, Wherein I See Myself, and All the World's a Stage. In 2022, the Festival returned with The Comedy of Errorrrs and Pericles. The 2023 season featured three plays (for the first time) in rotating rep: As You Like It, Julius Caesar, and The Complete Works of William Shakespeare (abridged) (revised) (redone). In 2024, the Festival is staging perennial favourite Twelfth Night alongside Measure for Measure.

| Year | Productions | Notes |
|---|---|---|
| 2012 | The Comedy of Errors, The Merchant of Vice | The frst outdoor season |
| 2013 | King Lear, A Midsummer Night's Dream | |
| 2014 | Twelfth Night, Romeo and Juliet | |
| 2015 | Macbeth, Much Ado About Nothing | |
| 2016 | Hamlet, As you Like It | |
| 2017 | The Tempest, The Taming of the Shrew | |
| 2018 | A Midsummer Night's Dream, The Winter's Tale | |
| 2019 | The Merchant of Venice, The Two Gentlemen of Verona | The New Swan Shakespeare Center is established |
| 2020-2021 | A Midsummer Night's Zoom, Wherein I See Myself, All the World's Stage | Filmed productions |
| 2022 | The Comedy of Errors, Pericles | |
| 2023 | As You Like It, Julius Caesar, The Complete Works of William Shakespeare (abridged) (revised) (redone) | The first season featuring three plays |
| 2024 | Twelfth Night, Measure for Measure | |
| 2025 | All's Well that Ends Well, Much Ado About Nothing | |
| 2026 | Romeo and Juliet, The Merry Wives of Windsor Cove | |
| 2027 | Cymbeline, A Midsummer Night's Dream | |
