= Shakespeare: The Critical Heritage =

Six-volume work by Brian Vickers

- Cover of Volume 4
- Editor: Brian Vickers
- Language: English
- Genre: Non-fiction
- Publisher: Routledge & Kegan Paul
- Publication date: 1974-1981
- ISBN: 978-0-415-13403-3

Shakespeare: The Critical Heritage also known as William Shakespeare: The Critical Heritage is a six-volume work edited by Brian Vickers. Volumes 1 through 3 were published in 1974 and 1975 by Routledge & Kegan Paul. Vickers' "Critical Heritage" is described as a "...more or less complete collection of criticisms of Shakespeare's works." Additionally, this set was expected to span three centuries by the time Volume 3 was available. Vickers as the editor, wrote digestible introductions to each volume and easy to read headnotes throughout. Volume 6 covers the years of 1774 to 1801, and was published in 1981. The complete set covers viewpoints on Shakespeare's work "from 1623 through to 1801."
