= Brian Vickers (literary scholar) =

British academic (born 1937)

- Born: December 13, 1937 (age 88); Cardiff
- Occupation: University Professor
- Notable work: The Oxford Francis Bacon

Sir Brian William Vickers FBA (born 13 December 1937) is a British academic, now Emeritus Professor at ETH Zurich. He is known for his work on the history of rhetoric, Shakespeare, John Ford, and Francis Bacon. He joined the English department at University College London as a visiting professor in 2012.

== Life ==
He was born in Cardiff, educated at St Marylebone Grammar School, London and at Trinity College, Cambridge, graduating Bachelor of Arts in 1962 with a Double First in English, winning both the Charles Oldham Shakespeare Scholarship and the Harness Shakespeare Essay Prize. He was awarded his doctorate from Cambridge in 1967, and was a fellow of Downing College from 1966 to 1971 during which time he directed studies in English. In 1972 he became professor ordinarius at ETH Zurich.

He has been a fellow of the British Academy since 1998 (Corresponding, Ordinary Fellow from 2003) and a senior research fellow at the Institute of English Studies, University of London since 2004. He was knighted for services to literary scholarship in the New Year Honours of 2008. He is the general editor of an old-spelling edition of the Complete Works of John Ford, published by Oxford University Press.

== Works ==
- (ed.) The Man of Feeling by Henry Mackenzie (1967)
- Francis Bacon and Renaissance Prose (1968)
- The Artistry of Shakespeare's Prose (1968)
- The World of Jonathan Swift: essays for the tercentenary (1968)
- (ed.) Essential articles for the study of Francis Bacon (1968)
- (ed.) Seventeenth-century Prose: an anthology (1969)
- Classical Rhetoric in English Poetry (1970)
- Towards Greek Tragedy: drama, myth, society (1973)
- (ed.) Shakespeare: The Critical Heritage (six volumes, 1974–81)
- Francis Bacon (1978)
- Frances Yates and the Writing of History (1979)
- Shakespeare's Hypocrites (1979)
- Rhetorical and Anti-rhetorical Tropes : on writing the history of elocution (1981)
- (ed.) Shakespeare: Coriolanus (1981)
- (ed.) Rhetoric Revalued: papers from the International Society for the History of Rhetoric (1982)
- Epideictic and Epic in the Renaissance (1983)
- Epideictic rhetoric in Galileo's "Dialogo" (1983)
- (ed.) Occult and Scientific Mentalities in the Renaissance (1984)
- Rhetoric and the Pursuit of Truth: language change in the 17th and 18th centuries (1985)
- Public and Private Life in the Seventeenth Century: the Mackenzie-Evelyn debate (1986)
- English Science, Bacon to Newton (1987)
- In Defence of Rhetoric (1988)
- Returning to Shakespeare (1989)
- "Leisure and Idleness in the Renaissance: the ambivalence of otium". Renaissance Studies. 4 (1). Society for Renaissance Studies: 1–37. 1990. doi:10.1111/j.1477-4658.1990.tb00408.x. eISSN 1477-4658.
- Arbeit, Musse, Meditation : Studies in the Vita activa and Vita contemplativa (1991)
- Appropriating Shakespeare: contemporary critical quarrels (1993)
- (ed.) The history of the reign of King Henry VII and selected works by Francis Bacon (1998)
- (ed.) The Essays or Counsels, Civil and Moral by Francis Bacon (1999)
- (ed.) English Renaissance Literary Criticism (1999)
- Shakespeare, Co-author: a historical study of the five collaborative plays (2002)
- (ed.) Francis Bacon, The Major Works: [including New Atlantis and the Essays] (2002)
- Counterfeiting Shakespeare: evidence, authorship, and John Ford's Funerall elegye (2002)
- (ed. with William Baker) The Merchant of Venice (2005)
- Shakespeare, A Lover's Complaint, and John Davies of Hereford (2007)
- The One King Lear (2016)
- Thomas Kyd: A Dramatist Restored (2024)

== See also ==
- Otium
