= Arthur Kirsch =

American literary critic (born 1932)

- Born: Arthur C. Kirsch; 1932 (age 93–94)
- Occupation: Literary critic

Arthur C. Kirsch (born 1932) is an American literary critic noted for his scholarly writings on Shakespeare, Dryden, and W. H. Auden. He taught for many years at the University of Virginia, where he is now professor emeritus.

Books:

- Jacobean Dramatic Perspectives, 1972
- Dryden's Heroic Drama, 1972
- The Passions of Shakespeare's Tragic Heroes, 1990
- Shakespeare and the Experience of Love, 1991
- W. H. Auden, Lectures on Shakespeare (editor), 2002
- W. H. Auden, The Sea and the Mirror: A Commentary on Shakespeare' "The Tempest" (editor), 2005
- Auden and Christianity, 2005
