= Sam Wanamaker Award =

The Sam Wanamaker Award or Sam Wanamaker Prize is an award established in 1994 for pioneering work in Shakespearean theatre, usually given to individuals who have worked closely with the Shakespeare's Globe or the Royal Shakespeare Company; the award is not specific to artistic contribution, and has frequently been granted to businessmen and academics. It is one of the two current British awards for classical theatre, alongside the Ian Charleson Award. It is presented by the Shakespeare's Globe and named after Sam Wanamaker, the theatre's founder.

== Winners ==
- 2026 – Al Pacino, actor
- 2025 – Darren Raymond, theatre educator and co-founder of the Intermission Youth Theatre initiative, which "provides training in Shakespearian drama to young people at risk of offending or exclusion"
- 2024 – Farah Karim-Cooper, academic
- 2022 – Joseph Marcell, actor (awarded in 2023 due to COVID-19 restrictions)
- 2019 – Diana Devlin
- 2018 – Thelma Holt
- 2017 – 25 Globe volunteers
- 2016 – Gordon McMullan, professor of English at King's College London, founder of "Shakespeare 400" quatercentenary celebrations.
- 2015 – Christopher Plummer, actor
- 2014 – Ralph Alan Cohen, co-founder of the American Shakespeare Center
- 2013 – Michael Sydney Perry, British business executive
- 2012 – Gregory Doran, artistic director of Royal Shakespeare Company
- 2011 – Glynn MacDonald, Resident Master of Movement at Shakespeare's Globe, and Giles Block, Resident Master of Verse and Play at Shakespeare's Globe
- 2010 – Professor Stanley Wells CBE, Shakespeare scholar and author
- 2008 – Andrew Gurr, theater historian
- 2007 – Jenny Tiramani, Claire van Kampen and Mark Rylance
- 2006 – Dawn Saunders QSM, CEO of the Shakespeare's Globe Centre in New Zealand
- 2004 – John Orrell, Canadian scholar and theatre historian
- 2003 – Stephen Unwin and Barrie Rutter, Directors of English Touring Theatre and Northern Broadsides respectively
- 2002 – Paul Scofield CBE
- 2001 – John Barton CBE
- 2000 – Cicely Berry
- 1999 – Glynne Wickham
- 1998 – Janet Arnold
- 1996 – William Hutt
- 1995 – Leon Garfield
- 1994 – Dr. Rex Gibson

== See also ==
- Ian Charleson Awards
- Shakespeare's Globe
- Sam Wanamaker
