= Ralph Cohen =

Ralph Cohen may refer to:

- Ralph Louis Cohen (born 1952), American mathematician
- Ralph Alan Cohen (born 1945), American educator, scholar theatre director, and academic entrepreneur
