= Shakespeare in Action =

Shakespeare in Action is a Toronto-based, multi-racial Shakespearean theatre company for young audiences. The company brings Shakespeare's plays to children and students across Toronto. Founded in 1988 by Artistic Director Michael Kelly, Shakespeare in Action offers theater-related programming for students, teachers and the community.

== History ==
Shakespeare in Action was founded in 1988 by Michael Kelly, a classically trained actor who has worked in Canada and the United States teaching Shakespeare. In 1991, the company performed for young offenders in prison, and from 1993 to 1996 toured productions of Romeo and Juliet, Julius Caesar, Macbeth, and A Midsummer Night's Dream to schools in the Greater Toronto Area. In 1996, they began producing mainstage productions, starting with Romeo and Juliet. In 1999, they traveled to New Zealand to work with the National Youth Drama School and Shakespeare Globe Centre. In 2006, they partnered with the Toronto Public Library to create the Shakespeare for Kids Library Club, a free program where children learn how to act out Shakespeare's plays themselves. Over the past few years, the company has expanded its programming and has become the Artist Company in Residence at Central Commerce Collegiate Institute just west of downtown Toronto. Shakespeare in Action has served over 500,000 audience members in its 22 years.

In 2009 the company became the Artist Company in Residence at Toronto's Central Commerce Collegiate Institute.

== Organization ==
The company focuses on demystifying Shakespeare's language and encouraging students to identify with the stories within the plays. The company's main stage productions use Shakespeare's original text, and their workshops and youth programs help students to work through the text and explore the historical background of the plays and the process behind production, often through group performance.

Shakespeare in Action is a non-profit organization registered with the Canada Revenue Agency. They operate under the jurisdiction of the Canadian Actors' Equity Association, hiring only professional actors, and have memberships with many professional organizations including the Professional Association of Canadian Theatres, the Toronto Alliance for the Performing Arts, and Theatre Ontario.

=== Artistic director ===
Michael Kelly is the founder and artistic director of Shakespeare in Action. He is an actor, director, producer, teacher, and arts educator who has directed many contemporary and Shakespearean plays and taught master classes for The Stratford Festival, the Kentucky Shakespeare Festival, and Shakespeare's Globe Theatre in London. Kelly is a part-time member of the Theatre Faculty at York University. He has also taught acting at George Brown College, Randolph Academy for the Arts, and the National Youth Drama School in New Zealand.
