= Stanley Wells =

Shakespearean scholar (born 1930)

Sir Stanley Wells CBE
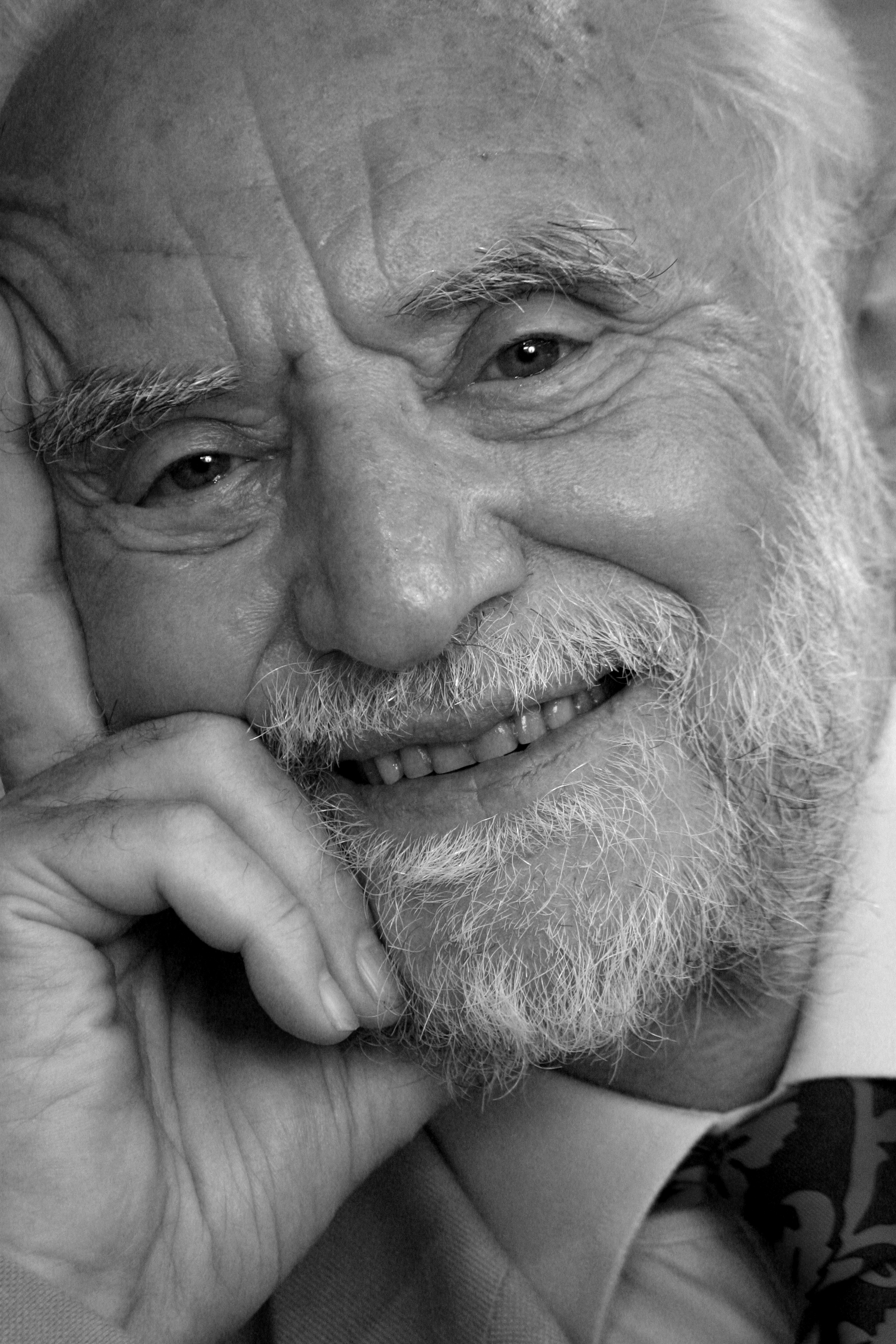
- Wells in 2012
- Born: 21 May 1930 (age 96); Hull, England
- Education: Kingston High School
- Alma mater: University College London; University of Birmingham
- Occupations: Shakespearean scholar, writer, professor and editor
- Known for: Editor of the Oxford Shakespeare and New Penguin Shakespeare
- Spouse(s): Susan Hill, separated 2011
- Awards: Sam Wanamaker Award

Sir Stanley William Wells (born 21 May 1930) is an English Shakespearean scholar, writer, professor and editor who has been honorary president of the Shakespeare Birthplace Trust, professor emeritus at the University of Birmingham, and author of many books about Shakespeare, including Shakespeare Sex and Love, and is general editor of the Oxford Shakespeare and New Penguin Shakespeare series. He lives in Stratford-upon-Avon and was educated in English at University College London (UCL).

== Biography ==
Wells was born in Hull, the son of Stanley Cecil Wells and Doris Wells. His father was a bus company traffic manager. Wells was educated at the Kingston High School grammar school in Hull. He took a degree in English at University College London. He was invalided out of national service for the RAF in 1951. He became a Hampshire school teacher before moving to Stratford to complete his PhD degree. He was awarded his doctorate in English by the University of Birmingham in 1961.

He was Professor of Shakespeare Studies and director of the Shakespeare Institute at the University of Birmingham from 1988 to 1997, and is now emeritus professor of Shakespeare Studies.

Wells is co-editor (with Gary Taylor, John Jowett and William Montgomery) of the Oxford Complete Works and (with Michael Dobson) the Oxford Companion to Shakespeare, and has been general editor of the Oxford Shakespeare series since 1978. He edited several volumes for the New Penguin Shakespeare series.

In 2009, Wells revealed the existence of the Cobbe portrait. He stated his belief, based on three years of research, that the portrait is a true portrait of Shakespeare, painted from life.

On 20 October 2009, Wells appeared on BBC Four's comedy panel show It's Only a Theory, defending the prevailing opinion within contemporary Shakespeare studies that "The plays of William Shakespeare were written by William Shakespeare of Stratford-Upon-Avon" and debunking the theory that Shakespeare's plays were written by some of his contemporaries.

In June 2010, Wells was awarded the Sam Wanamaker Award by Shakespeare's Globe, an award given annually in the name of the Globe's founder Sam Wanamaker to celebrate work that has increased the understanding and enjoyment of Shakespeare.

In 2013, alongside the Rev Dr Paul Edmondson, he called upon the Dean and Chapter of Westminster Abbey to remove the question mark that appears in place of a date of death in the memorial window to Christopher Marlowe in Poets' Corner in Westminster Abbey.

== Personal life ==
Wells remains married to novelist Susan Hill, though separated in 2011, and the couple was once considered part of the "Gloucestershire mafia" set of well-connected writers and socialites. He is the father of author Jessica Ruston and of Clemency Wells. Imogen, Hill and Wells's second-born child, died in infancy.

== Honours ==
Wells was appointed a Commander of the Order of the British Empire (CBE) in the 2007 Birthday Honours for services to literature. He was knighted in the 2016 Birthday Honours for services to scholarship.

Wells was awarded an honorary DLitt degree by the University of Warwick in 2008. He was elected a Fellow of the Royal Society of Literature in 2014.

In 2016, he was awarded the President's Medal by the British Academy "for his lifetime service to the study, knowledge and enjoyment of William Shakespeare".

=== Commonwealth honours ===
Country	Date	Appointment	Post-nominal letters
United Kingdom	2007	Commander of the Order of the British Empire	CBE
United Kingdom	2016	Knight Bachelor	

=== Scholastic ===
Honorary degrees

Location	Date	School	Degree	Gave Commencement Address
England	2008	University of Warwick	Doctor of Letters (DLitt)	

== Awards ==
Location	Date	Institution	Award
England	June 2010	Shakespeare's Globe	Sam Wanamaker Award
United Kingdom	2016	British Academy	President's Medal

== Major publications ==
- Re-Editing Shakespeare for the Modern Reader (1984)
- The Oxford Dictionary of Shakespeare (1998)
- Shakespeare in the Theatre: An Anthology of Criticism (2000)
- Shakespeare: The Poet and his Plays (2001)
- The Oxford Shakespeare: King Lear (2001)
- Shakespeare For All Time (2002)
- The Oxford Shakespeare: The Complete Works (with Gary Taylor, John Jowett, and William Montgomery 1986, 2005)
- Shakespeare & Co. (2006)
- Shakespeare, Sex, and Love (2010)
- Shakespeare Beyond Doubt (editor with Paul Edmondson, 2013)
- Great Shakespearean Actors (2015)
- The Shakespeare Circle (editor, 2016)
- All the Sonnets of Shakespeare (with Paul Edmondson, 2020)
