= Diana Devlin =

London based teacher, author and theatre academic

Diana Devlin (1 April 1941 - 27 September 2020) was a London based teacher, author and theatre academic who helped to create the Shakespeare's Globe theatre with her associate Sam Wanamaker.

== Life ==
Devlin was born in Porthmadog, Wales on 1 April 1941. She studied at Beaufort House primary school in Fulham, and then at Carlyle grammar school in Chelsea, where she was head girl at the school. In 1960, she attended Cambridge University and obtained a second-class degree in English Literature. During her time at Cambridge she became close friends with the actress Miriam Margolyes. She married the actor Will Graham in 1968 but they divorced a few years later. After attending Cambridge, she was awarded a Fulbright scholarship and subsequently gained a doctorate in theatre arts from the University of Minnesota. After graduation, Devlin became a lecturer in drama at Goldsmiths, University of London.

Devlin was a key figure in the development of the Shakespeare's Globe theatre. This began with her running the theatre's first summer school, which took place in 1972. In 1985, she became the administrator of the theatre. In 1997, Devlin was appointed as a trustee of the theatre and would later act as the deputy chair of the council from 2013.

In 1989, she married David Ogden but the marriage also ended in divorce.

Between 1993 and 2013 she was the head of theatre studies at the Guildhall School of Music and Drama in London.

Devlin died on 27 September 2020. The cause of death was pneumonia.

== Awards ==
In June 2019, she received the Sam Wanamaker Award in recognition of her pioneering support of the Globe for 47 years.

== Publications ==
- A Speaking Part: Lewis Casson and the Theatre of His Time, Hodder & Stoughton, 1982.
- Mask and Scene: Introduction to a World View of Theatre, Scarecrow Press, 1989.
- Sam Wanamaker: A Global Performer, Oberon Books, 2019.
- The Casson Family in North Wales: A Story of Slate and More, Gwasg Carreg Gwalch, 2019.
