= Jon Provost =

American actor

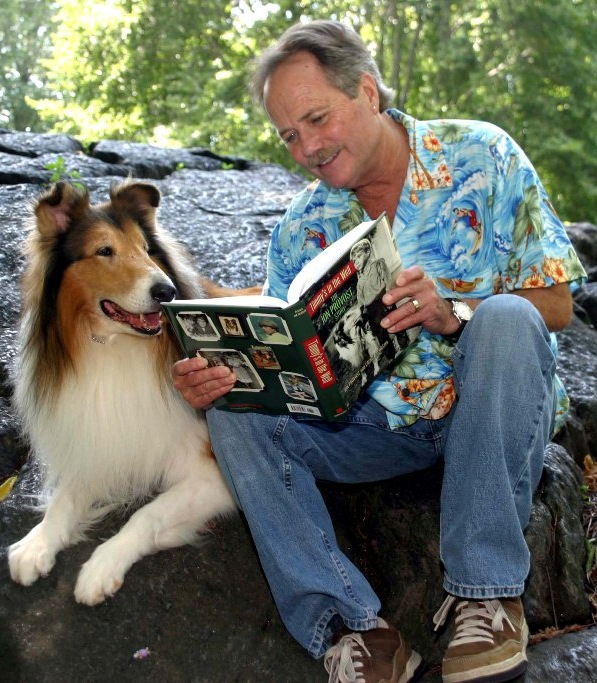
- Provost reading his autobiography Timmy's in the Well in 2009
- Born: Jonathan Bion Provost; March 12, 1950 (age 76); Los Angeles, California, U.S.
- Occupation: Actor
- Years active: 1953–present
- Spouses: Sandra Goosens (m. 1979; div. 1993) Laurie Jacobson (m. 1999)
- Children: 2
- Website: jonprovost.com

Jonathan Bion Provost (born March 12, 1950) is an American actor, best known for his role as young Timmy Martin in the CBS series Lassie.

== Life and career ==
Provost was born in Los Angeles. Provost was cast in the film The Country Girl (1954), starring Bing Crosby and Grace Kelly. He then appeared in Back from Eternity (1956) with Anita Ekberg and Escapade in Japan (1957), with Teresa Wright, Cameron Mitchell, and an unknown and uncredited Clint Eastwood.

In 1957, Provost won the role of Timmy Martin in the CBS television series Lassie. He joined the show at the top of the fourth season as co-star with Tommy Rettig, Jan Clayton, and George Cleveland. Midway through the season, George Cleveland died and Rettig and Clayton departed. Lassie was revamped to focus on Provost as Timmy. The following year, he met June Lockhart on the set, who would play his mother Ruth Martin and would remain close friends until her death on October 23, 2025. Provost is the last surviving regular cast member of the series. On December 25, 1958, Provost and Lassie were holiday guests on NBC's The Ford Show, Starring Tennessee Ernie Ford.

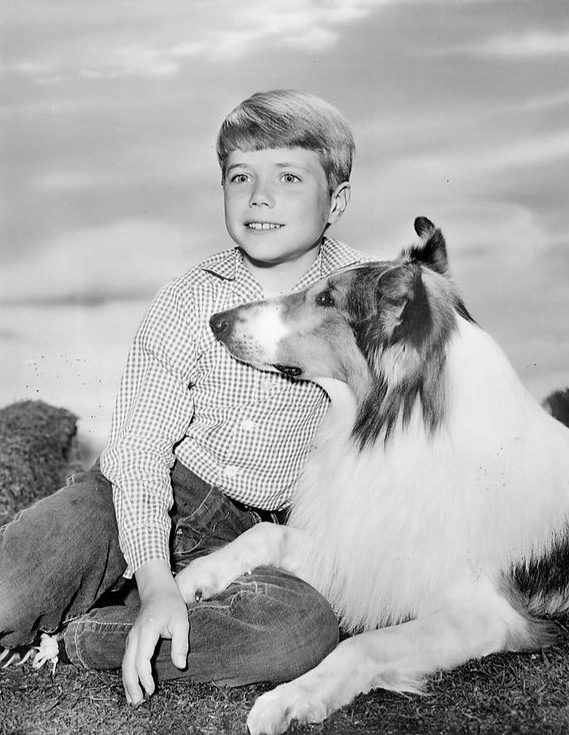
Provost as Timmy Martin in the television series Lassie, c. 1962

For seven seasons, 1957–1964, audiences grew to love Timmy and his adventures with Lassie.(CN) Timmy's canine companion was played by three dogs that were all descendants of Pal, the original Lassie from the Metro-Goldwyn-Mayer films: Pal's son Lassie Jr. and his grandsons Baby and Spook. In a 2014 interview, Provost said, "I worked with Baby for five years straight. Obviously, he and I really bonded. He was my favorite and I also thought he was the most intelligent of the ones I worked with. They were all great dogs."

In 1964, however, Provost was 14 and chose not to renew his contract, although the sponsor Campbell's Soup Company wanted three more years.

Provost continued working in television and films, including This Property is Condemned with Natalie Wood and Robert Redford and The Computer Wore Tennis Shoes with Kurt Russell. :Provost left Hollywood for college at Sonoma State University and chose to remain there, returning for occasional roles. Later, he sold real estate in Sonoma County, California and donated his time to various causes such as the Humane Society, Easter Seals, Canine Companions for Independence and local charities. Provost also attends celebrity conventions and autograph shows and works for other animal causes.

In 1990, Provost was honored by the Young Artist Foundation with its Former Child Star "Lifetime Achievement" Award for his role as Timmy Martin on the original Lassie series, and in 1989, he returned to television with a recurring role on The New Lassie series as real estate agent Steve McCullough.

In 1994, Provost received a star on the Hollywood Walk of Fame at 7080 Hollywood Blvd. His memoir, Timmy's in the Well: The Jon Provost Story, was released in December 2007 (Cumberland House Publishing, ISBN 978-1581826197). In August 2008, Provost was honored with a "Lifetime Achievement Award" at the Pocono Mountains Film Festival. He has collaborated as a writer with his second wife author Laurie Jacobson.

== Filmography ==
| Year | Title | Role | Notes |
|---|---|---|---|
| 1953 | So Big | Dirk - Age 2 | Uncredited |
| 1954 | The Country Girl | Johnnie Elgin | Uncredited |
| 1956 | He Laughed Last | Child | Uncredited |
| 1956 | Back from Eternity | Tommy Malone | |
| 1956 | Toward the Unknown | Joe Craven Jr. | Uncredited |
| 1957 | All Mine to Give | Robbie Eunson - age 6 | |
| 1957 | Escapade in Japan | Tony / Tony Saunders | |
| 1957-1964 | Lassie | Timmy Martin / Timmy Claussen | TV series, 249 episodes |
| 1963 | Lassie's Christmas Tail | Timmy Martin | |
| 1963 | Lassie's Great Adventure | Timmy Martin | |
| 1965 | Mister Ed | Himself | |
| 1966 | This Property Is Condemned | Tom | |
| 1969 | The Computer Wore Tennis Shoes | Bradley | starring Kurt Russell |
| 1970 | The Secret of the Sacred Forest | Jimmi | |
| 1989-1991 | The New Lassie | Timmy Martin / Steve McCullough | TV series; 48 episodes |
| 1992 | Star Time | Paramedic #2 | |
| 1998 | Playing Patti | Himself | |
| 2013 | Susie's Hope | Don Vaughan, a former member of the North Carolina State Senate | (last film role to-date) |

=== Radio ===
| Year | Title | Role | Notes |
|---|---|---|---|
| 2023 | Heroes of Extinction | Henry Price (voice) | 1 episode (audio drama) |

== Bibliography ==
- Goldrup, Tom and Jim (October 6, 2015). Growing Up on the Set: Interviews with 39 Former Child Actors of Film and Television. McFarland & Co. pp. 357–358. ISBN 978-1476613703.
- Holmstrom, John (1996). The Moving Picture Boy: An International Encyclopaedia from 1895 to 1995. Norwich: Michael Russell. pp. 279–280. ISBN 978-0859551786.
