= Marc Wanamaker =

American historian and author (born 1947)

- Born: Marc Norman Wanamaker; October 1, 1947 (age 78); Los Angeles, California, United States
- Occupations: Historian, author
- Relatives: Sam Wanamaker (uncle); Zoë Wanamaker (cousin)

Marc Norman Wanamaker (born October 1, 1947) is an American historical author, writing on early Los Angeles and Hollywood. He is the founder of Bison Archives, which manages research on the motion picture industry. He helped form and worked with the American Film Institute. He was a co-founder of the Los Angeles International Film Exposition and American Cinematheque.

== Bison Archives ==
Bison Archives was founded by Wanamaker in 1971. Bison consults for motion picture and television productions, museums, libraries and other media and historical societies and institutions worldwide. Bison gets its name from “Bison Life Motion Pictures” also called “Bison Films,” which itself was founded in 1909.

== Published books ==
- The Hollywood Reporter - Star Profiles edited by Marc Wanamaker (1984)
- Happy Birthday Hollywood 1987 Motion Picture and Television Fund (Marc Wanamaker major contributor to book)
- Reel Women : Pioneers of the Cinema, 1896 to the Present by Ally Acker Foreword by Judith Crist; Afterword by Marc Wanamaker (1991)
- Hollywood Handbook-Chateau Marmont 1996 by Andre Balazs Universe Publ. (Contributor to several articles in book)
- Hollywood Haunted: A Ghostly Tour of Filmland by Laurie Jacobson and Marc Wanamaker (1999)
- Destined for Hollywood: The Art of Dan Sayre Grosbeak by Robert Henning Jr., Marc Wanamaker, et al. (2001)
- Hollywood Views of the Past and Present by Marc Wanamaker and George Ross Jezek (2002)
- Los Angeles Past and Present 2004 by George Jezek and Marc Wanamaker
- Early Beverly Hills by Marc Wanamaker (2005)
- Historic Hollywood: An Illustrated History by Robert W. Nudelman and Marc Wanamaker (2005)
- Beverly Hills, 1930-2005 (Images of America) by Marc Wanamaker (2006)
- Early Hollywood by Marc Wanamaker and Robert W Nudelman (2007)
- Theatres in Los Angeles (Images of America: California) by Suzanne Tarbell Cooper, Amy Ronnebeck Hall, Marc Wanamaker, et al. (2008)
- Beverly Hills, 1930-2005 (Postcards of America: California) by Marc Wanamaker (2008)
- Hollywood, 1940-2008 by Marc Wanamaker (2009)
- Early Warner Bros. Studios by E.J. Stephens and Marc Wanamaker (2010)
- Westwood by Marc Wanamaker (2010)
- Location Filming in Los Angeles by Karie Bible, Marc Wanamaker, et al. (2010)
- San Fernando Valley (Images of America) by Marc Wanamaker (2011)
- Movie Studios of Culver City by Lugo Cerra, Marc Wanamaker, et al. (2011)
- Malibu (Images of America) by Ben Marcus and Marc Wanamaker (2011)
- San Fernando Valley (Postcards of America) by Marc Wanamaker (2011)
- Griffith Park (Images of America) by E.J. Stephens and Marc Wanamaker (2011)
- Early Paramount Studios by E J Stephens, Michael Christaldi, et al. (2013)
- Warner Bros.: Hollywood's Ultimate Backlot by Steven Bingen, Doris Day, Mark Wanamaker, et al. (2014)
- Early Poverty Row Studios (Images of America) by E.J. Stephens and Marc Wanamaker (2014)
- Max Factor and Hollywood: A Glamorous History by Erika Thomas, Marc Wanamaker, et al. (2016)
- Paramount Studios: 1940-2000 by Marc Wanamaker, Michael Christaldi, et al. (2016)
- Hollywood's Lost Backlot: 40 Acres of Glamour and Mystery, by Steven Bingen with Marc Wanamaker (2018)
- Hollywood on the Santa Monica Beach 2023 by Marc Wanamaker and Arthur Verge, Arcadia Publishing
- Columbia Pictures 2024 by Jim Pauley and Marc Wanamaker, Lyons Press
- Hollywood Behind the Lens 2024 by Marc Wanamaker and Steven Bingen, Lyons Press

== Personal life ==
Wanamaker is a native of Los Angeles, California. He is the nephew of actor Sam Wanamaker and cousin of actress Zoë Wanamaker.
