= Shakespeare Center of Los Angeles =

- Formation: 1986; 40 years ago
- Type: Theatre group
- Purpose: Performances of Shakespeare plays outdoors and indoors around Los Angeles
- Location: Los Angeles, California
- Artistic director: Ben Donenberg
- Website: shakespearecenter.org

The Shakespeare Center of Los Angeles (SCLA) is a not-for-profit 501(c)(3) theatre company based in Los Angeles, California, that stages outdoor and indoor Shakespeare plays and produces the Simply Shakespeare series of benefit readings around Los Angeles. The Center also provides arts-based opportunities for veterans and at-risk youth.

The Center was founded in 1986 by Ben Donenberg, who serves as its artistic director.

== History ==
The Shakespeare Center of Los Angeles was founded in 1986 as Shakespeare Festival/LA, by Ben Donenberg, a graduate of The Juilliard School. His goal was to replicate the tradition of summertime Shakespeare performances in New York's Central Park. He secured funding from Citicorp/Citibank, the Los Angeles Community Redevelopment Agency and Leonore Gershwin, the widow of composer Ira Gershwin, and staged the first Shakespeare Festival/L.A. in 1986, presenting Twelfth Night in Pershing Square. Attendees were asked to donate canned food in exchange for admission, a program the Center named "Food for Thought". Louis Fantasia serves as Artistic Associate to SCLA.

In 1989, actress Rita Wilson, who had recently married the actor Tom Hanks, appeared in the Center's production of As You Like It. Starting in 1991, Wilson and Hanks went on to host Simply Shakespeare, the Center's annual benefit reading of Shakespeare's plays.

In the early 90s, the Center began hosting outdoor Shakespeare theatre performances at the West Los Angeles Veteran's Administration Medical Center's (VA) Japanese Garden.

In 1993, a partnership with Los Angeles city government, led to the creation of the SCLA’s Will Power to Youth program that employs at-risk teenagers to put on Shakespeare-adapted plays.

In 1997, the Center staged Julius Caesar at LA's City Hall.

In 2000, Shakespeare Festival/LA purchased a 13,400 square feet building at First and Bixel streets in downtown L.A. for rehearsals and hosting youth programs, and to include a future theatre. In June and July, it staged its production of Much Ado About Nothing in Marina Del Rey, Pershing Square and Palos Verdes.

In the summer of 2001, the Center staged The Comedy of Errors at Pershing Square.

In July 2002, the Center staged Romeo and Juliet at Pershing Square.

In 2003, it continued its annual tradition of producing a play at Pershing Square, with a production of Merry Wives of Windsor. Also in 2003, the Will Power to Youth program was awarded the National Arts and Humanities Youth Program Award (then called the Coming Up Taller award) by the President's Committee on the Arts and Humanities.

In 2009, the Center auctioned off a speaking role to appear in A Comedy of Errors, alongside Tom Hanks and Rita Wilson.

In December 2010, the Center staged Much Ado About Nothing, featuring actress Helen Hunt, with musician Lyle Lovett headlining the accompanying band.

In 2012, the Center launched Veterans in Art, continuing its work started in the early 90s with the VA, to bring military veterans and actors together to create theatre productions.

In July 2013, the Center launched a production of A Midsummer Night's Dream, at the VA campus' Japanese Garden. In September, the Center hosted a benefit reading of The Two Gentlemen of Verona at the Broad Stage at Santa Monica College, as part of the Center's 23rd annual Simply Shakespeare program. The event included the actor Tom Hanks, musician Paul McCartney and actor William Shatner.

In 2014, the production had to move to Santa Monica College due to an ACLU lawsuit against commercial businesses that the ACLU claimed were misusing VA land. In September, singer Paul Simon participated in the Simply Shakespeare benefit performance of As You Like It, along with William Shatner and actor Martin Short, at UCLA's Freud Playhouse.

In August 2016, the Center staged Twelfth Night at Santa Monica College.

In June 2018, the Center returned to the Los Angeles VA with a performance of Henry IV, featuring Tom Hanks in the role of Falstaff in the actor's Los Angeles stage debut. Other actors included Hamish Linklater and Joe Morton. The play was directed by American director and playwright Daniel J. Sullivan, who combined William Shakespeare's Henry IV, Part 1 and Henry IV, Part 2 into a consolidated version. In October, the Center staged The Tragedie of Macbeth: An Immersive Experience as an immersive haunted house/play, in the Center's City West headquarters in downtown Los Angeles.

== Notable productions ==
- 1989 - As You Like It.
- 1997 - Julius Caesar
- 2000 - Much Ado About Nothing
- 2001 - The Comedy of Errors
- 2002 - Romeo and Juliet
- 2003 - Merry Wives of Windsor
- 2009 - A Comedy of Errors
- 2010 - Much Ado About Nothing
- 2013 - A Midsummer Night's Dream
- 2014 - As You Like It
- 2016 - Twelfth Night
- 2018 - Henry IV (a combination of parts I and II)
- 2018 - The Tragedie of Macbeth: An Immersive Experience

== Programs ==
The Shakespeare Center offers community outreach programs called Will Power to Schools, which provides Shakespeare training to teachers, and Will Power to Youth, which hires young Los Angeles residents to study Shakespeare and perform in the plays.

The Center runs the Veterans in Art program in conjunction with the Employment Services office at the West L.A. VA. Veterans in Art teaches veterans theatre industry skills, provides professional mentorship during the play production process, and provides tuition for veterans to enroll in technical theatre courses at Southern California community colleges.

The Center also awards the Crystal Quill Award to recipients whose efforts have helped promote Shakespeare education. Past recipients include directors Baz Luhrmann and Roland Emmerich.

In 2021, the Assistance to Arts Education program of the U.S. Department of Education awarded a five-year, $2 million grant to the Shakespeare Center of Los Angeles to establish the Shakespeare and Social Justice Project. This initiative built on more than thirty years of Will Power to Youth, a creative-arts youth workforce development program established in the 1990s in response to the police beating of Rodney King and the resulting violent social unrest in Los Angeles. Will Power supported youth self-expression and group exploration of social and power dynamics by developing meaningful theater productions with them. The Shakespeare and Social Justice project then created an English language arts curriculum for secondary school classrooms that adapted and integrated Will Power ideas, guided by the expertise of teaching artists from community-centered theater-making organizations, notably Cornerstone Theater and the National Conference for Community and Justice. After four years of work, the program was canceled as "not aligned with administrative priorities" in 2025: the project has been erased from the Shakespeare Center of Los Angeles site.
