= Hotel La Rose =

Historic building in Santa Rosa, California, US

- U.S. National Register of Historic Places
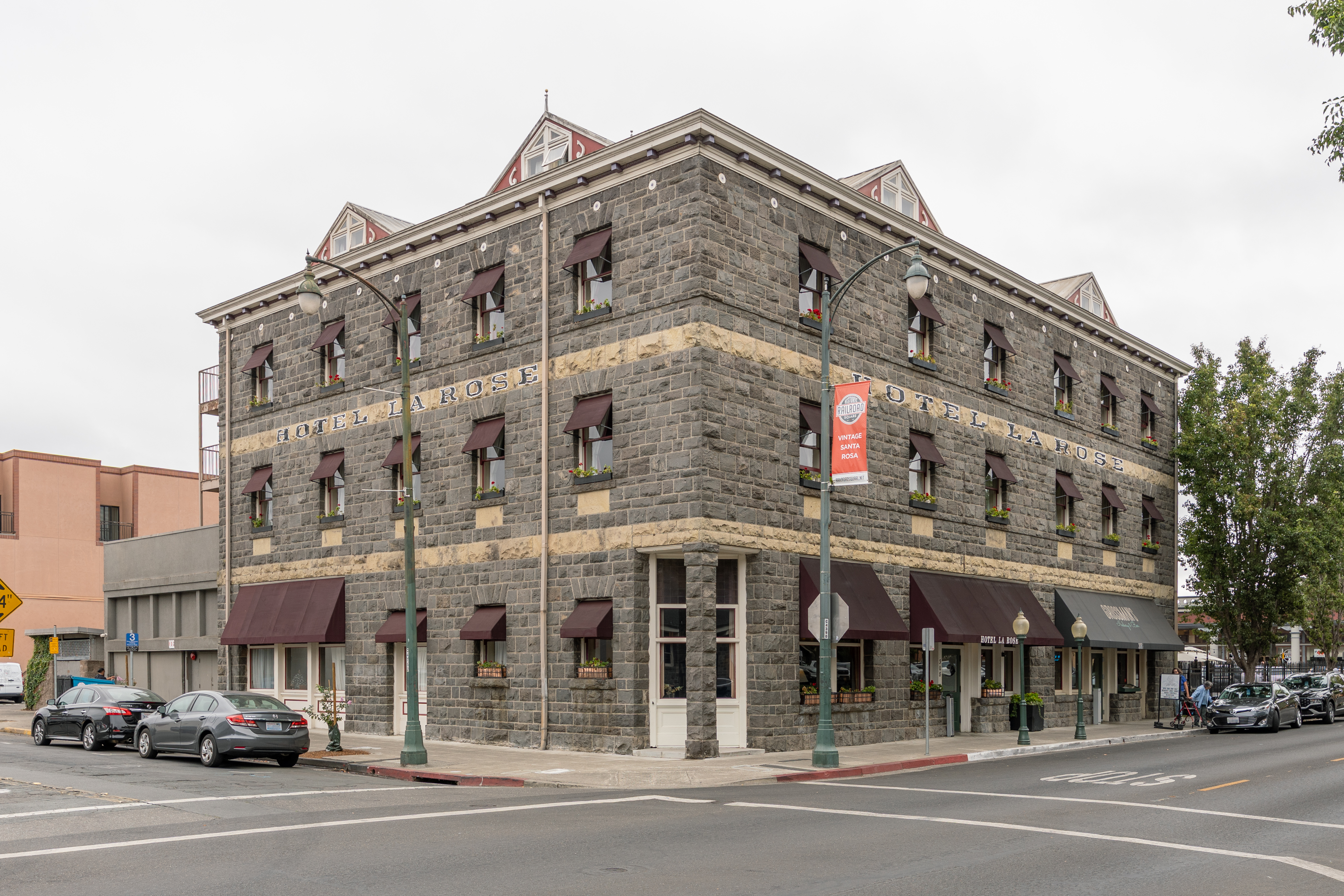
- Hotel in 2025

- Location within California
- Location: 5th and Wilson Sts., Santa Rosa, California
- Coordinates: 38.43793°N 122.72096°W
- Area: 0.2 acres (0.081 ha)
- Built: 1907
- Built by: Peter Maroni, Natale Forni, Massimo Galeazzi and Angelo Sodini
- Architectural style: Georgian Revival
- NRHP reference No.: 78000802
- Added to NRHP: August 3, 1978

The Hotel La Rose, at 5th and Wilson Sts. in Santa Rosa, California, was built in 1907, as a replacement for a predecessor building destroyed in the 1906 San Francisco earthquake. It was listed on the National Register of Historic Places in 1978.

It is a large three-story stone building, about 62 by 80 feet (19 m × 24 m) in plan, with walls 20 inches (0.51 m) to 24 inches (0.61 m) thick. Its styling includes aspect of Georgian Revival architecture.

It was built by stonemasons Peter Maroni, Natale Forni, Massimo Galeazzi, and Angelo Sodini of northern Italy, who "had acquired their skill of cutting hard stone in the Italian Marble Quarries." These stonemasons also built wineries, churches, libraries, railroad buildings, and other buildings in Santa Rosa and elsewhere in Sonoma County.

The stone it is built with is "'andesite, an indigenous rock of the volcanic group, which is difficult to work and used on buildings of monumental character, slabs for floors, wall lining and paving.' (History of Building Materials, Norman Davey, 1961) In 1907, the La Rose Hotel was conceived as a massive stone building of a substantial nature in contrast to the more vulnerable pre-earthquake construction. The only remaining hotel building after the 1906 disaster in Santa Rosa was the stone Western Hotel in Railroad Square adjacent to the La Rose Hotel and also built by Peter Maroni and Angelo Sodini."

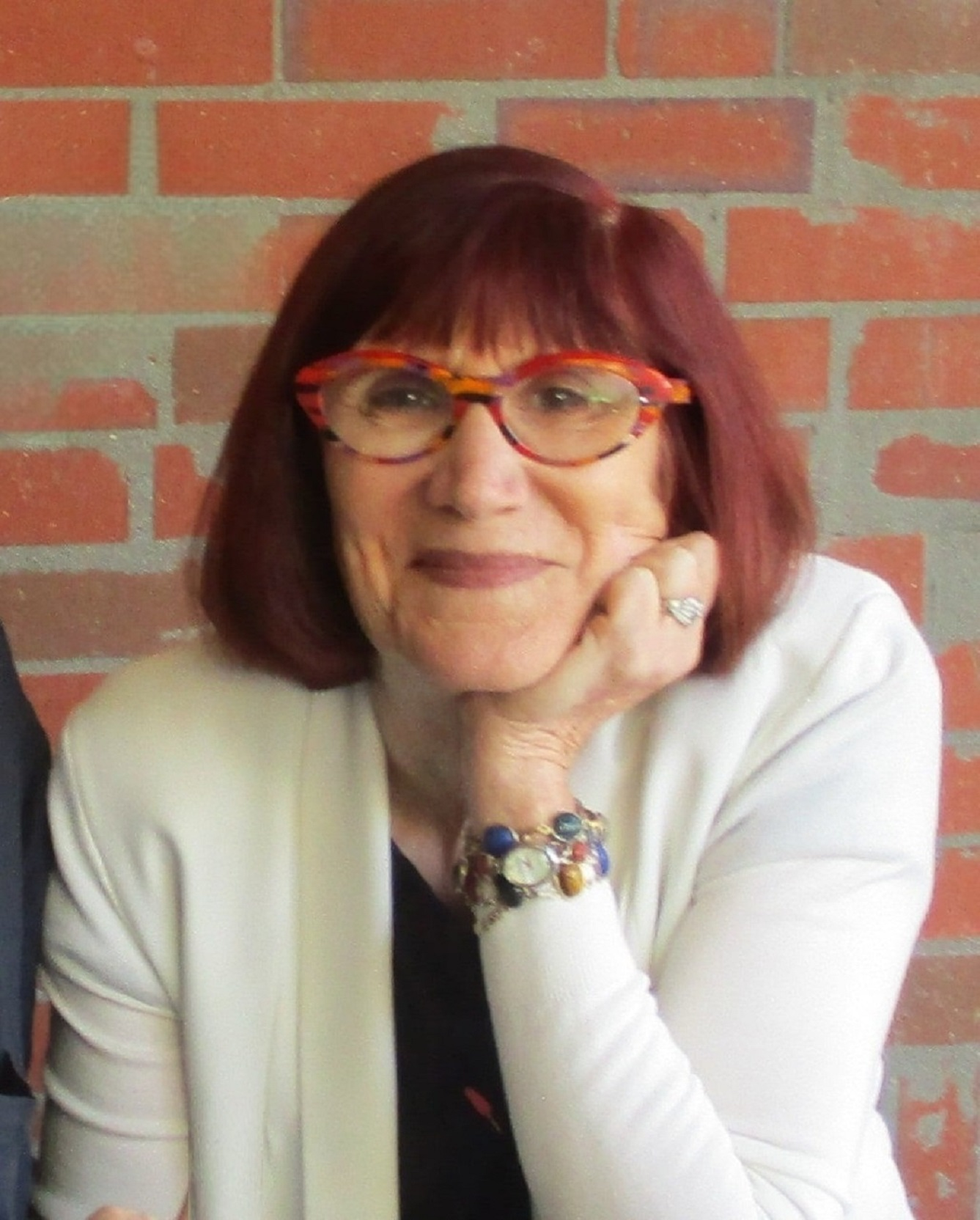
Author Laurie Jacobson having lunch at Hotel La Rose in 2025

It is an anchor of what is now known as Railroad Square, the portion of Santa Rosa's downtown that is on the west side of U.S. Route 101 and has the highest concentration of historic commercial buildings. Of particular note are the four rough-hewn stone buildings at its core, two of which are rare in that they predate the 1906 earthquake. They include the old Northwestern Pacific Railroad depot, prominently seen in the beginning and the end of the Alfred Hitchcock film Shadow of a Doubt, and the still-functioning Hotel La Rose, built in 1907 and registered as one of the National Trust for Historic Preservation's Historic Hotels of America.

"After the 1906 earthquake destroyed his renowned St. Rose Hotel, Bautista Bettini set out to build an even better property. Using stone from a quarry on the east side of Santa Rosa, Italian stonemasons built the four-story Hotel La Rose in 1907 in Railroad Square, an area of town that bustled with activity. The U.S. Department of the Interior listed Hotel La Rose on the National Register of Historic Places in 1977."

The hotel was run by Claus Neumann, "a renowned hotelier", who also operated the Los Robles Lodge on Cleveland Avenue in Santa Rosa.

Its lobby includes a staircase from the San Francisco Cable Car Barn. The hotel's restaurant is Grossman's Noshery and Bar.

Hotel La Rose became a member of the National Trust for Historic Preservation's Historic Hotels of America program in 1996.
