= Dawn Sanders =

New Zealand theatre scholar

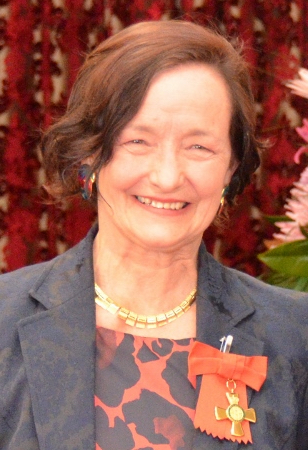
Sanders in 2013

Dawn Jane Sanders ONZM QSM is a New Zealand theatre scholar, and the founder and current CEO of the Shakespeare's Globe Centre New Zealand. She received the 2006 Sam Wanamaker Award for her foundation of this centre.

In the 1992 New Year Honours, Sanders was awarded the Queen's Service Medal for community service. In the 2013 Queen's Birthday Honours, she was appointed an Officer of the New Zealand Order of Merit, for services to theatre.
