= Louis Fantasia =

American theatre director and author

- Born: 1949 (age 76–77); Massachusetts
- Occupations: Theatre director, scholar, author
- Organization(s): Shakespeare's Globe; Huntington Library
- Notable work: Instant Shakespeare
- Honours: Order of Merit of the Federal Republic of Germany

Louis Fantasia (born 1949) is an American theatre director, author, Shakespeare scholar, and acting teacher. Fantasia was the director of the Shakespeare's Globe Teaching Shakespeare Through Performance Institute, after collaborating with Sam Wanamaker on the International Shakespeare's Globe Centre in London. He holds the distinction of being the first American to direct on the stage of Shakespeare's Globe, and is Artistic Associate of the Shakespeare Center of Los Angeles. Fantasia has directed over 150 productions for theaters throughout Europe, Asia, and the United States.

In 2003, the Council of Europe named its theatrical library in the European Parliament in Fantasia's honor. In 2016, Fantasia was awarded the Officer's Cross of the Order of Merit of the Federal Republic of Germany for his contributions to German culture and theatre. Also in 2016, Fantasia's work was the subject of a PBS documentary.

== Career ==
=== Educator and author ===
Throughout the 1980s, Fantasia collaborated with Sam Wanamaker by directing training programs and workshops for the International Shakespeare's Globe Centre in London. Their collaboration continued as Fantasia worked with Wanamaker on the reconstruction of Shakespeare's Globe.

In 1996, Fantasia became the first American director to direct on the reconstructed stage of Shakespeare's Globe, staging Much Ado About Nothing. The production's use of "Original Practices," was the subject of a televised documentary by TMW Media Group, and became the performance style which the company later became known for. In 1997, Fantasia became the director of the Globe's acting and directing workshops in London, which he ran for over ten years, as director of the Teaching Shakespeare Through Performance Institute.

In 2002, Fantasia's book Instant Shakespeare: a proven technique for actors, directors, and teachers, was published by Bloomsbury Publishing and later Methuen Drama. Fantasia also wrote Talking Shakespeare, Tragedy in the Age of Oprah, and is the general editor of the Playing Shakespeare series through Peter Lang Publishing.

Fantasia served as the director of Shakespeare at the Huntington Library in San Marino, California, conducting workshops on classical performance studies. He taught at the Juilliard School, USC School of Dramatic Arts, served as Dean of the New York Film Academy, Head of Acting at the London Theatre School, and President of Deep Springs College.Fantasia additionally taught, lectured, and served on panels for the Beijing Film Academy, Shanghai Theatre Academy, Beijing International Film Festival, and the Shanghai International Film Festival.

=== Director ===
As a director, Fantasia has produced and directed over 150 plays and operas for theaters and festivals internationally throughout Europe, Asia, and the United States.

In 1993, Fantasia received critical acclaim for directing the U.S. premiere of Sibera, starring Alan Mandell.

In 2018, Fantasia directed A Shakespeare Jubilee! at The Wallis in Beverly Hills, starring Malcolm McDowell, Michael York, Harry Hamlin, Jane Carr, Eric Braeden, Ioan Gruffud, Nigel Lythgoe, Xander Berkeley, Joe Spano, Joely Fischer, Isabella Hofmann, Lisa LoCicero, Suzan Crowley, and Luke Youngblood. In the 2020s, Fantasia directed staged readings of As You Like It, Hamlet, Twelfth Night, and Richard II at the Greystone Mansion in Beverly Hills.

=== Arts commentator ===
In addition to Fantasia's published works, he served as a theatre critic and arts commentator for KCRW. Fantasia frequently contributes essays and theatre reviews for the Huffington Post and Larchmont Chronicle.

=== Music ===
Fantasia is a bassist, having toured Berlin, Tokyo, and London to perform Patrick Süskind's one man show, The Double Bass. In 2000, Fantasia played the bass and starred in Peter Turrini's Enough.

== Personal life ==
Fantasia was born in 1949 in Massachusetts, and resides in Los Angeles.
