= Ally Acker =

American artist and historian

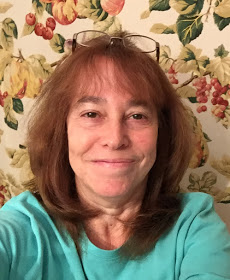
- Born: August 17, 1954 (age 72); New York City, U.S.
- Education: Northwestern University; Columbia University
- Occupations: Filmmaker; poet; author; historian

Ally Acker (born August 17, 1954, New York) is an American filmmaker, poet, author, and film historian. Her book, Reel Women: Pioneers of the Cinema, was the first on the market to reveal the entrepreneurial, and transformative roles that women played in all aspects of the film industry since its inception. Reel Women was optioned in 1995 for one of the first interactive CD-ROMs ever released, Reel Women: The Untold Story. In 2014, Acker directed the feature documentary, "Reel Herstory: The Real Story of Reel Women," hosted by Jodie Foster.

== Education and early career ==
At age seventeen, Ally Acker became the first woman to obtain a First Class Radiotelephone Operator license through the Federal Communications Commission, enabling the operation of radio transmitters. WOR AM radio in New York hired her at age eighteen to become their first female engineer. At WOR, Acker worked closely with radio legends Jean Shepherd, Joe Franklin, and Arlene Francis.

After graduating from Northwestern University in 1976, Acker made the foray into television as a video editor for WRC-TV, the NBC affiliate station in Washington, D.C. From 1977 to 1980, Acker also worked as a freelance radio producer for the Feminist Radio Network, where she interviewed Alice Walker, who had just completed her second novel, Meridian. The interview later aired on National Public Radio.

In 1978 Acker directed, produced, shot and edited the 16mm film, Silver Apples of the Moon, which later became a finalist for a Student Academy Award. She moved to New York in 1980 to pursue filmmaking. Her first job in New York was at Valkhan Films where she worked as assistant to film editor Sam Pollard. A year later, she was hired by NBC network as a video editor for The Today Show, and NBC Nightly News. Only a few months after that hire, Acker was recruited by The Today Show as a producer/writer, becoming the first technician to cross over into producing/writing at NBC in New York. Acker's first network produced stories featured hosts Jane Pauley and Tom Brokaw.

== 1980s–1990s ==
In 1985, Acker created The Reel Women Trust Foundation to honor untold stories of remarkable women in all fields who are left out traditional history sources. She began conducting on-camera interviews with the second wave of women film pioneers for The Reel Women Video Archives. Produced from 1985 to 1994, the interviewees include: Dede Allen, Margaret Booth, Kevin Brownlow, Martha Coolidge, Roger Corman, Donna Deitch, Lauren Shuler-Donner, Nora Ephron, Douglas Fairbanks Jr. Jodie Foster, Harriet Frank Jr., Lillian Gish, Lee Grant, Molly Haskell, Katharine Hepburn, Fay Kanin, Sherry Lansing, Carol Littleton, Rita Moreno, Brianne Murphy (with Michael Landon), Marcia Nasatir, Euzhan Palcy, Mala Powers, Buddy Rogers, Susan Seidelman, Fina Torres, Margarethe von Trotta, and Paula Weinstein. Acker donated the collection to the Academy Film Archive of the Academy of Motion Picture Arts and Sciences where it is housed for the use of film students and researchers as The Reel Women in Film Collection.

In 1985, Acker also interviewed famed Surrealist artist and writer, Leonora Carrington. The interview was later used in Acker's film portrait of Carrington's life and work, The Flowering of the Crone: Leonora Carrington, Another Reality (2012–2014). The film is the only authorized film portrait of Carrington to be produced in the United States.

In 1987, Acker obtained her Masters of Fine Arts (MFA) in film and poetry from Columbia University. Her thesis screenplay, The Mathematical Mermaid about the life of Sonya Kovalevsky, was a 1988 finalist for the Nicholl Fellowship in Screenwriting, administered by the Academy of Motion Picture Arts and Sciences.

From the mid-1980s to the mid-1990s Acker free-lanced as a writer/producer for NBC, ABC, Lifetime Television, National Geographic, and Disney Channel. During these years, she also focused on poetry which she began writing at age 13. Her first volume, Surviving Desire, was released by Garden Street Press in 1994. In 1999, Red Hen Press of California released Acker's second volume, Waiting for the Beloved. In 2010, Red Hen put out Acker's, Some Help From the Dead. Acker's poetry has appeared in numerous journals including, The Sun, Ploughshares, The American Voice, Southwest Review, South Dakota Review, Antioch Review, Poetry Salzburg Review, and Poetry Kanto among others. She has received The Chester H. Jones Foundation Award for Poetry and The Carl Sandburg Centennial Award.

== 2000s ==
In 2012, Acker vastly updated and expanded her 1990 Reel Women work now used in Universities worldwide, into a two volume series, Reel Women: The First Hundred Years, Volume One (Foreword by Judith Crist), and Volume Two (Foreword by Jeanine Basinger). Both volumes include an Afterword by Marc Wanamaker. All photos included in Acker's Reel Women films and books are from Wanamaker's famed Bison Archives.

In 2014, culled from the rich interviews gathered for The Reel Women Video Archives, Acker directed, co-wrote, and edited a three part feature film, Reel Herstory: The Real Story of Reel Women, hosted by Jodie Foster, and produced by Sam Pollard, and Robert Dassanowsky.

Acker's writing has appeared in Ms. Magazine, Calyx, The Lesbian Review of Books and Sojourner. Her work is also anthologized in Notable American Women by Susan Ware. She serves on the editorial board of Poetry Salzburg Review, published at the University of Salzburg, Austria. Acker has traveled as a film herstory lecturer to universities and film festivals nationwide. She has appeared as a herstory film scholar on The Ron Reagan Show, The Joe Franklin Show, E Mysteries and Scandals (speaking about film pioneer, Dorothy Arzner). Reel Women was also the focus of a three part series on National Public Radio. In 2015, Acker appeared in The Women Who Run Hollywood, a feature documentary directed by the prolific French filmmakers, Clara Kuperberg and Julia Kuperberg of Wichita Films, Paris.
