= Rex Gibson =

20th/21st-century English academic

Rex Gibson (29 October 1932, Bristol – 1 May 2005, Cambridge) was an English academic writing on the theatre. He is best known for his creation and editing of the Cambridge School Shakespeare series, for which he was given the first Sam Wanamaker Award in 1994.

== Life ==
He attended Bristol University, graduating in commerce in 1953 before serving his National Service as a lieutenant in the Dorset Regiment. He then returned to Bristol to take his Certificate of Education (at Redland College) in 1958 and by 1963 was teaching at a school in Mangotsfield, south Gloucestershire. He married another teacher, Margaret Powell, in 1963 and continued to study and gain academic qualifications, ending up in a 1973 PhD from London University (his thesis was under the title "A Study of the Professional Socialisation of Student Teachers in a College of Education"). Also in 1973 he was appointed to join the staff of Cambridge University.

He taught Shakespeare from Key Stage 3 to university in the UK, as well as providing several Shakespeare courses in Germany and the United States of America and publishing over 100 reviews and articles on Shakespeare and teaching Shakespeare. He acted as Director of the Shakespeare and Schools Project and as lecturer in education in the University of Cambridge Faculty of Education.

== Works ==
- Teaching Shakespeare (Cambridge University Press), Highly Commended by the committee of the English-Speaking Union Duke of Edinburgh Prize.
- Shakespeare's Language (Cambridge University Press)
- Stepping into Shakespeare (Cambridge University Press)
- Discovering Shakespeare's Language (Cambridge University Press)
