= American Shakespeare Center =

Regional theatre company located in Staunton, Virginia, focusing on Shakespeare

Coordinates: 38°8′58.1″N 79°4′13.8″W

- Formation: September 1988
- Type: Theatre group
- Purpose: Shakespeare and other classics, contemporary plays, new plays
- Location(s): The Blackfriars Playhouse 10 S. Market Street Staunton, VA 24401
- Website: americanshakespearecenter.com

The American Shakespeare Center (ASC) is a regional theatre company located in Staunton, Virginia, that focuses on the plays of William Shakespeare; his contemporaries Ben Jonson, Beaumont and Fletcher, Christopher Marlowe; and works related to Shakespeare, like James Goldman's The Lion in Winter and Bob Carlton's Return to the Forbidden Planet.

The ASC is notable for its theatre, the Blackfriars Playhouse, the world's first recreation of the original indoor Blackfriars Theatre in London that was demolished in 1655. As a theater company, the ASC produces 8-9 shows per year with a repertory company at its Blackfriars Playhouse. Prior to the COVID-19 pandemic, the ASC also had a touring company that performed both at the Blackfriars and at other locations around the country. The ASC also provides a year-round laboratory for students and scholars through education programming in Staunton and on the road.

== History ==
=== Shenandoah Shakespeare EXPRESS ===
The American Shakespeare Center was founded as the Shenandoah Shakespeare EXPRESS in 1988 by Dr. Ralph Alan Cohen and Jim Warren. The first show performed by the newly organized company was Richard III, where actors who made up the locally travelling ensemble troupe came from James Madison University's current students and graduates, and the performance was two hours long.

In 1990, the company started performing multiple shows in rotating repertory with a season of A Midsummer Night's Dream and Julius Caesar. Shenandoah Shakespeare Express grew quickly during its first five years, moving from a single touring show in Virginia in 1988 to a three-show tour in 1992 that included the Folger Shakespeare Library in Washington, D.C., and an overseas leg in London and Edinburgh. Three years later, the company toured the U.S., Canada, France, Germany, and Scotland as well as starting to build the Education arm of the company with a six-week National Endowment for the Humanities institute.

In 1997, the Shenandoah Shakespeare Express introduced the Young Company Theatre Camp, a three-week intensive summer program for high school students. It is now known as the ASC Theatre Camp.

=== Shenandoah Shakespeare ===
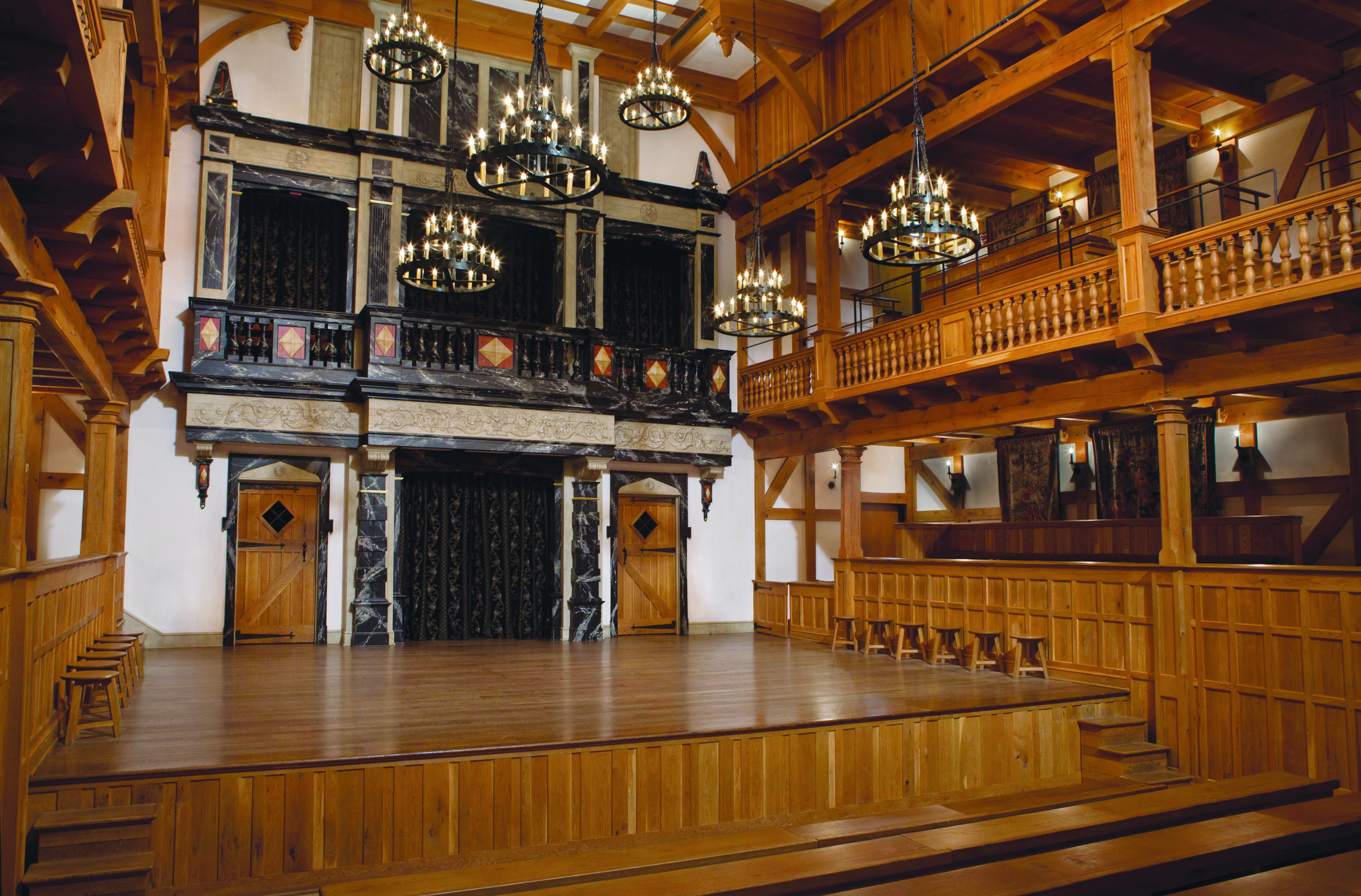
The Blackfriars Playhouse, interior

Shenandoah Shakespeare Express changed its name to Shenandoah Shakespeare in 1999 and moved to Staunton, Virginia.

In September 2001, the Blackfriars Playhouse—the world's first re-creation of Shakespeare's indoor theatre—opened in Staunton, Virginia. ASC Education hosted its first Blackfriars Conference that year.

In 2014, the Sam Wanamaker Playhouse was opened in London. Though not intended as a recreation of the Blackfriars Theatre, it shares many similarities with the ASC's playhouse.

=== American Shakespeare Center ===
In 2005, Shenandoah Shakespeare changed its name to the American Shakespeare Center to reflect its focus on being a center for performance and research. Also in 2005, the first Actors' Renaissance Season debuted. The Actors' Renaissance Season uses Shakespeare's rehearsal conditions (self-directed, self-designed, short rehearsal period) as well as his staging conditions to delve deeper into the plays. The Actors' Renaissance Season is also an opportunity to explore rarer titles of the early modern period.

In 2005, the Bob Carlton musical, Return to the Forbidden Planet, which was loosely based on Shakespeare's The Tempest and the science-fiction classic movie from the late 1950s, Forbidden Planet, was produced by the touring company, then called the Blackfriars Stage Company. The performances incorporated acoustic music, a piano, and a three-sided thrust stage, all of which were selected to maximize audience engagement.

The American Shakespeare Center celebrated its 25th anniversary in 2013.

Due to the COVID-19 Pandemic, the theatre remodeled their structure of administration and producing seasons. The theatre co-implemented a distributed leadership model in 2022. A fairly new concept across the theatrical field, a managing group of department heads that represent diverse perspectives, needs, and expertise that make major decisions for the company together through consensus. The artistic seasons have switched from 16 different titles in 5 distinct seasons, 52 weeks a year, to 8 titles in 4 seasons throughout the year. The company still maintains its Actors Renaissance Season, now in the fall.

In 2023 the American Shakespeare Center celebrated the 35th anniversary of the company. In honor of the 400th anniversary of the first printing of Shakespeare's works all five of the Shakespeare plays in ASC's 2023 artistic year were published in the First Folio, including four which had never been published before. 2023 will also include Eurydice by Sarah Ruhl, The Complete Works of William Shakespeare (Abridged) [Revised] (Again) by the Reduced Shakespeare Company, and A Christmas Carol by Charles Dickens.

January 2024 the ASC announced veteran actor and director Vanessa Morosco would be joining the company as the new executive director. Chair of the board of trustees, Kim West said "Vanessa embodies the energy, hope and joy of our mission to illuminate the plays of Shakespeare and his contemporaries, both classical and modern. Her leadership as executive director will help to ensure that the lights in our beautiful theater continue to burn brightly." Morosco, when speaking of the theater states, "As the American Shakespeare Center, we share light, share ideas, share joy, and share community." The ASC's 2024 season included Shakespeare's Julius Caesar, A Midsummer Night's Dream, Macbeth, and The Merry Wives of Windsor. Additional titles included a new adaptation of Pride and Prejudice by playwright Emma Whipday, The Complete Works of William Shakespeare (Abridged) [Revised] (Again) by the Reduced Shakespeare Company, Dracula: A Comedy of Terrors by Gordon Greenberg and Steve Rosen. The company will perform A Christmas Carol by Charles Dickens in December to close out their performing year.

=== Shakespeare's New Contemporaries (SNC) ===
In April 2017, the American Shakespeare Center launched an international playwrighting competition to develop a canon of new plays that are inspired by and in conversation with the work of William Shakespeare. Each new play will be performed in rotating repertory with the Shakespeare play it corresponds with. Each round names the Shakespeare plays to serve as "jumping off points" for playwrights.

Plays

- Round 1: Anne Page Hates Fun by Amy E. Witting (Performed February 7 – April 14, 2018) – In conversation with The Merry Wives of Windsor
- Round 1: 16 Winters or the Bear's Tale by Mary Elizabeth Hamilton (Performed May 1 – June 8, 2019) – In conversation with The Winter's Tale
- Round 2: Keene by Anchuli Felicia King – In conversation with Othello
- Round 2: The Defamation of Cicely Lee by Emma Whipday – In conversation with Cymbeline
- Round 3: Thrive, or What You Will by L M Feldman – In conversation with Twelfth Night

As of Fall 2022, new cycles of the SNC Initiative are currently on hold as they work through titles paused by the COVID-19 pandemic.

== Blackfriars Playhouse ==
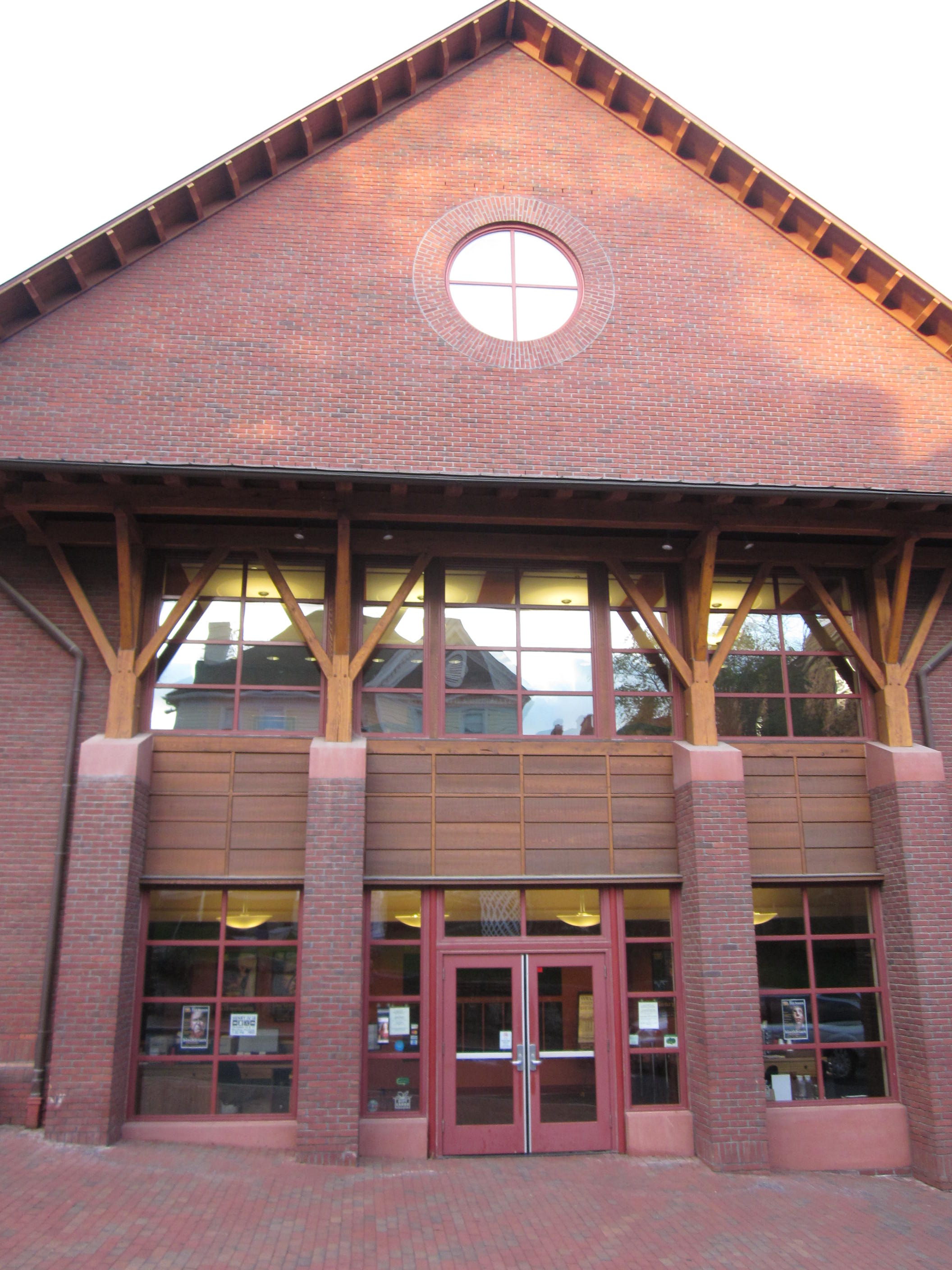
The Blackfriars Playhouse, exterior

In Staunton, the ASC constructed the Blackfriars Playhouse, the first modern re-creation of Shakespeare's original indoor theatre, the Blackfriars Theatre. As no reliable plans of that theatre are known, architect Tom McLaughlin based the design on plans for other 17th-century theatres, his own trips to England to view surviving halls of the period, Shakespeare's stage directions and other research and consultation. The chosen dimensions of 50 feet (15 m) by 70 feet (21 m) were derived from the research of theatre historian Irwin Smith.

Construction began on the playhouse in early 2000, as part of a three-building construction plan that would also include a re-creation of the 1614 Globe Theatre and a Center for Research and Education. The theater was built with timber sourced by Dreaming Creek.

The playhouse was completed at a cost of $3.7 million, and opened in September 2001. Built inside a brick shell, it is a wood-pegged, post-and-beam structure, made of Virginia oak, with a hammerbeam roof. The seating capacity is 300. Raked benches in a pit and two levels of galleries place the audience close to the actors, and even seating on the stage is possible. Unlike the original Blackfriars, the theatre has no painted decorations except at the back of the stage, and no windows in the auditorium. Electrical lighting reflected off the ceiling is used to simulate daylight, and lights simulating candles are mounted on sconces, and on wrought-iron chandeliers.

In 2012, the Blackfriars Playhouse appeared in BBC's documentary Shakespeare Uncovered, which aired in the U.S. in early 2013.

== Shakespeare's staging conditions ==
The American Shakespeare Center gives its audiences some of the same experiences that an Elizabethan playgoer would have enjoyed by following the basic principles of Renaissance theatrical production - including Universal Lighting (audience and actors share the same pool of light), Doubling (one actor playing multiple roles in a show), cross-gender casting (men playing female characters and vice versa), and minimal sets.

== Productions ==
For resident theatre companies, according to Zelda Fichandler, "repertory is destiny" — a theatre company acquires its audience by the productions it presents. Most of the productions at the American Shakespeare Center's are from Shakespeare's canon; however, each year several productions are works by his contemporary playwrights or more modern plays that relate directly to the Shakespeare canon or work well using Shakespeare's staging conditions.

== Educational programming ==
ASC Education offers workshops, performances, staged readings, lectures, a biennial international conference, teacher training, archival materials for scholarly research, and summer programs for teens and adults.

== Mary Baldwin University ==
The ASC is in partnership with Mary Baldwin University in the one-of-a-kind MLitt/MFA Shakespeare and Performance graduate program for actors, directors, teachers, and dramaturgs. The program's graduates have gone on to doctoral work, tenure-track faculty positions, and professional theatre careers.

== Organization ==
Administration

- Ralph Alan Cohen, co-founder and director of mission, Shakespeare scholar
- Vanessa Morosco, executive director, January 2024 – present

Advisory board

- Miles Anderson, an English actor
- David Bevington, Shakespeare scholar
- Ronald E. Carrier, fourth president and current chancellor of James Madison University
- Gordon Davies, former director of the State Council of Higher Education for Virginia
- Judi Dench, an English actress
- Lesley Duff
- Michael Goldman
- Phoef Sutton, Emmy Award-winning American television writer and producer of feature films
- Gary Taylor, professor of English at Florida State University
- Zoë Wanamaker, an American-born, English actress and honorary president of Shakespeare's Globe in London
- George Walton Williams
- Jerry Zaks, Tony Award-winning American Broadway theatre and television actor and director

== Honors ==
In 2008, Virginia governor Tim Kaine honored American Shakespeare Center co-founders Jim Warren and Ralph Alan Cohen with the Governor's Awards for the Arts.

On September 12, 2013, the Staunton, Virginia, City Council passed a resolution honoring the 25th anniversary of the American Shakespeare Center, acknowledging its growth from a touring troupe performing Richard III fourteen times in rural Virginia into an international Shakespeare center that has:

- Performed in 47 U.S. states and five other countries
- Built the world's first re-creation of Shakespeare's indoor theatre
- Become the hub of scholarship on early modern performance at the biennial Blackfriars Conference

Shakespeare's Globe awarded American Shakespeare Center co-founder Ralph Alan Cohen with the Sam Wanamaker Award in June 2014.

In 2015, The Folger Shakespeare Library awarded the American Shakespeare Center with its Shakespeare Steward Award for its contributions in Shakespeare education.

In 2016, the Arts Council of the Shenandoah Valley awarded the American Shakespeare Center its Circle of Excellence Award.

In 2017, the Virginia Commission for the Arts named the American Shakespeare Center one of its "50 for 50 Arts Inspirations" in the category of Bedrock Institutions.

== See also ==
- Blackfriars Theatre
- Globe Theatre
- Regional theater in the United States
- Shakespeare in performance
