= Cicely Berry =

British theatre director and vocal coach

Cicely Berry CBE
- Born: 17 May 1926; Berkhamsted, England
- Died: 15 October 2018 (aged 92)
- Other name: Cis
- Education: Central School of Speech and Drama
- Occupations: Theatre director, vocal coach
- Spouse: Harry Moore
- Children: 3

Cicely Frances Berry CBE (17 May 1926 – 15 October 2018) was a British theatre director and vocal coach. In 2000 she was awarded the Sam Wanamaker Prize for pioneering work in theatre.

== Early life and education ==
Berry was born in Berkhamsted to Cecil and Frances Berry. She was one of five children. She trained under Elsie Fogerty at the Royal Central School of Speech and Drama (Central). One of her earliest teachers was Barbara Bunch. While teaching at Central, she met and married an American acting student, Harry Moore. They had three children.

== Career ==
In 1969 Berry was appointed by Trevor Nunn as voice director for the Royal Shakespeare Company. She held the position until 2014. She also worked as a voice and text coach at the Central School of Speech and Drama. She conducted workshops in the UK and overseas, including Korea, Russia, Australia, China and India. Her work also extended to prisons, where she would use Shakespeare as a vessel to find confidence in speaking and response to imagery.

Her work in film included dialogue coach on The Last Emperor (1987) and Stealing Beauty (1996); and as voice specialist on Julie Taymor's 1999 film Titus. She worked with Maggie Smith, Ann Bancroft, John Cleese, Peter Finch, Sean Connery, Richard Chamberlain and Susan Hampshire.

== Books and DVDs ==
- Voice and the Actor (1973) ISBN 978-0099555476
- Voice in Modern Theatre (1991) ISBN 978-0415048941 with Jacqueline Martin
- Your Voice and How to Use It (2000) ISBN 978-0863698262
- The Actor and the Text (2000) ISBN 978-0863697050
- Text in Action (2001) ISBN 978-0753505410
- The Working Shakespeare Collection: A Workbook for Teachers (2004) ISBN 978-1557836434
- From Word to Play: A Textual Handbook for Directors and Actors (2007) ISBN 978-1840026016
- The Working Shakespeare Library 5-DVD collection with Adrian Wade

== Directing ==
- Hamlet for the National Theatre Education Unit
- King Lear for The Other Place and The Royal Shakespeare Company

== Honours ==
- 1985 – Received OBE
- 1992 – Nominated for special award by Arts Council England for her ‘response to the challenges posed by a technologically diverse and increasingly multi-cultural environment.’
- 1997 – Doctor Honoris, National Academy for Theatre and Film Arts, Sofia, Bulgaria
- 1999 – Honorary Doctorate of Literature from University of Birmingham
- 2000 – The Sam Wanamaker Prize for pioneering work in theatre
- 2001 – Honorary Doctorate of Literature from the Open University
- 2009 – Berry was appointed Commander of the Order of the British Empire (CBE) in the 2009 Birthday Honours.

== Bibliography ==
- Barnett, Laura, Cicely Berry, Voice Coach to the Stars. Guardian
- Berry, Cicely, documentary. Where Words Prevail. Dir. Steven Budlong and Salvatore Rasa. Sorjourner Media, L.L.C., 2005.
- Berry, Cicely, Kristin Linklater, and Patsy Rodenburg. "Shakespeare, Feminism, and Voice: Responses to Sarah Werner." New Theatre Quarterly XIII.49 (1997): 48-52.
- Berry, Cicely. Voice and the Actor. New York: Hungry Minds, Inc., 1973.
