= Thelma Holt =

British actress, theatre producer (born 1932)

Thelma Holt CBE
- Born: 4 January 1932 (age 94); Lancashire, England, UK
- Occupations: Producer, retired actress
- Spouse(s): Patrick Graucob (divorced, 1968) David Pressman (divorced, 1970) Patrick Graucob (remarried, 2011)

Thelma Holt CBE (born 4 January 1932) is a British West End producer and former actress. She is described as "one of the most influential" producers in the UK industry, and has been honored with both an Order of the British Empire (UK) and an Order of the Rising Sun (Japan, 2004).

In 2018, she received the Sam Wanamaker Award from Shakespeare's Globe to celebrate work "which has increased the understanding and enjoyment of Shakespeare." She was known as a close collaborator and champion of Japanese director Yukio Ninagawa from 1987 until his death in 2016.

== Early life ==
Holt was born in Barton-on-Irwell, Lancashire, to English electrical engineer Peter David Holt and Irish-born Eleanor Finnagh Doyle. She grew up Catholic. Her father was killed in an air raid during World War II, leaving her mother to raise her and her older sister Elizabeth. After attending St Anne's School for Girls, she trained at the Royal Academy of Dramatic Art (RADA) from 1952 to 1954.

== Career ==
Graduating from RADA, Holt enjoyed a fairly successful career as an actress and understudied her friend Vanessa Redgrave. She then founded the Open Space Theatre on Tottenham Court Road in partnership with Charles Marowitz, a theatre which quickly became the forerunner of the London Fringe. In 1977, she joined The Round House in Chalk Farm as Artistic and executive director, instigating a policy of bringing the best of regional theatre to London including the Citizens Theatre (Glasgow), Royal Exchange Theatre Company (Manchester), and Stephen Joseph Theatre Company (Scarborough).

From 1977 to 1983, Holt was artistic director at the Roundhouse. In 1983, The Roundhouse closed and Thelma Holt joined the Theatre of Comedy as executive producer, where she produced Loot by Joe Orton, directed by Jonathan Lynn and starring Leonard Rossiter. She is also an Associate Producer at the Royal Shakespeare Company and a patron of the Oxford University Dramatic Society (OUDS).

In 1985, Holt joined the National Theatre as head of Touring and Commercial Exploitation. She was responsible for the following NT West End transfers: A Chorus of Disapproval, The Petition, Brighton Beach Memoirs, Three Men on a Horse and A View from the Bridge. She also oversaw major tours of National Theatre productions abroad, with performances in Paris, Vienna, Zurich, North America, Moscow, Tbilisi, Tokyo, and Epidavros.

Holt produced International 87, a series of four visits to the National Theatre by international theatre companies: The Hairy Ape directed by Peter Stein for the Schaubühne; Miss Julie and Hamlet directed by Ingmar Bergman for the Royal Dramatic Theatre, Stockholm; Macbeth and Medea directed by Yukio Ninagawa for the Ninagawa Theatre Company, and Tomorrow was War by the Mayakovsky Theatre Company from Moscow. Holt received the Olivier/Observer Award for Outstanding Achievement in the Theatre as well as an award from Drama Magazine. In 1998, she co-produced an adaptation of The Fairy-Queen directed by Adrian Noble for the Aix-en-Provence Festival.

She then produced International 89, this time festuring Tango Varsoviano by Teatro del Sur (Buenos Aires), Grapes of Wrath by the Steppenwolf Theatre Company (Chicago), Uncle Vanya from the Moscow Art Theatre and Suicide for Love by the Ninagawa Theatre Company.

Holt's tenure at the National was only the beginning of her long relationship with Japanese director Yukio Ninagawa. Over three decades, she brought 17 of Ninagawa's productions to the UK, including adaptations of Shakespeare, Euripides, Ibsen, Shimizu and Murakami. They continued to work together until Ninagawa's death in 2016.

For the newly formed Peter Hall Company, Holt was Executive Producer for: Orpheus Descending by Tennessee Williams (cast included Vanessa Redgrave), presented at the Theatre Royal, Haymarket; The Merchant of Venice by William Shakespeare (cast included Dustin Hoffman) presented at the Phoenix Theatre, London and in New York; Hamlet (cast included Alan Rickman), presented at Riverside Studios and on tour; Much Ado About Nothing (cast included Janet McTeer, Mark Rylance), presented at the Queen's Theatre and awarded a Sir Tyrone Guthrie Award; and The Wild Duck by Henrik Ibsen (cast included Alex Jennings, David Threlfall, Nichola McAuliffe) presented at the Phoenix Theatre, London.

In 1990, Holt was executive producer for Triumph Proscenium's production of Pirandello's Henry IV starring Richard Harris, which was presented at Wyndham's Theatre, London. Also in 1990, she presented two visiting productions at the National Theatre: Hamlet by the Bulandra Theatre Company from Bucharest; and The Kingdom of Desire, based on Macbeth, by the Contemporary Legend Theatre from Taiwan.

== Thelma Holt Limited ==
=== 1990–1999 ===
1990

- Three Sisters by Anton Chekhov in a new version by Nikolas Simmonds, directed by Robert Sturua, cast included: Vanessa Redgrave, Lynn Redgrave and Jemma Redgrave, presented at the Queen's Theatre
- Tango at the End of Winter by Shimizu in a version by Peter Barnes, directed by Yukio Ninagawa, cast included Alan Rickman, presented at the Piccadilly Theatre

1991

- Electra by Sophocles, RSC production directed by Deborah Warner, cast included Fiona Shaw in the title role, presented at Riverside Studios follows by a tour to Bobigny (France), Bradford (Transport Museum), Derry (Sports Centre) and Glasgow (Tramway)

1992

- Hamlet by William Shakespeare, directed by Robert Sturua, cast included Alan Rickman in the title role, presented at Riverside Studios and on tour in the UK
- Les Atride directed by Ariane Mnouchkine, production from Le Theatre du Soleil, Paris, presented at Robin Mills, Bradford as part of the European Arts Festival
- Le baruffe chiozzotte directed by Giorgio Strehler, production from Piccolo Theatre, Milan, presented at the Royal National Theatre
- Six Characters in Search of an Author by Pirandello, directed by Franco Zeffirelli, presented at the Royal National Theatre
- The Tempest by William Shakespeare, directed by Yukio Ninagawa, Ninagawa Company presented at the Barbican Theatre, London

1993

- Medea by Euripides, directed by Yukio Ninagawa, Ninagawa Company in association with Point Tokyo Co. Ltd., presented in Zurich, Switzerland
- Much Ado About Nothing by William Shakespeare, directed by Matthew Warchus, cast included Mark Rylance and Janet McTeer, presented at the Queen's Theatre. Production awarded the Sir Tyrone Guthrie Award for Best Production at the Shakespeare Globe Classic Awards.

1994

- Peer Gynt by Henrik Ibsen in a version by Frank McGuinness, directed by Yukio Ninagawa, cast included Michael Sheen in the title role. World Tour including premiere performances at the Winter Olympics in Norway.
- The Clandestine Marriage by George Colman & Garrick, directed by Nigel Hawthorne, cast included Nigel Hawthorne, presented at the Queen's Theatre, London.

1995

- The Seagull by Anton Chekhov, directed by Robert Sturua, cast included Deborah Findlay, Michael Sheen and Kate Beckinsale. Regional UK Tour.
- A Midsummer Night's Dream by William Shakespeare, directed by Yukio Ninagawa. Ninagawa Company presented at Plymouth Pavilions and at Newcastle Playhouse.
- Anthony and Cleopatra by William Shakespeare, directed by Vanessa Redgrave, cast included Vanessa Redgrave, David Harewood. Riverside Studios and Regional UK tour.
- The Glass Menagerie by Tennessee Williams, directed by Sam Mendes, cast included Zoë Wanamaker. Donmar Warehouse production transfer to Comedy Theatre.

1996

- Observe the Sons of Ulster Marching Towards the Somme by Frank McGuinness, directed by Patrick Mason. Abbey Theatre, Dublin production presented at the Barbican Theatre and on tour
- A Midsummer Night's Dream by William Shakespeare, directed by Yukio Ninagawa. Return of Ninagawa Company production to Mermaid Theatre, London
- A Doll's House by Henrik Ibsen in a version by Frank McGuinness, directed by Anthony Page, presented as a regional UK tour followed by a season at the Playhouse Theatre, London and subsequently in association with Bill Kenwright at the Belasco Theatre, New York. Cast included Janet McTeer, Owen Teale. Tony Award for Best Actress in a Play, (Janet McTeer). Tony Award for Best Supporting Actor (Owen Teale). Tony Award for Best Direction of a Play (Anthony Page). Tony Award for Best Revival of a Play (Thelma Holt/Bill Kenwright)

1997

- The Maids by Jean Genet, directed by John Crowley. Regional tour of Donmar Warehouse production
- Les Fausses Confidences by Marivaux. Comédie-Française production presented at the Royal National Theatre
- Oh Les Beaux Jours by Samuel Beckett directed by Peter Brook. Presented at Riverside Studios
- Shintoku Maru, directed by Yukio Ninagawa, cast included Tatsuya Fujiwara. Ninagawa Company at the Barbican Theatre

1998

- The Relapse by John Vanburgh, directed and designed by Philip Prowse. Citizens Theatre, Glasgow and UK tour
- Hamlet by William Shakespeare directed by Yukio Ninagawa. Hiroyuki Sanada in the title. Presented at the Barbican Theatre as part of BITE season

1999

- Cleo, Camping, Emmanuelle and Dick by Terry Johnson, directed by Terry Johnson. Royal National Theatre production presented on UK tour
- Macbeth by William Shakespeare, directed by John Crowley, cast included Rufus Sewell in the title role. Presented at the Queen's Theatre
- King Lear by William Shakespeare directed by Yukio Ninagawa, cast included Nigel Hawthorne in the title role. Royal Shakespeare Company production in association with HoriPro Inc. presented in Tokyo, London and in Stratford-upon-Avon

=== 2000–2015 ===
2000

- Miss Julie by August Strindberg in a version by Frank McGuinness directed by Michael Boyd. Cast included Christopher Eccleston, Aisling O'Sullivan, Maxine Peake. Presented at the Theatre Royal Haymarket.

2001

- Semi-Monde by Noël Coward directed and designed by Philip Prowse. London premiere production presented at the Lyric Theatre, London.
- Sotoba Komachi and Yoroboshi by Yukio Mishima directed by Yukio Ninagawa cast included Tatsuya Fujiwara. Ninagawa Company presented at the Barbican Theatre, London as part of BITE: 01.

2002

- Via Dolorosa by David Hare directed by Stephen Daldry. David Hare in award-winning one-man show at the Duchess Theatre in association with Bill Kenwright.
- The Tempest by William Shakespeare directed by Patrick Mason cast included Richard Briers. UK tour in association with Theatre Royal, Plymouth (Stage 1 of Arts Council Three Year Initiative). The musical score was composed by Tom Foster-Carter.

2002/03

- The Jacobeans – West End presentation at the Gielgud Theatre in association with Bill Kenwright of RSC productions.
- The Island Princess by John Fletcher.
- The Malcontent by John Marston.
- The Roman Actor by Philip Massinger.
- Eastward Ho! by Ben Jonson, John Marston, George Chapman.
- Edward III by William Shakespeare. Olivier Special Award to the Acting Ensemble 2003.

2003

- Pericles by William Shakespeare directed by Yukio Ninagawa. Ninagawa Company at the Royal National Theatre.
- Ghosts by Henrik Ibsen directed by Ingmar Bergman. Royal Dramaten Theatre, Stockholm production presented at the Barbican Theatre as part of BITE:03.
- Hamlet by William Shakespeare directed by Jonathan Kent. HoriPro Inc. production presented at Sadler's Wells Theatre, London.
- The Taming of The Shrew by William Shakespeare directed by Mark Rosenblatt, cast included Nichola McAuliffe and Ross Kemp. UK tour in association with Theatre Royal Plymouth (Stage 2 of Arts Council Three Year Initiative).

2004

- The Taming of the Shrew by William Shakespeare in repertoire with The Tamer Tamed by John Fletcher directed by Gregory Doran RSC productions presented in association with Bill Kenwright at the Queen's Theatre, London.
- All's Well That Ends Well by William Shakespeare directed by Gregory Doran cast included Judi Dench. RSC production presented in association with Bill Kenwright at the Gielgud Theatre, London.
- Othello by William Shakespeare directed by Gregory Doran cast included Antony Sher. RSC production presented on tour in Japan in association with HoriPro Inc.
- We Happy Few by Imogen Stubbs directed by Trevor Nunn cast included Juliet Stevenson. Presented in association with Bill Kenwright at the Gielgud Theatre, London.
- Hamlet by William Shakespeare directed by Yukio Ninagawa cast included Michael Maloney in the title role. UK tour and presentation at Barbican Theatre as part of BITE: 04 in association with Theatre Royal Plymouth (Stage 3 of Arts Council Three Year Initiative).

2005

- Man and Boy by Terence Rattigan directed by Maria Aitken with David Suchet in the leading role. Yvonne Arnaud Theatre, Guildford.
- Primo by Primo Levi adapted by Antony Sher and directed by Richard Wilson. Solo performance by Antony Sher National Theatre production presented in association with Bill Kenwright at the Music Box, New York. Outer Critics' Circle Award for Solo Performance.
- Twelfth Night by William Shakespeare directed by Patrick Mason with Matthew Kelly as Malvolio. UK tour in association with Theatre Royal Plymouth.
- A Midsummer Night's Dream by William Shakespeare directed by Gregory Doran. Tour to Tokyo Metropolitan Art Space, Japan. RSC production presented in association with HoriPro Inc. and Metropolitan Art Space, Tokyo.

2006

- The Crucible by Arthur Miller directed by Dominic Cooke with Iain Glen in the principal role. RSC production presented in association with Bill Kenwright at the Gielgud Theatre.
- Hay Fever by Noël Coward directed by Peter Hall with Judi Dench and Peter Bowles. Produced in association with Bill Kenwright at Theatre Royal Haymarket, London.
- Breakfast With Mugabe by Fraser Grace directed by Antony Sher (debut as director) at Duchess Theatre. RSC production presented in association with Nica Burns.
- Titus Andronicus by William Shakespeare directed by Yukio Ninagawa. Presented in association with HoriPro Inc. Royal Shakespeare Theatre and Theatre Royal Plymouth. Part of RSC Complete Works Festival.
- The Canterbury Tales by Geoffrey Chaucer, a new adaptation in two parts by Mike Poulton. An RSC production of an RSC Commission directed by Gregory Doran, Rebecca Gatward & Jonathan Munby. Presented at the Gielgud Theatre in association with Bill Kenwright.

2007

- Coriolanus by William Shakespeare directed by Yukio Ninagawa. Presented in association with HoriPro Inc. at the Barbican Theatre as part of BITE 2007.
- Kean by Jean-Paul Sartre. Antony Sher in the title role directed by Adrian Noble. Presented in association with Anthony Field and John C. Causebrook at the Apollo Theatre.
- The Giant by Antony Sher directed by Gregory Doran. In association with Hampstead Theatre and by arrangement with the RSC at the Hampstead Theatre.

2009

- Measure for Measure by William Shakespeare directed by Jamie Glover with Alistair McGowan and Jason Merrells. UK tour in association with Theatre Royal Plymouth.
- Twelfth Night after William Shakespeare directed by Yukio Ninagawa. Presented in association with Shochiku Grand Kabuki at the Barbican Theatre as part of bite 2009.
- The English Samurai by Mike Poulton & Shoichiro Kawai directed by Gregory Doran. In association with HoriPro Inc. at the Galaxy Theatre, Tokyo.

2010

- Ghosts by Henrik Ibsen in a version by Frank McGuinness directed by Iain Glen at the Duchess Theatre.
- Bedroom Farce by Alan Ayckbourn directed by Peter Hall. Presented in association with Bill Kenwright at the Duke of York's Theatre.
- Musashi by Inoue Hisashi directed by Yukio Ninagawa. In association with HoriPro Inc. at the Barbican Theatre as part of bite 2010.

2011

- Ruby Wax: Losing It in a co-production with the Menier Chocolate Factory, at the Duchess Theatre.

2012

- Cymbeline by William Shakespeare, directed by Yukio Ninagawa. Produced in association with HoriPro Inc. at the Barbican Theatre as part of bite 2012.
- Written on the Heart by David Edgar, directed by Gregory Doran. RSC production presented in association with Bill Kenwright and Nica Burns at the Duchess Theatre.
- Volcano by Noël Coward, produced in association with Bill Kenwright. UK tour and at the Vaudeville Theatre.
- All That Fall by Samuel Beckett, directed by Trevor Nunn. Jermyn Street Theatre production presented in association with Richard Darbourne at the Arts Theatre.

2013

- Anjin – The Shogun & The English Samurai by Mike Poulton and Sho Kawai, directed by Gregory Doran. Produced in association with HoriPro Inc. in Japan and at Sadlers Wells Theatre.

2014

- Forbidden Broadway transfer to Vaudeville Theatre of Menier Chocolate Factory production for limited season.

2015

- Hamlet by William Shakespeare and Kafka on the Shore based on the work of Haruki Murakami adapted by Frank Galati, directed by Yukio Ninagawa, presented at Barbican Theatre in association with HoriPro Inc.

2017

- Macbeth by William Shakespeare, original production by Yukio Ninagawa presented at the Barbican Theatre in association with Horipro Inc.

2018

- Imperium by Robert Harris, adapted by Mike Poulton, directed by Gregory Doran, Royal Shakespeare Company production with Playful Productions Ltd. at the Gielgud Theatre
- Don Quixote by Miguel de Cervantes adapted by James Fenton, directed by Angus Jackson, Royal Shakespeare Company production with Nimax Theatres at the Garrick Theatre

== Honours and awards ==
- Olivier/Observer Award – Outstanding Achievement (1987)
- Shakespeare Globe Classic Awards – Tyrone Guthrie Award for Best Production (1993) (Much Ado About Nothing)
- Tony Award (with Bill Kenwright) – Best Revival (1996) (A Doll's House)
- CBE – Queen's Birthday Honours List (1994)
- Award for Excellence in International Theatre – British International Theatre Institute (1994)
- Order of the Rising Sun, Gold Rays with Rosette (2004) – presented by Japanese government
- Distinguished Friend of Oxford University (2006)
- Theatrical Management Association's Special Award for Individual Achievement (2006)
- The Sam Wanamaker Award, Shakespeare's Globe (2018)

=== Positions held ===
- Yvonne Arnaud Theatre – Chairman (2002 to 2005) subsequently associate director.
- Arts Council of England – Member of Council and Chairman of Drama Advisory Panel (1994–1998)
- Royal Academy of Dramatic Art – Member of Council and Member of Finance & General Purposes Committee
- Citizens Theatre, Glasgow – Vice-president.
- Almeida Theatre – Director (2001 to 2009)
- Stage One (formerly Theatre Investment Fund) – Director and Chairman of Young Producers' Bursary Panel
- State of Unrest Theatre Company (dissolved 2003) – Patron
- Oxford University – Cameron Mackintosh Professor Contemporary Theatre (1998)
- Oxford University Dramatic Society – Patron.
- Royal Shakespeare Company – Associate Producer (from 2004)

=== Commonwealth honours ===
Commonwealth honours

Country	Date	Appointment	Post-nominal letters
United Kingdom	1994 – Present	Commander of the Order of the British Empire	CBE

=== Foreign honours ===
Foreign honours

Country	Date	Appointment	Post-nominal letters
Japan	2004 – Present	Order of the Rising Sun (Gold Rays with Rosette)	

=== Scholastic ===
Chancellor, visitor, governor, rector and fellowships

Location	Date	School	Position
England	1998 – 1999	University of Oxford	Cameron Mackintosh Professor of Contemporary Theatre
England	2002–Present	Liverpool Institute for Performing Arts	Companion
England	2003–Present	St Catherine's College, Oxford	Emeritus Fellow
England	2018–Present	Royal Academy of Dramatic Art	Honorary Fellow
England		Oxford University Dramatic Society	Patron
England		Middlesex University	Member of Court

=== Honorary Degrees ===
Honorary degrees

Location	Date	School	Degree	Gave Commencement Address
England	1998	Open University	Master of Arts (MA)	
England	1994	Middlesex University	Doctorate	
England	2003	University of East Anglia	Doctor of Letters (D.Litt.)	
England	2010	University of Plymouth	Doctor of Arts (D.Arts)	
