= Laurie Jacobson =

American author

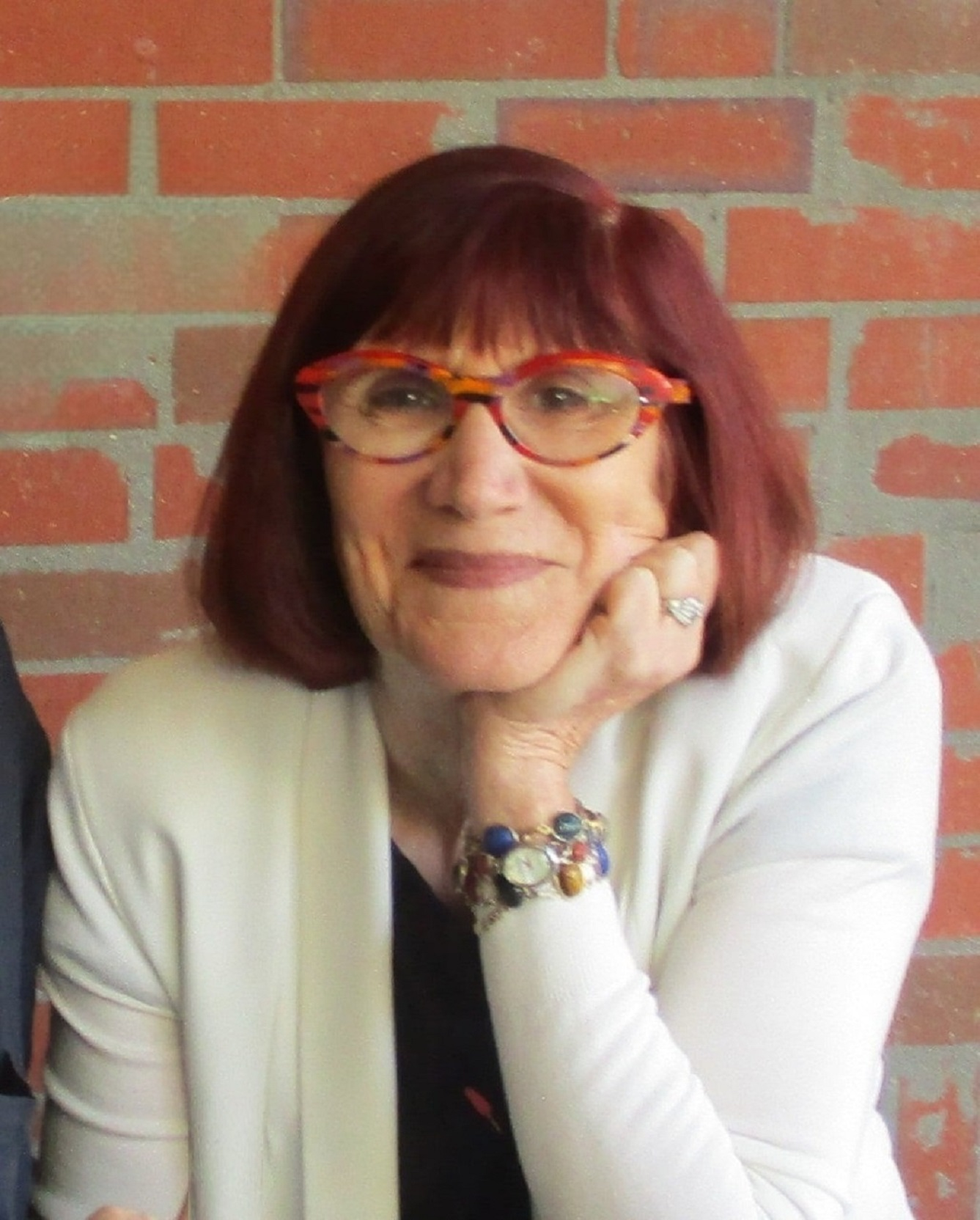
Jacobson at Hotel La Rose in 2025

Laurie Jacobson (born April 22 1953) is an American author of books and articles about entertainment profiles and phenomena. After years with Harvey Lembeck's comedy workshop, where she was inspired by classmates such as Robin Williams, John Larroquette and John Ritter, she gained notoriety as a writer and producer accounting for her own Hollywood research on television.

Born in St. Louis, Jacobson moved to Los Angeles and started working in comedy groups and as a stand-up on her own. She was intrigued by stories on previous performers and began collecting facts and doing interviews about them. In addition to writing, she has also produced documentaries and television specials, among them Mary Tyler Moore: The 20th Anniversary Show, Warner Bros Studio Rededication Party (1990), The Suzanne Summers Show (1994) and The Museum of Television and Radio's Salute to Funny Women on Television. Respected as an authority on Hollywood history, she has appeared on radio and television, including E!’s Mysteries and Scandals, CNN, 20th Century with Mike Wallace, Art Bell's Dark Matter, Entertainment Tonight, A&E, History Channel, Discovery Channel and AMC. In 2008 she co-starred with Shirley Knight in the independent film Not Fade Away. Jacobson resides in Santa Rosa, California where she has taught at American Eagle Studios and Santa Rosa Junior College.

She accounted for her own personal supernatural experiences in a Hollywood Halloween podcast in 2013. Details of Jacobson's background have been covered extensively in online interviews and news reports. Her husband is actor Jon Provost whom she met in 1996.

In 2017, the Southern California Motion Picture Council in Van Nuys gave Jacobson its Lifetime Achievement Award in appreciation of her entertainment-industry contributions.

In recent years, Jacobson has become a profile in TV-associated culinary history and she and her husband have also been involved in animal activism. Through Provost Pets they launched a line of pet products in 2025.

== Bibliography ==
Books by this author are:

- Laurie Jacobson: Hollywood heartbreak : the tragic and mysterious deaths of Hollywood's most remarkable legends, Simon & Schuster, New York 1984 ISBN 067149998X
- Laurie Jacobson & Marc Wanamaker: Hollywood haunted : a ghostly tour of filmland, Angel City Press, Santa Monica, California 1994 ISBN 9781883318314
- Laurie Jacobson & Marc Wanamaker: Hollywood haunted : a ghostly tour of filmland; Updated & revised edition, Angel City Press, Santa Monica, California 1999 ISBN 9781883318123 (reissued Authors' Cut in 2023 by Living Legends Publishing Group ISBN 9798861939157)
- Laurie Jacobson: Dishing Hollywood : the real scoop on Tinseltown's most notorious scandals, Cumberland House, Nashville, Tennessee 2003 ISBN 9781581823707
- Laurie Jacobson & Jon Provost: Timmy's in the well : the Jon Provost story, Cumberland House, Nashville, Tennessee 2007, ISBN 9781581826197 (reissued in 2022 by Living Legends Publishing Group ISBN 9798371477866)
- Laurie Jacobson: TV Dinners : 40 Classic TV Kid Stars Dish Up Favorite Recipes with a Side of Memories, TV Classics Press (MPM), Stockbridge, Massachusetts 2020 ISBN 9781944068912
- Laurie Jacobson: Top of the mountain : the Beatles at Shea Stadium 1965, Backbeat Books/Bloomsbury Publishing, Lanham, Maryland 2022 ISBN 9781493065288
- Laurie Jacobson (foreword): The Heavenly Bills Hotel : My Years at The Beverly Hills Hotel and Beyond by Jacob Truedson Demitz, Southerly Clubs, Stockholm, Sweden 2026 ISBN 9789153501589
