= Gary Taylor (scholar) =

American academic, professor, author and editor

Gary Taylor (born 1953) is an American academic, Robert Lawton Distinguished University Professor of English at Florida State University, author of numerous books and articles, and joint editor of The Oxford Shakespeare, The Oxford Middleton, and "The New Oxford Shakespeare."

== Life ==
The first member of his family to graduate from high school, Taylor won scholarships that led to bachelor's degrees in English and Classics from the University of Kansas (1975) and to a doctorate in English from the University of Cambridge (1988). With Stanley Wells, he worked for eight years as the "enfant terrible" of the Oxford Shakespeare (1978–86), a project that generated much controversy through editorial decisions such as printing two separate texts of King Lear and accepting and publicizing a manuscript attribution to Shakespeare of a poem commonly known as "Shall I die?" (an attribution that has since been almost universally rejected). He has taught at Oxford University, Catholic University of America, Brandeis University (where he was Chair of the English department), and the University of Alabama (where he directed the Hudson Strode Program in Renaissance Studies, 1995–2005). In 2005, he joined the English Department at Florida State University, where he became founder and first director of the interdisciplinary History of Text Technologies program, and served six years as department chair.

Taylor has written extensively on Shakespeare, Middleton, early modern culture, canon formation, race and ethnicity, gender and masculinity. Four of his works are included in the Random House list of the hundred most important books on Shakespeare (more than any other non-British author). He is best known for his work as an editor, textual critic, and editorial theorist, for which he has received fellowships from the Folger Shakespeare Library, the National Endowment for the Humanities, and the John Simon Guggenheim Memorial Foundation. He has also written for Time, The Guardian, and other periodicals, spoken to many theatre audiences, and been often interviewed on radio and television.

Taylor devoted twenty years to The Collected Works of Thomas Middleton, published by Oxford University Press in 2007. With John Lavagnino, he led a team of 75 contributors from 12 countries to produce "the Middleton First Folio," designed to establish Middleton’s status as "our other Shakespeare." Among other works, Taylor and Lavagnino chose to print the entire texts of William Shakespeare's plays Macbeth and Measure for Measure, on the theory that Middleton revised both of these plays after their original composition. They include Shakespeare's Timon of Athens as well, but in this case postulating that it was a collaboration between the two authors. Also included in the volume are such anonymous plays as A Yorkshire Tragedy, The Second Maiden's Tragedy (presented under the title The Lady's Tragedy) and The Revenger's Tragedy, which are generally, though not universally, credited to Middleton by modern scholars.

== Selected works ==
Books

- Gary Taylor and Michael Warren, eds., The Division of the Kingdoms (1983).
- Stanley Wells, Gary Taylor, John Jowett and William Montgomery, William Shakespeare: A Textual Companion (1987).
- Reinventing Shakespeare: A Cultural History from the Restoration to the Present (1989).
- Gary Taylor and John Jowett, Shakespeare Reshaped 1606-1623 (1993).
- Cultural Selection (1996).
- Castration: An Abbreviated History of Western Manhood (2000).
- Buying Whiteness: Race, Culture, and Identity from Columbus to Hip Hop (2005).
- William Shakespeare, Complete Works, eds. Stanley Wells, Gary Taylor, John Jowett and William Montgomery (1986, rev. 2005).
- John Fletcher, The Tamer Tamed, ed. Celia R. Daileader and Gary Taylor (2006).
- Thomas Middleton and Early Modern Textual Culture, gen. eds. Gary Taylor and John Lavagnino (2007).
- The Collected Works of Thomas Middleton, gen. eds. Gary Taylor and John Lavagnino (2007).
