= Ralph Alan Cohen =

American theatre director

Ralph Alan Cohen (born 1945) is an American educator, scholar theatre director, and academic entrepreneur. He is the co-founder and Senior Advisor of the American Shakespeare Center, a theater company located in Staunton, Virginia. In 2001, as Executive Director of the ASC, he was also Project Director for the building of the Blackfriars Playhouse, a recreation of the Blackfriars Theatre, England’s first purpose-built indoor theatre, and home to Shakespeare’s company, the King’s Men until the closing of the theatres in 1642.

Cohen was Gonder Professor of Shakespeare and Performance and founded the Master of Letters and Fine Arts program at Mary Baldwin University. He is the author of ShakesFear and How to Cure It: A Handbook for Teaching Shakespeare.

Cohen’s "ability to negotiate nimbly among three disciplines: scholarship, pedagogy, and theatre-making" has influenced theatrical and pedagogical practices in the United States and abroad.

== Education ==
Cohen grew up in Montgomery Alabama, graduated in 1963 from Sidney Lanier High School (“the Poets”), obtained his A.B. at Dartmouth College in 1967, and earned his PhD in English Renaissance Literature at Duke University in 1973.

== Pedagogy ==
Cohen joined the faculty of James Madison University in 1973, where he taught courses in playwriting, film, early modern literature, and in particular Shakespeare. Convinced that a grasp of what was happening on the stage enhanced a student of literature’s understanding and enjoyment of Shakespeare’s text, Cohen took student groups to London in 1975 and in 1978 established JMU’s semester-long London program. The program was the first of its kind and was the model for international education at JMU. "During his decade-long tenure as director of study abroad, Ralph collaborated with JMU faculty members Kathleen Arthur, Carmenza Kline and David Ley to establish semester programs in Florence, Italy; Salamanca, Spain; and Paris."

Cohen led workshops and published articles on teaching, edited two special editions of the Shakespeare Quarterly (1990 and 1995) with essays devoted entirely to the classroom teaching of Shakespeare, and directed NEH Summer Institutes (1995, 2002, 2004, 2008) for college professors on using performance to teach Shakespeare. He challenged the common belief that Shakespeare’s language was archaic but argued instead that over 98% of the words in his plays are still in common usage. His book, ShakesFear and How to Cure It: The Complete Handbook for Teaching Shakespeare, gives teachers ways to help students make the words their own.

=== MFA Program in Shakespeare and Performance ===
Two years prior to the opening of the Blackfriars Playhouse, Cohen proposed a three-year Master of Letters and Fine Arts program in Shakespeare and Performance at Mary Baldwin University timed to open with the completion of the Blackfriars. His concept was a 360° holistic approach to training in acting, directing, pedagogy, dramaturgy, and management with the Blackfriars playhouse at its core. After enrollment increased, Cohen retired from JMU and became Gonder Professor of Shakespeare at Mary Baldwin. In 2004, at Cohen’s request, Dame Judi Dench gowned the first three MFA recipients. As of Cohen’s retirement in 2022 the program conferred more than three-hundred degrees, and in his honor the faculty of the program created the annual Ralph Alan Cohen Award celebrating the graduate who most embodied the idea of a scholar practitioner.

== Theatre-Making ==
Cohen began directing with the JMU mainstage production of The Taming of the Shrew in 1983. Inspired by the success of a minimal production approach to Shakespeare by companies such as Cheek by Jowl during the JMU semesters in London, Cohen developed an interest "in Elizabethan staging practices and recreating those for audiences today." In 1988, when his former student Jim Warren played the title role in the JMU production of Henry V, Warren suggested he and Cohen form the Shenandoah Shakespeare Express. The SSE was a touring company of twelve actors committed to shows no longer than “two hours traffic of the stage,” to audiences sharing light with the actors, and with actors clear on the meaning of every word they spoke. Those conditions drew enthusiastic support from scholars and multiple bookings at campuses across the country — a decade after its founding, the SSE had traveled to 47 states and 7 foreign countries — and an annual invitation to stage their three-show rep at the Folger Shakespeare Library Theatre in D.C.

As a director, Cohen prioritizes sound over sight and reminds his actors that Shakespeare’s audience went to “hear” rather than “see” a play. At JMU he directed the first ever revival of Thomas Middleton’s 1607 play Your Five Gallants and co-edited it for The Collected Works of Thomas Middleton. His 2000 SSE production of Francis Beaumont’s 1607 The Knight of the Burning Pestle (1607) was only the second American production of the play (after the San Diego’s Old Globe 1957 production). An early advocate on non-traditional casting, Cohen cast a Black man, Eric Quander, as Caesar in his 1989 production of Julius Caesar; and in his 1998 production of Richard III, he cast a woman, Kate Eastwood Norris, in the title role.

Cohen believes the audience is the lost component in theatre, the part of the essential triad of actor-script-audience that cannot be replicated on film. In numerous articles, in his book ShakeFear, and his TEDx presentation, “The Case of the Audience Held Hostage in the Dark,” Cohen calls for producers of Shakespeare to “leave the lights on” to restore the two-way dynamic between performer and audience.

== The American Shakespeare Center ==
The success of Cohen and Warren's Shenandoah Shakespeare Express and that of the new graduate program at MBU were the result of their work at the intersection of performance, education, and research. In 1998 they changed the theatre company’s name to something less regional, and in 2005 Cohen suggested it reflect the idea of Staunton as a place for the exploration of the plays of Shakespeare and his contemporaries by importing as well as exporting programming, and the once Shenandoah Shakespeare Express became the American Shakespeare Center.

=== The Blackfriars Playhouse ===
In 1995 Cohen entered discussions with a group of businessmen and the Director of Financial Development from nearby Staunton VA, who were interested in having the company build a theatre. Taking advantage of the publicity surrounding the opening of Sam Wanamaker’s Globe in London, Cohen successfully proposed to the City Council that the new theatre be a recreation of the Blackfriars, became the chief spokesperson for the fundraising campaign, and worked closely with Andrew Gurr, the head of research at Shakespeare’s Globe in London and with the project’s lead architect, Tom McLaughlin, on its design. The Blackfriars Playhouse opened its doors to the public on September 21, 2001. To celebrate the opening, Cohen directed The Alchemist, Ben Jonson’s 1610 comedy set entirely in the Blackfriars.

=== The Blackfriars Conference ===
Cohen organized the Blackfriars Conference in October 2001. It appealed equally to established Shakespeareans and a new generation of teachers, scholars, and artists. The conference is biannual and has generated four books of essays: Inside Shakespeare (ed. Paul Menzer), Thunder at the Playhouse (eds. Peter Kanelos and Matt Kozusko), Who Hears in Shakespeare (eds. Laurie Magnus and Walter Cannon), Shakespeare in the Light: Essays in Honor of Ralph Alan Cohen (eds. Paul Menzer and Amy R. Cohen).

=== Language for Leadership and Performance ===
In 2003 the Federal Executive Institute in nearby Charlottesville VA asked Cohen to create leadership workshops for a number of government agencies. Cohen designed the workshops based on his research in classical rhetoric as it appears in the language of Shakespeare’s characters. His 2012 keynote address, “Sweet Smoke of Rhetoric,” to the artistic directors at the annual conference of the Shakespeare Theatre Association, demonstrated how an understanding of key figures of speech could enhance their actors’ performance in the same way that John Barton had done with verse speaking in Playing Shakespeare. The ASC’s Education department subsequently published study guides for twenty of the plays showing how to teachers can use figures of speech to clarify work and to produce set of flashcards “ROADS to Rhetoric."

=== Actor Agency and the “Renaissance Season” ===
In 2005 Cohen and Warren decided, as a cost-cutting measure during January through March when ticket sales were low, to have their most veteran actors mount their productions without directors. A year later Tiffany Stern’s groundbreaking Rehearsals from Shakespeare to Sheridan validated the authenticity of this practice, and the fifteen-week “Ren Season” became a fixture of the ASC’s yearlong calendar. His Bernard Beckerman address to the Columbia Shakespeare Seminar, “Directitude! What’s That?,” makes the case that the late emergence of the position of director in the 19th century imposed an autocracy on what had been a collaborative art. In “Each Actor on His Ass,” the Theo Cosby lecture for Shakespeare’s Globe, Cohen challenged the Artistic Director of the Globe to create an ensemble of actors empowered to embody the fundamental original practice of putting on a show.

== Awards and honors ==
- 1984 James Madison University’s Distinguished Teaching Award
- 1985 Commencement Speaker
- 1986 James Madison University’s Madison Scholar Award
- 1987 State Council on Higher Education in Virginia’s Outstanding Faculty Award
- 1990 James Madison University’s Dominion Fellow Award
- 1998 Honorary Doctorate from St. Lawrence University
- 2003 Honorary Doctorate from Georgetown University
- 2007 Association of Educational Publishers Distinguished Achievement Award (Professional Development)
- 2008 Virginia Commonwealth’s Governor’s Arts Award
- 2009 Theo Crosby Fellow at Shakespeare's Globe in London
- 2013 Folger Shakespeare Library’s Shakespeare Steward Award
- 2014 Shakespeare’s Globe’s Sam Wanamaker Award
- 2016 Forbes Center Circle of Excellence Award
- 2016 (2015?) Distinguished Alumni Award from the Duke University Graduate School
- 2018 Shenandoah Valley’s Circle of Arts Award
- 2022 Shakespeare Theatre Association’s Douglas N. Cook Lifetime Achievement Award
- 2022 The Sullivan Foundation’s Algernon Sydney Sullivan Award
