= Shakespeare's Globe Centres =

International centres for theatrical education and promotion

Coordinates: 51.508°N 0.097°W

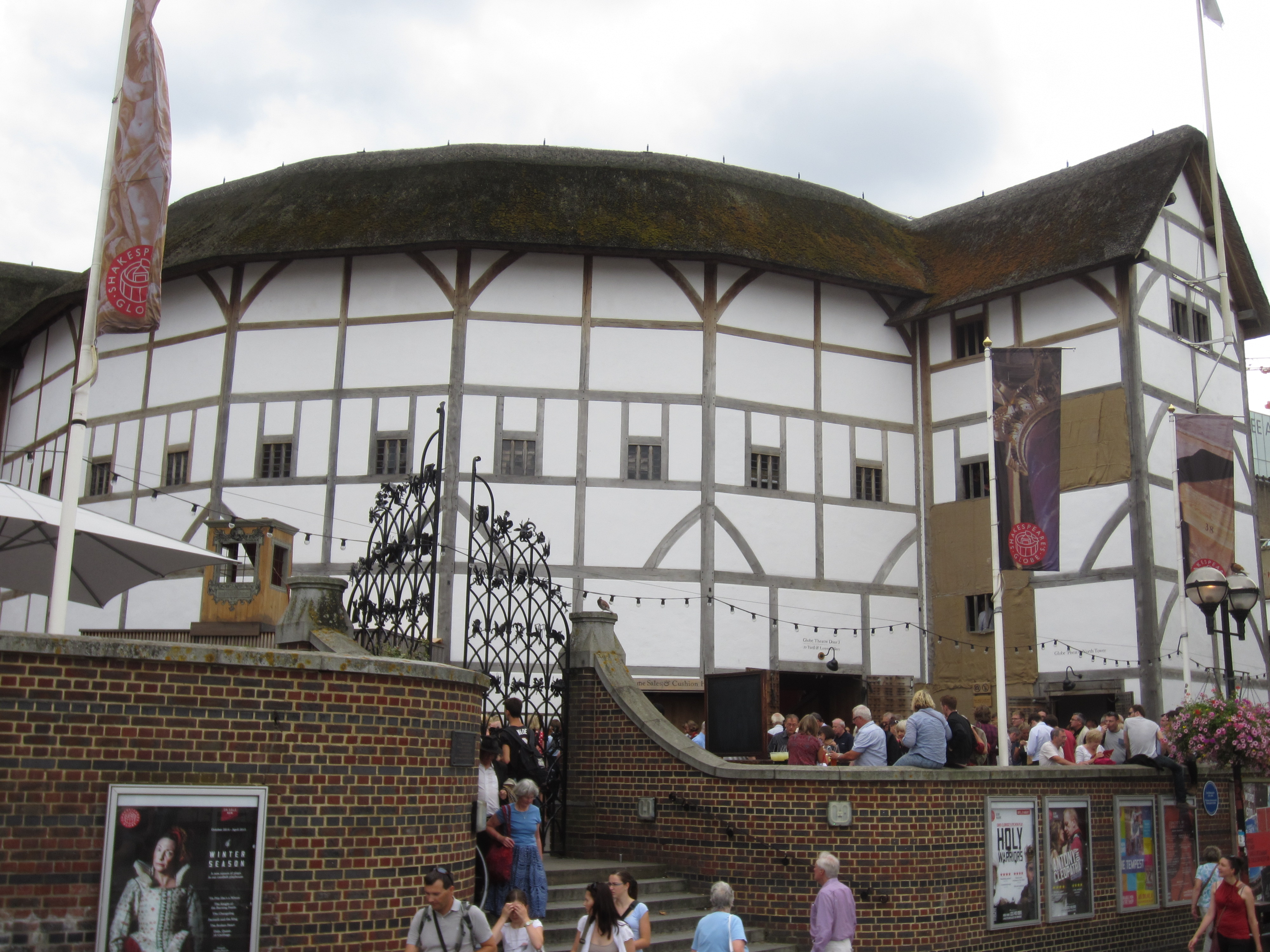
The reconstructed Globe in London

The Shakespeare's Globe Centres are international centres for theatrical education and for the promotion of the Shakespeare's Globe in London, their nucleus organisation.

== Shakespeare Globe Centre Canada ==
The Shakespeare Globe Centre of Canada was founded in Toronto in 1985 by Christina and Lyle Blair as a not-for-profit organisation, with a board including John Orrell and Christopher Plummer.

== Shakespeare Globe Centre Germany ==
The SGC (Shakespeare Globe Zentrum Deutschland) was founded in 1991 after Sam Wanamaker experienced the Bremer Shakespeare Company's productions of The Taming of the Shrew and Antony and Cleopatra at the Globe Theatre in Neuss and directed by the company's co-founder Norbert Kentrup. It was officially registered in December 2000, and its boardmembers include Kentrup, Dagmar Papula, Heinz Abeling (SET) and Dr. Vanessa Schormann.

== Shakespeare Globe Centre New Zealand ==
Sam Wanamaker visited New Zealand in 1990, and the Shakespeare Globe Centre New Zealand was founded in Wellington the following year by Dawn Sanders. Through it, the Wellington Shakespeare Society contributed what are now called the New Zealand Hangings, tapestries for scenery at the Globe.

== Shakespeare Globe Centre USA ==
The Shakespeare Globe Centre USA, in New York City, was the first to be founded, in 1974, as a launchpad for the reconstruction of the Globe Theatre in London. Throughout the 1980s, American director Louis Fantasia taught at the Shakespeare's Globe Centre in London, collaborating with Sam Wanamaker. Fantasia later served as director of the Shakespeare Globe's Teaching Shakespeare Through Performance Institute in London.
