= Sam Wanamaker =

American actor and director (1919–1993)

Sam Wanamaker CBE
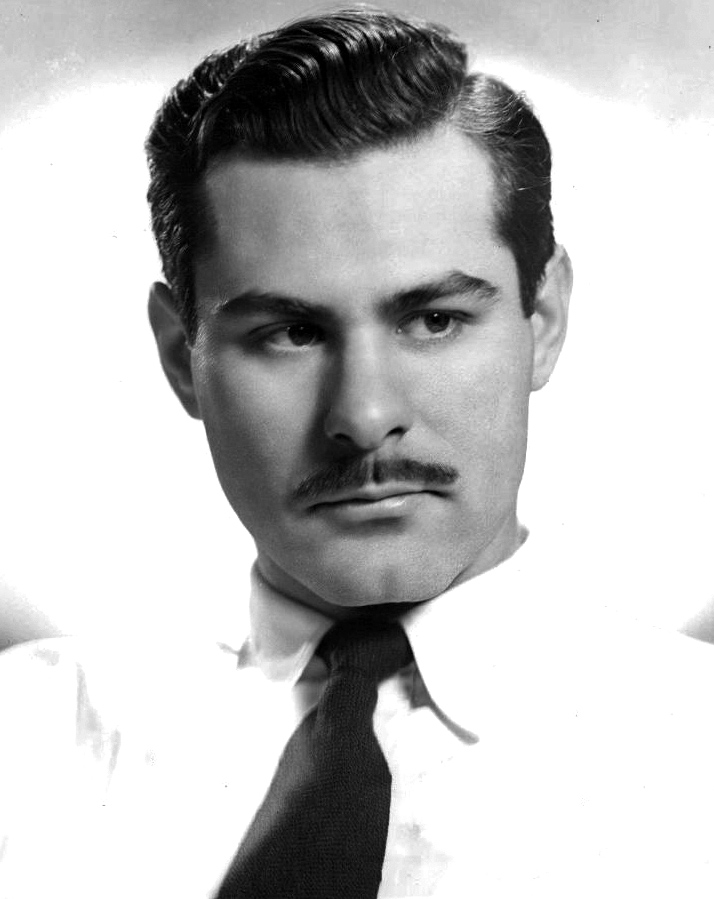
- Wanamaker in 1961
- Born: Samuel Wattenmacker; June 14, 1919; Chicago, Illinois, U.S.
- Died: December 18, 1993 (aged 74); London, England
- Education: Goodman School of Drama; Art Institute of Chicago; Drake University
- Occupations: Actor; director
- Years active: 1934–1993
- Spouse: Charlotte Holland (m. 1940)
- Children: 3, including Zoë
- Relatives: Marc Wanamaker (nephew)

Samuel Wanamaker (né Wattenmacker; June 14, 1919 – December 18, 1993) was an American actor and director, whose career on stage and in film and television spanned five decades. He began his career on Broadway, but spent much of his professional life in the United Kingdom, where he emigrated after becoming fearful of being blacklisted in Hollywood in the 1950s due to his communist views.

Wanamaker became extensively involved in British theater, while continuing film and television work, eventually returning to some Hollywood productions while continuing to live in the UK. There, he is also credited as the person most responsible for the modern recreation of Shakespeare's Globe theatre in London, where he is commemorated in the name of the Sam Wanamaker Playhouse, the site's second theatre. He was awarded an honorary CBE for his work.

Wanamaker was the father of actress Zoë Wanamaker, and the uncle of film historian Marc Wanamaker.

== Early life ==
Wanamaker was born in Chicago, the son of tailor Maurice Wattenmacker (Manus Watmakher) and Molly (née Bobele). His parents were both Jewish immigrants from the Russian Empire. His father Maurice was from Mykolaiv, in present-day Ukraine. He was the younger of two brothers, the elder being William, who became a cardiologist at Cedars-Sinai Medical Center.

He trained at the Goodman School of Drama, then at the Art Institute of Chicago (now at DePaul University) and at Drake University. He began working with summer stock theatre companies in Chicago and northern Wisconsin, where he helped build the stage of the Peninsula Players Theatre in 1937.

== Career ==
Wanamaker began his acting career in traveling shows and later worked on Broadway. In 1942, he starred with Ingrid Bergman in Joan of Lorraine and directed Two Gentlemen from Athens the following year.

In 1943, Wanamaker was part of the cast of the play Counterattack at the National Theatre in Washington, D.C. During the play, he became enamored of the ideals of communism. He attended Drake University before serving in the U.S. Army from 1943 to 1946, during World War II. In 1947, he returned to civilian life as an actor and director. In 1948, he starred in and directed the original Broadway production of Goodbye, My Fancy.

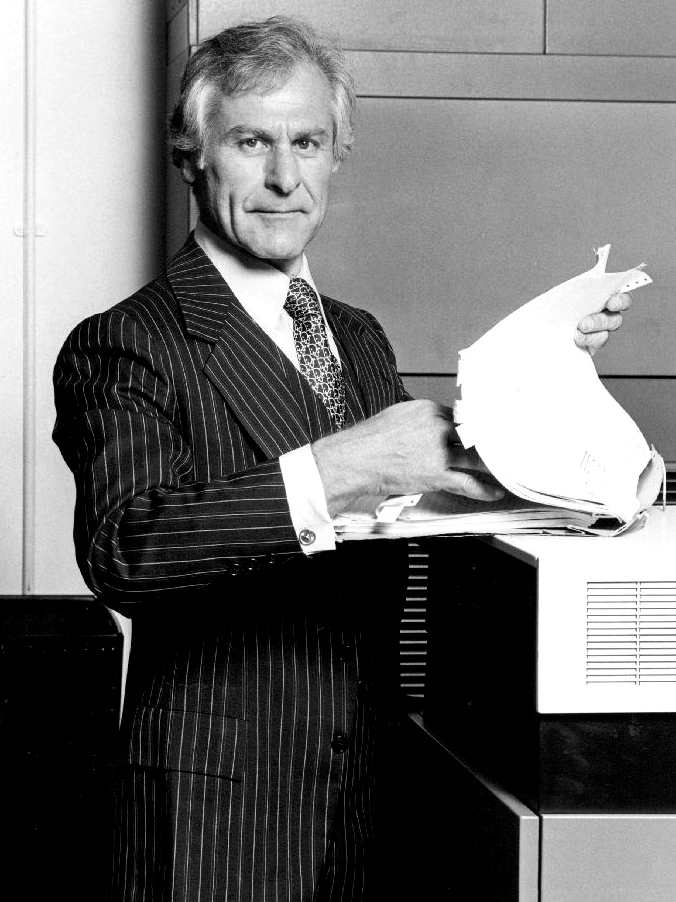
As Stanley Goldblum in The Billion Dollar Bubble (1976)

In 1951, Wanamaker made a speech welcoming the return of two of the Hollywood Ten. In 1952, at the height of the McCarthy "Red Scare" period, Wanamaker, who was then acting in the UK, learned that despite his distinguished service in the Army during World War II, his years as a communist could lead to his being blacklisted in Hollywood. (Note: The BBC documentary Who Do You Think You Are? broadcast on February 24, 2009, revealed that the FBI had kept a substantial investigation file for him, including incriminating witness statements, and that the House Un-American Activities Committee had intended to subpoena him as a witness. His activities were also reportedly monitored by MI5.) He consequently decided to remain in England, where he reestablished his career as a stage and film actor, along with becoming a director and producer. He explained:

In 1950 I went to England to do a play, and around that time the whole McCarthy witch-hunting era had taken hold in Hollywood—so I just stayed in Britain. I knew that because I had worked with actors who had problems in Hollywood, I might have difficulties.

In 1952, he made his debut as both actor and director in London in Clifford Odets' Winter Journey. The play, which co-starred Michael Redgrave, was considered "sensational" by critics. He later appeared in other plays, including The Big Knife, The Shrike, The Rainmaker, and A Hatful of Rain. For a revival of Seán O'Casey's Purple Dust in 1953 he invited Gerard Hoffnung to design the drop-cloth, and Wanamaker was later to be the producer of the first Hoffnung Festival Concert (1959). In 1956, he directed the British premiere of Bertolt Brecht and Kurt Weill's musical play The Threepenny Opera (revived in New York in 1954 in a translation by Marc Blitzstein.)

In 1957, he was appointed director of the neglected New Shakespeare Theatre in Liverpool. He brought a number of notable productions to the theatre, such as A View from the Bridge, Cat on a Hot Tin Roof, The Rose Tattoo and Bus Stop. It was also transformed into a lively arts centre as a result of including other cultural attractions, such as films, lectures, jazz concerts and art exhibits.

As a result of all his various activities, Wanamaker became London's "favourite American actor and director", noted The Guardian. In 1959, he joined the Shakespeare Memorial Theatre company at Stratford-upon-Avon, playing Iago to Paul Robeson's Othello in Tony Richardson's production that year. In the 1960s and 1970s, he produced or directed several works at venues including the Royal Opera House, Covent Garden, and directed the Shakespeare Birthday Celebrations in 1974. In September that year he also produced the first opera to be mounted in the new Sydney Opera House - War and Peace by Prokofiev.

As a director and actor, he worked in films and television, with a role in The Spiral Staircase (1974). Wanamaker eventually returned to Hollywood films including Private Benjamin (1980), Raw Deal (1986), Superman IV: The Quest for Peace (1987), and Baby Boom (1987). He was nominated for a Primetime Emmy Award for Outstanding Supporting Actor in a Drama Series for his performance in the 1978 ABC television miniseries Holocaust.

In 1968, he produced and directed the pilot episode of the Western TV series Lancer. A fictional version of this is depicted in the 2019 film Once Upon a Time in Hollywood, and the 2021 novel of the same name. Wanamaker is portrayed by Nicholas Hammond in the film.

He also directed stage productions, including the world premiere production of Michael Tippett's opera The Ice Break. In 1980, he directed Giuseppe Verdi's opera Aida starring Luciano Pavarotti at San Francisco Opera (now broadcast version released as DVD). He was also featured as the widowed and ruthless department store owner Simon Berrenger on the short-lived television drama Berrenger's in 1985.

=== Restoring the Globe theatre ===
He was a hard-headed romantic—and a genuinely courteous man—driven by a passion for Shakespeare. The Globe will be his lasting monument.

— The Guardian, London

In 1970 Wanamaker's career took a dramatic turn. He was annoyed that, while a number of replicas of the Globe theatre existed in the United States, the site of the original in London was marked only by a plaque on a nearby brewery. He made it his goal to create an exact replica of the Globe to feature plays and a museum.

It became Wanamaker's "great obsession" to recreate Shakespeare's Globe at its original location. He secured financial support from philanthropists and fellow lovers of Shakespeare, such as Samuel H. Scripps, to ensure that it would be built.

Wanamaker founded the International Shakespeare's Globe Centre in London and the Shakespeare Globe Trust, which raised well over ten million dollars. Wanamaker collaborated with American theatre director Louis Fantasia on the creation of the Globe, having Fantasia teach extensively at the Centre and eventually having Fantasia become director of the Globe's Teaching Shakespeare Through Performance Institute in London until 2002, well after Wanamaker's passing. This inspired the creation of Shakespeare's Globe Centres around the world, many of which Wanamaker participated in.

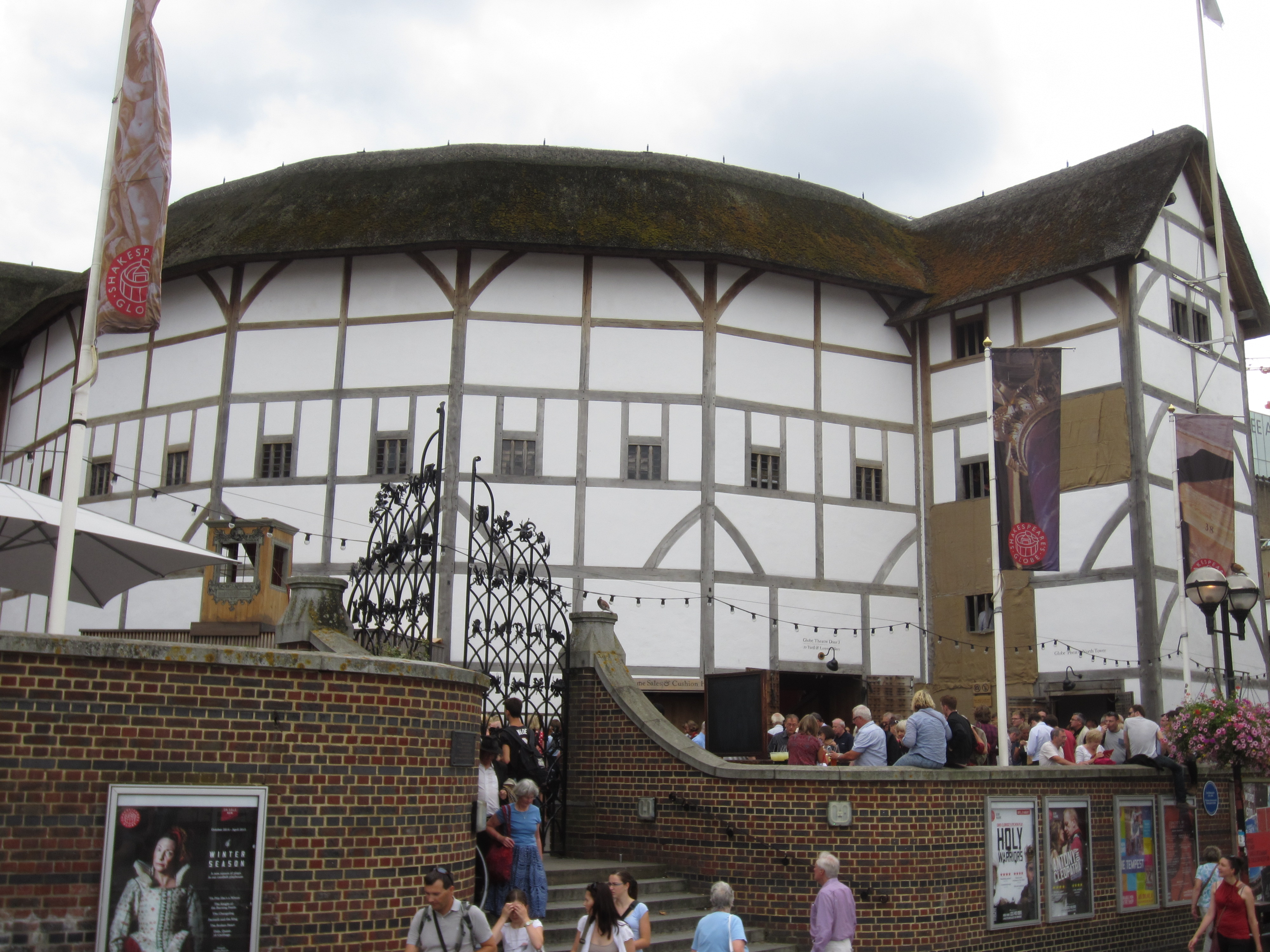
London's restored Globe theatre in 2014

Though, as in the late 16th and 17th centuries, the 20th century Royal family were more or less supportive, British officialdom was far less so. They wanted to develop the site for new high-rise housing and commercial use. English Heritage, which controlled the site, refused to give Wanamaker the precise dimensions of the original Globe.

According to Karl Meyer of The New York Times:

The Shakespeare project helped Mr. Wanamaker keep his sanity and dignity intact. On his first visit to London in 1949, he had sought traces of the original theatre and was astonished to find only a blackened plaque on an unused brewery. He found this neglect inexplicable, and in 1970 launched the Shakespeare Globe Trust, later obtaining the building site and necessary permissions despite a hostile local council. He siphoned his earnings as actor and director into the project, undismayed by the scepticism of his British colleagues.

On the south bank of the River Thames in London, near where the modern recreation of Shakespeare's Globe stands today, is a plaque that reads: "In Thanksgiving for Sam Wanamaker, Actor, Director, Producer, 1919–1993, whose vision rebuilt Shakespeare's Globe Theatre on Bankside in this parish". There is a blue plaque on the river-side wall of the theatre. The site's Jacobean indoor theatre, opened in January 2014, is named the Sam Wanamaker Playhouse after him.

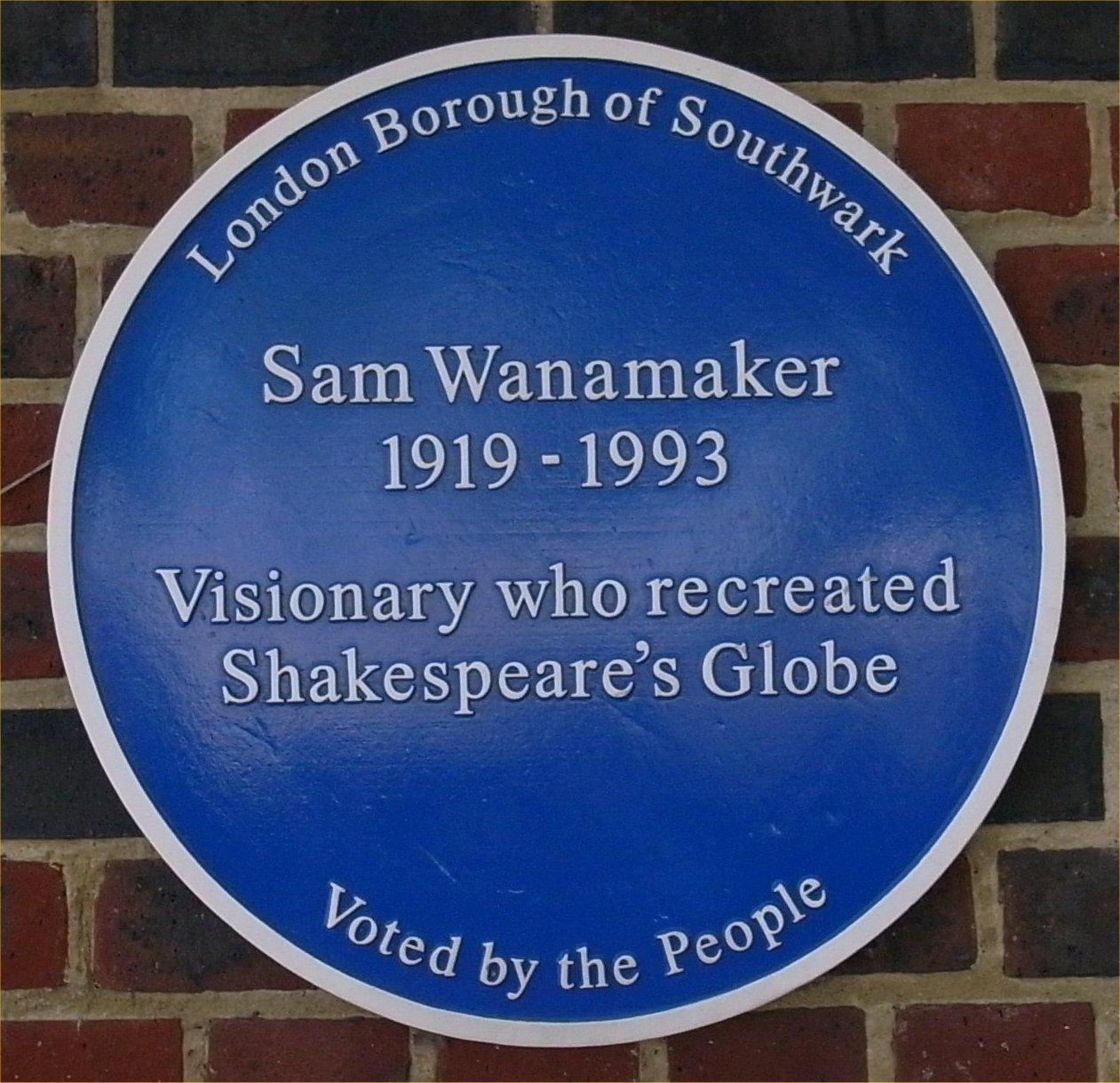
Plaque honoring Wanamaker's restoration

For his work in reconstructing the Globe theatre, Wanamaker, in July 1993, was made an honorary Commander of the Order of the British Empire (CBE). He was also honoured with the Benjamin Franklin Medal by the Royal Society of Arts in recognition of his contribution to theatre.

When multi-Tony Award-winning British actor Mark Rylance accepted his third Tony on stage in New York City during the televised ceremonies on June 8, 2014, he did so with a note of thanks to Wanamaker.

== Personal life ==
In 1940, Wanamaker married Canadian actress Charlotte Holland.

In the 1970s, he reportedly entered into a long-lasting personal relationship with the American actress Jan Sterling. In the 2014 memoir I Said Yes to Everything, Lee Grant claimed that during production of the film Voyage of the Damned (1976), Wanamaker engaged in an affair with British actress Lynne Frederick, who was 21 at the time.

Actress Zoë Wanamaker (b. 1949) is his daughter, and film historian Marc Wanamaker (b. 1947) is his nephew.

=== Death ===
Wanamaker died of lung cancer in London on December 18, 1993, aged 74, before the grand opening of the Globe by Queen Elizabeth II on June 12, 1997. He was survived by three daughters, Abby, Zoë, and Jessica.

== Filmography ==
=== Film ===
==== Actor ====
- My Girl Tisa (1948) as Mark Denek
- Give Us This Day (1949) as Geremio
- Mr. Denning Drives North (1952) as Chick Eddowes
- The Secret (1955) as Nick Delaney
- The Battle of the Sexes (1959) as Narrator (voice)
- The Criminal (1960) as Mike Carter
- Taras Bulba (1962) as Filipenko
- Man in the Middle (1964) as Maj. Leon Kaufman
- The Spy Who Came In from the Cold (1965) as Peters
- Those Magnificent Men in Their Flying Machines (1965) as George Gruber
- Warning Shot (1967) as Frank Sanderman
- The Day the Fish Came Out (1967) as Elias
- Danger Route (1968) as Lucinda
- The Spiral Staircase (1975) as Lieutenant Fields
- The Sell Out (1976) as Harry Sickles
- Voyage of the Damned (1976) as Carl Rosen
- Billy Jack Goes to Washington (1977) as Bailey
- The Billion Dollar Bubble (1978) as Stanley Goldblum
- Death on the Nile (1978) as Sterndale Rockford
- From Hell to Victory (1979) as Ray MacDonald
- Private Benjamin (1980) as Teddy Benjamin
- The Competition (1980) as Andrew Erskine
- Irreconcilable Differences (1984) as David Kessler
- The Aviator (1985) as Bruno Hansen
- Raw Deal (1986) as Luigi Patrovita
- Baby Boom (1987) as Fritz Curtis
- Superman IV: The Quest for Peace (1987) as David Warfield
- Judgment in Berlin (1988) as Bernard Hellring
- Cognac (1988) as Ambassador Morley
- Guilty by Suspicion (1991) as Felix Graff
- Pure Luck (1991) as Highsmith

==== Director ====
- The File of the Golden Goose (1969)
- The Executioner (1970)
- Catlow (1971)
- Sinbad and the Eye of the Tiger (1977)

=== Television ===
==== Actor ====
- Holocaust (1978 TV Mini-Series) as Moses Weiss
- Cameo Theatre in "Manhattan Footstep" (episode # 1.4) June 7, 1950
- Danger Man – as Patrick Laurence in "The Lonely Chair" (episode # 1.8) October 30, 1960
- The Defenders – as Dr. Ralph Ames in "The Hundred Lives of Harry Simms" (episode # 1.7) October 28, 1961
- The Defenders – as James Henry David in "A Book for Burning" (episode # 2.27) March 30, 1963
- Man of the World – as Nicko in "The Bandit" (episode # 2.1) May 11, 1963
- Espionage – as Sprague in "Festival of Pawns" (episode # 1.10) December 11, 1963
- The Outer Limits – as Dr. Simon Holm in "A Feasibility Study" (episode # 1.29) April 13, 1964
- The Defenders – as Edward Banter in "Hollow Triumph" (episode # 3.35) June 20, 1964
- The Defenders – as United States Attorney Brooker in "A Taste of Ashes" (episode # 4.8) November 12, 1964
- The Wild Wild West – as Dr. Arcularis in "The Night of the Howling Light" (episode # 1.14) December 17, 1965
- Gunsmoke – as Asa Longworth in "Parson Comes to Town" (episode # 11.31) April 30, 1966
- Run for Your Life – as Major Joe Rankin in two episodes
- The Baron – as Sefton Folkard in "You Can't Win Them All" (episode # 1.19) February 1, 1967
- Judd for the Defense – as Shelly Gould in "The Gates of Cerberus" (episode # 2.8) November 15, 1968
- Thirty-Minute Theatre in "A Wen" (episode # 1.233) December 27, 1971
- Arturo UI (1972, TV Movie) as O'Casey
- The Law (1974, TV Movie) as Jules Benson
- Mousey (1974, ABC Movie of the Week) as Inspector
- Rafferty – as Hollander in "Rafferty" (Pilot) (episode # 1.1) September 5, 1977
- Return of the Saint – as Domenico in "Dragonseed" (episode # 1.22) February 25, 1979
- Charlie Muffin (1979, TV Movie) as Ruttgers
- Winston Churchill: The Wilderness Years (1981, TV movie) as Bernard Baruch
- Our Family Business (1981, TV Movie) as Ralph
- I Was a Mail Order Bride (1982, TV Movie) as Frank Tosconi
- Heartsounds (1984, TV Movie) as Moe Silverman
- The Ghost Writer (1984, TV Movie) as E.I. Lonoff
- Berrenger's (1985, TV Series) as Simon Berrenger
- Embassy (1985, TV Movie) as Ambassador Arthur Ingram
- Deceptions (1985, TV Movie) as Jim Nolan
- Sadie and Son (1987, TV Movie) as Marty Goldstein
- The Two Mrs. Grenvilles (1987, TV Movie) as District Attorney
- Baby Boom (1988) as Fritz Curtis
- The Shell Seekers (1989, TV Movie) as Richard
- Always Remember I Love You (1990, TV Movie) as Grandfather Mendham
- Running Against Time (1990, TV Movie) as Doctor Koopman
- Killer Rules (1993, TV Movie) as Gambon
- Bloodlines: Murder in the Family (1993, TV Movie) as Gerald Woodman
- Wild Justice (1994, TV Movie) as Kingston Parker

==== Director ====
- The Defenders – episode "Eyewitness" (1965)
- Court Martial – episode "The Bitter Wind" (1966)
- Hawk – episodes "Do Not Mutilate or Spindle", "Game with a Dead End" and "How Close Can You Get?" (1966)
- Cimarron Strip – episode "Broken Wing" (1967)
- Custer – episode "Sabers in the Sun" (1967)
- Dundee and the Culhane – episode "The Jubilee Raid Brief" (1967)
- Coronet Blue – episodes "The Rebels", "Man Running", "Saturday" and "The Presence of Evil" (1967)
- Lancer – episode "The High Riders" (1968)
- Premiere – episode "Lassiter" (1968)
- The Champions – episode "To Trap A Rat" (1968)
- Columbo: The Bye-Bye Sky High IQ Murder Case (1977)
- David Cassidy: Man Undercover – episode "Cage of Steel" (1978)
- Hart to Hart – episode "Death in the Slow Lane" (1979)
- Return of the Saint – episode "Vicious Circle" (1979)
- Mrs. Columbo – episodes "A Puzzle for Prophets" and "Falling Star" (1979)
- The Killing of Randy Webster (1981)
- Columbo: Grand Deceptions (1989)
