= TTOTS =

In literature, TTOTS may refer to:

- The Taming of the Shrew, a 16th-century comedy by William Shakespeare
- The Turn of the Screw, a 20th-century horror novella by Henry James
