= Shakespeare Quarterly =

- Discipline: Literature, performing arts
- Language: English
- Edited by: Jeremy Lopez

Publication details
- History: 1950-present
- Publisher: Oxford University Press for the Folger Shakespeare Library (United States)
- Frequency: Quarterly

Standard abbreviations
- ISO 4: Shakespeare Q.

Indexing
- ISSN: 0037-3222 (print); 1538-3555 (web)
- JSTOR: 00373222
- OCLC no.: 1644507

Links
- Journal homepage; Online access

Shakespeare Quarterly is a peer-reviewed academic journal established in 1950 by the Shakespeare Association of America. It is now under the auspices of the Folger Shakespeare Library. Along with book and performance criticism, Shakespeare Quarterly incorporates scholarly research and essays on Shakespeare and the age in which he worked, particularly those that explore new perspectives. It includes a special section devoted to the latest ideas in Shakespeare scholarship.

As a companion, the Folger Library also publishes the reference database World Shakespeare Bibliography Online, which contains more than 125,000 annotated bibliographical references and several hundred thousand reviews.

The editor of Shakespeare Quarterly is Jeremy Lopez (Montclair State University). The World Shakespeare Bibliography is edited by Dr. Heidi Craig (Texas A&M University).

== See also ==
- Folger Shakespeare Library
- Shakespeare's plays
- English Renaissance theatre
- Shakespeare on screen
