= Lost plays =

Lost plays could refer to the plays lost to history of a few playwrights including:

- Shakespeare's plays#Lost plays
- Aeschylus#Lost_plays
