= Connotations (journal) =

- Discipline: English literature
- Language: English
- Edited by: Inge Leimberg, Matthias Bauer, Burkhard Niederhoff, Angelika Zirker

Publication details
- History: 1991–present
- Publisher: Connotations Society for Critical Debate/Waxmann Verlag
- Frequency: Continuous

Standard abbreviations
- ISO 4: Connotations

Indexing
- ISSN: 2626-8183

Links
- Journal homepage

Connotations: A Journal for Critical Debate is a peer-reviewed open-access academic journal that was established in 1991 covering the field of English literature (from the Middle English period to the present), as well as American and other anglophone literature. It is published by the Connotations Society for Critical Debate in collaboration with Waxmann Verlag (Münster/New York). The society was founded in 1998 and is formed by the private subscribers to the journal and organizes biennial symposia. As of 2024, the editors-in-chief are Inge Leimberg (University of Münster), Matthias Bauer (Tübingen University), Burkhard Niederhoff (Ruhr University Bochum), and Angelika Zirker (Tübingen University). The journal is abstracted and indexed in the MLA Bibliography, the World Shakespeare Bibliography and the International Bibliography of Periodical Literature.
