= Shakespeare's plays =

Plays of the English playwright

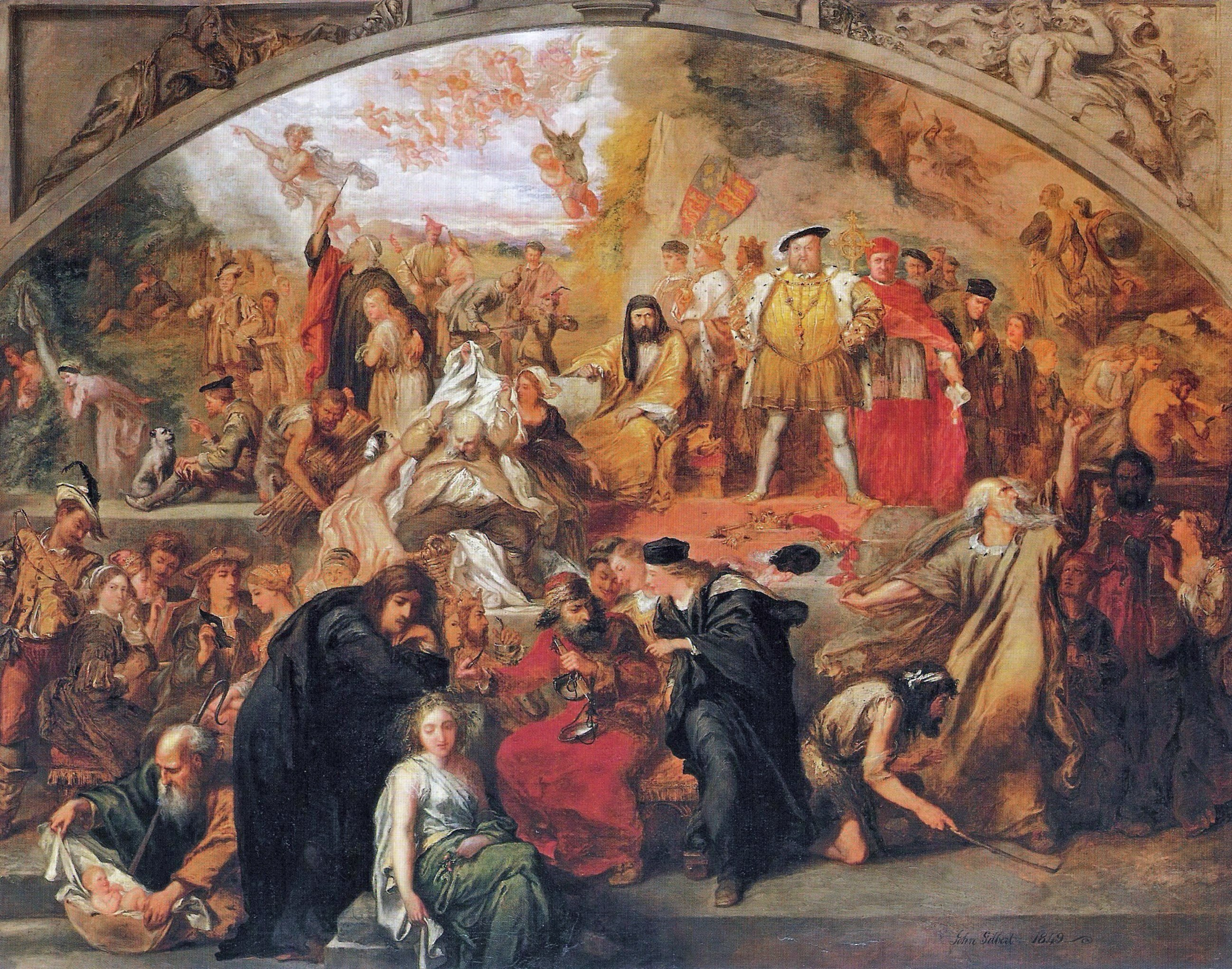
Sir John Gilbert's 1849 painting: The Plays of Shakespeare, containing scenes and characters from several of William Shakespeare's plays

Shakespeare's plays are a canon of approximately 39 dramatic works written by the English playwright and poet William Shakespeare. The exact number of plays as well as their classifications as tragedy, history, comedy, or otherwise is a matter of scholarly debate. Shakespeare's plays are widely regarded as among the greatest in the English language and are continually performed around the world. The plays have been translated into every major living language.

Many of his plays appeared in print as a series of quartos, but approximately half of them remained unpublished until 1623, when the posthumous First Folio was published. The traditional division of his plays into tragedies, comedies, and histories follows the categories used in the First Folio. However, modern criticism has labelled some of these plays "problem plays" that elude easy categorisation, or perhaps purposely break generic conventions, and has introduced the term romances for what scholars believe to be his later comedies.

When Shakespeare first arrived in London in the late 1580s or early 1590s, dramatists writing for London's new commercial playhouses (such as The Curtain) were combining two strands of dramatic tradition into a new and distinctively Elizabethan synthesis. Previously, the most common forms of popular English theatre were the Tudor morality plays. These plays, generally celebrating piety, use personified moral attributes to urge or instruct the protagonist to choose the virtuous life over Evil. The characters and plot situations are largely symbolic rather than realistic. As a child, Shakespeare would likely have seen this type of play (along with, perhaps, mystery plays and miracle plays).

The other strand of dramatic tradition was classical aesthetic theory. This theory was derived ultimately from Aristotle; in Renaissance England, however, the theory was better known through its Roman interpreters and practitioners. At the universities, plays were staged in a more academic form as Roman closet dramas. These plays, usually performed in Latin, adhered to classical ideas of unity and decorum, but they were also more static, valuing lengthy speeches over physical action. Shakespeare would have learned this theory at grammar school, where Plautus and especially Terence were key parts of the curriculum and were taught in editions with lengthy theoretical introductions.

== Theatre and stage setup ==
Archaeological excavations on the foundations of the Rose and the Globe in the late twentieth century suggested that all London English Renaissance theatres were built around similar general plans. Despite individual differences, the public theatres were three stories high and built around an open space at the center. Usually polygonal in plan to give an overall rounded effect, three levels of inward-facing galleries overlooked the open center into which jutted the stage—essentially a platform surrounded on three sides by the audience, only the rear being restricted for the entrances and exits of the actors and seating for the musicians. The upper level behind the stage could be used as a balcony, as in Romeo and Juliet, or as a position for a character to harangue a crowd, as in Julius Caesar.

Usually built of timber, lath and plaster and with thatched roofs, the early theatres were vulnerable to fire, and gradually were replaced (when necessary) with stronger structures. When the Globe burned down in June 1613, it was rebuilt with a tile roof.

A different model was developed with the Blackfriars Theatre, which came into regular use on a long term basis in 1599. The Blackfriars was small in comparison to the earlier theatres, and roofed rather than open to the sky; it resembled a modern theatre in ways that its predecessors did not.

== Elizabethan Shakespeare ==
For Shakespeare, as he began to write, both traditions were alive; they were, moreover, filtered through the recent success of the University Wits on the London stage. By the late 16th century, the popularity of morality and academic plays waned as the English Renaissance took hold, and playwrights like Thomas Kyd and Christopher Marlowe revolutionised theatre. Their plays blended the old morality drama with classical theory to produce a new secular form. The new drama combined the rhetorical complexity of the academic play with the bawdy energy of the moralities. However, it was more ambiguous and complex in its meanings, and less concerned with simple allegory. Inspired by this new style, Shakespeare continued these artistic strategies, creating plays that not only resonated on an emotional level with audiences but also explored and debated the basic elements of what it means to be human. What Marlowe and Kyd did for tragedy, John Lyly and George Peele, among others, did for comedy: they offered models of witty dialogue, romantic action, and exotic, often pastoral location that formed the basis of Shakespeare's comedic mode throughout his career.

Shakespeare's Elizabethan tragedies (including the history plays with tragic designs, such as Richard II) demonstrate his relative independence from classical models. He takes from Aristotle and Horace the notion of decorum; with few exceptions, he focuses on high-born characters and national affairs as the subject of tragedy. In most other respects, though, the early tragedies are far closer to the spirit and style of moralities. They are episodic, packed with character and incident; they are loosely unified by a theme or character. In this respect, they reflect clearly the influence of Marlowe, particularly of Tamburlaine. Even in his early work, however, Shakespeare generally shows more restraint than Marlowe; he resorts to grandiloquent rhetoric less frequently, and his attitude towards his heroes is more nuanced, and sometimes more sceptical, than Marlowe's. By the turn of the century, the bombast of Titus Andronicus had vanished, replaced by the subtlety of Hamlet.

In comedy, Shakespeare strayed even further from classical models. The Comedy of Errors, an adaptation of Plautus's Menaechmi, follows the model of new comedy closely. Shakespeare's other Elizabethan comedies are more romantic. Like Lyly, he often makes romantic intrigue (a secondary feature in Latin new comedy) the main plot element; even this romantic plot is sometimes given less attention than witty dialogue, deceit, and jests. The "reform of manners", which Horace considered the main function of comedy, survives in such episodes as the gulling of Malvolio.

== Jacobean Shakespeare ==
Shakespeare reached maturity as a dramatist at the end of Elizabeth's reign, and in the first years of the reign of James. In these years, he responded to a deep shift in popular tastes, both in subject matter and approach. At the turn of the decade, he responded to the vogue for dramatic satire initiated by the boy players at Blackfriars and St. Paul's. At the end of the decade, he seems to have attempted to capitalise on the new fashion for tragicomedy, even collaborating with John Fletcher, the writer who had popularised the genre in England.

The influence of younger dramatists such as John Marston and Ben Jonson is seen not only in the problem plays, which dramatise intractable human problems of greed and lust, but also in the darker tone of the Jacobean tragedies. The Marlovian, heroic mode of the Elizabethan tragedies is gone, replaced by a darker vision of heroic natures caught in environments of pervasive corruption. As a sharer in both the Globe and in the King's Men, Shakespeare never wrote for the boys' companies; however, his early Jacobean work is markedly influenced by the techniques of the new, satiric dramatists. One play, Troilus and Cressida, may even have been inspired by the War of the Theatres.

Shakespeare's final plays hark back to his Elizabethan comedies in their use of romantic situation and incident. In these plays, however, the sombre elements that are largely glossed over in the earlier plays are brought to the fore and often rendered dramatically vivid. This change is related to the success of tragicomedies such as Philaster, although the uncertainty of dates makes the nature and direction of the influence unclear. From the evidence of the title-page to The Two Noble Kinsmen and from textual analysis it is believed by some editors that Shakespeare ended his career in collaboration with Fletcher, who succeeded him as house playwright for the King's Men. These last plays resemble Fletcher's tragicomedies in their attempt to find a comedic mode capable of dramatising more serious events than had his earlier comedies.

== Style ==
During the reign of Queen Elizabeth, "drama became the ideal means to capture and convey the diverse interests of the time." Stories of various genres were enacted for audiences consisting of both the wealthy and educated and the poor and illiterate. Later on, he retired at the height of the Jacobean period, not long before the start of the Thirty Years' War. His verse style, his choice of subjects, and his stagecraft all bear the marks of both periods. His style changed not only in accordance with his own tastes and developing mastery, but also in accord with the tastes of the audiences for whom he wrote.

While many passages in Shakespeare's plays are written in prose, he almost always wrote a large proportion of his plays and poems in iambic pentameter. In some of his early works (like Romeo and Juliet), he even added punctuation at the end of these iambic pentameter lines to make the rhythm even stronger. He and many dramatists of this period used the form of blank verse extensively in character dialogue, thus heightening poetic effects.

To end many scenes in his plays he used a rhyming couplet to give a sense of conclusion, or completion. A typical example is provided in Macbeth: as Macbeth leaves the stage to murder Duncan (to the sound of a chiming clock), he says,

Hear it not Duncan, for it is a knell
That summons thee to heaven or to hell.

Shakespeare's writing (especially his plays) also feature extensive wordplay in which double entendres and rhetorical flourishes are repeatedly used. Humour is a key element in all of Shakespeare's plays. Although a large amount of his comical talent is evident in his comedies, some of the most entertaining scenes and characters are found in tragedies such as Hamlet and histories such as Henry IV, Part 1. Shakespeare's humour was largely influenced by Plautus.

=== Soliloquies in plays ===
Shakespeare's plays are also notable for their use of soliloquies, in which a character, apparently alone within the context of the play, makes a speech so that the audience may understand the character's inner motivations and conflict.

In his book Shakespeare and the History of Soliloquies, James Hirsh defines the convention of a Shakespearean soliloquy in early modern drama. He argues that when a person on the stage speaks to himself or herself, they are characters in a fiction speaking in character; this is an occasion of self-address. Furthermore, Hirsh points out that Shakespearean soliloquies and "asides" are audible in the fiction of the play, bound to be overheard by any other character in the scene unless certain elements confirm that the speech is protected. Therefore, a Renaissance playgoer who was familiar with this dramatic convention would have been alert to Hamlet's expectation that his soliloquy be overheard by the other characters in the scene. Moreover, Hirsh asserts that in soliloquies in other Shakespearean plays, the speaker is entirely in character within the play's fiction. Saying that addressing the audience was outmoded by the time Shakespeare was alive, he "acknowledges few occasions when a Shakespearean speech might involve the audience in recognising the simultaneous reality of the stage and the world the stage is representing". Other than 29 speeches delivered by choruses or characters who revert to that condition as epilogues "Hirsh recognizes only three instances of audience address in Shakespeare's plays, 'all in very early comedies, in which audience address is introduced specifically to ridicule the practice as antiquated and amateurish.'"

== Source material of the plays ==
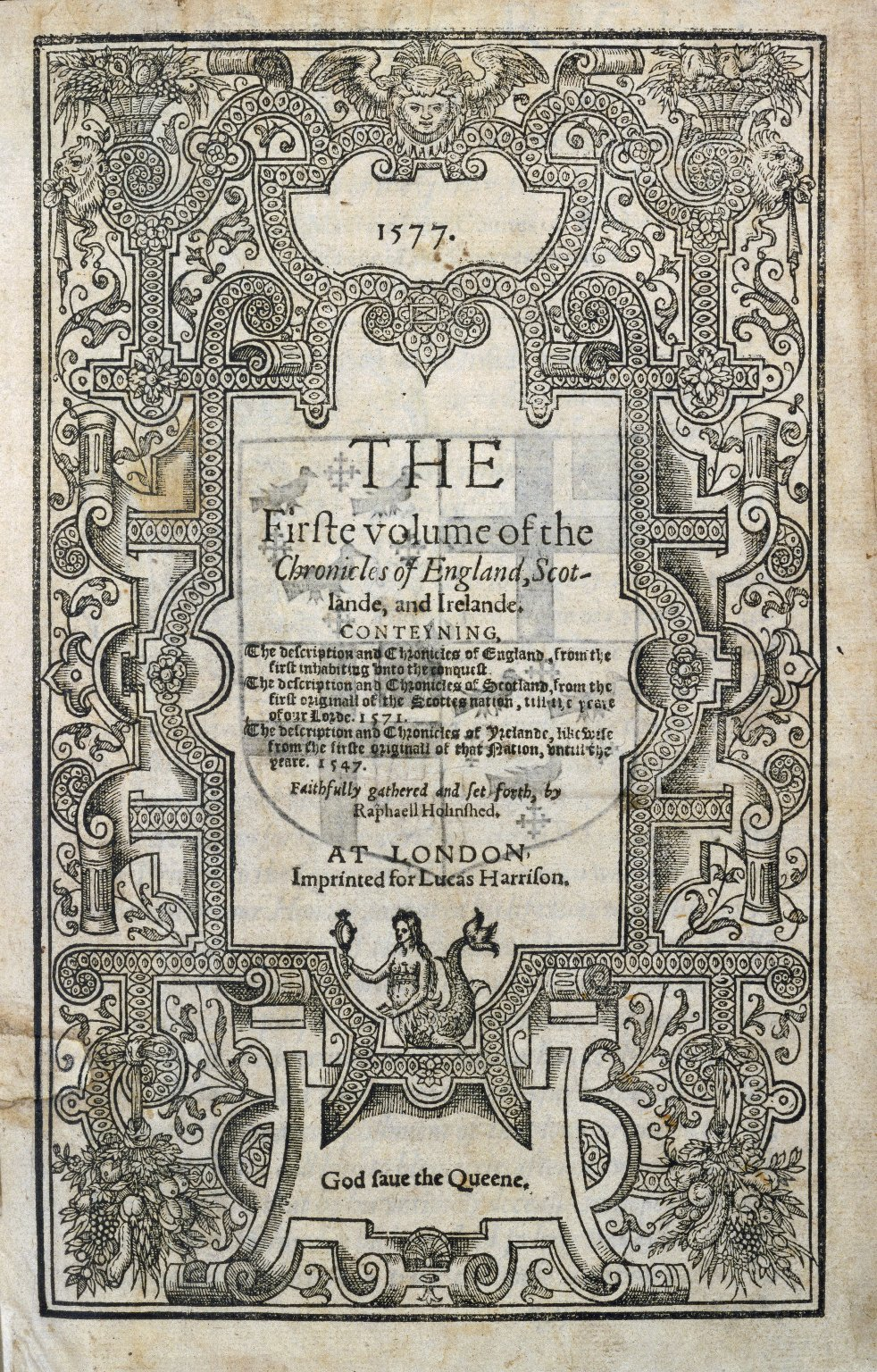
First edition of Raphael Holinshed's Chronicles of England, Scotlande, and Irelande, printed 1577

As was common in the period, Shakespeare based many of his plays on the work of other playwrights and recycled older stories and historical material. His dependence on earlier sources was a natural consequence of the speed at which playwrights of his era wrote; in addition, plays based on already popular stories appear to have been seen as more likely to draw large crowds.

There were also aesthetic reasons: Renaissance aesthetic theory took seriously the dictum that tragic plots should be grounded in history. For example, King Lear is probably an adaptation of an older play, King Leir, and the Henriad probably derived from The Famous Victories of Henry V.

There is speculation that Hamlet (c. 1601) may be a reworking of an older, lost play (the so-called Ur-Hamlet), but the number of lost plays from this time period makes it impossible to determine that relationship with certainty. (The Ur-Hamlet may in fact have been Shakespeare's, and was just an earlier and subsequently discarded version.)

For plays on historical subjects, Shakespeare relied heavily on two principal texts. Most of the Roman and Greek plays are based on Plutarch's Parallel Lives (from the 1579 English translation by Sir Thomas North), and the English history plays are indebted to Raphael Holinshed's 1587 Chronicles.

This structure did not apply to comedy, and those of Shakespeare's plays for which no clear source has been established, such as Love's Labour's Lost and The Tempest, are comedies. Even these plays, however, rely heavily on generic commonplaces.

While there is much dispute about the exact chronology of Shakespeare's plays, there is a general consensus that stylistic groupings largely reflect a chronology of three phases:

1. Histories and comedies – Shakespeare's earliest plays tended to be adaptations of other playwrights' works and employed blank verse and little variation in rhythm. However, after the plague forced Shakespeare and his company of actors to leave London for periods between 1592 and 1594, Shakespeare began to use rhymed couplets in his plays, along with more dramatic dialogue. These elements showed up in The Taming of the Shrew and A Midsummer Night's Dream. Almost all of the plays written after the plague hit London are comedies, perhaps reflecting the public's desire at the time for light-hearted fare. Other comedies from Shakespeare during this period include Much Ado About Nothing, The Merry Wives of Windsor and As You Like It.
2. Tragedies – Beginning in 1599 with Julius Caesar, for the next few years, Shakespeare would produce his most famous dramas, including Macbeth, Hamlet, and King Lear. The plays of this period address issues such as betrayal, murder, lust, power and egoism.
3. Late romances – These plays, including Pericles, Prince of Tyre, Cymbeline, The Winter's Tale and The Tempest, are so called because they bear similarities to medieval romance literature. Among the features of these plays are a redemptive plotline with a happy ending, and magic and other fantastic elements.

== Canonical plays ==
With three exceptions explicitly labelled ^{~~FF~~} and absent from the original, the plays listed below are ordered as in the First Folio of 1623, ^{LR} marking late romances, and ^{PP} denoting problem plays:

=== Comedies ===
1. The Tempest ^{LR}
2. The Two Gentlemen of Verona
3. The Merry Wives of Windsor
4. Measure for Measure ^{PP}
5. The Comedy of Errors
6. Much Ado About Nothing
7. Love's Labour's Lost
8. A Midsummer Night's Dream
9. The Merchant of Venice ^{PP}
10. As You Like It
11. The Taming of the Shrew
12. All's Well That Ends Well ^{PP}
13. Twelfth Night
14. The Winter's Tale ^{LR} ^{PP}
15. Pericles, Prince of Tyre ^{LR} ^{~~FF~~}
16. The Two Noble Kinsmen ^{LR} ^{~~FF~~}

=== Histories ===
1. King John
2. Richard II
3. Henry IV, Part 1
4. Henry IV, Part 2
5. Henry V
6. Henry VI, Part 1
7. Henry VI, Part 2
8. Henry VI, Part 3
9. Richard III
10. Henry VIII
11. Edward III ^{~~FF~~}

=== Tragedies ===
1. Troilus and Cressida ^{PP}
2. Coriolanus
3. Titus Andronicus
4. Romeo and Juliet
5. Timon of Athens ^{PP}
6. Julius Caesar
7. Macbeth
8. Hamlet
9. King Lear
10. Othello
11. Antony and Cleopatra
12. Cymbeline ^{LR}

All histories and tragedies, along with one of his comedies (Pericles), bear their main characters' first names. All histories and a quarter of his tragedies (Macbeth, King Lear, Cymbeline) bear the name of British rulers, while one of the comedies (Wives of Windsor) shares a character in common with his Henriad. A third of the tragedies (Titus, Coriolanus, Julius Caesar, Antony and Cleopatra) bear the name of ancient Roman rulers, while one of his comedies (Pericles), along with its protagonist, are named after a Greek hero. Save for its last installment, the historical section is arranged chronologically, insofar Edward III would have otherwise occupied the second position, being relegated to the end mainly due to authorship issues; similarly for the last two comedies enumerated above. But for a handful, most of his plays take place in or around Italy and the British isles, or are related to classical antiquity and the matter of Rome.

== Dramatic collaborations ==
Like most playwrights of his period, Shakespeare did not always write alone, and a number of his plays were collaborative, although the exact number is open to debate. Some of the following attributions, such as for The Two Noble Kinsmen, have well-attested contemporary documentation; others, such as for Titus Andronicus, remain more controversial and are dependent on linguistic analysis by modern scholars.

- Cardenio (a lost play or one that survives only as a later adaptation, Double Falsehood) – Contemporaneous reports suggest that Shakespeare collaborated with John Fletcher.
- Cymbeline – The Yale Shakespeare suggests that a collaborator may have been responsible for parts or all of act III, scene 7, and act V, scene 2
- Edward III – Brian Vickers concluded that the play was 40% Shakespeare and 60% Thomas Kyd.
- Henry VI, Part 1 – Some scholars argue that Shakespeare wrote less than 20% of the text.
- Henry VIII – Generally considered a collaboration between Shakespeare and Fletcher.
- Macbeth – Thomas Middleton may have revised this tragedy in 1615 to incorporate extra musical sequences.
- Measure for Measure – May have undergone a light revision by Middleton.
- Pericles, Prince of Tyre – May include work by George Wilkins, either as collaborator, reviser, or revisee.
- Timon of Athens – May have resulted from collaboration between Shakespeare and Middleton.
- Titus Andronicus – May have been written in collaboration with or revised by George Peele.
- The Two Noble Kinsmen – Attributed in 1634 to Fletcher and Shakespeare.

== Lost plays ==
- Love's Labour's Won – A late sixteenth-century writer, Francis Meres, and a bookseller's list both include this title among Shakespeare's recent works, but no play of this title has survived. It may have become lost, or it may represent an alternative title of one of the plays listed above, such as Much Ado About Nothing or All's Well That Ends Well.
- Cardenio – Attributed to William Shakespeare and John Fletcher in a Stationers' Register entry of 1653 (alongside a number of erroneous attributions), and often believed to have been re-worked from a subplot in Cervantes' Don Quixote. In 1727, Lewis Theobald produced a play he called Double Falshood, which he claimed to have adapted from three manuscripts of a lost play by Shakespeare that he did not name. Double Falshood does re-work the Cardenio story, but modern scholarship has not established with certainty whether Double Falshood includes fragments of Shakespeare's lost play.

== Plays possibly by Shakespeare ==
Note: For a comprehensive account of plays possibly by Shakespeare or in part by Shakespeare, see the separate entry on the Shakespeare apocrypha.

- Arden of Faversham – The middle portion of the play (scenes 4–9) may have been written by Shakespeare.
- Edmund Ironside – Contains numerous words first used by Shakespeare, and, if by him, is perhaps his first play.
- The London Prodigal and A Yorkshire Tragedy – Both plays were published in quarto as works of Shakespeare, in 1605 and 1608, and were included in the Third Folio. However, stylistic analysis considers these attributions unlikely.
- Sir Thomas More – A collaborative work by several playwrights, including Shakespeare. There is a "growing scholarly consensus" that Shakespeare was called in to re-write a contentious scene in the play and that "Hand D" in the surviving manuscript is that of Shakespeare himself.
- The Spanish Tragedy – Additional passages included in the fourth quarto, including the "painter scene", are likely to have been written by him.

== Performance history ==
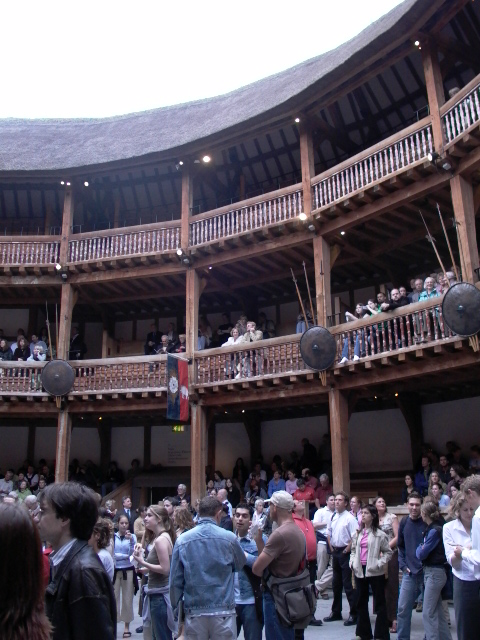
The modern reconstruction of the Globe Theatre, in London

During Shakespeare's lifetime, many of his greatest plays were staged at the Globe Theatre and the Blackfriars Theatre. Shakespeare's fellow members of the Lord Chamberlain's Men acted in his plays. Among these actors were Richard Burbage (who played the title role in the first performances of many of Shakespeare's plays, including Hamlet, Othello, Richard III and King Lear), Richard Cowley (who played Verges in Much Ado About Nothing), William Kempe, (who played Peter in Romeo and Juliet and, possibly, Bottom in A Midsummer Night's Dream) and Henry Condell and John Heminges, who are most famous now for collecting and editing the plays of Shakespeare's First Folio (1623).

Shakespeare's plays continued to be staged after his death until the Interregnum (1649–1660), when all public stage performances were banned by the Puritan rulers. After the English Restoration, Shakespeare's plays were performed in playhouses with elaborate scenery and staged with music, dancing, thunder, lightning, wave machines, and fireworks. During this time the texts were "reformed" and "improved" for the stage, an undertaking which has seemed shockingly disrespectful to posterity.

Victorian productions of Shakespeare often sought pictorial effects in "authentic" historical costumes and sets. The staging of the reported sea fights and barge scene in Antony and Cleopatra was one spectacular example. Too often, the result was a loss of pace. Towards the end of the 19th century, William Poel led a reaction against this heavy style. In a series of "Elizabethan" productions on a thrust stage, he paid fresh attention to the structure of the drama. In the early twentieth century, Harley Granville-Barker directed quarto and folio texts with few cuts, while Edward Gordon Craig and others called for abstract staging. Both approaches have influenced the variety of Shakespearean production styles seen today.

== Censorship ==
In 1642 England's Parliament banned plays, including Shakespeare's, accusing the theatre of promoting "lascivious mirth and levity." In 1660, after the Commonwealth of England ended with the death of Oliver Cromwell, theatre resumed in a limited way.

== See also ==
- Chronology of Shakespeare's plays
- Locations of Shakespeare's plays
- Elizabethan era
- List of Shakespearean characters
- Music in the plays of William Shakespeare
- List of William Shakespeare screen adaptations
- Shakespeare's late romances
- Returning to Shakespeare by Brian Vickers
- The Complete Works of William Shakespeare (Abridged)
