= Shakespearean comedy =

William Shakespeare's comedic plays

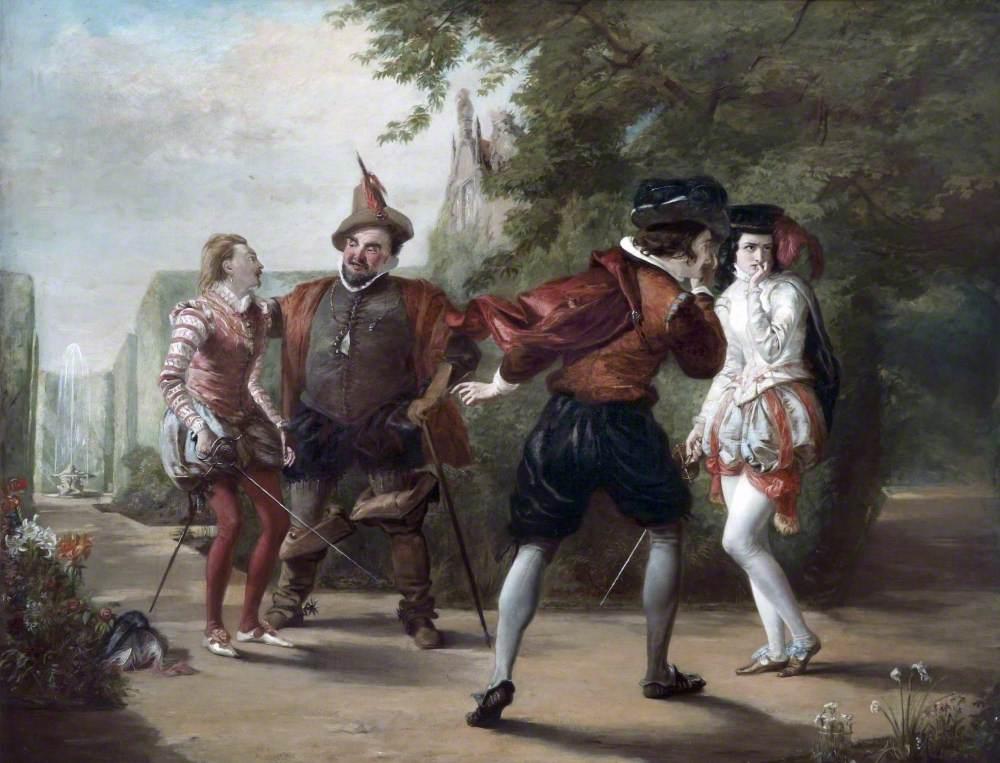
The Duel Scene from 'Twelfth Night' by William Shakespeare, William Powell Frith (1842)

In the First Folio, the plays of William Shakespeare were grouped into three categories: comedies, histories, and tragedies; and modern scholars recognise a fourth category, romance, to describe the specific types of comedy that appear in Shakespeare's later works.

== Plays ==
This alphabetical list includes:

- everything listed as a comedy in the First Folio of 1623;
- one play (Cymbeline) widely regarded as a comedy but listed among the tragedies in the First Folio; and
- the two quarto comedies (The Two Noble Kinsmen and Pericles, Prince of Tyre) which are not included in the Folio but generally recognised to be Shakespeare's own.

Late romances and problem plays are marked accordingly.

- All's Well That Ends Well ^{PP}
- As You Like It
- The Comedy of Errors
- Cymbeline ^{LR}
- Love's Labour's Lost
- Measure for Measure ^{PP}
- The Merchant of Venice ^{PP}
- The Merry Wives of Windsor
- A Midsummer Night's Dream
- Much Ado About Nothing
- Pericles, Prince of Tyre ^{LR}
- The Taming of the Shrew
- The Tempest ^{LR}
- Twelfth Night
- The Two Gentlemen of Verona
- The Two Noble Kinsmen ^{LR}
- The Winter's Tale ^{PP}

== Bibliography ==
- Bates, Catherine (2006). "Love and Courtship". In Leggatt, Alexander (ed.). The Cambridge Companion to Shakespearean Comedy. Cambridge Companions to Literature. Cambridge: Cambridge University Press. pp. 102–122. doi:10.1017/CCOL0521770440.007. ISBN 978-0511998577 – via Cambridge Core.
- O'Connell, Michael (2006). "The Experiment of Romance". In Leggatt, Alexander (ed.). The Cambridge Companion to Shakespearean Comedy. Cambridge Companions to Literature. Cambridge: Cambridge University Press. pp. 215–229. doi:10.1017/CCOL0521770440.013. ISBN 978-0511998577 – via Cambridge Core.
- Wells, Stanley (2011). "Shakespeare's Comedies". In de Grazia, Margreta; Wells, Stanley (eds.). The New Cambridge Companion to Shakespeare. Cambridge Companions to Literature. Cambridge: Cambridge University Press. pp. 105–120. ISBN 978-1139002868 – via Cambridge Core.
