= World Shakespeare Bibliography =

Online Shakespeare database

World Shakespeare Bibliography Online
- Producer: Johns Hopkins University Press for Shakespeare Quarterly in association with the Folger Shakespeare Library (United States)
- History: 2001 to present
- Languages: English

Access
- Cost: Subscription

Coverage
- Disciplines: Literature, Shakespeare
- Record depth: Index
- Format coverage: Books, articles, book reviews, dissertations, theatrical productions, reviews of productions, audiovisual materials, electronic media
- Geospatial coverage: Worldwide
- Update frequency: Quarterly

Print edition
- Print title: World Shakespeare Bibliography
- ISSN: 1538-3555

Links
- Website: www.worldshakesbib.org

World Shakespeare Bibliography Online is a searchable electronic database consisting of the most comprehensive record of Shakespeare-related scholarship and theatrical productions published or produced worldwide between 1960 and the present. Containing over 146,000 annotated entries, this collected information provides annotated citations for anyone engaged in research on William Shakespeare or Early Modern Britain. It is the single-largest Shakespeare database in the world.

In 2001, the Chartered Institute of Library and Information Professionals (CILIP) awarded the WSB Online the Besterman/McColvin medal for outstanding electronic reference work. In 2006, this ever-expanding digital reference tool, compiled by Dr. James Harner of Texas A&M University, was named as an Outstanding Academic Title by Choice Magazine. The World Shakespeare Bibliography Online is currently edited by Dr. Heidi Craig (also of Texas A&M University).

WSB Online is searchable by author, title, subject, keyword, date, language, publisher, and periodical title. It is international in scope, covering and representing every country in North America, South America, and Europe, and nearly every country in Africa, Asia, and Oceania.
