= Shakespeare's late romances =

Category of Shakespeare's plays

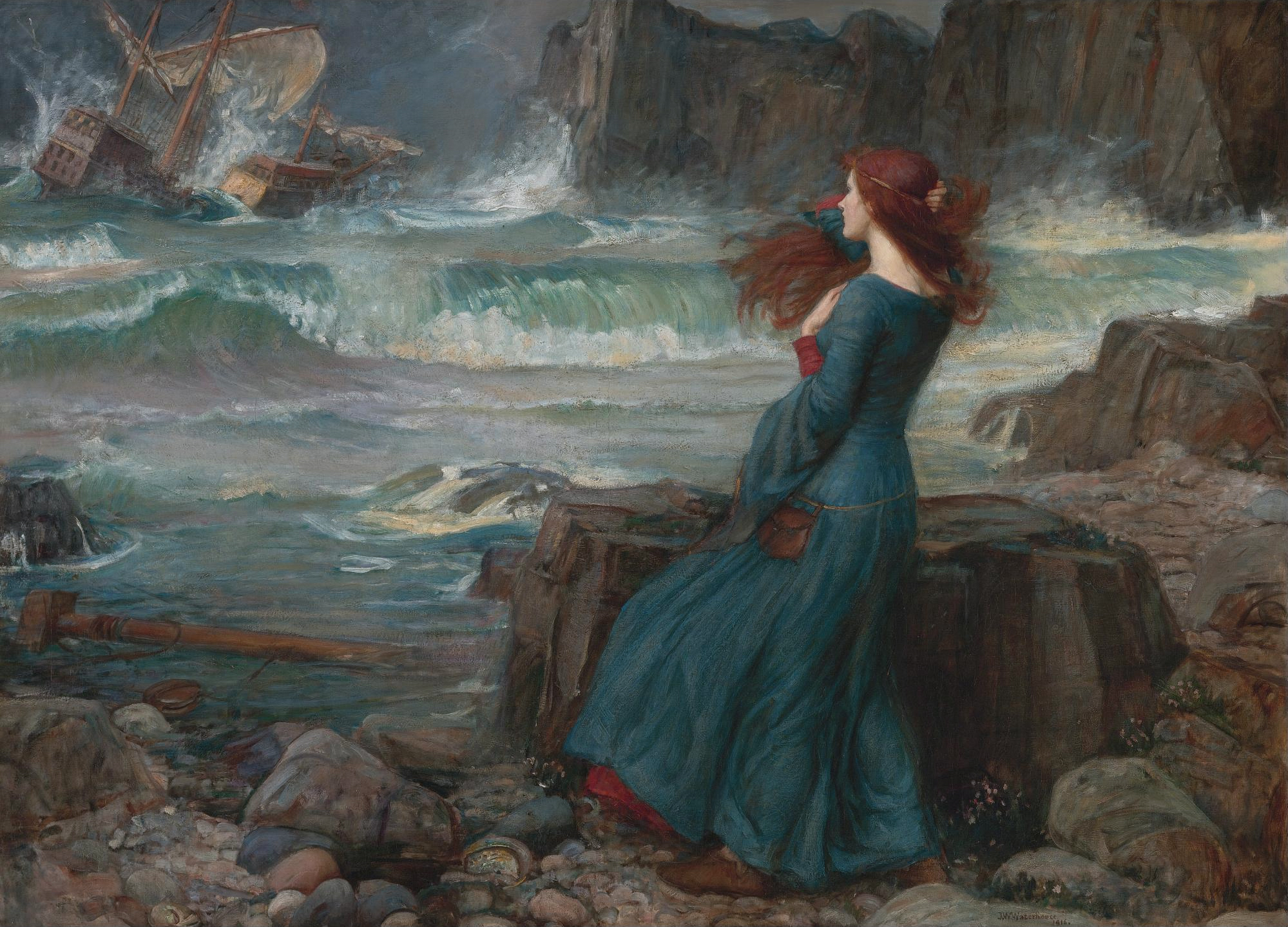
Miranda in The Tempest by John William Waterhouse (1916)

The late romances, often simply called the romances, are a grouping of William Shakespeare's last plays, comprising Pericles, Prince of Tyre; Cymbeline; The Winter's Tale; and The Tempest. The Two Noble Kinsmen, of which Shakespeare was co-author, is sometimes also included in the grouping. The term "romances" was first used for these late works in Edward Dowden's Shakspere (1877). Later writers have generally been content to adopt Dowden's term.

Shakespeare's plays cannot be precisely dated, but it is generally agreed that these comedies followed a series of tragedies including Othello, King Lear and Macbeth. Shakespeare wrote tragedies because their productions were financially successful, but he returned to comedy towards the end of his career, mixing it with tragic and mystical elements. Shakespeare's late romances were also influenced by the development of tragicomedy and the extreme elaboration of the courtly masque as staged by Ben Jonson and Inigo Jones. The subjects and style of these plays were also influenced by the preference of the monarch, by Shakespeare's ageing company and by their more upper class audiences.

The romances call for spectacular effects to be shown onstage, including storms at sea, opulent interior and exterior scenery, dream settings and the illusion of time passing. Scholars have argued that the late plays deal with faith and redemption, and are variations on themes of rewarding virtue over vice.

== Plays ==
Shakespeare's late romances are:

- Pericles, Prince of Tyre, ca. 1603–08
- Cymbeline, ca. 1608–10
- The Winter's Tale, ca. 1609–11
- The Tempest, ca. 1603–11
- The Two Noble Kinsmen, ca. 1612–14 (co-written with John Fletcher)

Sources: F E Halliday (1964), A L Rowse (1978) and Stanley Wells (1986) (Note: See also Hallett Smith on the "many links between this and the previous plays...")

The Norton Shakespeare describes Henry VIII (ca. 1612–13) as being characteristic of the late romances, but still considers it one of the histories, as does Rowse.

== Labelling and structure ==
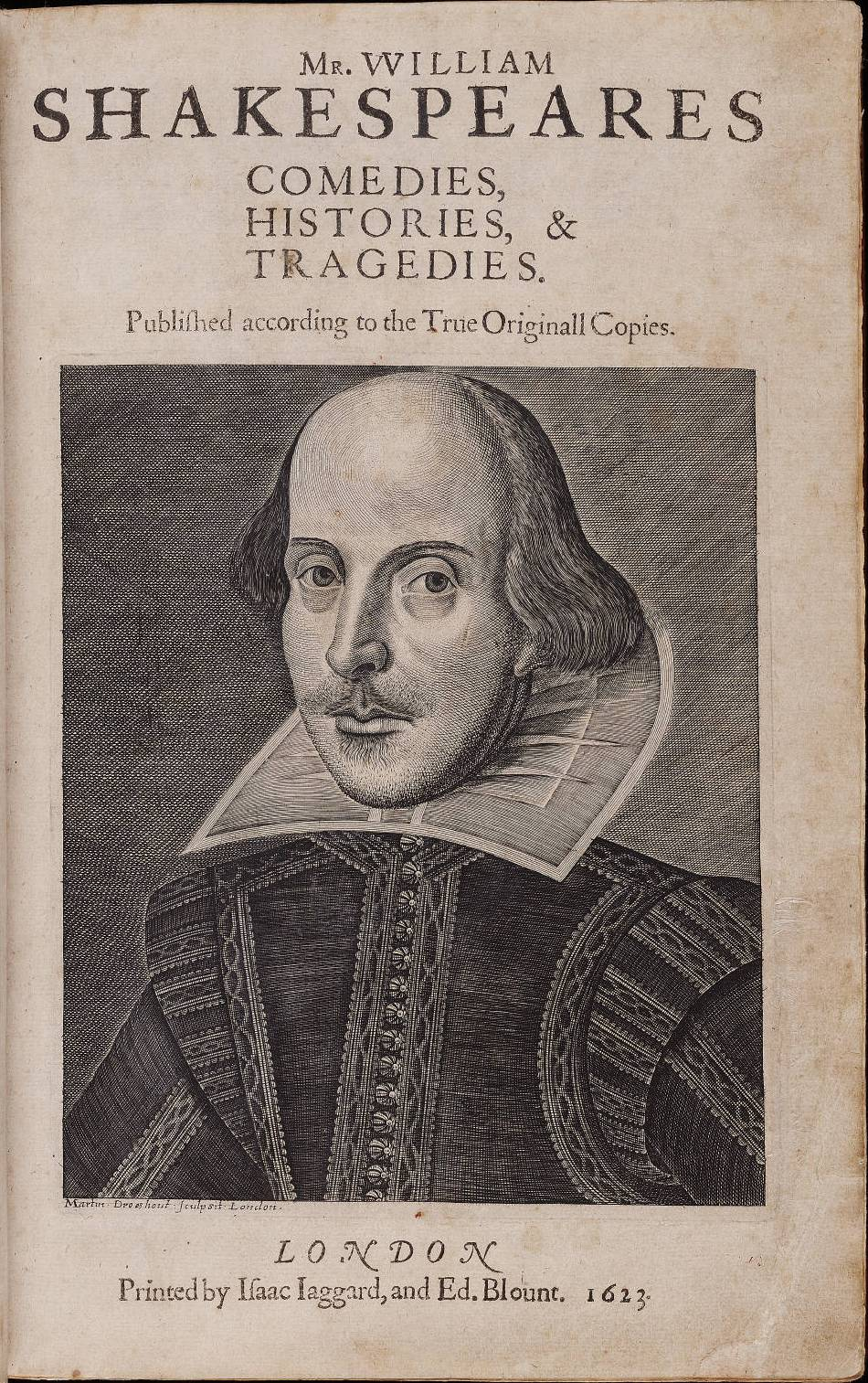
Title page of the First Folio (1623)

The category of Shakespearean romance arises from a desire among critics for the late plays to be recognised as a more complex kind of comedy; the labels of romance and tragicomedy are preferred by the majority of modern critics and editors. In the First Folio of 1623, John Heminges and Henry Condell, its editors, listed The Tempest and The Winter's Tale as comedies, and Cymbeline as a tragedy. Pericles did not appear in it at all. In 1875, when Dowden argued that Shakespeare's late comedies should be called "romances", he did so because they resemble late medieval and early modern "romances", a genre in which stories were set across the immensity of space and time. The romances have grand plot points which are combined with humour, dramatic action and internal struggles. They also feature broader characters, larger spectacles and a different handling of the themes of appearance and reality. The late romances differed from early Shakespearean comedies by relying on grand themes, rather than specific moments. The romances are Shakespearean tragedies that end happily, instead of a moment of danger that moves rapidly to a solution. They also focus on the relationships between father and daughter.

== Defining characteristics ==
The final plays share some common traits:

- Tragic or potentially tragic elements at the beginning of the play that are then resolved by the end, such as Leontes's jealousy in The Winter's Tale, or the shipwreck and drownings in The Tempest;
- Older men are more prominently featured;
- Young lovers are a part of each play, but are not central to the plot;
- A redemptive plotline with a happy ending reuniting long-separated family members;
- Magic and other fantastical elements;
- The presence of pre-Christian, masque-like figures, like Jupiter in Cymbeline and the goddesses whom Prospero summons in The Tempest;
- A mixture of "courtly" and "pastoral" scenes (such as the gentry and the island residents in The Tempest and the pastoral and courtly contrasts of The Winter's Tale).

== Tragicomic influence ==
Shakespeare's romances were also influenced by two major developments in theatre in the early years of the seventeenth century. The first was the innovation of tragicomedy initiated by John Fletcher and developed in the early Beaumont and Fletcher collaborations. Tragicomedies made a pretence at "grave stuff" but invariably provided a happy ending with light entertainment. Shakespeare's romances are more sharply tragicomic than his comedies: threats of death and scenes of suffering are more acute. Encounters with the supernatural are also more direct and emphatic. The other influence was the extreme elaboration of the courtly masque being stage in the same period by Ben Jonson and Inigo Jones. (Note: See: The Masque of Blackness; The Masque of Queens.) Key scenes in the late romances are closely related to court masques: They embrace the visual magnificence but also the shallowness of such a display.

== History ==
The popular drama during the Renaissance was subject to external influences, specifically what the ruler wanted to see. Elizabeth I enjoyed watching what the people liked, which were the tragedies. Elizabeth reigned until her death in 1603. James I succeeded her, and he preferred the romances.

Shakespeare's health was impaired, and he died about five years after The Tempest, the last play he wrote by himself. The shift indicates that he was giving up composition. He retired to Stratford following completion of his final play. The scholar Catherine Alexander has suggested that the plays were not specifically autobiographical in respect of Shakespeare's advancing old age, but reflected the fact that the actors themselves were older. The King's Men occupied a second playhouse, the Blackfriars, which had been out of use for several years. The playhouse had been shut down because of objections by local residents, but was reopened during the second half of 1608. In the interim the actors had aged, and Shakespeare adjusted the age of his characters.

The King's Men were allowed to change their name from the Lord Chamberlain's Men in 1603, when James I came to the throne. They would put on as many as two new plays a week. Many plays had only a few performances, and there was no director: actors were expected to know fairly standard blocking patterns. Audiences at the Blackfriars were generally upper class, as the cost of admission was so high that the lower classes were unlikely to attend many performances. Because of the sophistication of the audience, the romances leaned more toward aesthetics and culture.

== Performances ==
Henry Irving and Ellen Terry in Irving's elaborate 1896 production of Cymbeline

The romances create challenges for directors, as they require spectacular effects to be shown onstage. For Pericles, in 1854, Samuel Phelps created the effect of a storm by using rowers manning oars to carry Pericles from one location to another while a panorama moved behind them to create the illusion of travel. Cymbeline often offers two different directions for staging: grand and simple. In the spring of 1896, Henry Irving staged the play at the Lyceum Theatre, London with elaborate Celtic sets for Cymbeline's palace gardens and interior rooms, a Roman banqueting hall for Posthumus's visit to Rome, a handsomely decorated bedchamber for Imogen, and a spectacular dream setting for the descent of Jupiter. Ben Greet at The Old Vic in 1918, on the other hand, chose a simple, Elizabethan approach. The Winter's Tale poses the challenges of time passing and a bear pursuing Antigonus off stage. In 1976, Trevor Nunn and John Barton cast John Nettles as both Time and the bear. At Stratford-upon-Avon in 1986, Terry Hands used a bearskin rug, which rose off the ground to chase Antigonus off.

The Tempest opens with a scene inspired by the shipwreck of Sea Venture in 1609. This scene has allowed for different stagings, from William Charles Macready in 1842 at Covent Garden featuring a huge sea vessel, fully rigged and manned, to Robert Falls's production at the Goodman Theatre in 1987, where the scene was set on a cruiseship, with tourist passengers in deck chairs or playing shuffleboard until disaster struck.

== Criticism ==
Because of the shift in style, as well as Shakespeare's physical state, there has been much debate about why the late plays were written as they were. Dowden created a biographical view that suggested that Shakespeare was suffering from depression when he wrote his tragedies, and had worked his way out of it to create the romances. Sir Edmund Chambers suggested that he suffered a breakdown while writing Timon of Athens, and the romances reflect a kind of psychological convalescence. Clifford Leech viewed the romances as infected with a kind of fantastical puritanism that came from Shakespeare's personal revulsion from sex. D G James believed that Shakespeare ran out of poetic energy as he got older. Raphael Lyne comments that it is impossible to show that Shakespeare managed his career to this extent, and there is no pressing need to consider these works as anything other than coincidentally "late". There is a belief among some scholars that the late plays deal with faith and redemption, and are variations on themes of rewarding virtue over vice.

G. Wilson Knight was among those critics to argue that the late romances embody, together with the high tragedies or even above them, Shakespeare's greatest achievement. Harold Bloom says of The Winter's Tale that in it Shakespeare returns to his full talent and genius with full force.

== Film adaptations ==
A film version of Cymbeline was released in 2014, starring Milla Jovovich, Ethan Hawke, Penn Badgley, John Leguizamo and Ed Harris.

The Tempest has been adapted most often. A silent film version was made in 1908. Later adaptations include, Yellow Sky (1948) – set in the wild west, with Gregory Peck and Anne Baxter; Forbidden Planet (1956) – a science fiction classic set in outer space; Derek Jarman's 1979 version relocated to a crumbling mansion off the Scottish coast; Tempest (1982) – set on a Greek isle, with John Cassavetes, Molly Ringwald, Gena Rowlands and Susan Sarandon; Prospero's Books (1991) starring John Gielgud – which is not so much an adaptation as a reading of the play, combining film, dance, opera, and animation; and a 2010 version with Prospero recast as Prospera, played by Helen Mirren.

== See also ==
- Shakespearean problem play

== Notes, references and sources ==
=== Sources ===
- Adams, Joseph Quincy (1923). A Life of Shakespeare. Cambridge: Riverside Press. OCLC 1070329.
- Alexander, Catherine M. S., ed. (2009). The Cambridge Companion to Shakespeare's Last Plays. Cambridge University Press. ISBN 978-0-521-88178-4.
- Bevington, David (2007). This Wide and Universal Theater: Shakespeare in Performance: Then and Now. Chicago: University of Chicago Press. ISBN 978-0-226-04478-1.
- Bieman, Elizabeth (1990). William Shakespeare: The Romances. Boston: Twayne. ISBN 978-0-8057-6995-1.
- Dowden, Edward (1877). Shakspere. London: Macmillan and Co.
- Greenblatt, Stephen, ed. (2008). The Norton Shakespeare. New York: Norton. ISBN 978-0-393-92991-1.
- Halliday, F E (1964). A Shakespeare Companion, 1564-1964. New York: Schocken Books. OCLC 359916.
- Hildy, Oscar G; Brockett, Franklin J (2007). History of the Theatre. Boston: Allyn and Bacon. ISBN 978-0-205-47360-1.
- Lyne, Raphael (2007). Shakespeare's Late Work. Oxford: Oxford University Press. ISBN 978-0-19-926595-4.
- Rowse, A L (1978). The Annotated Shakespeare Volume II. London: Orbis. ISBN 978-0-85613-086-1.
- Rowse, A L (1978). The Annotated Shakespeare Volume III. London: Orbis. ISBN 978-0-85613-087-8.
- Schmidgall, Gary (1981). Shakespeare and the Courtly Aesthetic. Berkeley: University of California Press. ISBN 978-0-520-04130-1.
- Thorne, Alison (2003). Shakespeare's Romances. Basingstoke and New York: Palgrave Macmillan. ISBN 978-0-333-67974-6.
- Wells, Stanley (1986). The Cambridge Companion to Shakespeare Studies. Cambridge and New York: Cambridge University Press. ISBN 978-0-521-26737-3.

=== Further reading ===
- Evans, G. Blakemore (1974). The Riverside Shakespeare. Boston: Houghton Mifflin. ISBN 978-0-395-04402-5.
