= Shakespeare's Globe =

Theatre in London, England

- The Globe
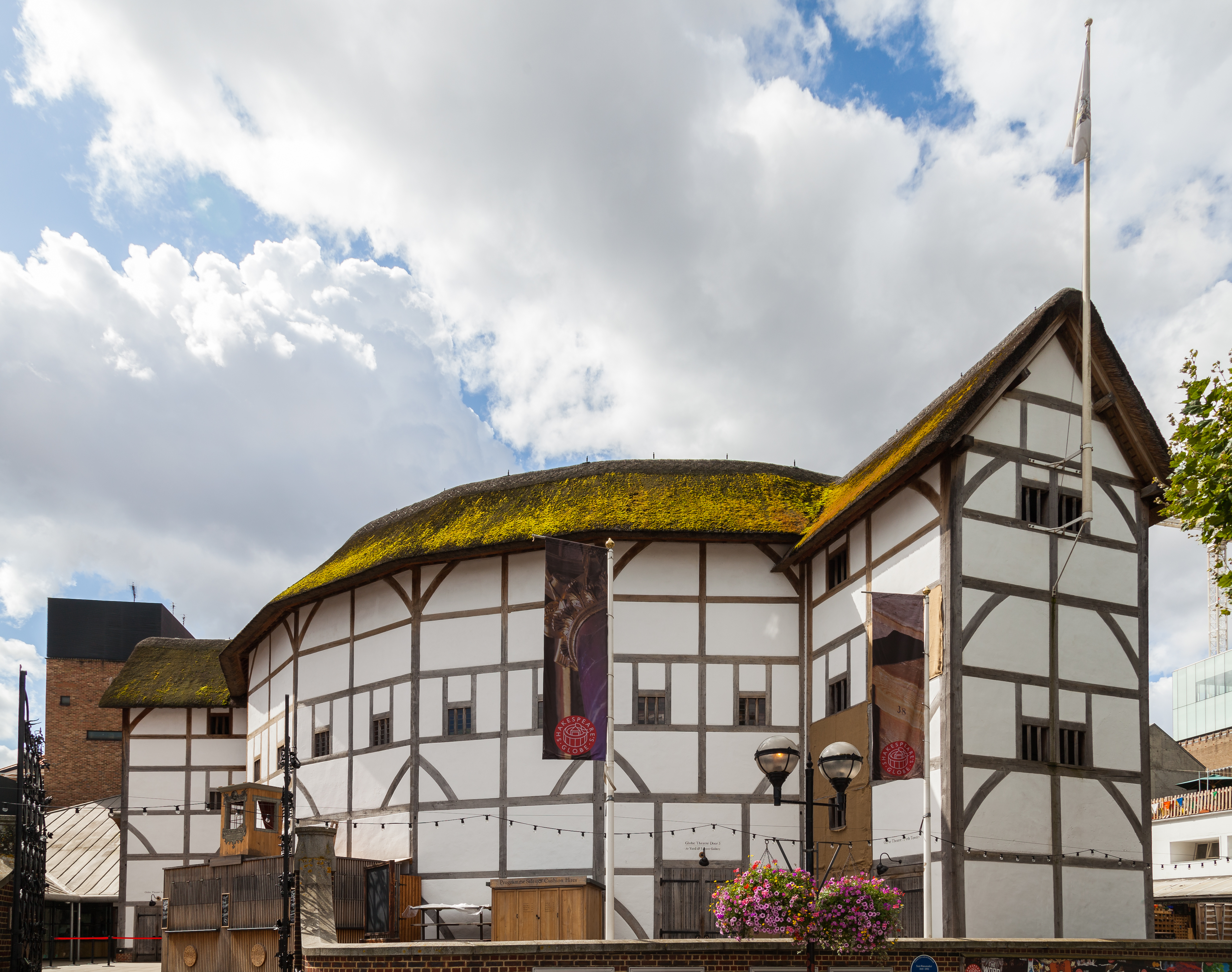
- Shakespeare's Globe in August 2014

- Location within London Borough of Southwark
- Address: New Globe Walk; London, SE1 9DT; United Kingdom
- Coordinates: 51°30′29″N 0°5′50″W
- Owner: The Shakespeare Globe Trust
- Public transit: Blackfriars Mansion House London Bridge

Construction
- Opened: June 1997
- Years active: 1997–present
- Architect: Pentagram

Website
- shakespearesglobe.com

Shakespeare's Globe is a reconstruction of the Globe Theatre, an Elizabethan playhouse first built in 1599 for which William Shakespeare wrote his plays. Like the original, it is located on the south bank of the River Thames, in Southwark, London. The reconstruction was completed in 1997 and the theatre's official opening was attended by Queen Elizabeth II.

While concentrating on Shakespeare's work, the theatre also hosts a variety of other theatrical productions in the summer months. Part of the Globe's complex also hosts the Sam Wanamaker Playhouse for smaller, indoor productions, in a setting which also recalls the period.

== Background ==
The original globe theatre was built in 1599 by the Lord Chamberlain's Men, destroyed by a fire in 1613, rebuilt in 1614, and then demolished in 1644. The modern Globe Theatre is an academic approximation based on available evidence of the 1599 and 1614 buildings. It is considered quite realistic, though modern safety requirements mean that it accommodates only 1,400 spectators compared to the original theatre's 3,000.

The modern Shakespeare's Globe was founded by the actor and director Sam Wanamaker, and built about 230 metres (750 ft) from the site of the original theatre in the historic open-air style. It opened to the public in 1997, with a production of Henry V.

Michelle Terry currently serves as artistic director. She is the second actor-manager in charge of the organisation, following Mark Rylance, the founding artistic director.

The site also includes the Sam Wanamaker Playhouse, an indoor theatre which opened in January 2014. This is a smaller, candle-lit space based on historic plans for an indoor playhouse of Jacobean era London (possibly Blackfriars Theatre).

The Shakespeare's Globe Studios, an educational and rehearsal studio complex, is situated just around the corner from the main site.

== Planning and construction ==
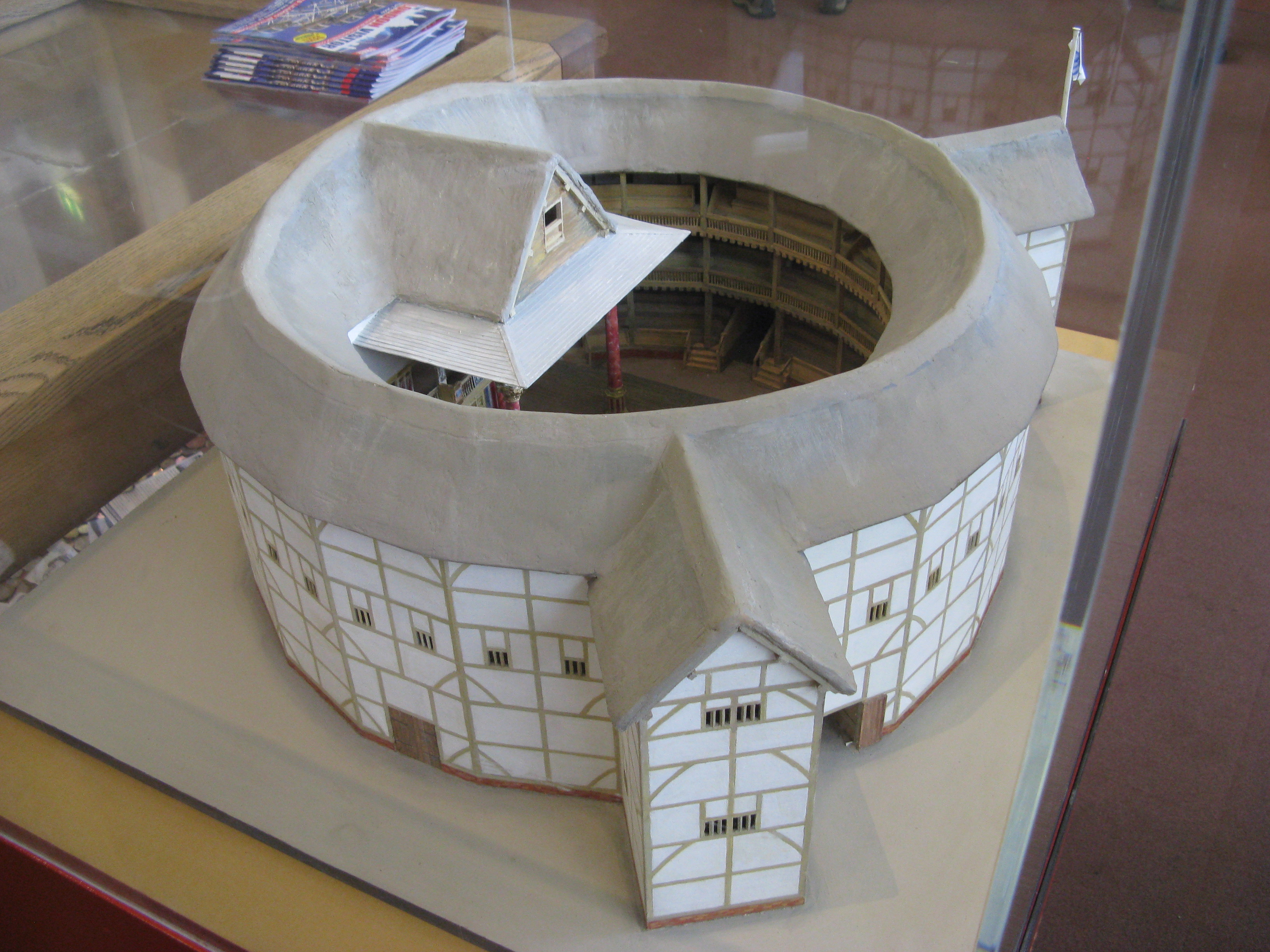
Model of Shakespeare's Globe

In 1970, American actor and director Sam Wanamaker, who had emigrated to London in the 1950s, founded the Shakespeare Globe Trust and the International Shakespeare Globe Centre, with the objective of building a faithful recreation of Shakespeare's Globe close to its original location at Bankside, Southwark.

This inspired the founding of a number of Shakespeare's Globe Centres around the world, an activity in which Wanamaker also participated. Throughout the 1980s, American director Louis Fantasia taught workshops at the International Shakespeare's Globe Centre in collaboration with Wanamaker.Fantasia then later served as director of the Shakespeare's Globe's Teaching Shakespeare Through Performance Institute.

Many people maintained that a faithful Globe reconstruction was impossible to achieve due to the complications in the 16th-century design and modern fire safety requirements; however, Wanamaker and his associate Diana Devlin persevered in their vision for over 20 years to create the theatre. A new Globe theatre was eventually built according to a design based on the research of historical adviser John Orrell.

It was Wanamaker's wish that the new building recreate the Globe as it existed during most of Shakespeare's time there; that is, the 1599 building rather than its 1614 replacement. A study was made of what was known of the construction of The Theatre, the building from which the 1599 Globe obtained much of its timber, as a starting point for the modern building's design. To this were added: examinations of other surviving London buildings from the latter part of the 16th century; comparisons with other theatres of the period (particularly the Fortune Playhouse, for which the building contract survives); and contemporary drawings and descriptions of the first Globe. For practical reasons, some features of the 1614 rebuilding were incorporated into the modern design, such as the external staircases. The design team consisted of architect Theo Crosby of Pentagram, structural and services engineer Buro Happold, and quantity surveyors from Boyden & Co. The construction, building research and historic design details were undertaken by McCurdy & Co.

In 1994, the name "Globe Theatre" was used by one of the theatres in Shaftesbury Avenue; to make the name available and to avoid confusion, that year it was renamed as the Gielgud Theatre.

The theatre opened in 1997 under the name "Shakespeare's Globe Theatre". Recalling travel in the Elizabethan Era, Queen Elizabeth II arrived at the opening by boat on the River Thames, accompanied by the royal barge. The Globe stages plays every summer.

Indoor Panorama from the Shakespeare's Globe Theater in London

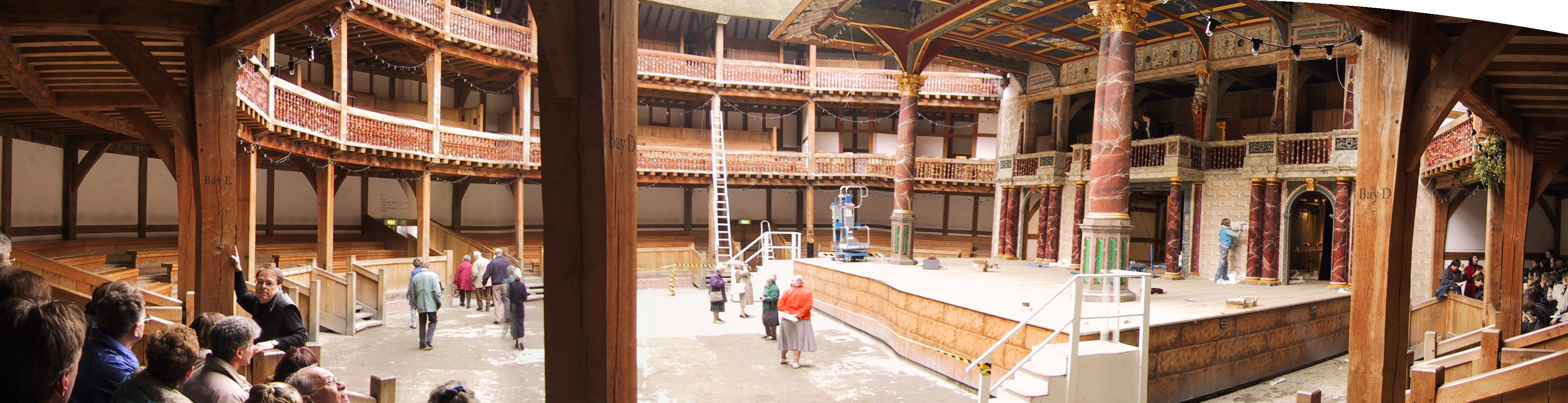

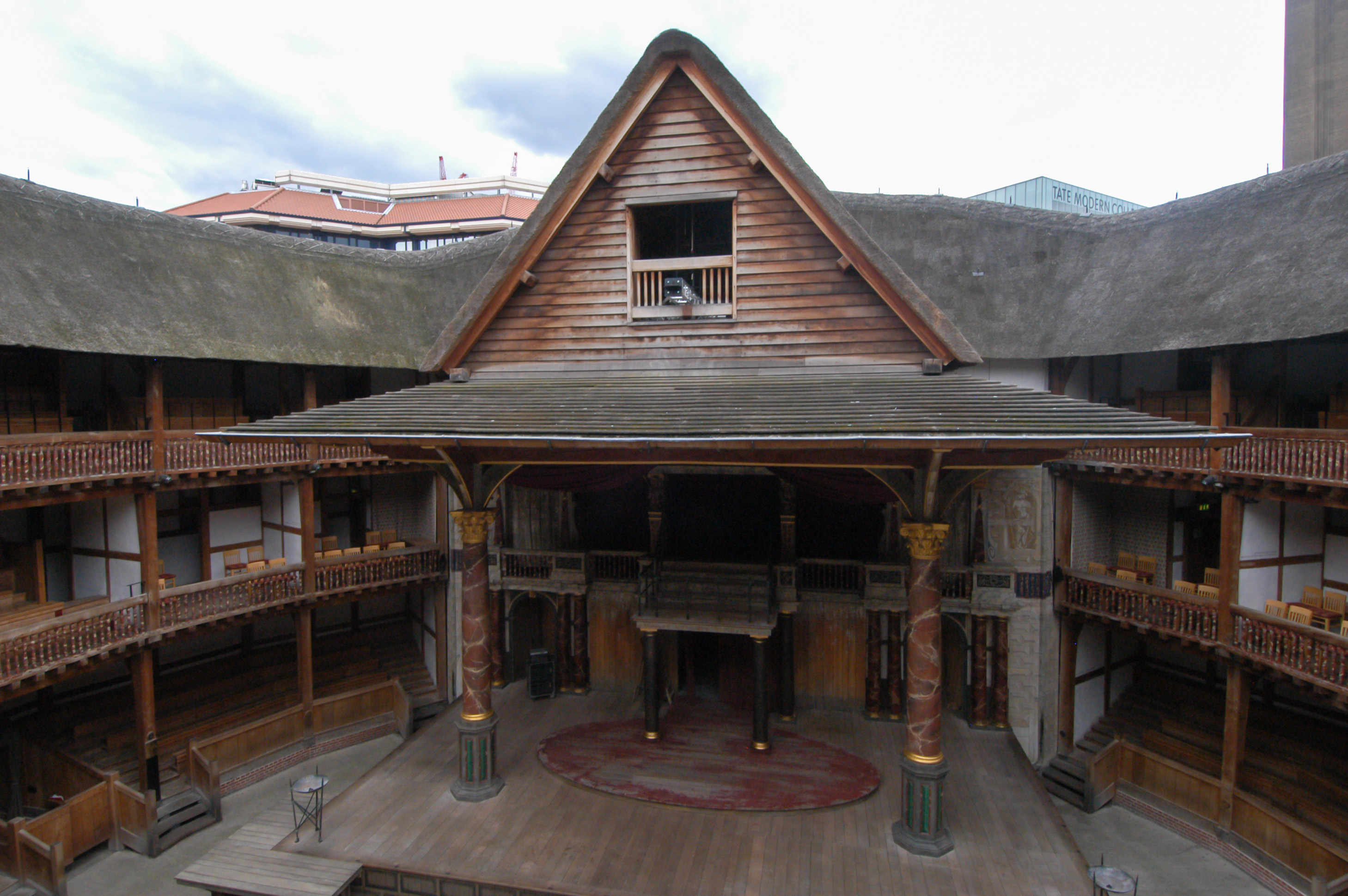

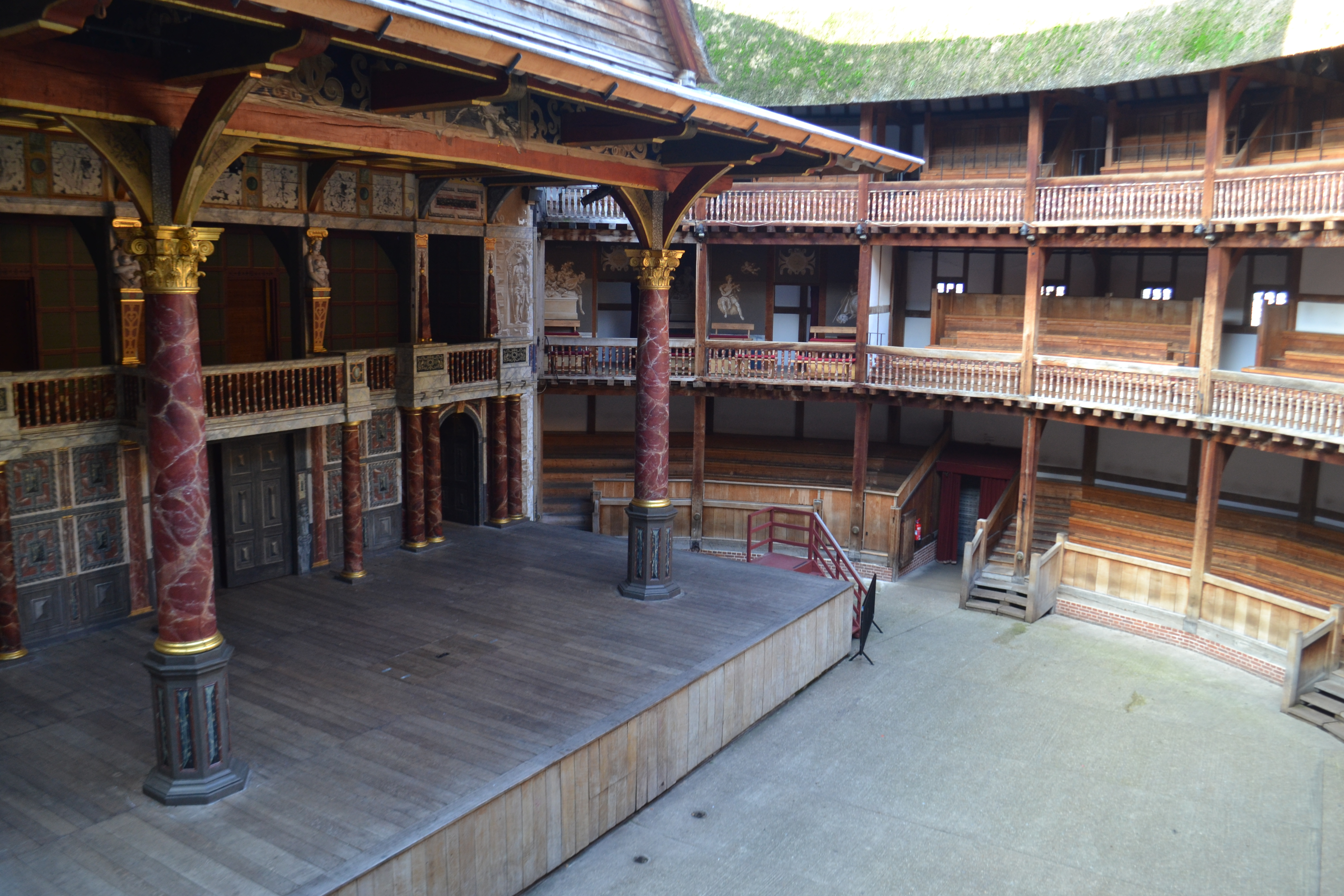

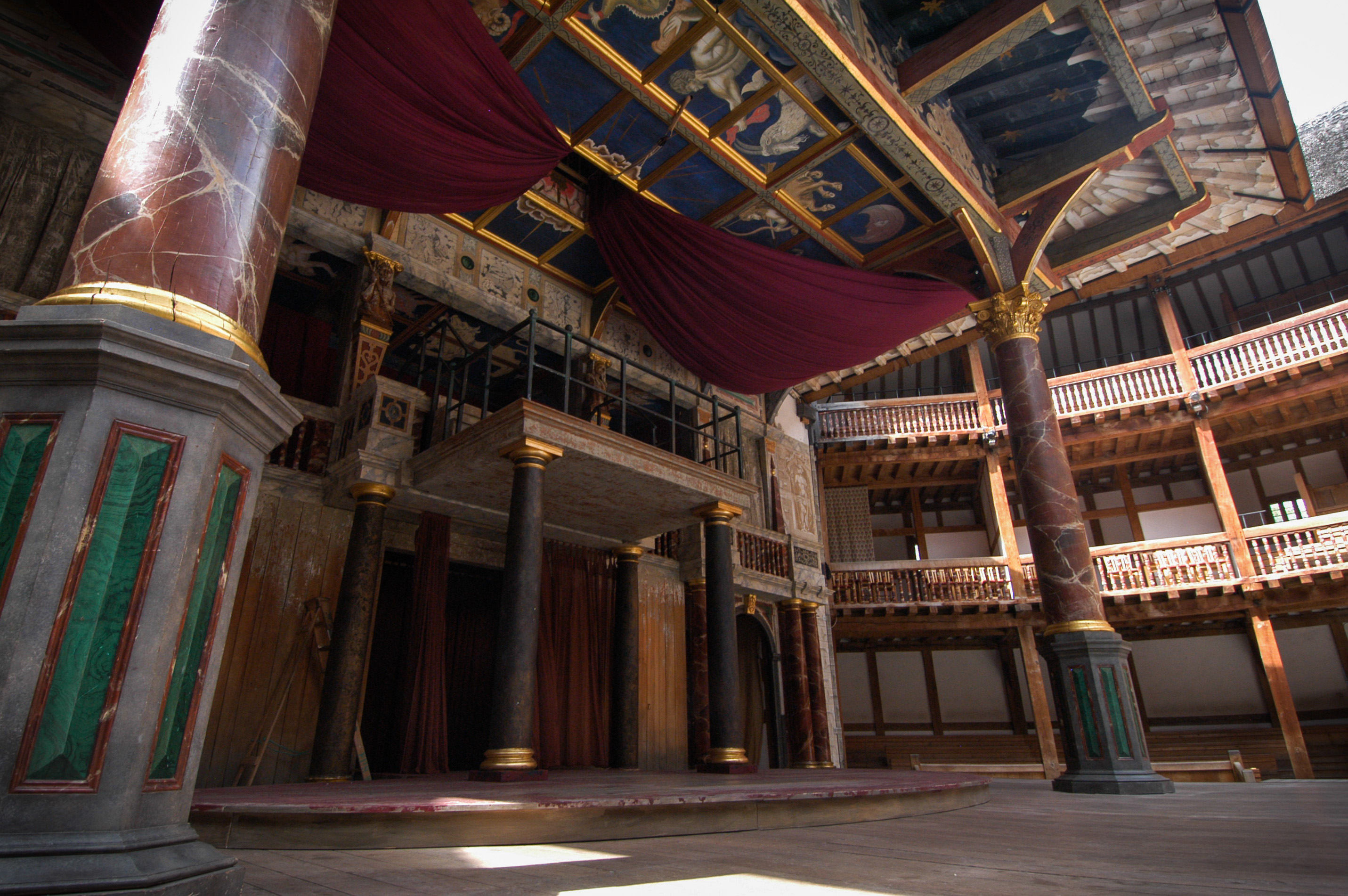

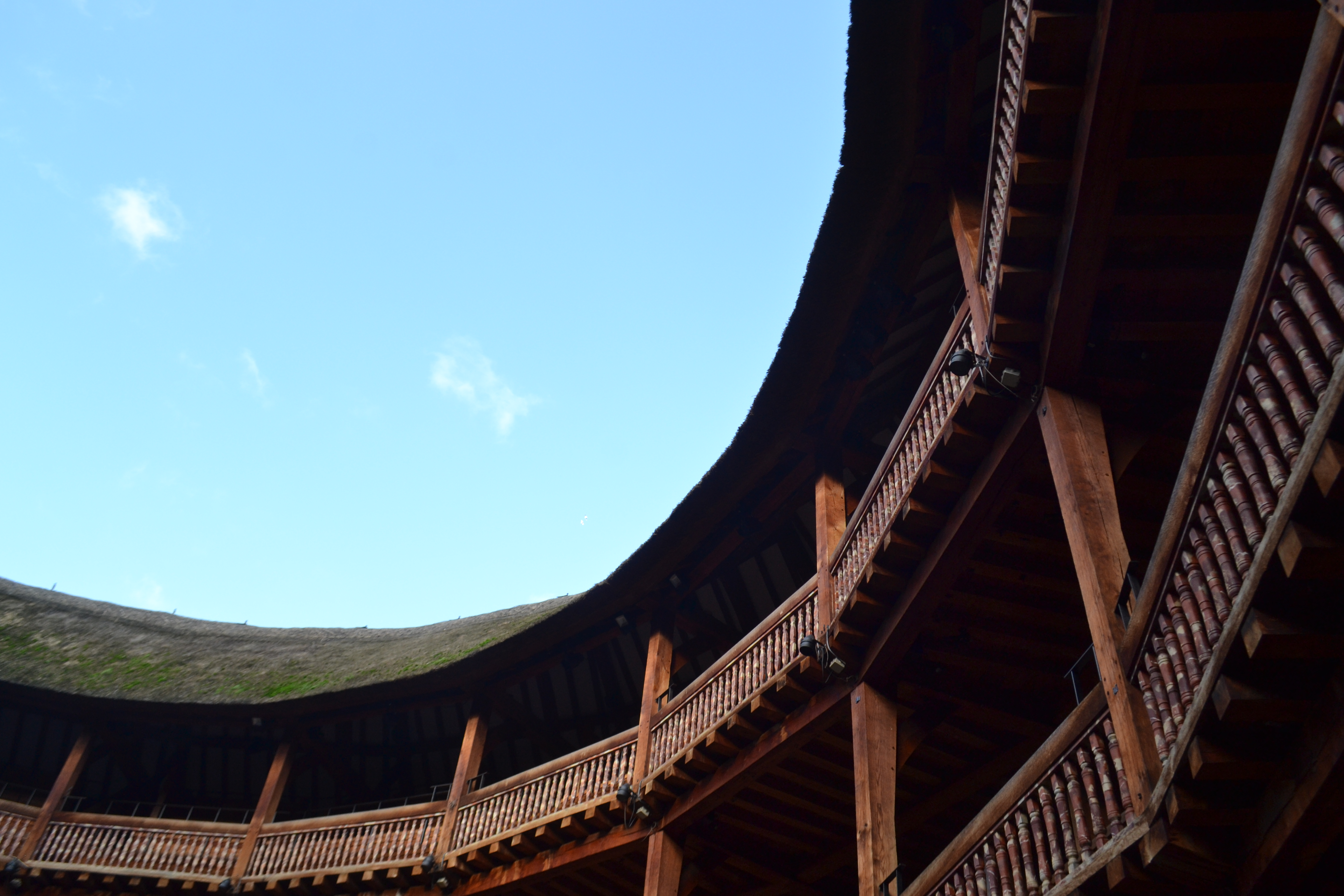

== Personnel ==
Mark Rylance became the first artistic director in 1995 and was succeeded by Dominic Dromgoole in 2006. In January 2016, Emma Rice began her term as the Globe's third artistic director, but in October 2016 announced her decision to resign from the position. On 24 July 2017 her successor was announced to be the actor and writer Michelle Terry. On 27 October 2026, Terry announced her intent to step down from the position at the end of 2027.

== Location and features ==
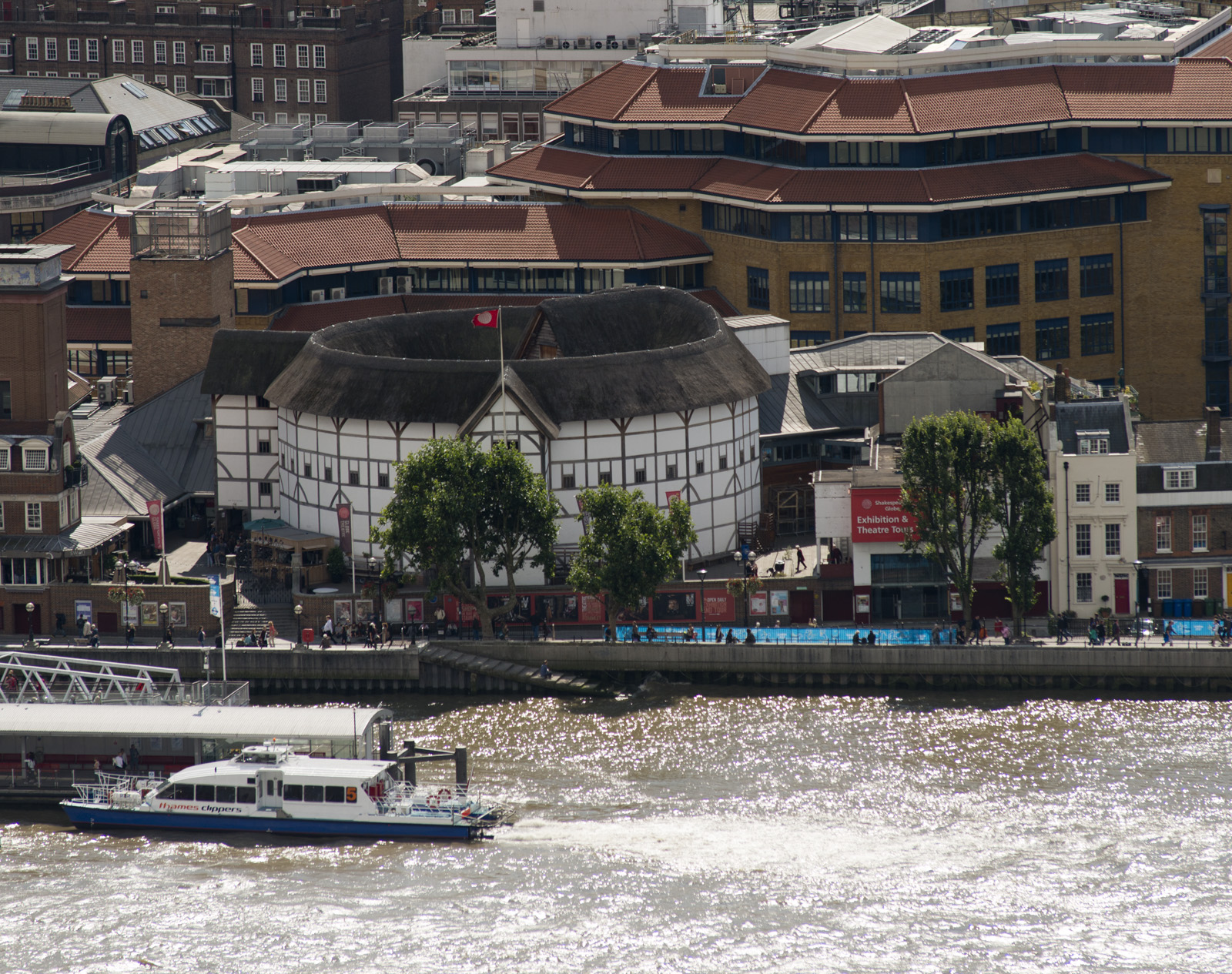
Elevated view of the Globe and River Thames

The theatre is located on Bankside, about 230 metres (750 ft) from the original site—measured from centre to centre. Listed Georgian townhouses now occupy part of the original site and cannot be considered for removal. Like the original Globe, the modern theatre has a thrust stage that projects into a large circular yard surrounded by three tiers of raked seating. The only covered parts of the amphitheatre are the stage and the seating areas.

The reconstruction was carefully researched so that the new building would be as faithful a replica of the original as possible. This was aided by the discovery of the remains of the original Rose Theatre, a nearby neighbour to the Globe, as final plans were being made for the site and structure.

The building itself is constructed entirely of English oak, with mortise and tenon joints and is, in this sense, an "authentic" 16th-century timber-framed building as no structural steel was used. The seats are simple benches (though cushions can be hired for performances) and the Globe has what has been claimed to be the first and only thatched roof permitted in London since the Great Fire of London in 1666. The modern thatch is well protected by fire retardants, and sprinklers on the roof ensure further protection against fire. The pit has a concrete surface, as opposed to earthen-ground covered with strewn rushes from the original theatre. The theatre has extensive backstage support areas for actors and musicians, and is attached to a modern lobby, restaurant, gift shop and visitor centre. Seating capacity is 873 with an additional 700 "Groundlings" standing in the yard, making up an audience about half the size of a typical audience in Shakespeare's time.

== Productions ==
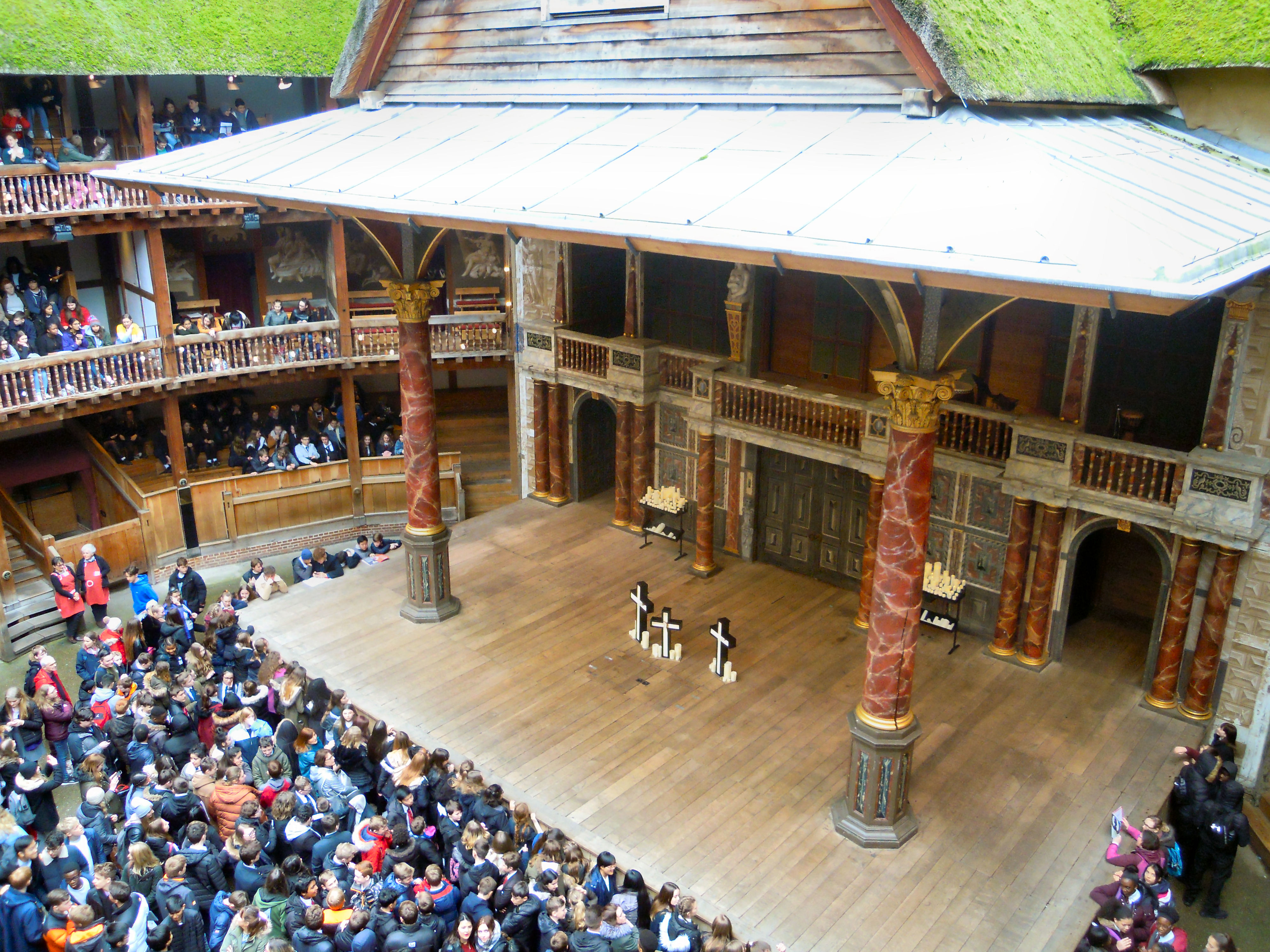
The Globe set up for a performance of Romeo and Juliet (2019)

Plays are staged during the summer, usually between May and the first week of October; in the winter, the theatre is used for educational purposes. Tours are available all year round. Some productions are filmed and released to cinemas as Globe on Screen productions (usually in the year following the live production), and on DVD and Blu-ray.

For its first 18 seasons, performances were engineered to duplicate the original environment of Shakespeare's Globe; there were no spotlights, and plays were staged during daylight hours and in the evenings (with the help of interior floodlights), there were no microphones, speakers or amplification. All music was performed live, most often on period instruments; and the actors and the audience could see and interact easily with each other, adding to the feeling of a shared experience and of a community event.

Typically, performances have been created in the spirit of experimentation to explore the original playing conditions of the 1599 Globe. Modern and conventional theatre technology such as spotlights and microphones were not used during this period. Beginning in the 2016 season, the new artistic director, Emma Rice, began experimenting with the theatre space by installing a temporary lighting and sound rig. The current artistic director, Michelle Terry, has brought back the original playing conditions.

The Globe operates without any public subsidy and generates £24 million in revenue per year.

Acting and design students from the Mason Gross School of the Arts at New Jersey's Rutgers University study abroad at the theater as part of the Rutgers Conservatory at Shakespeare's Globe, a longstanding partnership between the institutions.

== Sam Wanamaker Playhouse ==
Adjacent to the Globe is the Sam Wanamaker Playhouse, an indoor theatre modelled after a Jacobean-era theatre and used for performances during the winter months when the main theatre cannot be used.

== Read Not Dead ==
Read Not Dead is a series of play readings, or staged "performances with scripts" that have been presented as part of the educational programme of Shakespeare's Globe since 1995. The plays selected are those that were written between 1576 and 1642 by Shakespeare's contemporaries or near contemporaries. These readings are performed at Shakespeare's Globe Studios as well as other theatres, halls, festivals and fields nationwide.

In 2013, there were Read Not Dead performances at the Wilderness Festival and at the Glastonbury Festival. In 2014, the final production of Read Not Dead's first season was performed at the Sam Wanamaker Playhouse, which is the indoor Jacobean-style theatre. The play selected for that occasion was Robert Daborne's A Christian Turn'd Turk.

== Globe on Screen ==
The Globe's productions are often screened in cinemas and released on DVD and Blu-ray. In 2015, the venue launched Globe Player, a video-on-demand service enabling viewers to watch the plays on laptops and mobile devices. The theatre was the first in the world to make its plays available as video-on-demand.

== Other replicas ==
Replicas and free interpretations of the Globe have been built around the world:

Argentina

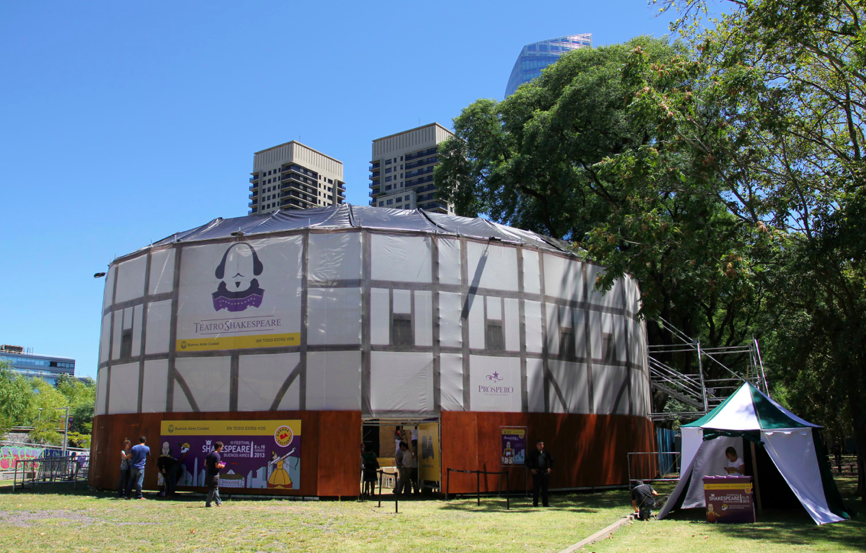
Teatro Shakespeare (Buenos Aires, Argentina)

- Argentina: Teatro Shakespeare

Germany

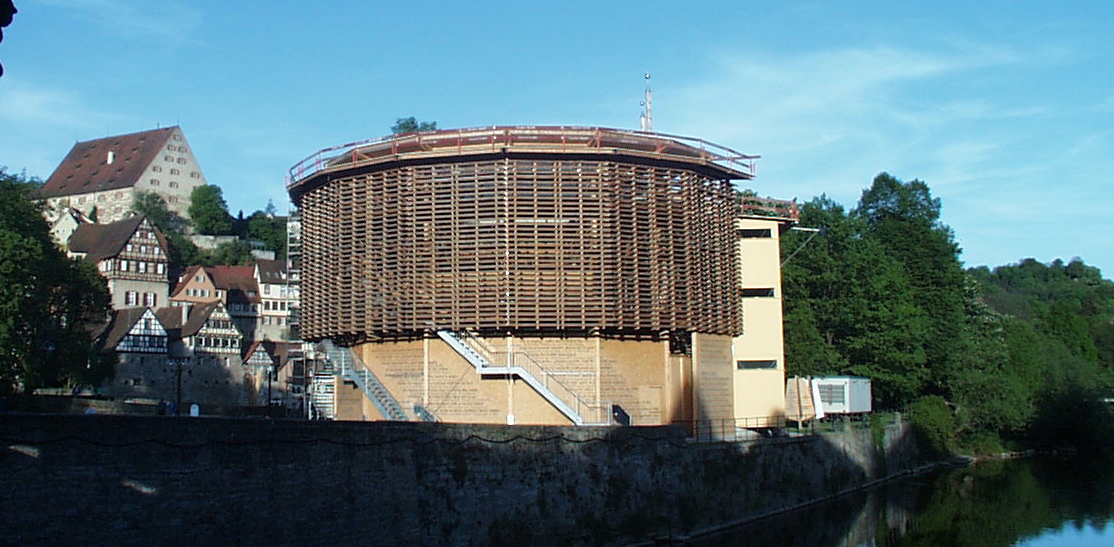
Globe-Theater, Schwäbisch Hall, Baden-Württemberg, Germany

- Neuss am Rhein: Globe Neuss
- Rust, Baden, Germany: in the Europa-Park
- Schwäbisch Hall, Baden-Württemberg: used to house a replica of the interior of the Globe Theatre, now to be rebuilt in Berlin

Italy

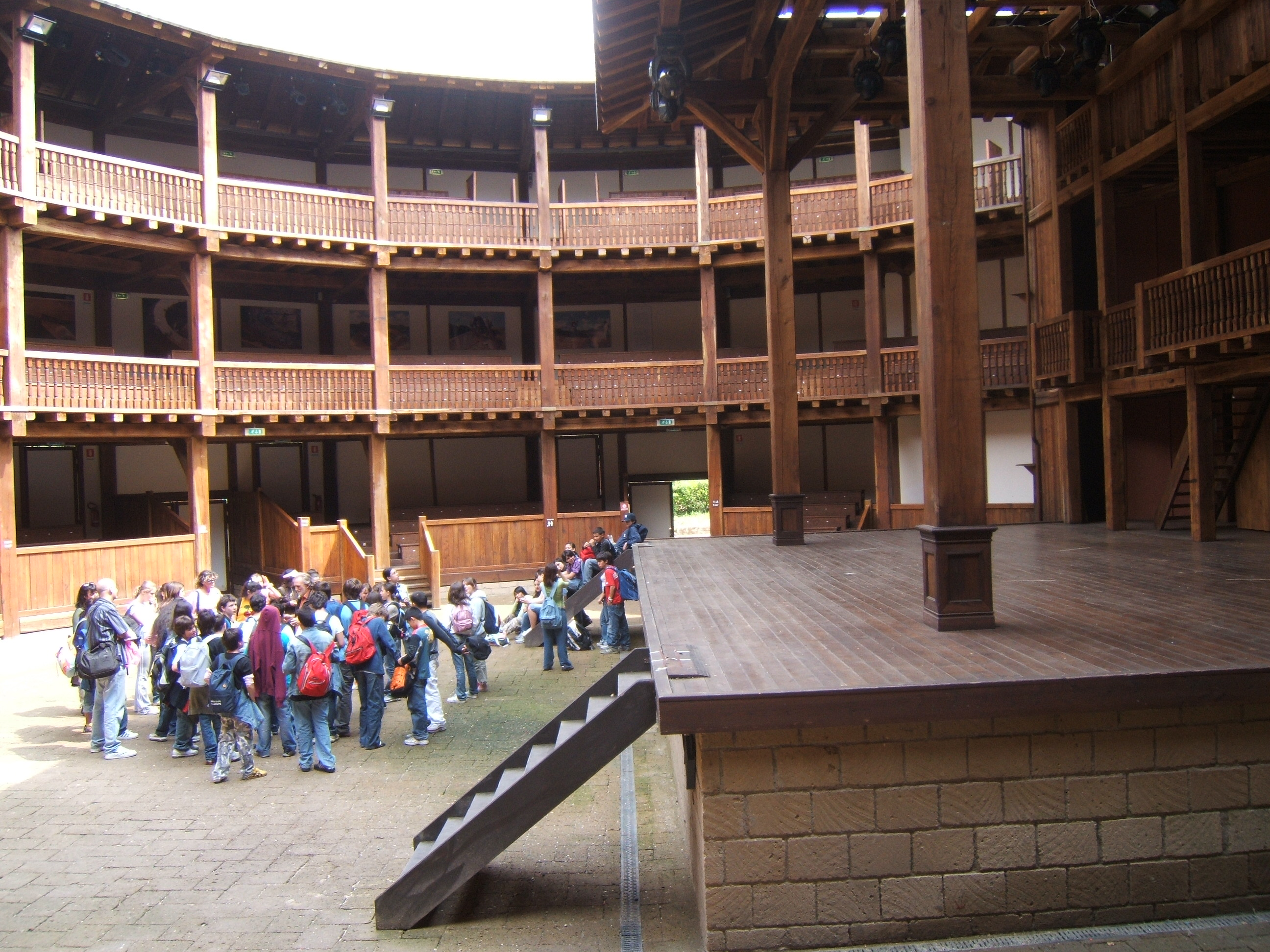
The interior of "Silvano Toti Globe Theatre", Rome

- Rome: Globe Theatre

Japan

- Tokyo: Panasonic Globe Theatre
- Tokyo: Meisei University's Shakespeare Hall, at its Hino campus

New Zealand

- Auckland: Pop-up Globe

The Netherlands

- Diever: Shakespearetheater Diever

United States

- Ashland, Oregon: Allen Elizabethan Theatre
- Austin, Texas: Curtain Theatre
- Cedar City, Utah: Adams Shakespearean Theatre
- Dallas, Texas: Old Globe Theatre
- Odessa, Texas: Globe of the Great Southwest
- San Diego, California: Old Globe Theatre
- Williamsburg, Virginia: Globe Theatre, in Busch Gardens Williamsburg
- Twin Lake, Michigan: Blue Lake Fine Arts Camp, The Rose Playhouse
- Hempstead, New York: Hofstra University, Pop-up Globe

== See also (period theatres) ==
- Curtain Theatre
- The Rose
