= Old Synagogue (Neuss) =

Synagogue in Neuss (1867–1938)

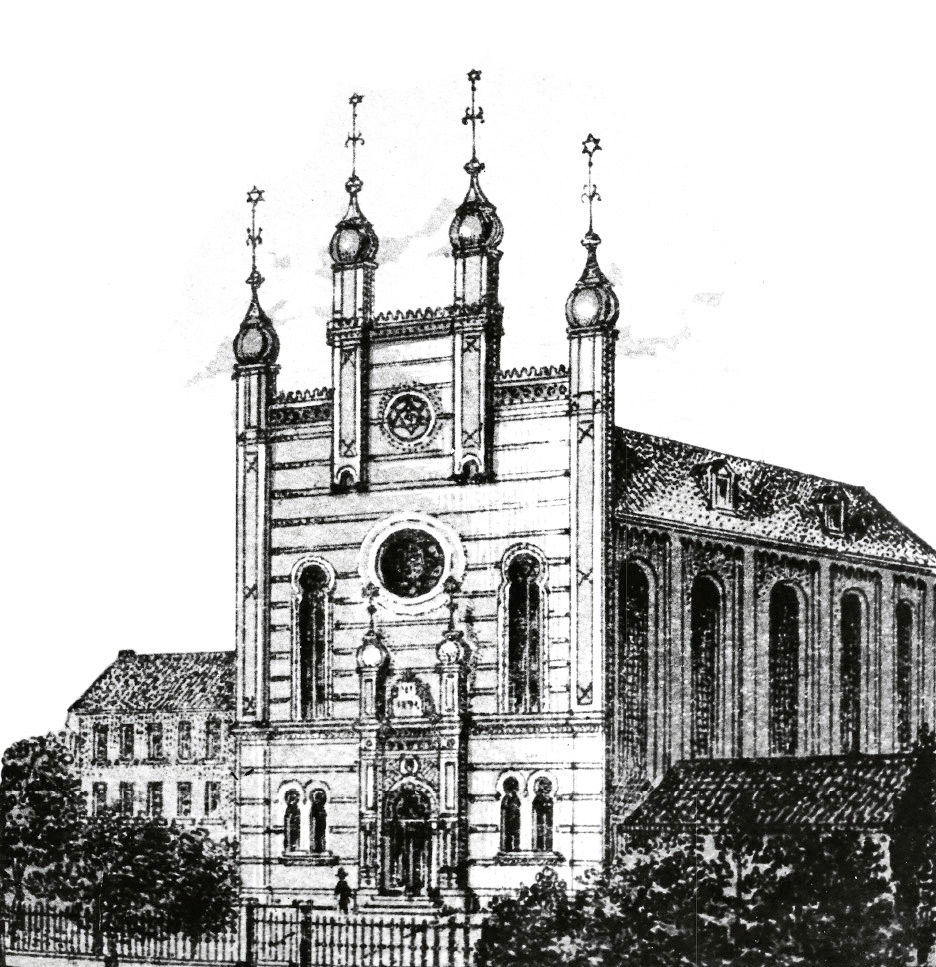
Old Synagogue around 1870

The old synagogue of Neuss was located in Neuss by the Sparkasse Neuss on the other side of Promenadenstraße.

== History ==
Already in the 12th century there was a small Jewish community and a synagogue in Neuss. The Jews lived on the “Judensteg” near the later Hessentor and later in the “Glockhammer”; the synagogue was also located there. The Jews were expelled from the city in the year 1463. During the French period and the religious freedom that came with it, a Jewish community formed again, which initially set up its prayer room in a private house on Neustraße.

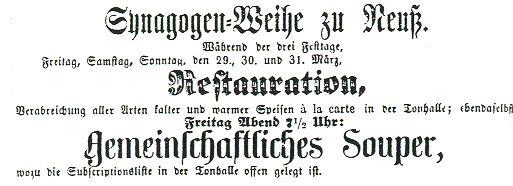
Invitation to the inauguration of the Old Synagogue, 1867

The new synagogue building designed by building councillor Friedrich Weise (1801–1874) was ceremonially inaugurated on 29 March 1867. Architecturally, the building was oriented toward an Oriental style with a light reddish stone façade, four onion towers, and a golden Star of David. Inside, there was no matroneum; in the seating arrangement, men and women were separated by the central aisle. In 1890 the Jewish community of Neuss reached its highest number of 300 members.

The synagogue was burned down during Kristallnacht on the night of 9 to 10 November 1938 and was then completely destroyed in 1941. Many of the Jews of Neuss at that time came from Hülchrath; they had believed they would be safer in Neuss. In August 1942, according to official statistics, Neuss was “judenfrei.” A memorial in the form of a 30-ton stone, worked by the sculptor Ulrich Rückriem, has commemorated the building since 1995.

On 19 September 2021, a New Synagogue for about 600 people of Jewish faith from the region was opened and inaugurated in Neuss.

== Literature ==
- Stefan Rohrbacher: Juden in Neuss. Neuss 1986, ISBN 978-3-9801294-0-4.
- Elfi Pracht-Jörns: Jüdisches Kulturerbe in Nordrhein-Westfalen. Teil II: Regierungsbezirk Düsseldorf. ISBN 978-3-7616-1444-0, S. 485–488.

51°11′48.4″N 6°41′28.7″E
