= Peter Thyraeus =

German Jesuit theologian

Peter (or Petrus) Thyraeus (1546 – December 3, 1601) was a German Jesuit theologian.

Thyraeus was born in Neuss, the brother of Herman Thyraeus, also a Jesuit theologian. He joined the Jesuits in 1561, and taught at Jesuit colleges in Trier and Mainz from 1574.

In 1590, he was appointed professor of theology at the University of Würzburg, where he was well regarded by Prince-Bishop Julius Echter von Mespelbrunn. He died at Würzburg in 1601.

He published a number of works on theology, which the Allgemeine Deutsche Biographie grouped into three classes: writings on visions and apparitions, writings on possession and exorcism, and writings on traditional theological subjects such as the Eucharist and the role of the Catholic Church. His writing on exorcism "has been called the first 'scientific' (i.e. systematic) research on modern exorcism, based in part on the experiences of Peter Canisius".
