= Neuss =

City in North Rhine-Westphalia, Germany

- City
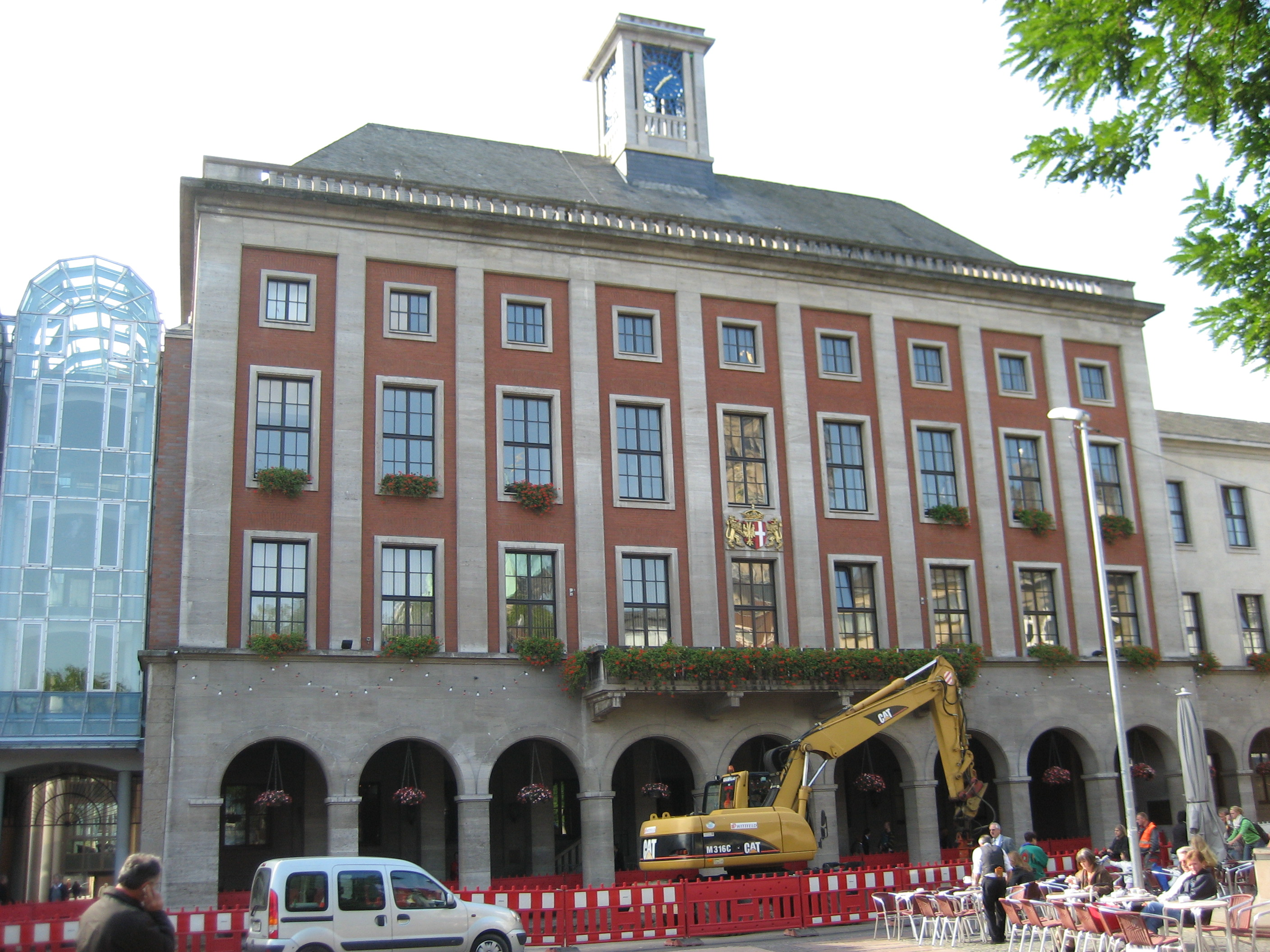
- Town hall

- Flag Coat of arms

- Location of Neuss within Rhein-Kreis Neuss district
- Interactive map of Neuss
- Location within Germany Location within North Rhine-Westphalia
- Coordinates: 51°12′N 6°42′E
- Country: Germany
- State: North Rhine-Westphalia
- Admin. region: Düsseldorf
- District: Rhein-Kreis Neuss

Government
  - Mayor (2020–25): Reiner Breuer (SPD)

Area
  - Total: 99.52 km^{2} (38.42 sq mi)
- Elevation: 40 m (130 ft)

Population (2025-12-31)
  - Total: 153,767
  - Density: 1,545/km^{2} (4,002/sq mi)
- Time zone: UTC+01:00 (CET)
  - Summer (DST): UTC+02:00 (CEST)
- Postal codes: 41460-41472
- Dialling codes: 02131, 02137 (Norf), 02182
- Vehicle registration: NE
- Website: www.neuss.de

Neuss (German: [nɔʏs]; written Neuß until 1968; Limburgish: Nüss [ˈnʏs]) is a city in North Rhine-Westphalia, Germany. It is on the west bank of the Rhine opposite Düsseldorf. Neuss is the largest city within the Rhein-Kreis Neuss district. It is primarily known for its historic Roman sites, as well as the annual Neusser Bürger-Schützenfest. Neuss and Trier share the title of "Germany's oldest city", and in 1984 Neuss celebrated the 2000th anniversary of its founding in 16 BCE.

== History ==
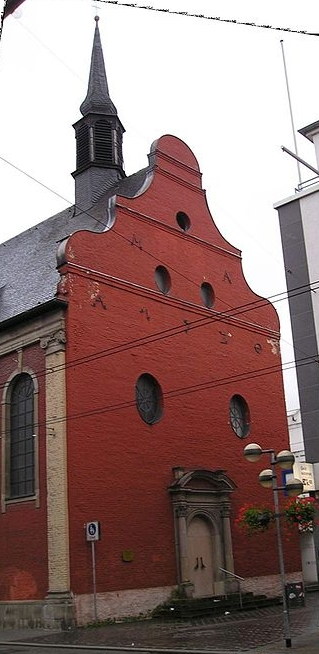
Saint Sebastian church in the city of Neuss

=== Roman period ===
Neuss was founded by the Romans in 16 BC as a military fortification (castrum) with the current city to the north of the castrum, at the confluence of the rivers Rhine and Erft, with the name of Novaesium. Legio XVI Gallica ("Gallic 16th Legion") of the Roman army was stationed here in 43–70 AD. It was disbanded after surrendering during the Batavian rebellion (AD 70).

Later a civil settlement was founded in the area of today's centre of the town during the 1st century AD. Novaesium, together with Trier (Augusta Treverorum), is one of the three oldest Roman settlements in Germany.

=== Middle Ages ===
Neuss grew during the Middle Ages because of its prime location on several routes, by the crossing of the great Rhine valley, and with its harbour and ferry. During the 10th century, the remains of the martyr and tribune Saint Quirinus, not to be confused with the Roman god Quirinus, had been relocated to Neuss. This resulted in pilgrimage to the shrine of St. Quirinus even from countries beyond the borders of the Holy Roman Empire. Neuss was first documented as a town in 1138.

One of the main events in the town's history is the siege of the town in 1474–75 by Charles the Bold, Duke of Burgundy, that lasted for nearly a year. The citizens of Neuss withstood the siege and were therefore rewarded by the Holy Roman Emperor Frederick III. The town was granted the right to mint its own coins and to carry the imperial coat of arms, the imperial eagle and the crown, in the town's own coat of arms. Neuss became a member of the Hanseatic League, although it was never accepted by the other members of the League.

=== Early modernity ===
In 1586, more than two-thirds of the city was destroyed by fire, and several wars during the reign of King Louis XIV of France resulted in worsening finances for Neuss. Its importance as a place for trading declined rapidly, and from the mid-17th century onwards, Neuss became a place only important for its agriculture.

Until the late 18th century, Neuss belonged to the Electorate of Cologne. From 1794 to 1814, Neuss was part of France during the reign of Napoleon. In 1815 after the Napoleonic Wars, Neuss became part of the Kingdom of Prussia, and was reorganized as a district with the municipalities of Neuss, Dormagen, Nettesheim, Nievenheim, Rommerskirchen and Zons. The town had a population of 6,333 at that time. It was part of the Prussian Province of Jülich-Cleves-Berg (1815–22) and its successor, the Rhine Province (1822–1946).

=== 19th century – present ===
Neuss regained its economic power in the 19th century, with expansion of the harbour in 1835, and increasing industrial activity. The city's boundaries were expanded in 1881. Neuss became part of the new state of North Rhine-Westphalia in 1946.

In 1968 the spelling of the name was changed from Neuß to Neuss. In 1975 the town of Neuss and the district of Grevenbroich were joined to form the district of Rhein-Kreis Neuss with a population of 440,000 and its seat of government in Neuss. Neuss is also home to Toshiba's European headquarters, 3M, Norsk Hydro ASA and UPS.

== Population ==
Historical population

Year	Pop.	±% p.a.
1965	128,289	—
1970	137,869	+1.45%
1975	148,202	+1.46%
1980	149,338	+0.15%
1985	143,517	−0.79%
1990	147,019	+0.48%
1995	148,796	+0.24%

Year	Pop.	±% p.a.
2000	150,013	+0.16%
2005	151,610	+0.21%
2010	151,388	−0.03%
2015	155,414	+0.53%
2020	153,109	−0.30%
2025	153,767	+0.09%

Source: Landesdatabank Nordrhein-Westfalen

Largest groups of foreign residents
Nationality	Population (2018)
Turkey	5,440
Poland	1,775
Greece	1,627
Portugal	1,132
Italy	1,088
Serbia	1,072
Syria	982
Croatia	829

=== Jewish history ===
A Jewish community has been documented in the city since the High Middle Ages. The earliest documentation of Jews in the city is from 1096, when Jews from Cologne fleeing from Crusaders were sheltered in the city by the Archbishop of Cologne Hermann III. Nevertheless, about 200 of them (men, women, and children) were slaughtered by Crusaders. This all was in the context of what is known as the Rhineland massacres.

There is however no indication that Neuss already had an organized Jewish community in 1096; It is however certain that there was one in the Staufer period from the late 12th century onwards, in the context of a general influx of merchants into the city at the time.

According to Ephraim of Bonn, on 11 January 1197, multiple members of the Jewish community were put to death as revenge for the killing of a Christian girl by a mentally ill Jew. The killer and several of his close relatives were gruesomely executed. They seem to have been allowed a Jewish funeral: their bodies were brought – presumably by boat – to Xanten, where they were buried alongside victims of the Rhineland massacres of 1096.

The community in the High Middle Ages at first resided in the area where merchants lived, between the haven and the market. The passage to the haven's loading place was known as the Judensteg. By the year 1300 however the Judensteg was now inhabited by Christians, the Jews having moved to the area around the Glockhammer, where their synagogue and school were also located. The area was not exactly a ghetto, as it was not sealed, and Christians also lived there.

From the 14th century onwards the Jews faced increasing economic competition, firstly due the loss of their advantageous former location near the docks, and later because of the loss of their monopoly in money lending, with the arrival of bankers from Lombardy and Cahors.

The city was hit by the Black Death in 1348–49, and the community suffered from gruesome persecutions during that time, as was the case elsewhere in Europe. In the wake of the plague, the community was numerically decimated and economically weakened. A wave of religious extremism and intolerance swept the area at the time, and the Jews were increasingly pressured and became objects of political infighting: In the year 1424, Jews were for a time expelled from the city; this was meant as a middle finger to the Landesherr, who had placed the Jews under his protection.

The Jews later came back, but were ultimately expelled again in 1464. The Archbishop of Cologne Ruprecht von der Pfalz visited the city on 5 May and met with mayors, aldermen, and the council in an attempt to halt the expulsion, but to no avail. Jews were from now on banned from residing in the city, and from staying overnight within city walls. In 1694, Jews were given permission to hold a cattle market in front of the Obertor. Facing overdue lump sum payments, in 1704 the city instored a special tax on Jews entering the city known as the Judenleibzoll.

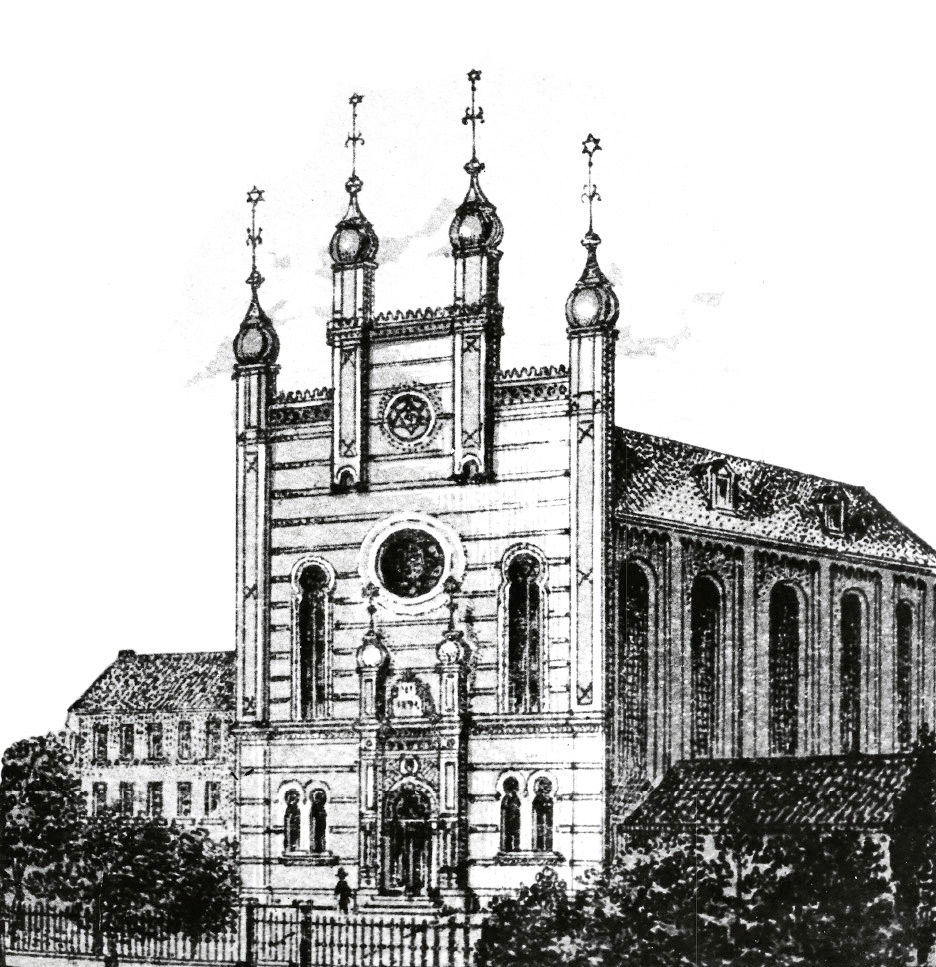
The former Synagogue of Neuss, torched down during the Kristallnacht on 10 November 1938

In 1794 during the War of the First Coalition, Neuss fell under French control, and all discriminatory anti-Jewish laws were subsequently abrogated. It was only in 1808 however, in a context of nascent industrialization and population growth, that for the first time in centuries a Jewish family moved to the city: That of the butcher Josef Großmann, who had come from Hülchrath. The community slowly rose in number: in 1830, there were around 100 Jews out of a population of approximately 8000. The community kept on growing in size throughout the century.

Jews who moved to Neuss came from surrounding rural areas in the Rhineland, and as a result were more conservative and shaped by rural life than their counterparts in other German cities. Popular innovations in the time of the Haskalah such as religious services in German did not take root here: they continued in Hebrew. As a general rule of thumb, Neuss Jews were more religious than in other German cities.

Relations between Jews and Christians were generally good at the time: they lived one next to another, and one could find Christians performing forbidden tasks such as lighting/extinguishing fires in Jewish homes on Shabbat.

A fracture in this peace took place in 1834 however: In the Niederrhein area blood libel rumors spread around, leading to a wave of anti-Jewish violence: Synagogues were set on fire in Gindorf and Bedburdyck; in Hemmerden, Wevelinghoven and elsewhere fierce fighting took place between vigilantes and hussars. Neuss was not left unaffected either, with crowds strolling down the streets chanting anti-Jewish songs, with the epicenter being the poor areas of Neuss around the Viehmarkt. This situation lasted for days, until a contingent of soldiers was moved into the city to quell the unrest.

On 29 March 1867, the synagogue was unveiled, designed by the Prussian architect Friedrich Weise and built in the popular Orientalist style. The city held celebrations for 3 days upon its inauguration. Despite serving only about 1% of the population, the Synagogue was a proud hallmark of the Neuss skyline. The synagogue community's size peaked at 316 members in 1890.

After the acquittal of the Jewish butcher Adolf Buschoff in the 1892 Xanten blood libel case, antisemitic violence took place in nearby Neuss: Jewish-owned property was set on fire, and Jewish families were sent threatening messages. About a quarter of the community left the city.

In 1933, there were no more than 227 citizens of Jewish faith in Neuss. From that year onwards they suffered increasing persecution by the Nazis. Few went into exile on time. Then began the so-called "Final Solution to the Jewish Question" and the deportations. On 22 July 1942, the last inhabitant of the Judenhaus at Küpperstaße 2 was put on a train from Aachen to Theresienstadt. On 23 November 1942, Neuss was cynically declared Judenrein. (= clean of Jews)

However, there was still a handful of Jews who survived through hiding, or who were not targeted due to being married to "Aryans".

The exact number of Jewish victims of the Nazi regime is not known with certainty. However, one can find the names of 204 murdered Jews who had some sort of link to Neuss on a monument by Ulrich Rückriem. A significant amount of Stolpersteine can be found around the city.

Since the 1990s the community has enjoyed a revival thanks to an influx of Jews from the ex-USSR. In 2021, it was estimated that around 550 Jews lived in Neuss.

== Politics ==
=== Mayor ===
The current mayor of Neuss is Reiner Breuer of the Social Democratic Party (SPD). The most recent mayoral election was held on 13 September 2020, and the results were as follows:

Candidate	Party	Votes	%
Reiner Breuer	Social Democratic Party	30,337	52.9
Jan-Philipp Büchler	Christian Democratic Union	18,800	32.8
Michael Klinkicht	Alliance 90/The Greens	4,049	7.1
Roland Sperling	Die Linke	1,346	2.4
Michael Fielenbach	Free Democratic Party	1,181	2.1
Thomas Lang	UWG/Free Voters Neuss	1,158	2.0
Hans Dietz	Centre Party	463	0.8
Valid votes		57,334	98.9
Invalid votes		617	1.1
Total		57,951	100.0
Electorate/voter turnout		120,328	48.2
Source: City of Neuss Archived 6 April 2022 at the Wayback Machine

==== Mayors and Lord Mayors since 1849 ====
- 1849–1851: Heinrich Thywissen, Mayor (Bürgermeister)
- 1851–1858: Michael Frings, mayor
- 1858–1882: Johann Joseph Ridder, mayor
- 1882–1889: Carl Wenders, mayor
- 1890–1902: Engelbert Tilmann, mayor
- 1902–1921: Franz Gielen, Lord Mayor
- 1921–1930: Heinrich Hüpper, Lord Mayor
- 1930–1934: Wilhelm Henrichs, Centre Party, Lord Mayor (Oberbürgermeister)
- 1934–1938: Wilhelm Eberhard Gelberg, NSDAP, Lord Mayor
- 1938–1945: Wilhelm Tödtmann, NSDAP, Lord Mayor
- 1945–1946: Josef Nagel, Lord Mayor
- 1946: Josef Schmitz, Lord Mayor
- 1946–1961: Alfons Frings, CDU, Lord Mayor
- 1961–1967: Peter Wilhelm Kallen, Lord Mayor
- 1967–1982: Herbert Karrenberg, CDU, Lord Mayor
- 1982–1987: Hermann Wilhelm Thywissen, CDU, Lord Mayor
- 1987–1998: Bertold Mathias Reinartz, CDU, mayor
- 1998–2015: Herbert Napp, CDU, mayor
- 2015–present: Reiner Breuer, SPD, mayor

=== City council ===
Results of the 2020 city council election

The Neuss city council governs the city alongside the Mayor. The most recent city council election was held on 13 September 2020, and the results were as follows:

Party	Votes	%	+/-	Seats	+/-
Christian Democratic Union (CDU)	20,810	36.4	▼3.4	21	▼6
Social Democratic Party (SPD)	18,517	32.4	▲5.1	19	±0
Alliance 90/The Greens (Grüne)	7,996	14.0	▲3.2	8	▲1
Alternative for Germany (AfD)	2,420	4.2	▼0.0	2	▼1
Free Democratic Party (FDP)	1,882	3.3	▼4.9	2	▼4
The Left (Die Linke)	1,601	2.8	▼1.2	2	▼1
UWG/Free Voters Neuss (UWG/FW)	1,106	1.9	0.0	1	±0
Action Party for Animal Protection (hier!)	929	1.6	New	1	New
Active for Neuss (Aktiv)	863	1.5	New	1	New
Die PARTEI	823	1.4	New	1	New
Centre Party (Zentrum)	223	0.4	▼0.2	0	±0
Independent Volkmar Wolfram Ortlepp	18	0.0	New	0	New
Valid votes	57,188	98.8			
Invalid votes	672	1.2			
Total	57,860	100.0		58	▼10
Electorate/voter turnout	120,328	48.1	▲2.6		
Source: City of Neuss Archived 25 June 2021 at the Wayback Machine

== Number of inhabitants ==
- 1798: 4,423
- 1831: 7,888
- 1861: 10,300
- 1885: 20,074
- 1900: 28,472
- 1925: 44,958
- 1945: 51,624
- 1965: 111,104
- 1987: 142,178
- 2015: 159,672

== Sports ==
One sports club is Neusser Schlittschuh-Klub. Their sections are figure skating, ice stock sport and, as the only club in Germany, bandy. With the lack of a large ice surface, the variety rink bandy is practiced. There are also two football clubs in the city of Neuss: VfR Neuss Football Club and DJK Novesia Neuss and an American Football Team: Neuss Legions American Football.

== Transport ==
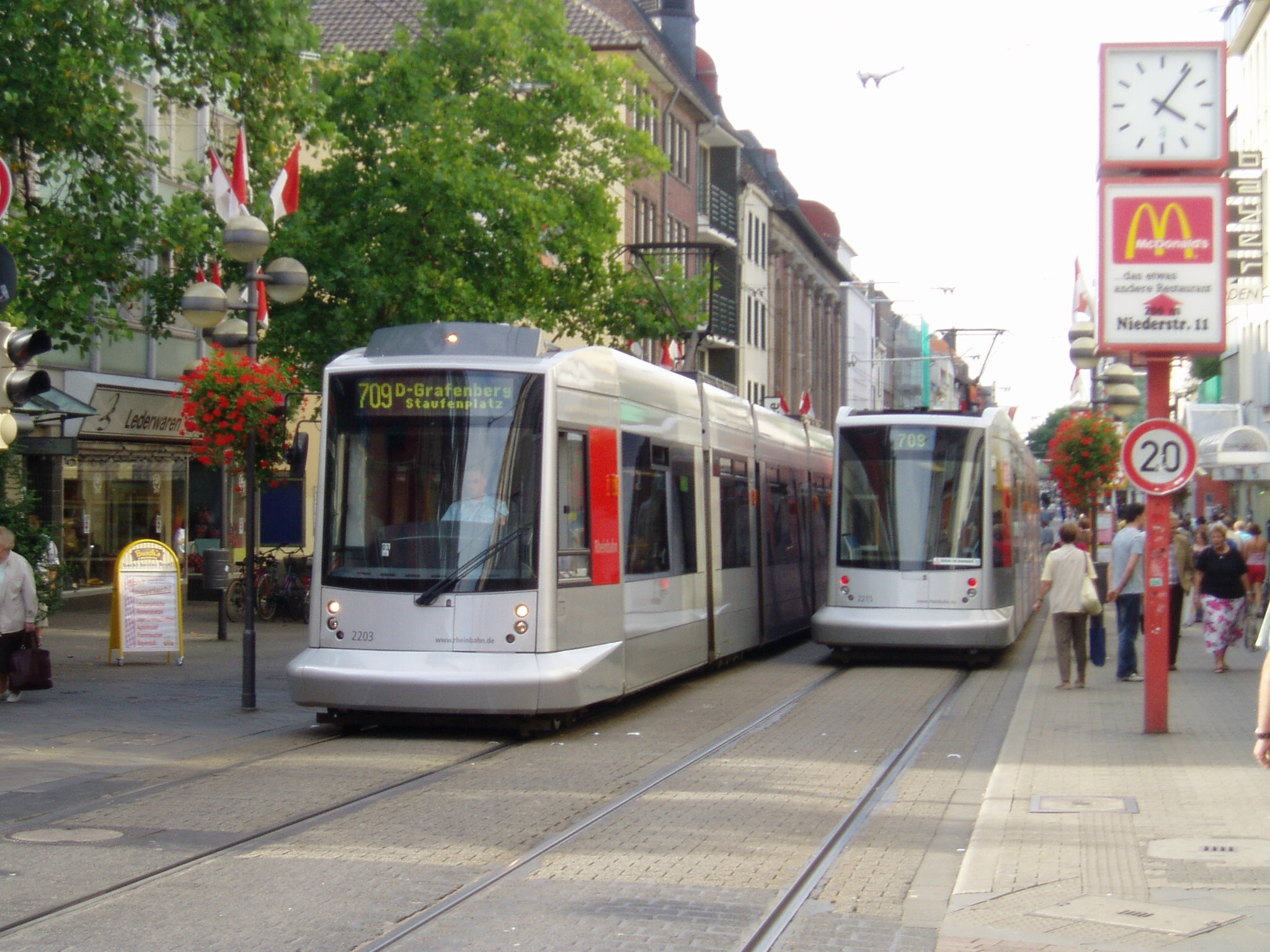
Rheinbahn tram in downtown Neuss

The city is served by Düsseldorf Airport, located 15 km (9 mi) north east of Neuss (17 minutes drive).

== Points of interest ==
- Botanischer Garten der Stadt Neuss, the city's botanical garden
- Basilica of St. Quirinus: a 13th-century late romanesque church, dedicated to the city's patron saint and housing a shrine with his relics. Its dome-shaped eastern tower is one of the city's landmarks. In 2009 it was granted the title of minor basilica.
- Obertor (Upper Gate): southern city gate, built circa 1200; today part of the Clemens Sels Museum Neuss. It is the only remaining of originally six gates that were part of the medieval town fortification.
- Blutturm (Bloody Tower): built in the 13th century, the only remaining round tower of the historic town fortification.
- Zum "Schwatte Päd" (The Black Horse): the oldest public house in the Lower Rhine region, established 1604
- Saint Sebastianus Church
- Saint Maria Church:
- Christuskirche (Christ church): historicistic church, the city's oldest Protestant church
- Globe Theater, a replica of the London Globe Theatre, with an annual Shakespeare festival
- Hamtor/the Hamgate
- Neusser Bürger-Schützenfest: one of Germany's largest marksmen's festivals, taking place annually on the last weekend in August; roundabout 7000 marksmen take part in the traditional parades.

== Notable people ==
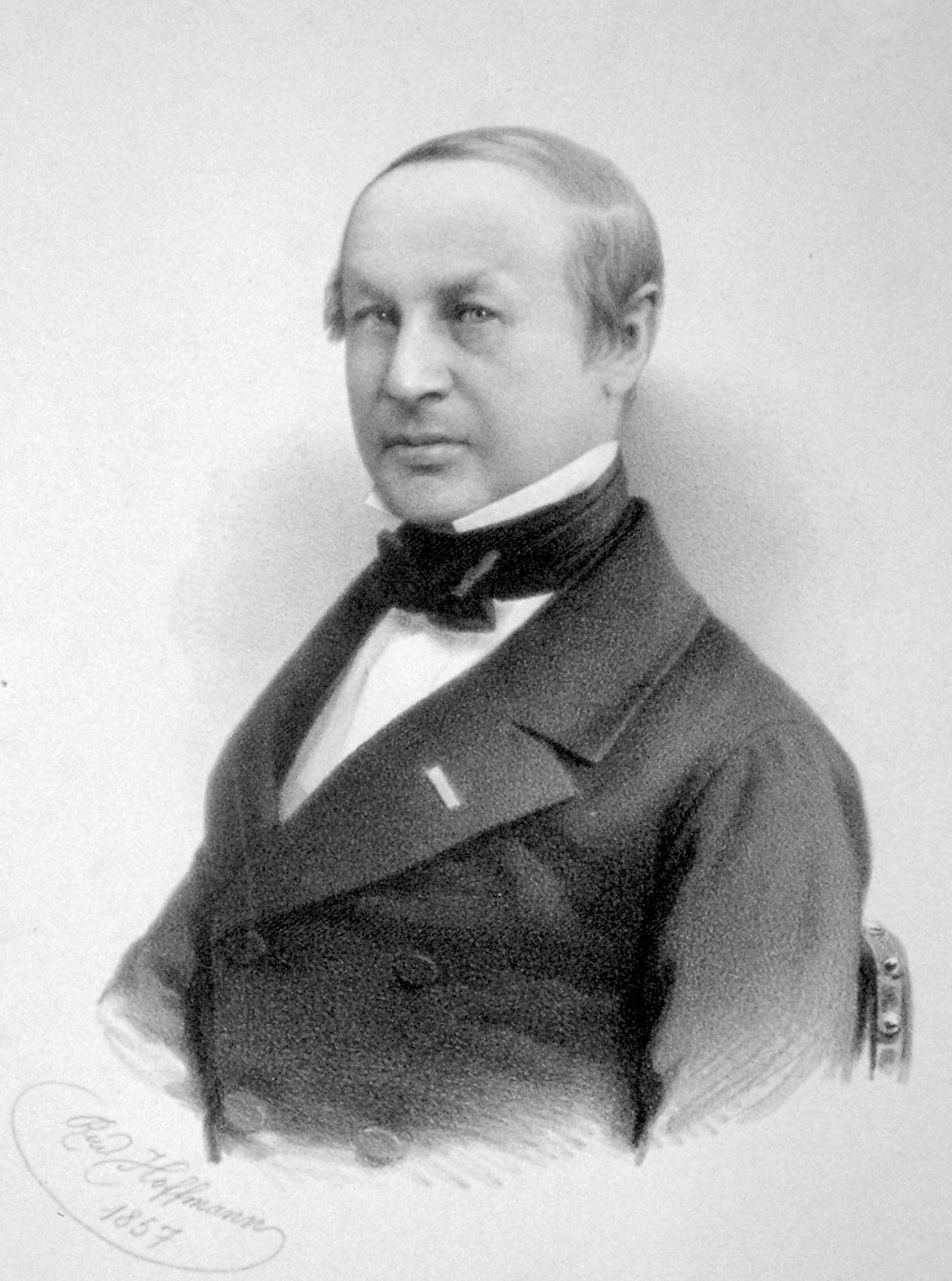
Theodor Schwann (1857)

- Hildegund (virgin) (1170–1188), saint
- Johann Pennarius (1517–1563), auxiliary bishop in Cologne
- Hermann Thyraeus (1532–1591), theologian and member of the Society of Jesus
- Peter Thyraeus (1546–1601), Jesuit, professor of theology in Würzburg
- Theodor Schwann (1810–1882), physiologist
- Franz Maria Feldhaus (1874–1957), technical historian and scientific writer
- Katharina von Oheimb (1879–1962), politician
- Josef Frings (1887–1978), Archbishop of the Archbishopric of Cologne
- Kurt Josten (1912–1994), German-British jurist, state official and resistance fighter
- Erik Martin (1936–2017), author, songwriter and editor
- Elke Aberle (born 1950), actress
- Friedhelm Funkel (born 1953), football player and coach
- Heike Hohlbein (born 1954), writer
- Jürgen P. Rabe (born 1955), physicist
- Norbert Hummelt (born 1962), writer
- Kai Böcking (born 1964), moderator
- Franziska Pigulla (1964–2019), actress, news presenter and voice actress
- Frank Biela (born 1964), racing driver
- Mónica Oltra (born 1969), Spanish politician, spokesperson and minister for Equality and Inclusive Policies of the Valencian government
- Thomas Rupprath (born 1977), swimmer
- Jochen Klenner (born 1978), politician
- Lars Börgeling (born 1979), pole vaulter
- Judith Flemig (born 1979), volleyball player
- Jawed Karim (born 1979), American entrepreneur, co-founder of YouTube; lived here c. 1981–1992
- Dirk Caspers (born 1980), former football player
- Niclas Kentenich (born 1988), racing driver
- Marcel Ohmann (born 1991), ice hockey player
- Danny da Costa (born 1993), footballer

== Twin towns – sister cities ==
Neuss is twinned with:

- Châlons-en-Champagne, France (1972)
- Pskov, Russia (1990)
- Rijeka, Croatia (1990)
- Saint Paul, United States (1999)
- Nevşehir, Turkey (2007)

== Gallery ==
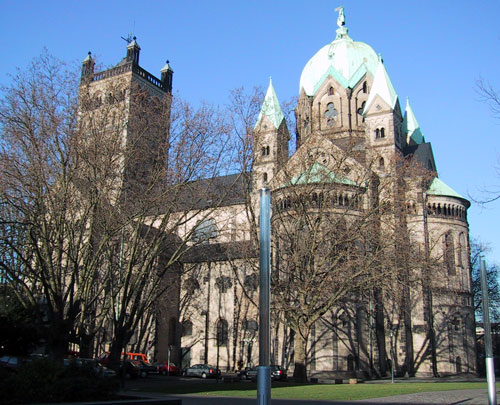
Saint Quirinus Minster

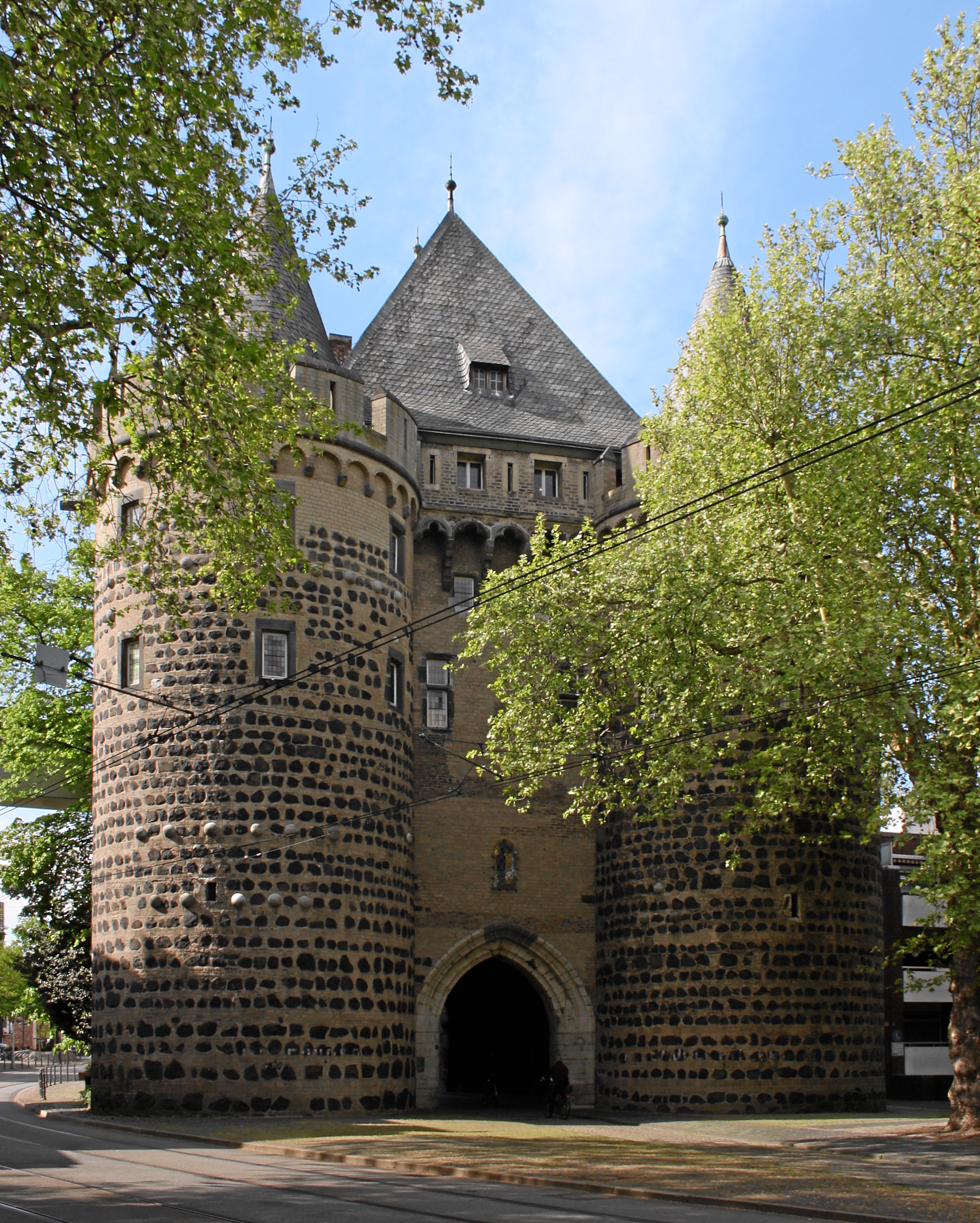
Obertor

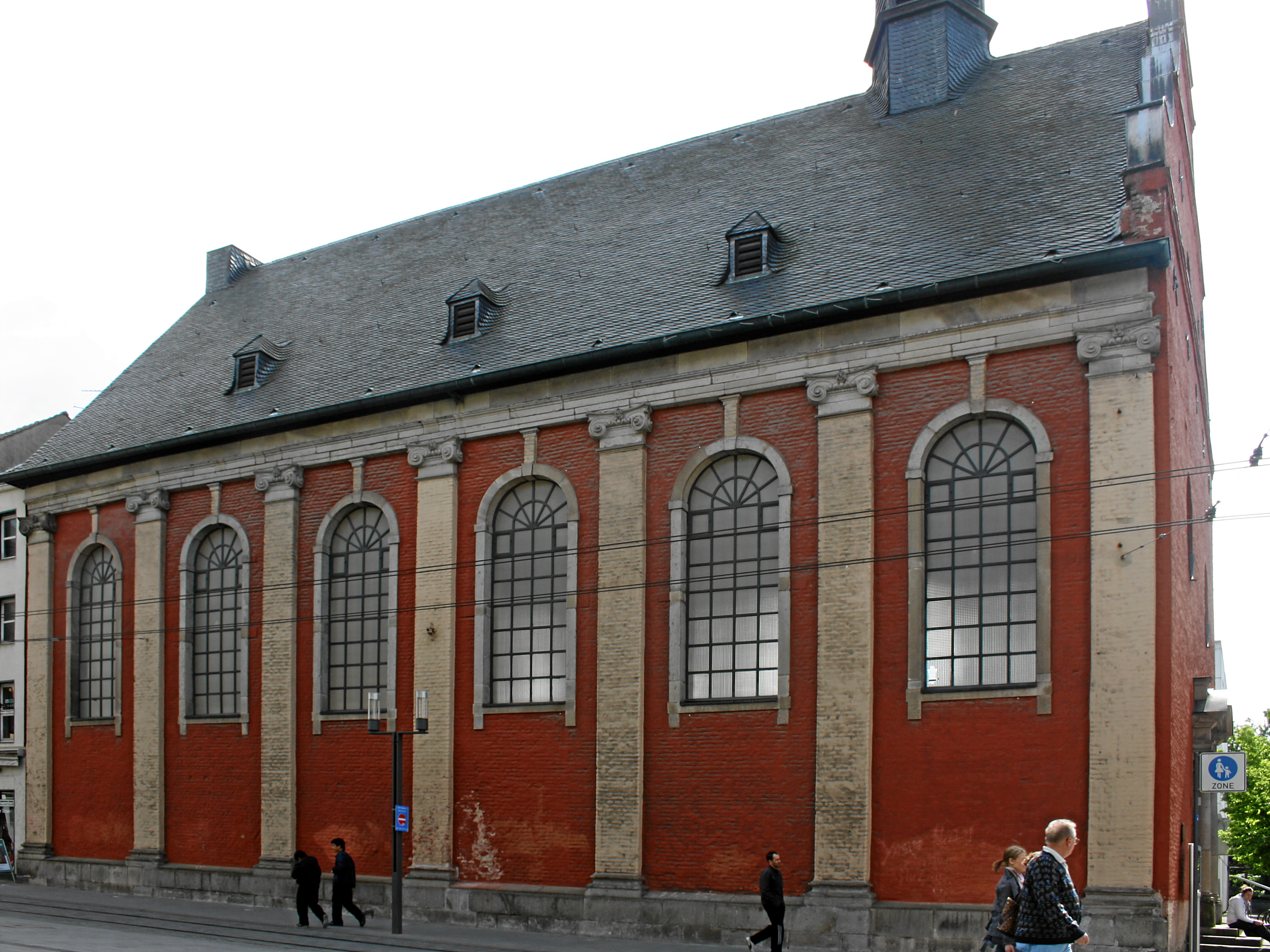
St. Sebastian Church

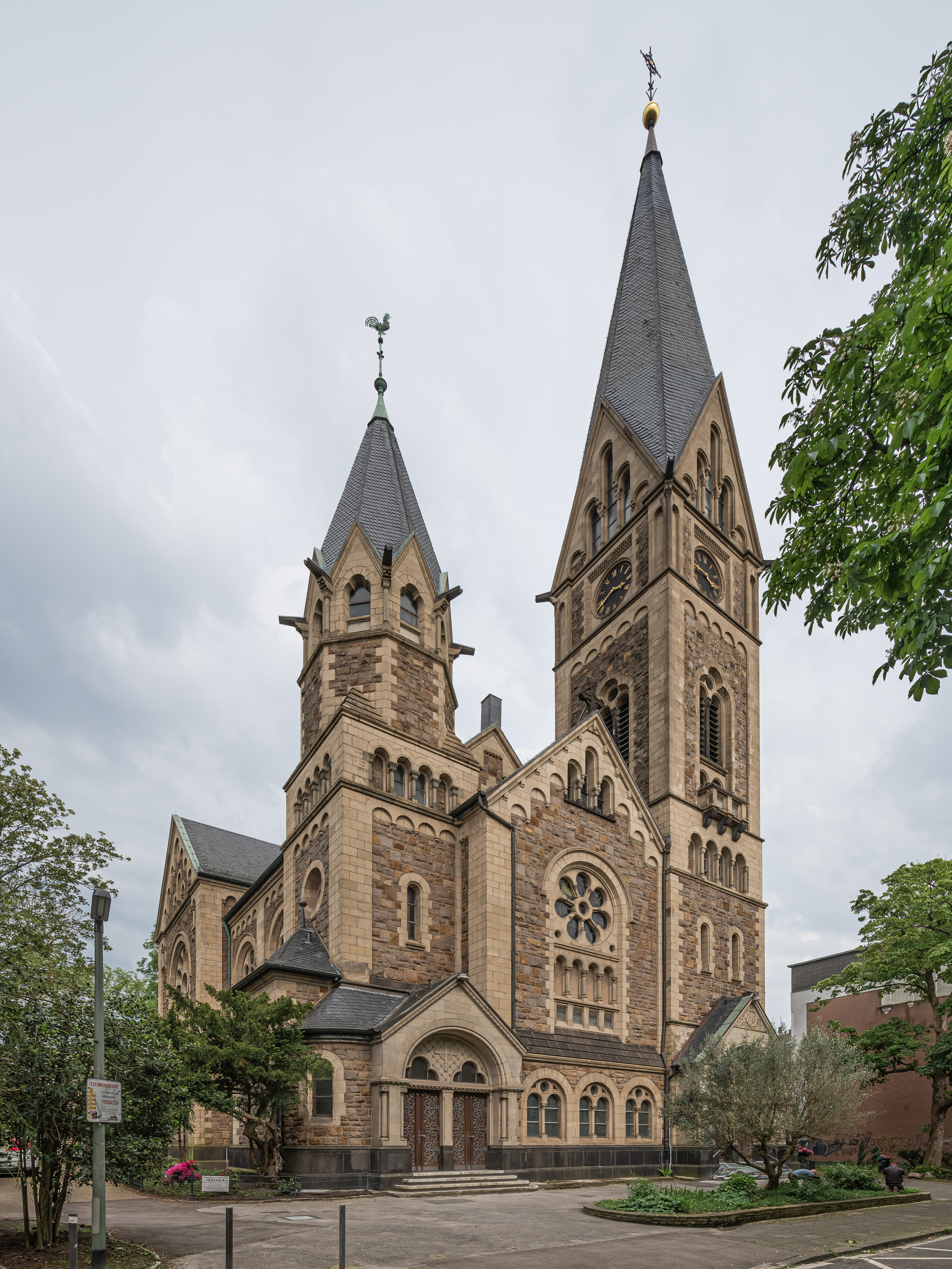
Christuskirche

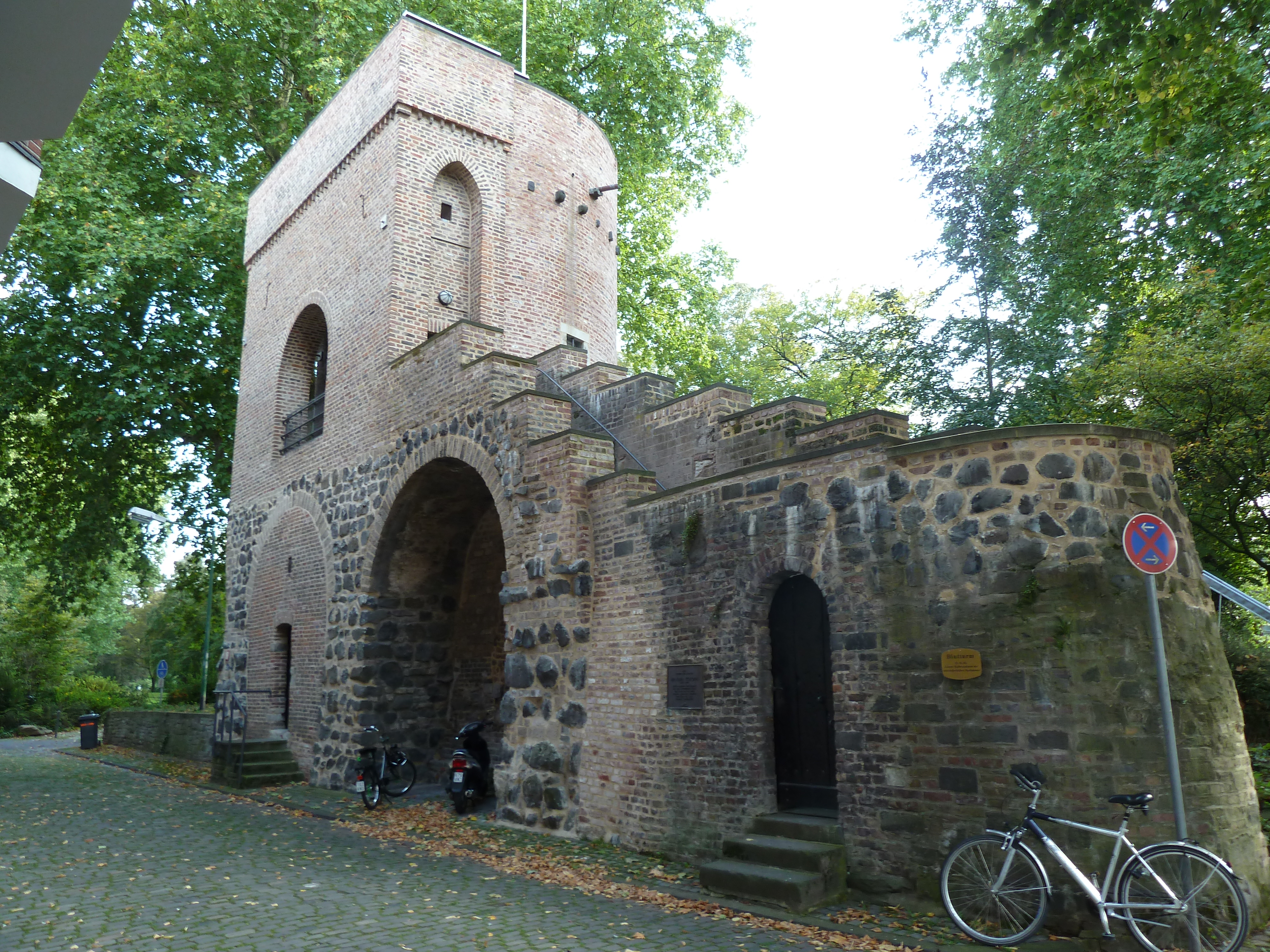
Blutturm
