= St. Sebastian (Neuss) =

Roman Catholic church in Neuss, Germany

Coordinates: 51.1997479°N 6.6892996°E

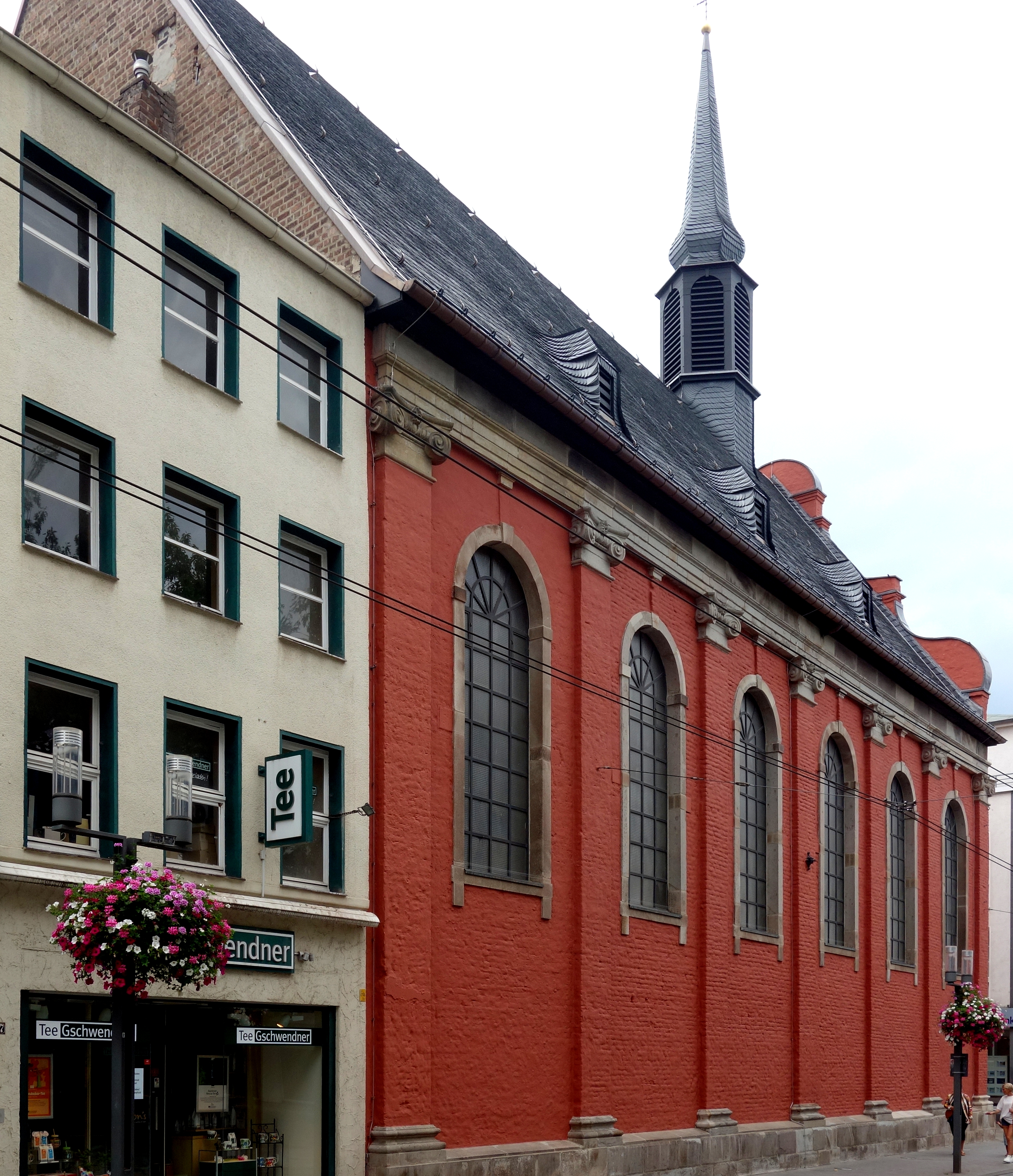
St. Sebastian

St. Sebastian is a Roman Catholic aisleless church in the city centre of Neuss in Nordrhein-Westfalen. It belongs to the Neuss parish St. Quirinus.

== History ==
The Sebastianuskirche was built between 1718 and 1720 by Superior Bernhard Schluns in Neuss's Altstadt. Until 1802 it belonged to an immediately neighboring Franciscan monastery. It served as a monastery church for the convent of the Third Order of Franciscans until it functioned as an auxiliary church to the Quirinus-Münster after secularisation.

The adjacent monastery initially served as a factory in 1803. From 1852, it became the Archiepiscopal Convict (Seminarium Marianum) and functioned as a municipal infirmary from 1873 to 1942.

During World War II, the former convent buildings were completely destroyed. Only the outer walls of St. Sebastian's Church remained intact. As a result, demolition of the building was considered, but thanks to the dedicated efforts of many citizens of Neuss, this was prevented. The church was rebuilt in 1955 and 1956 without the originally adjacent convict buildings. It was not until 1967 that a new monastery was constructed according to the plans of Cologne architect Joachim Schürmann, which housed the religious community of the Eucharistines until 1994. Today, the Missionaries Identes reside there.

== Equipment ==
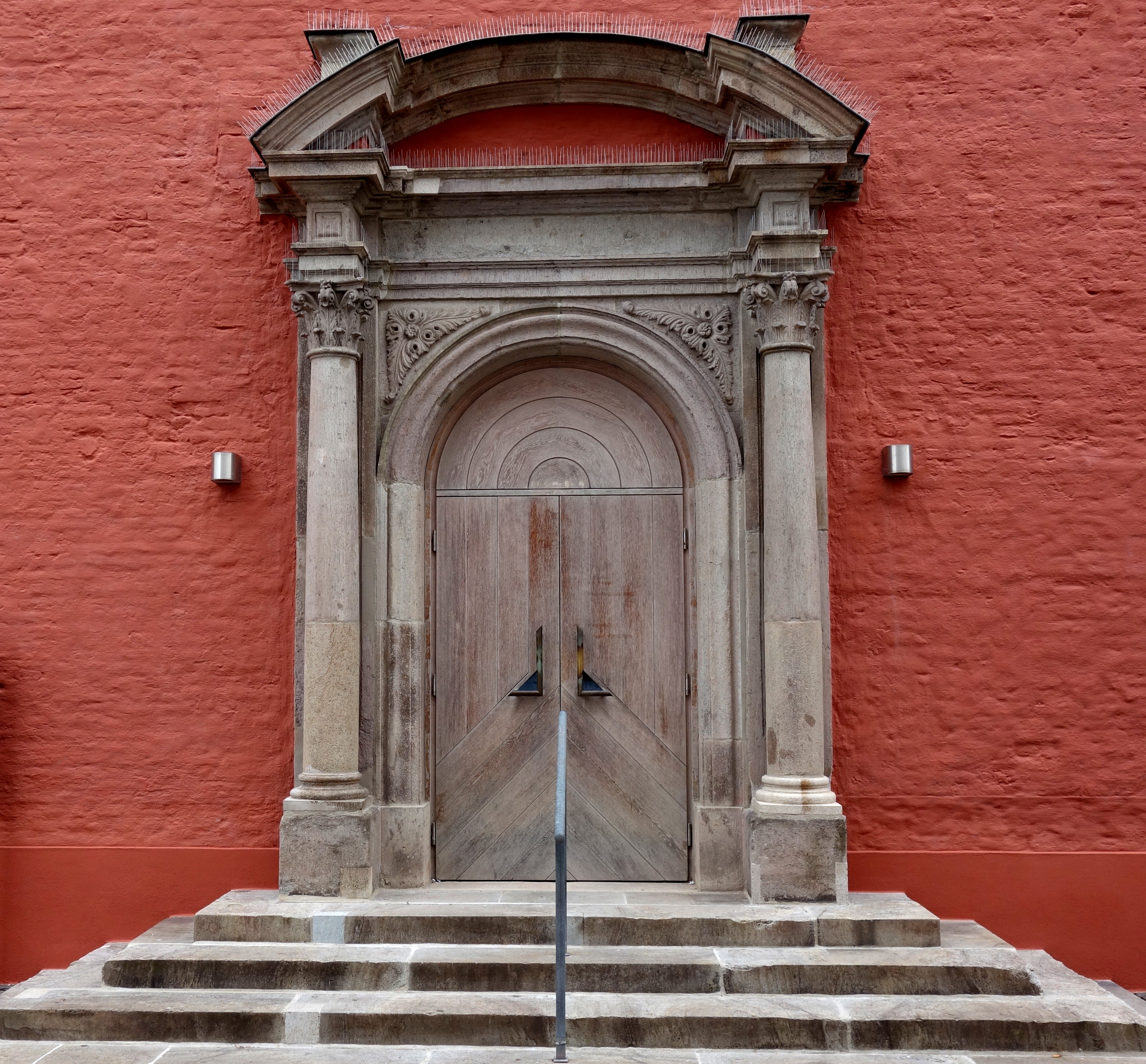
Entrance

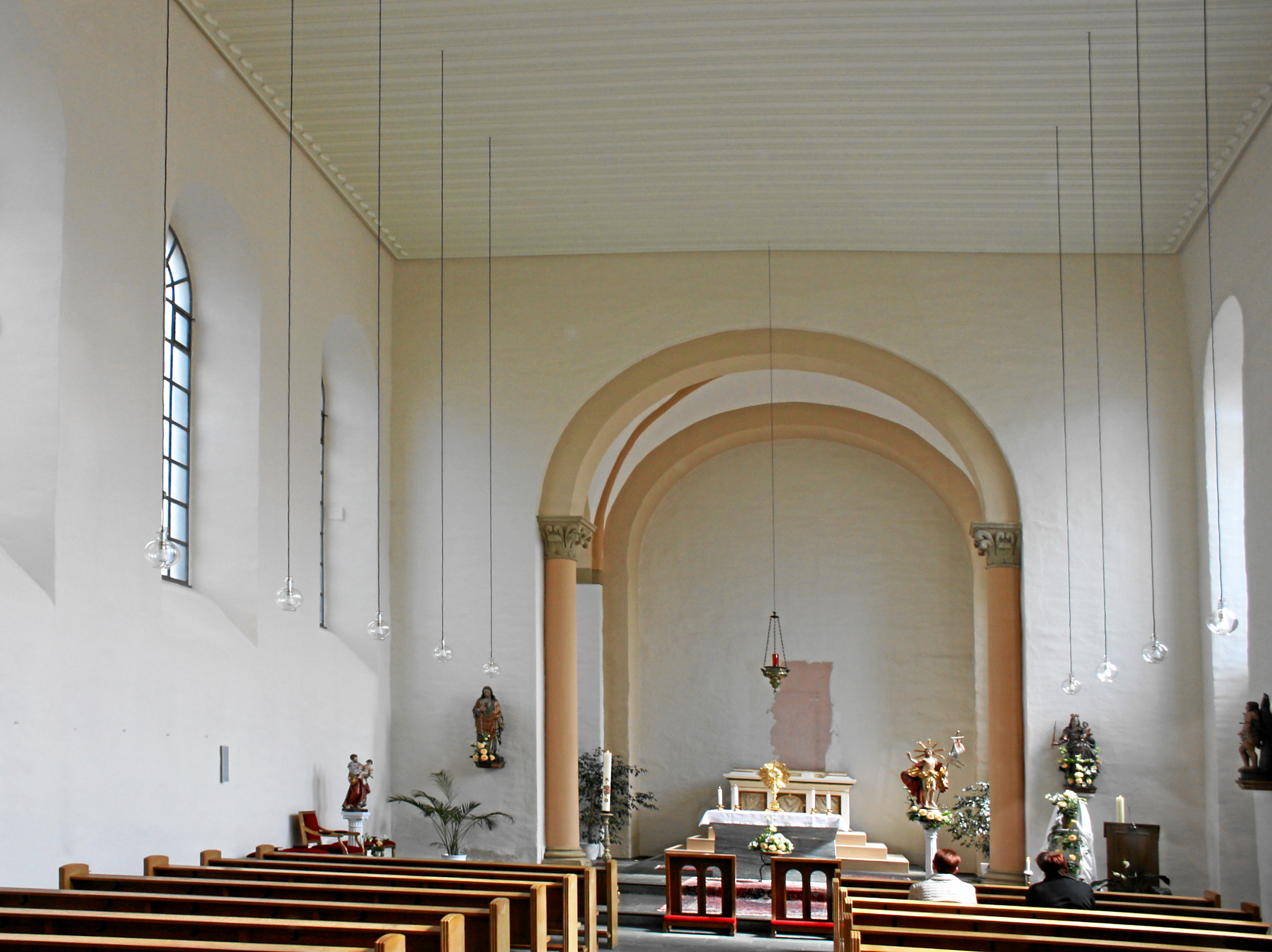
Inside

The original two-nave hall church was rebuilt as a single-nave structure after the destruction of World War II. Its entrance façade features a curved gable divided by four cornices, with round and oval windows, as well as a late Baroque entrance portal with shallow steps. On the long side, there are six tall round-arched windows framed by colossal Ionic pilasters. The upper section is completed by a gabled roof with a hexagonal roof turret.

The interior is covered by a flat wooden ceiling and features a rectangular chancel with two columns. The furnishings come from other churches or private donations. St. Sebastian received its Baroque high altar from the Basilica of St. Margareta in Düsseldorf-Gerresheim. Additionally, part of the interior decoration from a church demolished due to lignite mining is now housed in St. Sebastian's Church, including a Crucifixion group on the west wall and several other statues. A resident of Neuss donated an early Baroque carved figure of St. Sebastian. The representations of Mary and St. Quirinus are on loan from the parish of St. Quirin. On the interior wall facing the street, there is a Neo-Gothic Stations of the Cross from the 19th century.

== Building preservation ==
St. Sebastian's Church was added to the list of architectural monuments in Neuss on April 4, 1985.
