= Hermann Thyraeus =

German Jesuit theologian and preacher

Hermann Thyräus (b. at Neuss on the Rhine, 1532; d. at Mainz, 26 October 1591) was a German Jesuit theologian and preacher.

== Life ==
Thyräus studied first at Cologne. After 1522, he studied at the Collegium Germanicum at Rome, where he was a member of the first graduating class. On 26 May 1556, he was received into the Society of Jesus by Ignatius Loyola.

In the same year, Thyräus was made a professor of theology at Ingolstadt, where he taught for three years the "Magister sententiarum", and in the fourth year controversial theology. In 1560 he became a professor at Trier, and lectured on the Epistles of St. Paul. He was rector of the college at Trier from 1565 to 1570. There he became a noted preacher, drawing crowds of as many as 4000 listeners.

Thyräus was provincial of the Jesuit province of the Rhine from 1571 to 1578, where the archbishops often employed him in important matters. In 1574, he accompanied Daniel Brendel von Homburg, the archbishop of Mainz, to Duderstadt, where the city council was petitioning for permission to practice Lutheranism. Daniel refused the petition, instead enforcing the terms of the Augsburg Interim. Sermons Thyräus delivered during the visit were met with hostility and scorn.

From 1578 until his death, Thyräus served as rector of the college at Mainz.

== Works ==
The Liber de religionis libertate, ascribed to Thyräus, was written most probably by his younger brother Peter, also a Jesuit. His Confessio Augustana, with controversial notes, appeared at Dillingen in 1567. He also left several volumes of sermons.
