= Shakespeare-Festival Neuss =

Annual theatre festival in Neuss, Germany

Shakespeare Festival Neuss is an annual theatre festival in Neuss, Germany. It has taken place in a replica of the Globe Theatre on the grounds of the Neuss racecourse since 1991.

== Globe Neuss ==
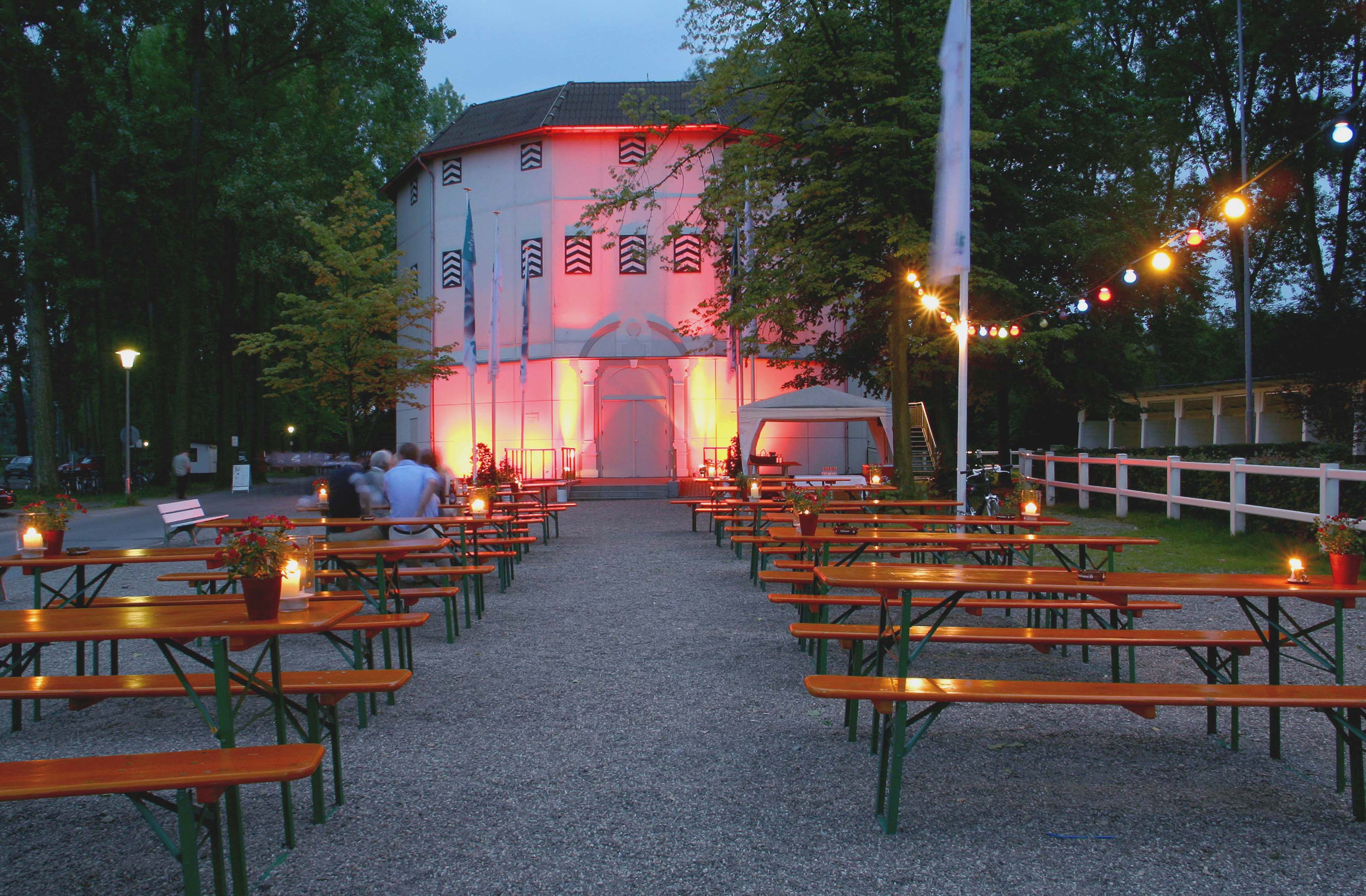
Globe Theatre Neuss

In 1988, a replica of the original London Globe Theatre was built for the Landesgartenschau (horticultural show of the state NRW) in Rheda-Wiedenbrück. Reinhard Schiele, a theatre-maker who, at the time, worked with the Schlosstheater Overhagen, had the initial idea and supervised the entire project. Schiele wanted it to be as true as possible to the original, so he planned a mobile travelling theatre built entirely out of wood. This dream had to be abandoned due to fire prevention regulations. The result was a dodecagonal theatre building made of a wood-and-steel construction that was no longer mobile. After the horticultural show ended, the theatre was not used for two years.

The city of Neuss and the ″Neusser Gemeinnützige Bauverein AG″ then acquired the building and rebuilt it on the grounds of the Neusser Galopprennbahn (racecourse) in 1991.

The multi-storey building, whose small windows are closed with black and white shutters, can accommodate about 500 spectators sitting on several levels. Not one seat is further than 10 meters apart from the stage. In the historical Globe Theatre there was virtually no seating at all but this would be unthinkable for today's audiences.

== Festival ==
The festival has been held annually since 1991. In 2016 it lasted for about a month during June and July joining theatres around the world in celebration of the 400th anniversary of Shakespeare's death. It is supervised by the cultural minister of the city of Neuss, as artistic director and production manager. The event is sponsored by a group called Friends of the Globe.

The festival features an annually changing program of up to 30 performances attracting approximately 15,000 visitors. A space utilization of 90 percent is achieved. The mixture of national and international ensembles, the works of Shakespeare, partly in Original language, perform on the simple stage without elaborate backdrops, offers both faithful productions as well as contemporary arrangements and unconventional interpretations. The regular participants include the Bremer Shakespeare Company and the Rheinische Landestheater Neuss.

== Programme ==
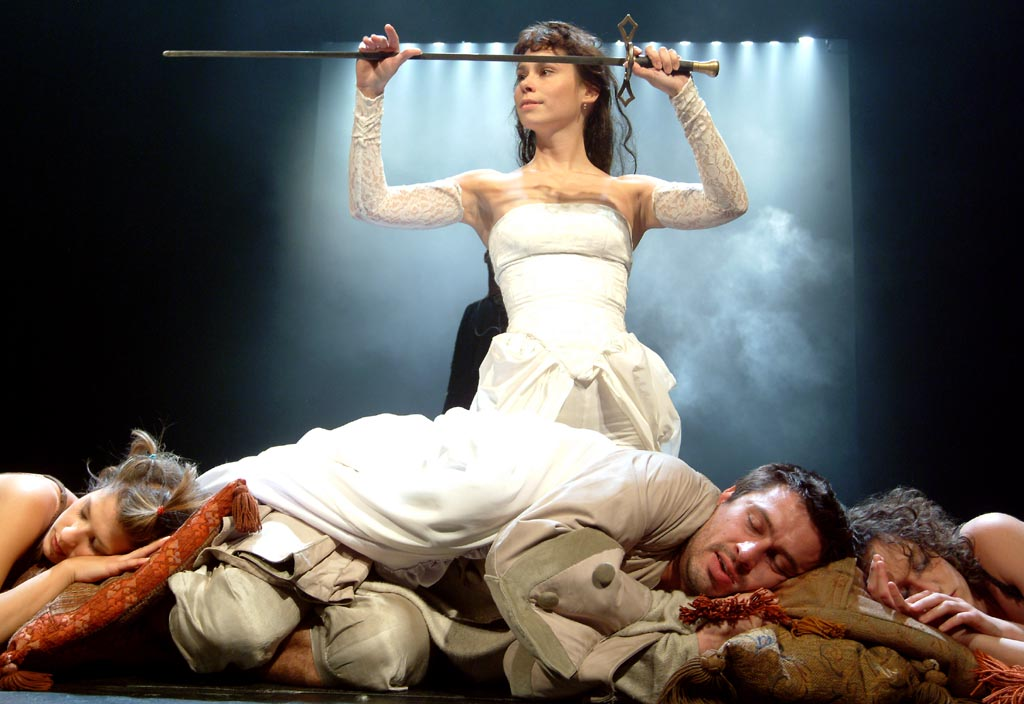
A Midsummer Night's Dream. Hungarian Burgtheater from Gyula in cooperation with the New Theater Budapest (2007)

- 1991: Bremer Shakespeare Company: The Taming of the Shrew, Antony and Cleopatra, The Tempest, and The Merry Wives of Windsor
- 1992: first appearances of The Medieval Players London, Indian dance company Keli, the Roma Pralipe Theater and the Rheinische Landestheater Neuss
- Since 1994, Patrick Spottiswoode has appeared on London's Shakespeare's Globe, which presents regular talks on "Shakespeare and the Globe"
- In addition to frequently played pieces, lesser known works and modern arrangements were also added to the programme. In 1996 the "Théâtre le Ranelagh" from Paris presented an early Italian model for "Romeo and Juliet" in 15 pantomime clown pictures, while the "Nossa Cara" theater group from Brazil presented a "street hamlet" in 1995.
- 2007: Semi-Operas of Henry Purcell: "The Tempest", "The Fairy Queen", and "King Arthur"; developed and performed by the Rheinische Landestheater in association with the Capella Piccola (a local choir specialised on Early Music) as well as the Metamorphosis ensemble and the academy for arts and media from Cologne
- 2012: originally Afghan Theater Rah-e Sabz ("Path of Hope") performed a modern adaptation of the Comedy of Errors in context of a country devastated by decades of civil and religious war where the search for family members is no longer a mere act of comedy. The group had to relocate to India since their rehearsal room fell victim to a bomb attack.
- also in 2012: Lithuanian director Oskaras Koršunovas introduced Miranda, a most unusual adaptation of Shakespeare's 'Tempest'.
