= Hülchrath =

Human settlement in Germany

Coordinates: 51°07′26″N 6°39′44″E

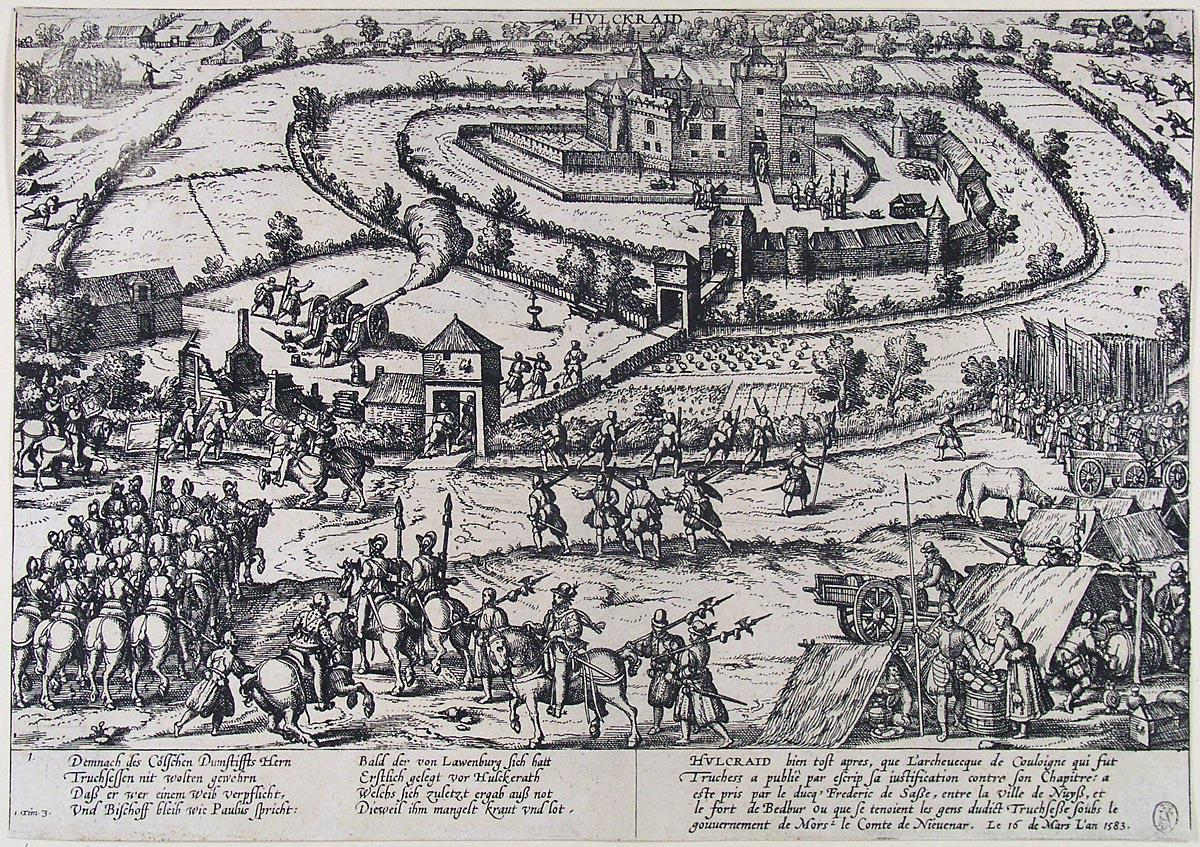
The destruction of Hülchrath in 1583 (Frans Hogenberg)

Hülchrath is a district of the municipality of Grevenbroich in North Rhine-Westphalia, Germany. It is known for its castle Schloss Hülchrath.

== Position ==
The community Hülchrath borders in the east on the strategic railway embankment and on the locality Neukirchen (Newchurch) (Grevenbroich).
