= Edward III (play) =

1596 play often attributed to Shakespeare

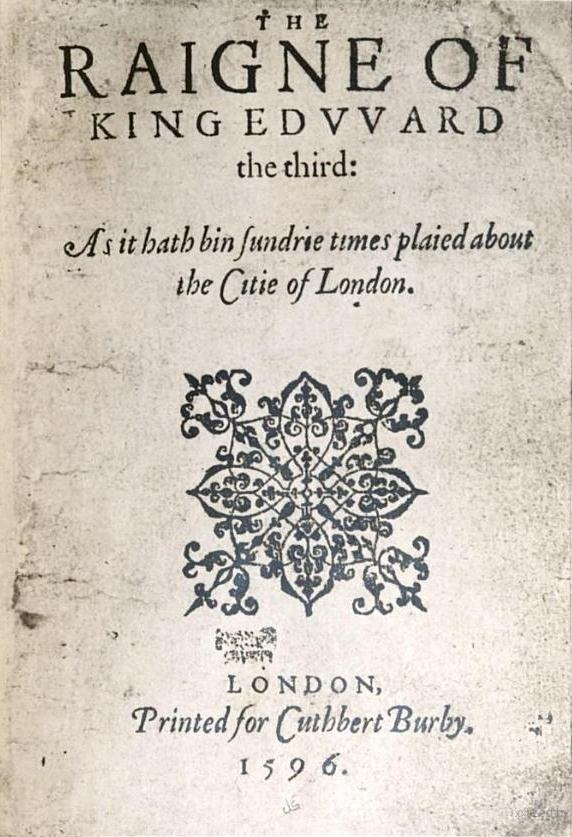
- Title page of the first quarto (1596)
- Original language: English
- Written by: possibly: William Shakespeare, Thomas Kyd and others
- Subject: King Edward III experiences personal and military struggles
- Genre: history play
- Setting: England and France (14th century)

Premiere
- Date: c. 1592

The Raigne of King Edward the Third, often shortened to Edward III, is an Elizabethan play that was printed anonymously in 1596. It is believed to have been partly written by William Shakespeare, but its inclusion in publications of the complete works of Shakespeare dates only to the late 1990s. Scholars supporting this attribution include Jonathan Bate, Edward Capell, Eliot Slater, Eric Sams, Giorgio Melchiori and Brian Vickers. The play's co-author remains the subject of debate and speculation; suggestions have included Thomas Kyd, Christopher Marlowe, Michael Drayton, Thomas Nashe and George Peele.

The play contains several gibes at Scotland and the Scottish people, which has led some critics to suggest that it incited George Nicholson, Queen Elizabeth's agent in Edinburgh, to protest against its portrayal of Scots on the London stage in a 1598 letter to William Cecil, Lord Burghley. This could explain why the play was not included in the First Folio of Shakespeare's works, published after the Scottish King James had succeeded to the English throne in 1603.

The play also contains an explicit reference to its having been produced not only for the stage, but also for the page. In the final sequence, the Black Prince states: "So that hereafter ages, when they read / The painful traffic of my tender youth, / Might thereby be inflamed" (scene 18).

== Characters ==
The English

- King Edward III
- Queen Philippa – his wife
- Edward, the Black Prince – their son
- Earl of Salisbury – partially based on Sir Walter de Manny; Salisbury was deceased by the events of the second half of the play.
- Countess of Salisbury – Salisbury's wife (although the story of Edward III's infatuation with her is based on an incident involving Alice of Norfolk, Salisbury's sister-in-law)
- Earl of Warwick – her father (fictitiously)
- Sir William Montague – Salisbury's nephew
- Earl of Derby
- Lord Audley – portrayed as an old man, though he was historically no older than 30 at the time of the play
- Lord Percy
- John Copland – esquire, later Sir John Copland
- Lodwick or Lodowick – King Edward's secretary
- Two Esquires
- Herald

Supporters of the English

- Robert, Count of Artois – partially based on Sir Godfrey de Harcourt; Artois was deceased by the events of the second half of the play
- Lord Mountford – Duke of Brittany
- Gobin de Grace – French prisoner

The French

- King John II – some of his actions in the play were actually undertaken by his predecessors King Charles IV and King Philip VI.
- Prince Charles – Duke of Normandy, his son
- Prince Philip – his youngest son (historically not yet born)
- Duke of Lorraine
- Villiers – Norman lord
- Captain of Calais
- Another Captain
- Mariner
- Three Heralds
- Two Citizens from Crécy
- Three other Frenchmen
- Woman with two children
- Six wealthy citizens of Calais
- Six poor citizens of Calais

Supporters of the French

- King of Bohemia
- Polonian Captain
- Danish troops

The Scots

- King David the Bruce of Scotland
- Sir William Douglas
- Two Messengers

There are several references made to "the Emperor". This is Louis IV, Holy Roman Emperor.

== Synopsis ==
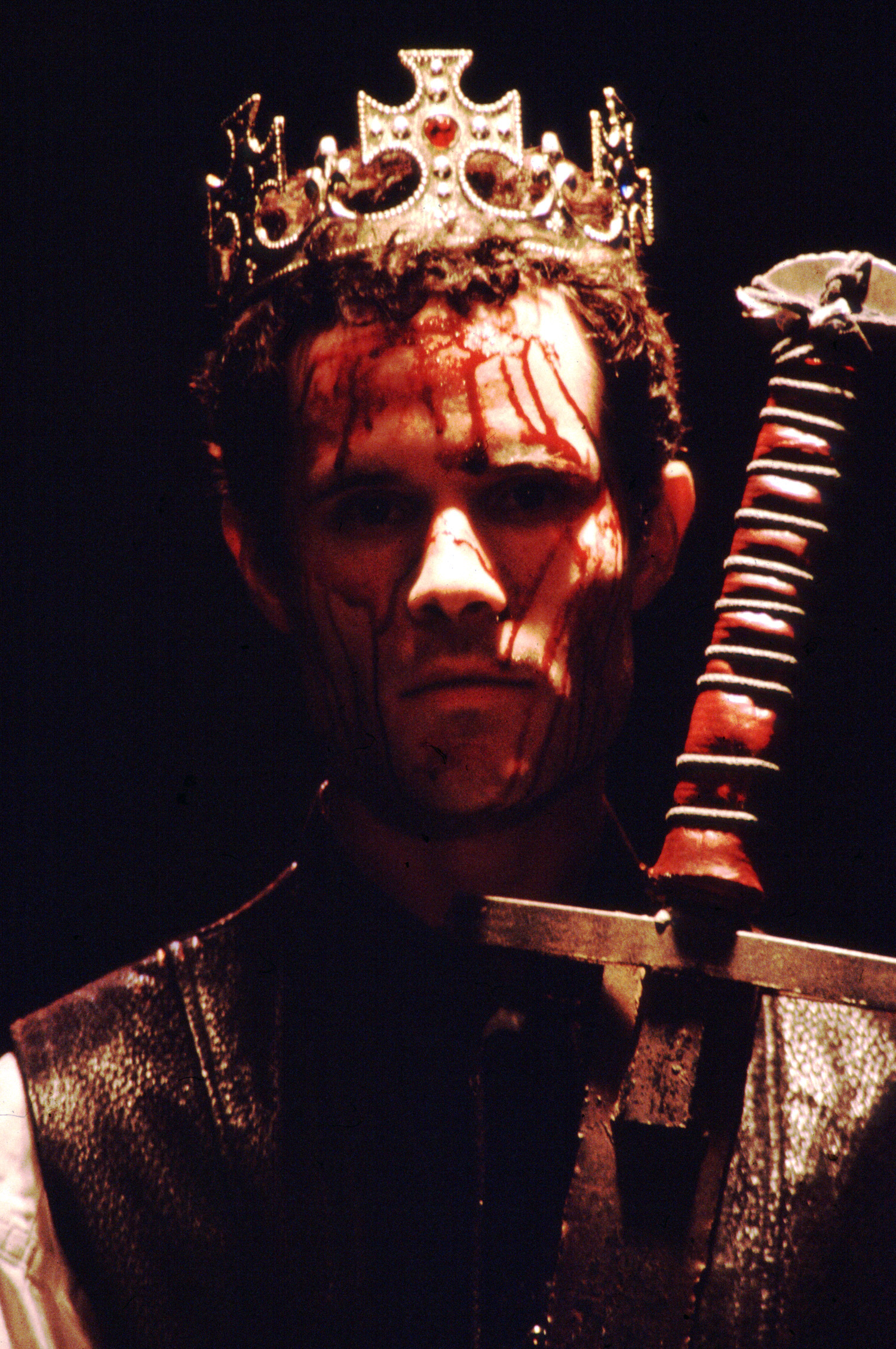
Edward the Black Prince (David Mendelsohn) in the American professional premiere of Edward III, staged by Pacific Repertory Theatre in August 2001

King Edward III is informed by the Count of Artois that he, Edward, was the true heir to the previous king of France. A French ambassador arrives to insist that Edward do homage to the new French king for his lands in Guyenne. Edward defies him, insisting he will invade to enforce his rights. A messenger arrives to say that the Scots are besieging a castle in the north of England. Edward decides to deal with this problem first. The castle is being held by the beautiful Countess of Salisbury, the wife of the Earl of Salisbury. As Edward's army arrives, the rampaging Scots flee. Edward immediately falls for the Countess, and proceeds to woo her for himself. She rebuffs him, but he persists. In an attempted bluff, the Countess vows to take the life of her husband if Edward will take the life of his wife. However, when she sees that Edward finds the plan morally acceptable, she ultimately threatens to take her own life if he does not stop his pursuit. Finally, Edward expresses great shame, admits his fault and acquiesces. He dedicates himself to use his energies to pursue his rights and duties as king.

In the second part of the play, Edward joins his army in France, fighting a war to claim the French throne. He and the French king exchange arguments for their claims before the Battle of Crécy. King Edward's son, Edward, the Black Prince, is knighted and sent into battle. The king refuses to send help to his son when it appears that the young man's life is in danger. Prince Edward proves himself in battle after defeating the king of Bohemia. The English win the battle and the French flee to Poitiers. Edward sends the prince to pursue them, while he besieges Calais.

In Poitiers the prince finds himself outnumbered and apparently surrounded. The play switches between the French and English camps, where the apparent hopelessness of the English campaign is contrasted with the arrogance of the French. Prince Edward broods on the morality of war before achieving victory in the Battle of Poitiers against seemingly insurmountable odds. He captures the French king.

In Calais the citizens realise they will have to surrender to King Edward. Edward demands that six of the leading citizens be sent out to face punishment. Edward's wife, Queen Philippa, arrives and persuades him to pardon them. Sir John Copland brings Edward the king of the Scots, captured in battle, and a messenger informs Edward that the English have secured Brittany. However, the successes are undercut when news arrives that Prince Edward was facing certain defeat at Poitiers. King Edward declares he will take revenge. Prince Edward arrives with news of his victory, bringing with him the captured French king. The English enter Calais in triumph.

== Sources ==
Like most of Shakespeare's history plays, the source is Raphael Holinshed's Chronicles, while Jean Froissart's Chronicles is also a major source for this play. Roger Prior has argued that the playwright had access to Lord Hunsdon's personal copy of Froissart and quoted some of Hunsdon's annotations. A significant portion of the part usually attributed to Shakespeare, the wooing of the Countess of Salisbury, is based on the tale "The Countesse of Salesberrie" (no. 46) in the story-collection Palace of Pleasure by William Painter. Painter's version of the story, derived from Froissart, portrays Edward as a bachelor and the Countess as a widow, and concludes with the couple marrying. Painter's preface indicates that he knew that this was "altogether untrue", since Edward had only one wife, "the sayde vertuous Queene Philip", but reproduces Froissart's version with all its "defaults". The author of the play is aware that both were married at the time. Melchiori (p. 104) points out the similarity of the playwright's language to that of Painter in spite of the plotting differences.

The play radically compresses the action and historical events, placing the Battle of Poitiers (1356) immediately after the Battle of Crecy (1346), and before the capture of Calais. In fact, Poitiers took place ten years after the earlier victory and capture of Calais. The compression necessitates that characters are merged. Thus the French king throughout the play is John II of France. In fact, Crecy had been fought against his predecessor, Philip VI of France. Many other characters are freely depicted at events when they could not have been present. William Montague, 1st Earl of Salisbury and John de Montfort were both dead even before Crecy. While Sir John Copland did capture the Scottish King David and bring him to Calais in 1346, shortly after Crecy, complete Anglo-Montfort victory in Brittany, alluded in the same scene, was not achieved until the Battle of Auray in 1364.

The author or authors of The Reign of King Edward III also used John Eliot’s 1591 translation of Bertrand de Loque’s Discourses of Warre and single Combat for inspiration and guidance.

== Authorship ==
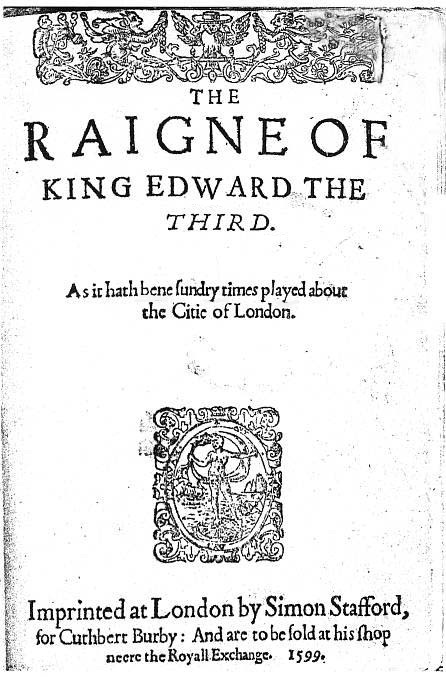
The 1599 Second Quarto of the play

Edward III has only been accepted into the canon of plays written by Shakespeare since the 1990s. In 1596, it was published anonymously, which was common practice in the 1590s (the first Quarto editions of Titus Andronicus and Richard III also appeared anonymously). Additionally, Elizabethan theatre often paid professional writers of the time to perform minor additions and emendations to problematic or overly brief scripts (the additions to the popular but brief Doctor Faustus and Shakespeare's own additions on the unperformed Sir Thomas More being some of the best known). No holographic manuscript of Edward III is extant.

The principal arguments against Shakespeare's authorship are its non-inclusion in the First Folio of Shakespeare's plays in 1623 and being unmentioned in Francis Meres's Palladis Tamia (1598), a work that lists many (but not all) of Shakespeare's early plays. Some critics view the play as not up to the quality of Shakespeare's ability, and they attribute passages resembling his style to imitation or plagiarism. Despite this, many critics have seen some passages as having an authentic Shakespearean ring. In 1760, noted Shakespearean editor Edward Capell included the play in his Prolusions; or, Select Pieces of Ancient Poetry, Compil'd with great Care from their several Originals, and Offer'd to the Publicke as Specimens of the Integrity that should be Found in the Editions of worthy Authors, and concluded that it had been written by Shakespeare. However, Capell's conclusion was, at the time, only supported by mostly German scholars.

In recent years, professional Shakespeare scholars have increasingly reviewed the work with a new eye, and have concluded that some passages are as sophisticated as any of Shakespeare's early histories, especially King John and the Henry VI plays. In addition, passages in the play are direct quotes from Shakespeare's sonnets, most notably the line "lilies that fester smell far worse than weeds" (sonnet 94) and the phrase "scarlet ornaments", used in sonnet 142.

Stylistic analysis has also produced evidence that at least some scenes were written by Shakespeare. (Note: Thomas Merriam's article in Literary and Linguistic Computing vol 15 (2) 2000: 157–186 uses stylometry to investigate claims that the play is a reworking by Shakespeare of a draft originally written by Marlowe.) In the 1987 Textual Companion to the first edition of the The Oxford Shakespeare, Gary Taylor states that "of all the non-canonical plays, Edward III has the strongest claim to inclusion in the Complete Works." (The play was subsequently edited by William Montgomery and included in the second edition of the Oxford Complete Works in 2005.) The first major publishing house to produce an edition of the play was Yale University Press, in 1996; Cambridge University Press published an edition two years later as part of its New Cambridge Shakespeare series. Since then, an edition of the Riverside Shakespeare has included the play, as has the Arden Shakespeare in its Third Series (2017).

Giorgio Melchiori, editor of the New Cambridge edition, asserts that the play's disappearance from the canon is probably due to a 1598 protest at the play's portrayal of the Scottish. According to Melchiori, scholars have often assumed that this play, the title of which was not stated in the letter of 15 April 1598 from George Nicolson (Elizabeth I's Edinburgh agent) to Lord Burghley noting the public unrest, was a comedy (one that does not survive), but the play's portrayal of Scots is so virulent that it is likely that the play was banned—officially or unofficially—and left forgotten by Heminges and Condell.

The events and monarchs in the play would, along with the two history tetralogies and Henry VIII, extend Shakespeare's chronicle to include all the monarchs from Edward III to Shakespeare's near-contemporary Henry VIII. Some scholars, notably Eric Sams, have argued that the play is entirely by Shakespeare, but today, scholarly opinion is divided, with many researchers asserting that the play is an early collaborative work, of which Shakespeare wrote only a few scenes.

In 2009, Brian Vickers published the results of a computer analysis using a program designed to detect plagiarism, which suggests that 40% of the play was written by Shakespeare with the other scenes written by Thomas Kyd (1558–1594). John Jowett and Richard Proudfoot and Nicola Bennett, while not rejecting the possibility of Kyd's authorship, find that the evidence is insufficient. Citing Jowett's Shakespeare and the Text, Proudfoot and Bennett identify multiple assumptions made in the attribution, crediting the first three to Jowett: that Kyd's known oeuvre (consisting of only The Spanish Tragedy, Soliman and Perseda, and an English translation of French playwright Robert Garnier's Cornélie) is a sufficient body of evidence for comparison, that "rarity" of n-gram patterns is definable and doubtlessly characteristic, and that scenes within collaborative plays are always by one author acting alone. Proudfoot and Bennett add to these that selection bias prejudges outcome, making the methodology only somewhat more sophisticated than "parallel passage" strategies of old despite the inclusion of more text in the analysis. They cite in-progress work by Martin Mueller to digitally analyse 548 plays published between 1562 and 1662 for n-grams, but also note that some playwrights and plays of the era are known only by their names, that anonymous plays could be written by authors whose work is unknown to scholars of drama of the period, and that there was a dramatic increase in the publication of plays starting in 1593, when the practice became normalised for successful plays. Based on Mueller's work, the top ten plays with n-gram links to Edward III range from 6% to 4%:

1. Henry VI, Part 3 (Shakespeare)
2. Edward II (Marlowe)
3. Henry VI, Part 1 (Shakespeare, possibly with Thomas Nashe, Kyd, and/or Marlowe)
4. Alphonsus, King of Aragon (Robert Greene)
5. Richard III (Shakespeare)
6. Tamburlaine, Part 1 (Marlowe)
7. King John (Shakespeare)
8. A Knack to Know a Knave (anonymous)
9. Tamburlaine, Part 2 (Marlowe)
10. The Massacre at Paris (Marlowe)

This suggests to them that genre is more significant than author. They also note that Kyd's plays do not score that high on Mueller's scale, The Spanish Tragedy at 24th, Soliman and Perseda at 33rd, and Cornelia at 121st. They also note that Vickers was working on a wider project to expand the canon of Kyd to include Edward III, Arden of Faversham, Fair Em, King Leir, and parts of Henry VI, Part 1. Marcus Dahl did n-gram research on Nashe's works and found seven links in Summer's Last Will and Testament, 24 links in Christ's Tears Over Jerusalem, thirteen links in The Unfortunate Traveller, and four links in The Terrors of the Night. Proudfoot and Bennett argue that Nashe's access to the library of Sir Robert Cotton, 1st Baronet, of Connington, would have given Nashe access to Froissart and other sources of the play. They note that the only reference to Froissart in all of Shakespeare's canonical work is in the first act of Henry VI, Part 1, which many scholars now attribute to Nashe. Nashe was known primarily as a playwright, but Summer's Last Will and Testament is his only theatrical work of undisputed authorship still extant. Proudfoot and Bennett also suggest that Nashe's possible co-authorship need not have been dialogue writing, but structuring the plot. "It will be apparent", they write, however,

that the attempt to identify Nashe as a putative partner in writing Edward III is wholly conjectural, anchored to the few known facts of his familiarity with Froissart and perhaps by phrasal links with the verbal text of Edward III. If this hypothesis has any interest, then it may be in confronting the question of how the selection of material from Froissart for Edward III came to be as it is and not otherwise. The fact that it is purely speculative may serve to illustrate the tantalising gap that remains between the playtext that has survived and the attempt to locate it among what little is known of the writers and players who brought it into being.

Charles R. Forker's analysis of The Troublesome Reign of John, King of England (2011) assesses that anonymous play as being by George Peele, and Edward III as stylistically different from that of Peele. Nevertheless, Tucker Brooke identified Peele as the author of Edward III in 1908, and Lois Potter did so in 2012. "Any case for Peele", write Proudfoot and Bennett, "would take as its point of departure the fact that his known plays share several concerns with Edward III: David and Bethsabe revolves around adulterous love and its consequences; the action of Edward I dramatises the creation of the title of Prince of Wales (of which the Black Prince was only the third holder); while The Battle of Alcazar dramatises sixteenth-century warfare—the anachronistic model for the battle narratives in Edward III, with their pikes and naval gunnery."

Proudfoot and Bennett's arguments, particularly those pertaining to statistical analysis of n-grams, are countered by Darren Freebury-Jones, who provides a sustained analysis of the evidence in favour of Shakespeare and Thomas Kyd as direct collaborators.

Harold Bloom rejected the theory that Shakespeare wrote Edward III, on the grounds that he found "nothing in the play is representative of the dramatist who had written Richard III".

In October 2026, Rory Loughnane of the University of Kent and Brett Greatley-Hirsch, a professor of Renaissance Literature and Textual Studies at the University of Leeds, reported that computerised linguistic textual analysis, to be published in the Shakespeare Quarterly later in 2026, showed "beyond any reasonable doubt" that Shakespeare was the main writer and Marlowe was a collaborator.

=== Attributions ===
- William Shakespeare – Edward Capell (1760)
- George Peele – Tucker Brooke (1908)
- Christopher Marlowe, with Robert Greene, George Peele, and Thomas Kyd – J. M. Robertson (1924)
- Michael Drayton – E. A. Gerard (1928)
- Robert Wilson – S. R. Golding (1929)
- William Shakespeare – A. S. Cairncross (1935)
- Michael Drayton – H. W. Crundell (1939)
- Thomas Kyd – William Wells (1940)
- Thomas Kyd – Guy Lambrechts (1963)
- Robert Greene – R. G. Howarth (1964)
- Thomas Heywood – Moelwyn Merchant (1967) (Note: Merchant's introduction to the New Mermaids edition of Marlowe's Edward the Second (Hill and Wang, 1967) twice mentions Heywood as the author of Edward III (xvii, xxiv).)
- William Shakespeare – Eliot Slater (1988)
- William Shakespeare and one other – Jonathan Hope (1994)
- William Shakespeare and Christopher Marlowe – Robert A. J. Matthews and Thomas V. N. Merriam (1994)
- William Shakespeare – Eric Sams (1996)
- William Shakespeare and others (not Marlowe) – Giorgio Melchiori (1998) (Note: Melchiori (p. 35) dismisses the Marlovian character of the play as having been written under the influence of Marlowe's Tamburlaine, Part II, which was recent and popular enough to be fresh in the memory of theatre-goers during the period in which Edward III was written. Melchiori does not believe that the play is entirely Shakespeare's, but he does not attempt to determine whose the other hands in the play are. He also voices his dislike of the publication of the "hand D" segments of Sir Thomas More out of context in many complete Shakespeare editions (ix).)
- Christopher Marlowe (Acts I, III, and V) and William Shakespeare (Acts II and IV) – Thomas Merriam (2000)
- Thomas Kyd (60%) and William Shakespeare (40%) – Brian Vickers (2009)
- George Peele – Lois Potter (2012)
- William Shakespeare (Scenes 2, 3, and 12) and others (principal consideration is given to Marlowe, Kyd, Peele and Thomas Nashe, but qualified as "purely speculative" and insisting that even Shakespeare's involvement is conjectural) – Richard Proudfoot and Nicola Bennett (2017)
- Thomas Kyd and William Shakespeare – Darren Freebury-Jones (2022)
- William Shakespeare (principal) and Christopher Marlowe (collaborator) – Rory Loughnane and Brett Greatley-Hirsch (2026)

== Performance history ==
The first modern performance of the play was on 6 March 1911, when the Elizabethan Stage Society performed Act 2 at the Little Theatre in London. Following this, the BBC broadcast an abridged version of the play in 1963, with complete performances taking place in Los Angeles in 1986 (as part of a season of Shakespeare Apocrypha) and Mold in 1987.

In 1977, the play was incorporated into the marathon BBC Radio dramatic series Vivat Rex as Episodes Three: "Obsession" and Four: "The Black Prince" with Keith Michell as Edward III, Christopher Neame as Edward the Black Prince and Richard Burton as the narrator.

In 1998, Cambridge University Press became the first major publisher to produce an edition of the play under Shakespeare's name, and shortly afterward the Royal Shakespeare Company performed the play (to mixed reviews).

The American premiere of Edward III was staged by Pacific Repertory Theatre as part of the company's Carmel Shakespeare Festival in 2001.

In 2002, the Royal Shakespeare Company's production was performed as part of a season of little done plays by Shakespeare's contemporaries along with such titles as The Roman Actor by Philip Massinger and Eastward Ho by Ben Jonson. The production was directed by Anthony Clarke and starred David Rintoul as King Edward and Caroline Faber as the Countess. It was performed at the Swan Theatre in Stratford-upon-Avon, a venue known for tackling more non-mainstream titles. The production mixed costuming and set elements that included medieval armor and weaponry with 19th century style military uniforms.

In 2009, director Donna Northcott of St. Louis Shakespeare produced a traditionally set production on a multi-tiered set at the Orthwein Theater.

In 2011, the Atlanta Shakespeare Company presented a production in repertory with The Two Noble Kinsmen at their Shakespeare Tavern Theater. In his director's note, Director Troy Willis stressed the various elements of honor and chivalry found in the play were often taught to the nobility by characters who were lower in social station than themselves. This is notable in the Countess instructing King Edward and Audley instructing the young prince.

In 2014, the Hawai'i Shakespeare Festival (HSF) presented an anime/video game style production that was notable for using dancers as stand ins for King Edward and King John as they controlled the dancers from the sides of the stage.

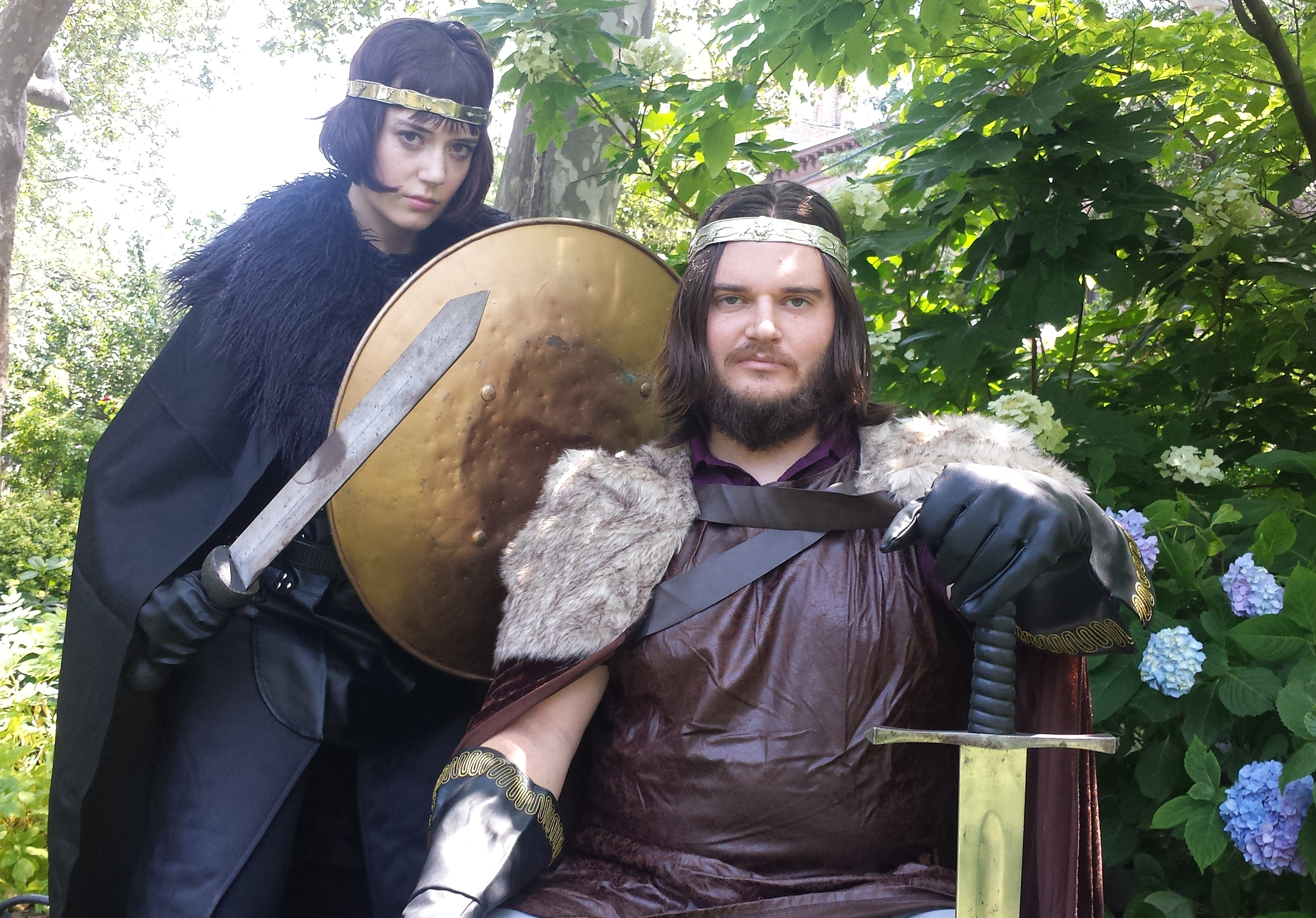
Rhiannon Lattimer as Ned the Black Prince, with Ben Forer as his father Edward III, in Hudson Shakespeare Company's production of King Edward III

In 2016, the Hudson Shakespeare Company presented a production as part of their Shakespeare in the Park series and their history cycle treatment of Shakespeare's second or major cycle producing it along with Richard II and Henry IV, Part 1 and Henry IV, Part 2. As Edward III takes place two generations before Richard II, which was done in a late medieval style, Edward III was placed in an early medieval/Viking setting to depict an earlier time. Other notable features included by Artistic Director Jon Ciccarelli were a Viking party scene that bridged the Edward-Countess meeting scene with the Lodowick monologue and included an historical dramatization of Edward's founding of the "Order of the Garter" stressing the mutual attraction between Edward (Ben Forer) and the Countess (Rachel Matusewicz).

In 2016, The Flock Theater in New London, Connecticut, featured a decidedly older King Edward and much younger Countess.

In 2016, the Chicago Shakespeare Theater presented Edward III as part of a 3-play history cycle that included Henry V and Henry VI, Part 1. The cycle was called Tug of War: Foreign Fire and concluded in a follow-up cycle called Tug of War: Civil Strife which included Henry VI, Part 2, Henry VI, Part 3 and Richard III.

== See also ==
- Shakespeare Apocrypha
