= Dumbshow =

Form of English pantomime

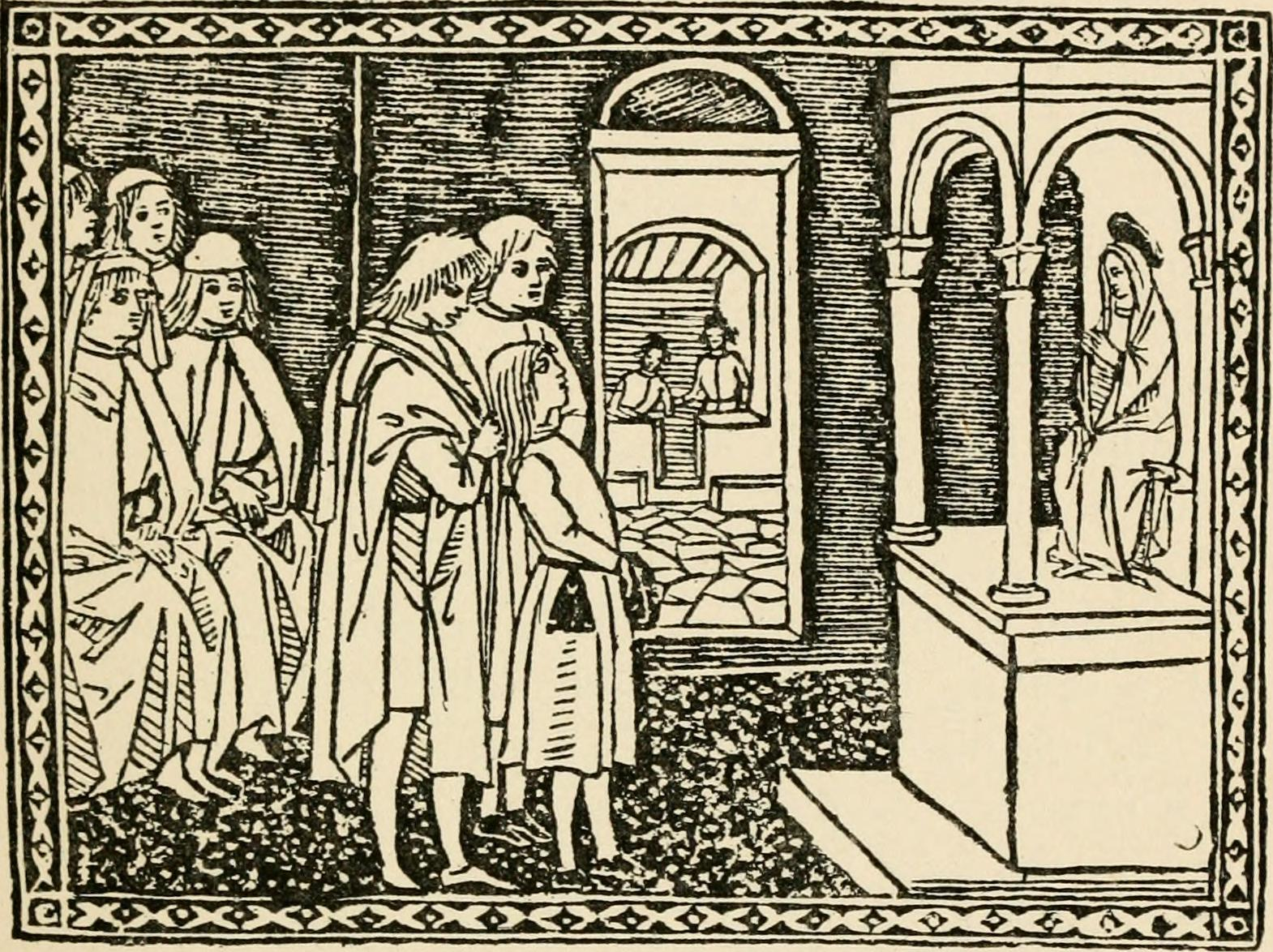
Pantomime or dumb-show

Dumbshow, also dumb show or dumb-show, is defined by the Oxford Dictionary of English as "gestures used to convey a meaning or message without speech; mime." In the theatre the word refers to a piece of dramatic mime in general, or more particularly a piece of action given in mime within a play "to summarise, supplement, or comment on the main action".

In the Oxford Encyclopedia of Theatre and Performance, Michael Dobson writes that the dumbshow was originally "an allegorical survival from the morality play". It came into fashion in 16th-century English drama in interludes featuring "personifications of abstract virtues and vices who contend in ways which foreshadow and moralize the fortunes of the play's characters".

There are examples in Gorboduc (1561) throughout which dumbshow plays a major part, and in Thomas Kyd's The Spanish Tragedy (1580s), George Peele's The Battle of Alcazar (1594) and The Old Wives' Tale (1595), Robert Greene's Friar Bacon and Friar Bungay (1594) and the anonymous A Warning for Fair Women (1599).

Shakespeare used dumbshow in Hamlet, for the play within a play staged by Prince Hamlet and the players for King Claudius. That, like Revenge's dumbshow in The Spanish Tragedy, suggests by mime the action soon to take place in the main spoken drama. In Dobson's view the dumbshow was becoming old-fashioned by Shakespeare's time, and the playwright's most elaborate dumbshows are in Pericles, Prince of Tyre, a play intentionally constructed in "a mock-medieval dramatic idiom".

In the 17th century, dumbshow survived as an element of the courtly masque. The Jacobean tragedies of Webster and Middleton dumbshows are featured in masque-within-the-play episodes. From the 1630s the dumbshow no longer featured in mainstream British drama, but it resurfaced in harlequinades, pantomimes and melodramas in the 19th century.

Thomas Holcroft introduced a dumb character in his play A Tale of Mystery (1802), and the device of using a mute to convey essential facts by dumbshow became a regular feature of melodramas. In his Dictionary of Literary Terms (first published in 1977), J. A. Cuddon lists 19th century plays with the titles The Dumb Boy (1821), The Dumb Brigand (1832), The Dumb Recruit (1840), The Dumb Driver (1849) and The Dumb Sailor (1854).

Cuddon notes three 20th-century instances of dumbshow: André Obey's Le Viol de Lucrece (1931), Samuel Beckett's Waiting for Godot (1953), and Tom Stoppard's Rosencrantz and Guildenstern Are Dead (1966).

== Sources ==
- Cuddon, J A (1998). A Dictionary of Literary Terms and Literary Theory (fourth ed.). Cambridge: Blackwell. ISBN 978-0-631-20271-4.
