= Shakespeare apocrypha =

Works questionably attributed to Shakespeare

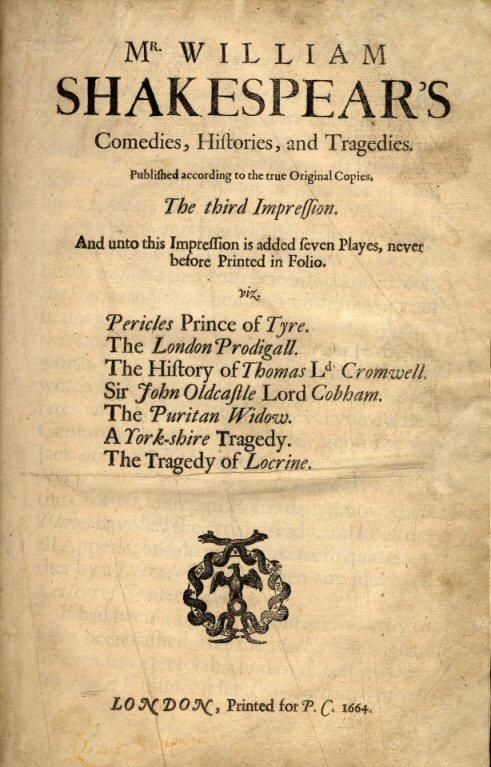
The Third Folio of Shakespeare's plays, listing additional works attributed to the author. Of the seven plays listed on this title page, only one (Pericles, Prince of Tyre) is generally considered to have been (partially) written by Shakespeare.

The Shakespeare apocrypha refers to a group of plays and poems that have sometimes been attributed to William Shakespeare, either individually or collaboratively, but whose authorship is disputed for various reasons. The issue is distinct from the Shakespearean authorship question, which concerns the authorship of the works traditionally attributed to Shakespeare.

== Background ==
During his lifetime, Shakespeare saw only about half of his plays in print. Some individual plays were published in quarto, a small, inexpensive format. In 1623, seven years after Shakespeare's death, his fellow actors John Heminges and Henry Condell compiled a folio collection of his complete plays, now known as the First Folio. Heminges and Condell were able to compile the collection because they, like Shakespeare, worked for the King's Men, the London playing company that produced Shakespeare's plays.

In addition to plays, poems were published under Shakespeare's name. The collection published as The Passionate Pilgrim contains poems by Shakespeare, poems known to have been written by other authors, and others of unknown authorship. Some scholars have attributed anonymous poems to Shakespeare.

The apocrypha can be categorized under the following headings:

== Plays attributed to Shakespeare during the 17th century, but not included in the First Folio ==
Several plays published in quarto during the seventeenth century bear Shakespeare's name on the title page or in other documents, but do not appear in the First Folio. Some of these plays (such as Pericles) are believed by most scholars of Shakespeare to have been written by him (at least in part). Others, such as Thomas Lord Cromwell, differ substantially in style from Shakespeare's accepted works.

Scholars have suggested various reasons for the existence of these plays. In some cases, printers may have falsely attributed plays to Shakespeare to capitalize on his reputation. In other cases, Shakespeare may have had an editorial role in the plays' creation, rather than actually writing them, or they may simply be based on a plot outline by Shakespeare. Some may be collaborations between Shakespeare and other dramatists (although the First Folio includes plays such as Henry VIII, Henry VI, Part 1 and Timon of Athens that are believed to be collaborative, according to modern stylistic analysis). Another possibility is that some of the plays were not written for the King's Men or dated from early in Shakespeare's career and were therefore unavailable to Heminges and Condell when they compiled the First Folio.

C. F. Tucker Brooke lists forty-two plays conceivably attributable to Shakespeare, many in his own lifetime, but dismisses the majority, leaving only most of those listed below, with some additions.

- The Birth of Merlin was published in 1662 as the work of Shakespeare and William Rowley. This attribution is considered erroneous because evidence dates the play to 1622, six years after Shakespeare's death. It is unlikely that Shakespeare and Rowley would have written together, as they were both chief dramatists for rival playing companies. The play has been called "funny, colourful, and fast-paced", but critical consensus follows Henry Tyrrell's conclusion that the play "does not contain in it one single trace of the genius of the bard of Avon", supplemented by C. F. Tucker Brooke's suggestion that Rowley was consciously imitating Shakespeare's style.
- Sir John Oldcastle was originally published anonymously in 1600 (STC 18796). In 1619, a second edition was attributed to Shakespeare as part of William Jaggard's False Folio. In fact, the diary of Philip Henslowe records that it was written by Anthony Munday, Michael Drayton, Richard Hathwaye, and Robert Wilson.
- A Yorkshire Tragedy was published in 1608 as the work of Shakespeare. Although a minority of readers support this claim, the weight of stylistic evidence supports Thomas Middleton.
- Pericles, Prince of Tyre was published under Shakespeare's name. Its uneven writing suggests that the first two acts are by another playwright. In 1868, Nicolaus Delius proposed George Wilkins as this unknown collaborator; a century later, F. D. Hoeneger proposed John Day. In general, critics have accepted that the last three-fifths are mostly Shakespeare's, following Gary Taylor's claim that by the middle of the Jacobean decade, "Shakespeare's poetic style had become so remarkably idiosyncratic that it stands out—even in a corrupt text—from that of his contemporaries."
- The Two Noble Kinsmen was published in quarto in 1634 as a collaboration between Shakespeare and John Fletcher, the young playwright who took over Shakespeare's job as chief playwright of the King's Men. Mainstream scholarship generally accepts this attribution, and the play is widely included in the Shakespeare canon despite its collaborative origins. It is included in its entirety in the Oxford Shakespeare (1986), and in the Riverside Shakespeare (1996).
- Edward III was published anonymously in 1596. It was first attributed to Shakespeare in a bookseller's catalogue published in 1656. Various scholars have suggested Shakespeare's possible authorship, since a number of passages appear to bear his stamp, among other sections that are remarkably uninspired. In 1996, Yale University Press became the first major publisher to produce an edition of the play under Shakespeare's name, and shortly afterward, the Royal Shakespeare Company performed the play (to mixed reviews). In 2001, the American professional premiere was staged by Pacific Repertory Theatre, which received positive reviews for the endeavour. A consensus is emerging that the play was written by a team of dramatists including Shakespeare early in his career—but exactly who wrote what is still open to debate. William Montgomery edited the play for the Second Edition of the Complete Oxford Shakespeare (2005), where it is attributed to "William Shakespeare and Others".
- The London Prodigal was printed in 1605 under Shakespeare's name. As it is a King's Men play, Shakespeare may have had a minor role in its creation, but according to Tucker Brooke, "Shakespeare's catholicity and psychological insight are conspicuously absent". Fleay hypothesized that Shakespeare wrote a rough outline or plot and left another playwright to the actual writing.
- The Second Maiden's Tragedy survives only in manuscript. Three crossed-out attributions in seventeenth-century hands attribute it to Thomas Goffe, Shakespeare, and George Chapman. Professional handwriting expert Charles Hamilton attempted to argue that the play was Shakespeare's manuscript of the lost Cardenio. However, stylistic analysis strongly indicates Thomas Middleton as the true author of The Second Maiden's Tragedy.
- The "Charles II Library" plays: in Charles II's library, an unknown seventeenth-century person had bound together three quartos of anonymous plays and labelled them "Shakespeare, vol. 1". The three plays are:
  - Fair Em, the Miller's Daughter of Manchester, written c. 1590. Another candidate for its authorship is Robert Wilson.
  - Mucedorus was first printed in 1598 and went through several editions despite the text's corrupt state. As it is a King's Men play, Shakespeare may have had a minor role in its creation or revision, but its authorship remains uncertain; Robert Greene is sometimes suggested.
  - The Merry Devil of Edmonton, first published in 1608. As it is a King's Men play, Shakespeare may have had a minor role in its creation, but the play's style bears no resemblance to Shakespeare.

== Plays attributed to "W. S." during the 17th century, and not included in the First Folio ==
Some plays were attributed to "W. S." in the seventeenth century. These initials could refer to Shakespeare, but could also refer to Wentworth Smith, an obscure dramatist.

- Locrine was published in 1595 as "Newly set forth, overseen and corrected by W. S."
- Thomas Lord Cromwell was published in 1602 and attributed to "W. S." Except for a few scholars, such as Ludwig Tieck and August Wilhelm Schlegel, "hardly anyone has thought that Shakespeare was even in the slightest way involved in the production of these plays."
- The Puritan was published in 1607 and attributed to "W. S." This play is now generally believed to be by Middleton or Smith.

== Plays attributed to Shakespeare after the 17th century ==
A number of anonymous plays have been attributed to Shakespeare by more recent readers and scholars. Many of these claims are supported only by debatable ideas about what constitutes "Shakespeare's style". Nonetheless, some of them have been cautiously accepted by mainstream scholarship.

- Arden of Faversham is an anonymous play printed in 1592 that has occasionally been claimed for Shakespeare. Its writing style and subject matter, however, are very different from those of Shakespeare's other plays. Full attribution is not supported by mainstream scholarship, though stylistic analysis has revealed that Shakespeare likely had a hand in at least scene VIII (the play is not divided into acts). Thomas Kyd is often considered to be the author of much of Faversham, but other writers have been proposed.
- Edmund Ironside is an anonymous manuscript play. Eric Sams attributed the play to Shakespeare and argued that it was his earliest extant work, but this view has convinced few, if any, Shakespeare scholars.
- Sir Thomas More survives only in manuscript. It is a play that was written in the 1590s and then revised, possibly as many as ten years later. The play is included in the Second Edition of the Complete Oxford Shakespeare (2005), which attributes the original play to Anthony Munday and Henry Chettle, with later revisions and additions by Thomas Dekker, Shakespeare, and Thomas Heywood. A few pages are written by an author ("Hand D") whom many believe to be Shakespeare, as the handwriting and spellings, as well as the style, seem a good match. The attribution is not accepted by everyone, however, especially since six signatures on legal documents are the only verified authentic examples of Shakespeare's handwriting.
- Thomas of Woodstock, sometimes also called Richard II, Part I, is an anonymous late-sixteenth or early-seventeenth century play depicting events leading up to the murder of Thomas of Woodstock immediately preceding those depicted in Shakespeare's Richard II. Thomas of Woodstock survives only as an anonymous and untitled manuscript lacking its final page (or pages), part of the Egerton Collection deposited in the British Library. Because the play describes the events immediately prior to those set forth in Richard II, some scholars have attributed the play to Shakespeare or suggested that it influenced Shakespeare's own play. Few of its editors, however, have supported the attribution to Shakespeare. Stylistic analysis led MacDonald P. Jackson to propose Samuel Rowley as a possible author in 2001. Later scholars, most notably Michael Egan, have tried to revive the attribution to Shakespeare.
- The Spanish Tragedy, by Thomas Kyd, is a play with elements reminiscent of Hamlet. Recent handwriting analysis suggests that portions may have been revised by Shakespeare. In 2013 the Royal Shakespeare Company published an edition attributing the play, in part, to William Shakespeare.
- A Knack to Know a Knave. Hanspeter Born has argued that Shakespeare rewrote some scenes in the romantic subplot of A Knack to Know a Knave, tentatively attributed by some scholars to Robert Greene.

== Lost plays ==
- Love's Labour's Won. A late sixteenth-century writer, Francis Meres, and a scrap of paper (apparently from a bookseller), both list this title among Shakespeare's then-recently published works, but no copy of a play with this title has survived. It may be a lost work or an alternative title for an existing play, such as Much Ado About Nothing, All's Well That Ends Well, or The Taming of the Shrew.
- The History of Cardenio. This late play by Shakespeare and Fletcher, referred to in several documents, has not survived. It was probably an adaptation of a tale in Miguel de Cervantes's Don Quixote. In 1727, Lewis Theobald produced a play he called Double Falshood [sic], which he claimed to have adapted from three manuscripts of a lost play by Shakespeare that he did not name. In contrast, handwriting expert Charles Hamilton claimed that The Second Maiden's Tragedy (generally considered the work of Thomas Middleton) is actually Shakespeare's manuscript of the lost play Cardenio. On the rare occasions when The Second Maiden's Tragedy has been revived on the stage, it is sometimes performed under the title Cardenio, as in the 2002 production directed by James Kerwin at the 2100 Square Foot Theater in Los Angeles, as well as a production at the Burton Taylor Theatre in 2004. In March 2010, the Arden Shakespeare imprint published an edition of Double Falsehood calling it a play by Shakespeare and Fletcher, adapted by Theobald, thus including it officially in Shakespeare's canon for the first time. In 2013, the Royal Shakespeare Company published an edition also attributing Double Falsehood, in part, to William Shakespeare.
- The lost play called the Ur-Hamlet is believed by a few scholars to be an early work by Shakespeare himself. The theory was first postulated by the academic Peter Alexander and is supported by Harold Bloom and Peter Ackroyd, although mainstream Shakespearean scholarship believes it to have been by Thomas Kyd. Bloom's hypothesis is that this early version of Hamlet was one of Shakespeare's first plays, that the theme of the Prince of Denmark was one to which he returned constantly throughout his career, and that he continued to revise it even after the canonical Hamlet of 1601.

== Hoaxes ==
The dream of discovering a new Shakespeare play has also resulted in the creation of at least one hoax. In 1796 William Henry Ireland claimed to have found a lost play of Shakespeare entitled Vortigern and Rowena. Ireland had previously released other documents he claimed were by Shakespeare, but Vortigern was the first play he attempted. (He later produced another pseudo-Shakespearean play, Henry II.) The play was initially accepted by the literary community—albeit not on sight—as genuine. The play was eventually presented at Drury Lane on 2 April 1796, to immediate ridicule, and Ireland eventually admitted to the hoax.

== Apocryphal poems ==
Several poems published anonymously have been attributed by scholars to Shakespeare. Others were attributed to him in 17th-century manuscripts. None have received universal acceptance. The authorship of some poems published under Shakespeare's name in his lifetime has also been questioned.

=== The Passionate Pilgrim ===
The Passionate Pilgrim is a collection of poems first published in 1599 by William Jaggard, later the publisher of Shakespeare's First Folio. Though the title page attributes the content to Shakespeare, many of the poems were written by others. Some are of unknown authorship and could be by Shakespeare. Jaggard issued an expanded edition of The Passionate Pilgrim in 1612, containing additional poems on the theme of Helen of Troy, announced on the title page ("Whereunto is newly added two Love Epistles, the first from Paris to Hellen, and Hellen's answere back again to Paris"). These were in fact by Thomas Heywood, from his Troia Britannica, which Jaggard had published in 1609. Heywood protested the unauthorized copying in his Apology for Actors (1612), writing that Shakespeare was "much offended" with Jaggard for making "so bold with his name." Jaggard withdrew the attribution to Shakespeare from unsold copies of the 1612 edition.

=== "A Lover's Complaint" ===
This poem was published as an appendix to Shakespeare's sonnets in 1609. Its authorship has been disputed by several scholars. In 2007, Brian Vickers, in his monograph, Shakespeare, "A Lover's Complaint", and John Davies of Hereford, attributed the "Complaint" to John Davies. Other scholars continue to attribute it to Shakespeare.

=== "To the Queen" ===
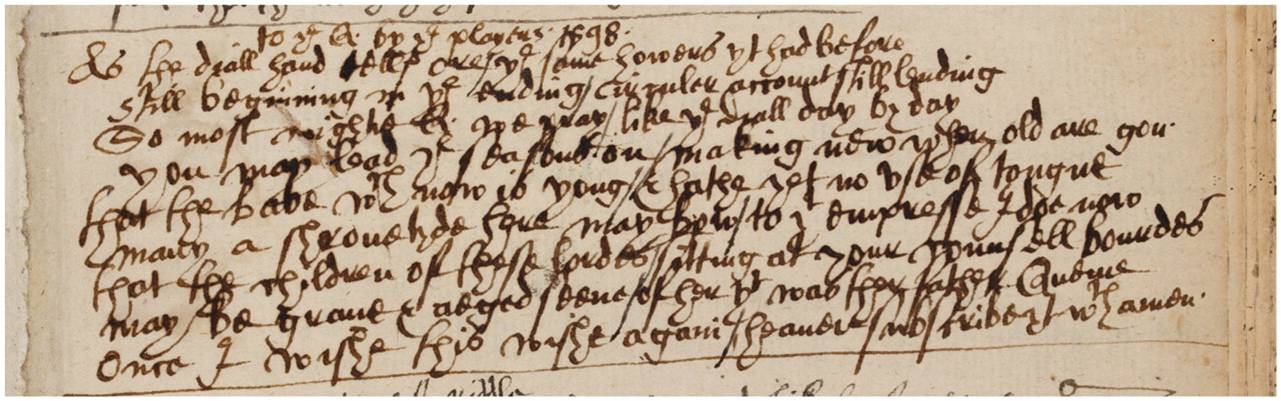
The manuscript of "To the Queen by the Players"

"To the Queen" is a short poem praising Queen Elizabeth, probably recited as an epilogue to a royal performance of a play. It was first attributed to Shakespeare by American scholars William Ringler and Steven May, who discovered the poem in 1972 in the notebook of Henry Stanford, who is known to have worked in the household of the Lord Chamberlain. The attribution was supported by James S. Shapiro and Juliet Dusinberre. Jonathan Bate included the poem in his 2007 complete Shakespeare edition for the Royal Shakespeare Company. The attribution has since been challenged by Michael Hattaway, who argued that the poem is more likely to be by Ben Jonson, and by Helen Hackett, who attributes it to Thomas Dekker.

=== A Funeral Elegy ===
In 1989, using a form of stylometric computer analysis, scholar and forensic linguist Donald Foster attributed A Funeral Elegy for Master William Peter, previously ascribed only to "W. S.", to William Shakespeare, based on an analysis of its grammatical patterns and idiosyncratic word usage. The attribution received extensive press attention from The New York Times and other newspapers.

Later analyses by scholars Gilles Monsarrat and Brian Vickers demonstrated Foster's attribution to be in error, and that the true author was probably John Ford. Foster conceded to Monsarrat in an e-mail message to the SHAKSPER e-mail list in 2002.

=== Shall I Die ===
This nine-verse love lyric was ascribed to Shakespeare in a manuscript collection of verses probably written in the late 1630s. In 1985, Gary Taylor drew attention to the attribution, leading to widespread scholarly discussion of it. The attribution is not widely accepted. Michael Dobson and Stanley Wells state that Shakespeare's authorship "cannot be regarded as certain".

=== Epitaphs ===
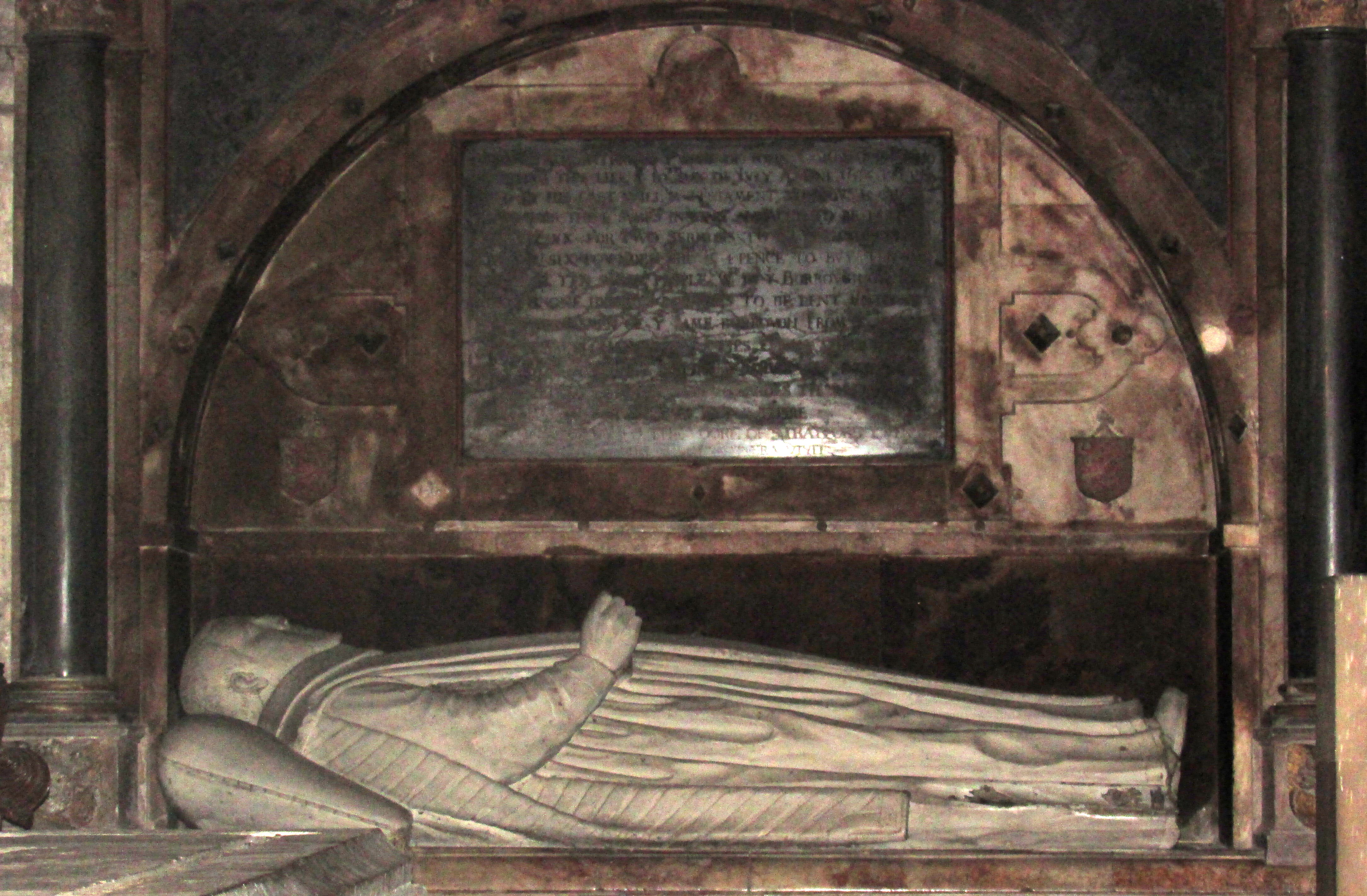
The tomb of John Combe in Holy Trinity church, Stratford-upon-Avon

Shakespeare has been identified as the author of two epitaphs to John Combe, a Stratford businessman, and one to Elias James, a brewer who lived in the Blackfriars area of London. Shakespeare certainly knew Combe and is likely to have known James. A joking epitaph is also supposed to have been created for Ben Jonson.

The epitaph for James was on a memorial in the church of St. Andrew-by-the-Wardrobe. The memorial no longer exists but was recorded in the 1633 edition of John Stow's Survey of London. The text is also present in the same manuscript which preserves Shall I Die, where it is ascribed to Shakespeare. The epitaph is a conventional statement of James' godly life.

The epitaphs for Combe are different. One is a satirical comment on Combe's money-lending at 10 per cent interest. The verse says that he lent money at one-in-ten, and it's ten-to-one he'll end up in hell. This is recorded in several variant forms in the 17th and 18th centuries, usually with the story that Shakespeare composed it extempore at a party with Combe present. Shakespeare is said to have written another, more flattering, epitaph after Combe died in 1614. It praises Combe for giving money in his will to the poor. The epitaph was reportedly to be affixed to Combe's tomb, which is close to Shakespeare's. However, there is no sign of it in the surviving tomb. The first epitaph, in variations, has also been attributed to other writers, addressed to other alleged usurers.

An anecdote recorded in the mid-17th century has Jonson beginning an epitaph to himself with the conventional "Here lies Ben Jonson ...", and Shakespeare completing it with the words "... who while he lived was a slow thing / And now being dead is no thing."

== A counter-orthodox Shakespeare canon and chronology ==
Building on the work of W. J. Courthope, Hardin Craig, E. B. Everitt, Seymour Pitcher and others, the scholar Eric Sams (1926–2004), who wrote two books on Shakespeare, edited two early plays, and published over a hundred papers, argued that "Shakespeare was an early starter who rewrote nobody's plays but his own", and that he "may have been a master of structure before he was a master of language". Shakespeare found accusations of plagiarism (e.g. Greene's "beautified with our feathers") offensive (Sonnets 30, 112).

Trusting the early 'biographical' sources John Aubrey and Nicholas Rowe, Sams re-assessed Shakespeare's early and 'missing' years, and argued through detailed textual analysis that Shakespeare began writing plays from the mid-1580s, in a style not now recognisably Shakespearean. The so-called 'Source Plays' and 'Derivative Plays' (The Famous Victories of Henry V, The Taming of a Shrew, The Troublesome Reign of King John, King Leir, etc.), and the so-called bad quartos, are (compositors' errors aside) his own first versions of famous later plays. As many of the Quarto title-pages proclaim, Shakespeare was an assiduous reviser of his own work, rewriting, enlarging and emending to the end of his life. He "struck the second heat / upon the Muses' anvil," as Ben Jonson put it in the Folio verse tribute.

Sams dissented from 20th-century orthodoxy, rejecting the theory of memorial reconstruction by forgetful actors as "wrong-headed". "Authorial revision of early plays is the only rational alternative." The few unofficial copies referred to in the preamble to the Folio were the 1619 quartos, mostly already superseded plays, for "Shakespeare was disposed to release his own popular early version[s] for acting and printing because his own masterly revision[s] would soon be forthcoming". Sams believed that Shakespeare in his retirement was revising his oeuvre "for definitive publication". The "apprentice plays" which had been reworked were naturally omitted from the Folio.

Sams also rejected 20th century orthodoxy on Shakespeare's collaboration, arguing that, with the exception of Sir Thomas More, Henry VIII, and Two Noble Kinsmen, the plays were solely his, though many were only partly revised. By Sams' authorship- and dating-arguments, Shakespeare wrote not only the earliest "modern" chronicle play, The Troublesome Reign, c. 1588, but also "the earliest known modern comedy and tragedy", A Shrew, c. 1588, and the Ur-Hamlet (c. 1587–88, substantially = the 1603 Quarto).

Sams also argued, more briefly, that "there is some evidence of Shakespearean authorship" of A Pleasant Commodie of Fair Em the Millers Daughter, with the loue of William the Conqueror, written before 1586, and of The Lamentable Tragedie of Locrine, written mid-1580s and "newly set foorth, ouerseene and corrected, by W.S." in 1595.

Eric Sams' revised Shakespeare canon and chronology (including apocryphal plays and bad quartos):
The Famous Victories of Henry V	Written by Shakespeare c. 1586 or earlier.	Released for printing c.1598 as Shakespeare nearing completion of Henry IV–Henry V trilogy (see below).
King Leir	Written by Shakespeare c. 1587.	Rewritten as the Quarto King Lear, the Folio text being further revised.
Pericles, Prince of Tyre	Written by Shakespeare late 1580s, as Jonson and Dryden reported.	Acts III–V rewritten for Quarto.
Edmund Ironside	Written by Shakespeare c. 1588 or earlier. Sams believes the manuscript is Shakespeare's hand.	Sequel Hardicanute lost; Ironside withdrawn because anti-clerical & completely rewritten as Titus Andronicus.
Ur-Hamlet	Written by Shakespeare c. 1588 or earlier; substantially = Hamlet Q1.	Rewritten and enlarged as Q2 Hamlet, the Folio text being further revised.
The Troublesome Reign of King John	Written by Shakespeare c. 1588.	Rewritten as King John.
The Taming of a Shrew	Written by Shakespeare c. 1588.	Rewritten as The Taming of the Shrew.
Titus Andronicus	Act I derives from an early version, written by Shakespeare c. 1589 (perhaps = the Titus and Vespasian, Henslowe's 'Tittus & Vespacia', performed in 1592); rest revised c. 1592.	Scene added for Folio text.
The True Tragedy of Richard III	Written by Shakespeare c. 1589–1590.	Rewritten as The Tragedy of King Richard III (see below).
Edward III	Written by Shakespeare c. 1589, revised 1593–1594.	Omitted from Folio because anti-Scottish.
The First Part of the Contention	Written by Shakespeare c. 1589–1590.	Rewritten as Henry VI, Part 2 for Folio.
Thomas of Woodstock, or The first Part of the Reign of King Richard II	Written by Shakespeare c. 1590.	Unpublished. Richard II the sequel.
The True Tragedie of Richard Duke of Yorke	Written by Shakespeare c. 1589–1590.	Rewritten as Henry VI, Part 3 for Folio.
Henry VI, Part 1	Written by Shakespeare c. 1590–1591.	
The Comedy of Errors	Written early 1590s. "A version played in 1594", but "no reason to suppose it was the Folio text".	
The Tragedy of King Richard III	First Quarto is Shakespeare's early version, written c. 1593.	Folio text revised and enlarged.
Sonnets	Autobiographical and mostly written c. 1590–94; earliest (no. 145) from early 1580s, latest (nos. 107, 126) written 1603 & 1605. Southampton the addressee; Venus and Adonis and A Lover's Complaint also written for and about him. Barnaby Barnes the rival poet. Sir William Harvey "Mr. W.H.", a suggestion that pre-dates Rowse.	Sams infers that "Shakespeare approved the printing of his Sonnets, their arrangement was in his own order and their manuscript in his own hand."
Love's Labour's Lost	A drame à clef, contemporaneous with the Sonnets.	Later revised and enlarged.
The Two Gentlemen of Verona	A drame à clef, contemporaneous with the Sonnets, written by Shakespeare post-1594. Sams follows A. L. Rowse's identifications (Proteus = Southampton, Valentine = Shakespeare, Silvia = Dark Lady of Sonnets).	
Richard II	Written c. 1595 or earlier.	Deposition scene added after 1598 (1608 Quarto), the Folio text being further revised.
A Midsummer Night's Dream	Sams follows A. L. Rowse's suggestion that this was played at the wedding in May 1594 of Mary Wriothesley, Countess of Southampton and Sir Thomas Heneage.	
Romeo and Juliet	First Quarto is Shakespeare's early version, written c. 1594–1595.	"Corrected, augmented and amended" in Second Quarto, with minor revisions thereafter.
The Merchant of Venice	Sams accepts the suggestion that this was written in 1596, after the capture at Cádiz of the San Andrés, to which it refers.	
[ Love's Labour's Won ]	Written soon after Love's Labour's Lost and rewritten as All's Well That Ends Well, a drame à clef (Bertram = Southampton, Parolles = Barnaby Barnes, Lafew = Shakespeare).	All's Well revised c. 1602.
The Merry Wives of Windsor	First Quarto is Shakespeare's early version, written late 1590s.	Substantially revised and enlarged for Folio.
Henry IV, Part 1 & Part 2	Written c. 1597–1598 (reworked from his Famous Victories of Henry V, c. 1586 – see above).	Apologetic altering of Sir John Oldcastle (buffoon in Famous Victories) to Sir John Falstaff.
Henry V	First Quarto is Shakespeare's 'middle' version, written 1590s (reworked from his Famous Victories of Henry V).	The Folio text revised and enlarged 1599.

Volume two was unfinished at the time of Sams' death.
