= Mucedorus =

Elizabethan era play

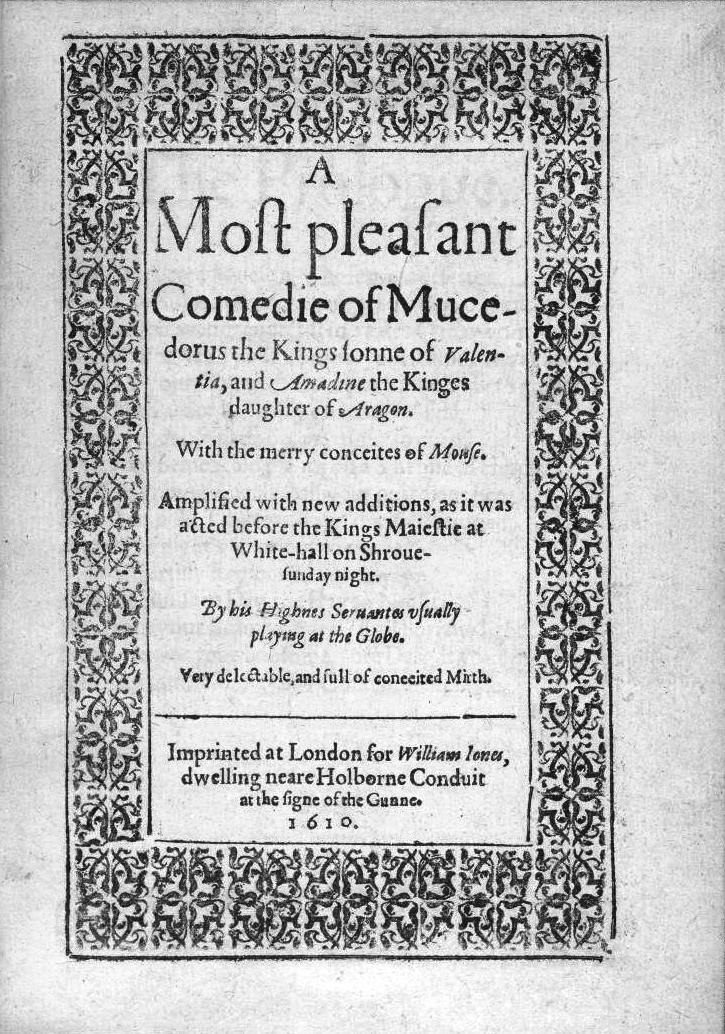
Title page of third quarto of Mucedorus (1610).

A Most pleasant Comedie of Mucedorus the Kings Sonne of Valentia, and Amadine the Kinges daughter of Aragon, commonly called Mucedorus, is an Elizabethan romantic comedy, first performed around 1590 and regularly revived until the Restoration. It was one of the most performed plays of its age, and 16 quarto editions were published between 1598 and 1668 making it the most widely printed play from the time. It was performed for both Queen Elizabeth and King James I. A revised and expanded version was published in 1610 with additional scenes.

Mucedorus has been attributed to William Shakespeare in whole and in part, but these theories are generally not accepted by Shakespeare scholars. It is generally classified as apocryphal and not part of the main Shakespearean canon. Other proposed authors have included George Peele, Robert Greene, and Thomas Lodge. Greene's James IV (c. 1590) and Peele's Old Wive's Tale (1595) belong to the same genre.

== Synopsis ==
A prologue was added to the play when it was performed for James I.

The play opens with an induction that consists of a meta-theatrical flyting between the allegorical personifications Comedy and Envy. Envy declares that he will turn this pleasant comedy into a tragedy. Comedy challenges Envy to do so and claims that mirth will triumph in the end.

The scenes usually labelled as act one, scenes one and two were new additions to the text with its Jacobean revision. In these scenes, the Prince of Valencia, Mucedorus, having heard that Amadine, the daughter of the king of Aragon, is extraordinarily beautiful, bids farewell to his friend Anselmo, revealing to him his plan to disguise himself in order to pursue her. Anselmo offers him the costume of a shepherd in which he has previously performed in a masque. Mucedorus disguises himself, swears Amselmo to secrecy, and departs. The second additional scene introduces the clown of the play, Mouse. He enters having fled from feeding his master's horse, frightened by a bear, or "some devil in a bear's doublet" (1.2.3). In his attempt to escape it, he advances backwards, only to trip over the bear and flee in terror.

The original version of the play began with Segasto, who is bethrothed to Amadine, running in terror, swiftly followed by Amadine herself, from a bear that chases them across the stage. Segasto abandons Amadine, but she is rescued by Mucedorus, who appears wielding a sword and the bear's head. She thanks him and invites him to the court of Aragon.

Upon Amadine and Mucedorus's arrival, Segasto becomes envious of Mucedorus, a lowly shepherd who is now honoured in court for his bravery. Segasto thus asks his friend, Tremelio, to kill Mucedorus, which Tremelio agrees to do, but Mucedorus dispatches him quickly. Mucedorus is brought before the King and sentenced to death for killing Tremelio, but Amadine reveals to the King that it was Mucedorus who saved her from the bear. The King spares Mucedorus's life, but Segasto falsifies a directive banishing Mucedorus from the kingdom. Amadine and Mucedorus declare their love for each other and decide to leave the kingdom together.

While waiting to meet up with Mucedorus later in the nearby woods, Amadine is captured by Bremo, a wild man, to be his bride. Mucedorus, finding that Amadine has disappeared, disguises himself again as a hermit and is captured by Bremo as well. Mucedorus convinces Bremo that he and Amadine must be taught how to fight so that they may defend themselves when Bremo is not around to protect them. Once Bremo gives Mucedorus a sword, Mucedorus kills him and sheds his disguise as the hermit and becomes the shepherd again. Segasto, who had been searching the forest for the lost couple, finds Amadine and Mucedorus. Amadine declares her love for Mucedorus, and Segasto decides to relent. Mucedorus now reveals that he is actually the Prince of Valencia.

Upon learning of these events, the King approves of the marriage between Mucedorus and Amadine, and the play ends with all the characters leaving to celebrate. The characters Envy and Comedy return to the stage, with Envy claiming that he can still defeat Comedy. As the two fight, they recognise the monarch in the audience (either Queen Elizabeth or King James) and declare that both comedy and tragedy serve the throne.

== Source and genre ==
Modern scholarship suggests a date for the play's origin c. 1590. Individual critics have considered The Arcadia of Sir Philip Sidney (one of whose characters is named Musidorus) as a source for the play, and have studied its relationship to pastoral and folktale forms, and to traditional mummers' plays, Medieval theatre and chivalric romances, and the Italian Commedia dell'arte.

Mucedorus is an early romantic comedy. It often elicits humour through rapid transitions between comedy and tragedy. For example, when Bremo is killed, there is only one line reflecting on his death before the play returns to the romantic plot. Most of the characters in Mucedorus are stock expectations for the genre, offering little depth or originality. Mouse's deafness is a play on the stock comedic fools who often wilfully twist a speaker's words.

== Printing history ==
Mucedorus was the most frequently reprinted play prior to the Restoration, with 17 quarto texts surviving before the end of the 17th century.

== Staging history ==
Mucedorus was performed by strolling players as late as the eighteenth century. One such performance, at Witney in Oxfordshire on 3 February 1653 (new style), saw a number of the audience killed and injured when the floor collapsed under the weight of the crowd. A Puritan preacher considered the accident a sign of God's displeasure with play-acting.

== Relationship to Shakespeare ==
Q3 (1610) of Mucedorus claims that it was in the repertoire of the Globe Theatre:

A/Most pleasant/Comedie of Muce-/dorus the Kings sonne of Valen-/tia, and Amadine the Kinges/daughter of Aragon./With the merry conceites of Mouse./Amplified with new additions, as it was/acted before the Kings Maistie at/White-hall on Shroue-/sunday night./By his Highnes Seruantes vsually/playing at the Globe./Very delectable, and full of conceited Mirth./Imprinted at London for William Iones./dwelling neare Holborne Conduit/at the signe of the Gunne./1610./

Starting with this same Q3 and continuing through all subsequent editions, the text of the play is augmented with six additional passages, which are plainly not the work of the original author. Some early critics considered Shakespeare as a potential author of these additions rather than the original play – though even this view is not regarded with favour by the modern scholarly consensus.

The play was assigned to Shakespeare in Edward Archer's play list of 1656, published in his edition of The Old Law; it was also bound together with Fair Em and The Merry Devil of Edmonton in a book labelled "Shakespeare. Vol. I" in the library of King Charles II.
