= Peter Fabell =

British magician

Peter Fabell or Fabel (fl. 15th century) was a reputed English magician who lived in Edmonton. A literary figure during the 16th and 17th century, he is considered by David Kathman to have been a historical figure, whatever the accretion of folklore to his name. He appears as the protagonist in the play The Merry Devil of Edmonton, printed 1608.

== In literature ==
He was known as a magician and dabbler in alchemy. In the prologue to the play it is proclaimed that the ‘merry devil,’ Peter Fabell, was ‘a renowned scholar.’

John Weever in his ‘Funerall Monuments’ (1631) says under ‘Edmundton:’

‘Here lieth interred under a seemelie tomb without inscription the body of Peter Fabell (as the report goes), upon whom this fable was fathered, that he by his wittie devices beguiled the devill: belike he was some ingenious conceited gentleman, who did use some slightie tricks for his own disports. He lived and died in the raigne of Henry VII, saith the booke of his merry pranks.’

John Norden, in an account of Edmonton, says:

‘There is a fable of one Peter Fabell, that lies in this church, who is said to have beguiled the devill by policie for money, but the devill is deceit itself.’

Thomas Brewer was author of a pamphlet dealing with the story of Fabell and others as treated in the play; this tract was entered in the Stationers' Registers in 1608, although not published till 1631. In Brewer's pamphlet we are told that Fabell was of good descent, and that he was ‘a man either for his gifts externall or internall inferior to few.’ It speaks of his learning, affability, and liberality to the poor and needy. Thomas Fuller says:

‘Some make him a fryer, others a lay gentleman, all a conceited person, who with his merry devices deceived the devil, who by grace may be resisted, not deceived by wit.’

== Notes ==
Attribution

This article incorporates text from a publication now in the public domain: Stephen, Leslie, ed. (1889). "Fabell, Peter". Dictionary of National Biography. Vol. 18. London: Smith, Elder & Co.
