= Giorgio Melchiori =

Italian literary critic and translator

Giorgio Melchiori CBE FBA (19 August 1920 – 8 February 2009) was an Italian literary critic and translator. His scholarly work was focused on the Early Modern English literature of the Elizabethan and Jacobean eras.

== Early life ==
Melchiori was born on 19 August 1920 in Rome, Italy.

== Career ==
Melchiori held the Chairs of English in the University of Turin and subsequently in Sapienza University of Rome, initially in the faculty of Literature and Philosophy, then later in the Faculty of Education, and at Roma Tre University.

=== In Britain ===
A student of Mario Praz who created a formidable group of scholars during the years of the Second World War, Melchiori was awarded one of the first post-war British Council Scholarships and arrived in England in 1944, where he was at once officially classified as an "Enemy Alien".

Despite an inauspicious start, his year at the University of Hull marked the beginning of a long and close connection with the country, where he spent part of each year lecturing, attending readings, and going to the theatre. The early friendship and support of Sir Herbert Read were instrumental in publishing the essays that became the core of his first book, The Tightrope Walkers: Essays on Mannerism in Contemporary English Literature. The book was immediately well received and helped him establish numerous connections within Anglo-Saxon literary criticism.

Another invaluable formative experience during this first post-war immersion in English culture was a six-week intensive course on editing organised by the British Council for a small group of international students held in Barford, near Stratford-upon-Avon in 1945, where Melchiori came into close personal contact with J. Dover Wilson, Clifford Leech, C. J. Sisson and a number of other greatly experienced editors of Elizabethan texts. This early training in philology laid the foundation for his editions many years later of The Merry Wives of Windsor (2000) and Edward III (1998) for Arden, of Henry IV part 2 (2000) for the New Cambridge, of John Marston's The Insatiate Countess (1984) for Manchester University Press and, together with Vittorio Gabrieli, of Anthony Munday's The Book of Sir Thomas More (1990) for Manchester University Press.

Melchiori likewise edited the nine-volume annotated edition of Shakespeare's plays (English texts with Italian translations) for the classic Meridiani edition published by Mondadori in Milan, a work completed in 1991. Besides many essays on Shakespeare and on the Elizabethans (a complete bibliography is to be found in the Italian entry under his name in Wikipedia) he published two books on Shakespeare, one a detailed examination of the only four Sonnets addressed neither to the young man nor to the dark lady: Shakespeare's Dramatic Meditations; an experiment in criticism (Oxford 1976), and Shakespeare's Garter Plays (Delaware, 1994).

Throughout his life, Melchiori was also deeply interested in Irish literature and was responsible for the definitive revision of the Italian translation of James Joyce's Ulysses Mondadori (1960). He founded and edited the annual review Joyce Studies in Italy in 1984, now edited by Franca Ruggieri, and published The Whole Mystery of Art: Pattern into Poetry in the Work of W. B. Yeats (Routledge, London, 1960), a study of the influence of the visual arts on the work of W. B. Yeats. His book Il gusto di Henry James (The Taste of Henry James), co-authored with Barbara Melchiori, was published in Italian by Einaudi in 1974.

Throughout his life, Melchiori was a tireless translator, especially in the early years after the war, in an effort to compensate for the period during which the Fascist regime had discouraged the teaching of the English language in Italy; he did much to make available Italian versions of English classics, both novels and poetry. He accepted the challenge when called upon to translate William Empson's Seven Types of Ambiguity, and the Italian version contains a page completely rewritten by Empson, who admitted that he could no longer explain what he had originally written. Especially outstanding were Melchiori's bilingual anthologies of the poems of John Donne and of the Metaphysical poets, still widely used by students today. Starting life with a wide knowledge of the visual arts (his first book, never translated, was a study in Italian of Michelangelo in English literature) his main pleasure was in theatre, cinema and opera, recordings of the latter during his last years of blindness were a constant refuge as two of his last publications Shakespeare all'opera: i drammi nella librettistica italiana (2006) and The Music of Words. From Madrigal to Drama and Beyond: Shakespeare Foreshadowing an Operatic Technique (2008) bears witness.
