= Induction (play) =

Explanatory scene in a play

An induction in a play is an explanatory scene, summary or other text that stands outside or apart from the main play with the intent to comment on it, moralize about it or in the case of dumb show—to summarize the plot or underscore what is afoot. Typically, an induction precedes the main text of a play. Inductions are a common feature of plays written and performed in the Renaissance period, including those of Shakespeare. While Shakespeare plays do not typically have inductions, they are sometimes depicted as part of the device of the play within the play. Examples include the dumb show in Hamlet and the address to the audience by Puck in A Midsummer Night's Dream. Another example, in The Spanish Tragedy by Thomas Kyd, is the introduction to that play by the ghost of Andrea who preps the audience by laying out the story to come. Likewise, Shakespeare's The Taming of the Shrew opens with induction scenes which involve characters watching the play proper.

== See also ==
- Play within a play
