= George Peele =

16th-century English translator, poet, and playwright

George Peele (baptised 25 July 1556 – buried 9 November 1596) was an English translator, poet, and dramatist, who is most noted for his supposed, but not universally accepted, collaboration with William Shakespeare on the play Titus Andronicus. Many anonymous Elizabethan plays have been attributed to him, but his reputation rests mainly on Edward I, The Old Wives' Tale, The Battle of Alcazar, The Arraignment of Paris, and David and Bethsabe. The Troublesome Reign of John, King of England, the immediate source for Shakespeare's King John, has been published under his name.

== Life ==
Peele was christened on 25 July 1556 at St James Garlickhythe in the City of London. His father, James Peele (died 30 December 1585), who appears to have belonged to a Devonshire family, was clerk of Christ's Hospital, a school which was then situated in central London. He wrote two treatises on bookkeeping, The Maner and Fourme How to Kepe a Perfecte Reconyng (1553) and The Pathe Waye to Perfectnes (1569). The latter depicts James Peele in a woodcut on the title page. No contemporary likeness of George is known, although he was said to be short-legged, dark complected, red haired, and squinting, although not necessarily from reliable sources. George's mother, Anne, died on 1 July 1580, and his father married Christian Widers (d. 1597 in St Christopher le Stocks, a church since demolished) on 3 November 1580. She became a nurse on the Hospital payroll, where she remained five years after James Peele's death, when she married Ralph Boswell. His siblings included Anne (died 10 January 1568/9), Isabel, Judith (died 16 April 1582) and James (born 3 January 1563/4). Anne married John Alford on 14 May 1565 and had one son, Robert (9 October 1567 – c. 12 March 1654/5). Judith married John Jackman on 19 June 1575 and had three children, Susan (born 3 June 1576), William (30 April 1577 – 1 July 1577) and Sarah (died 25 May 1578). On 5 February 1568/9 Isabel married Mathew Shakespeare, with whom she had eight children. Duncan Salkeld, a university lecturer at University of Chichester, has suggested that while Matthew Shakespeare "may have been unrelated" to William Shakespeare, the listing of Matthew's marriage to Isabel Peele suggests a possible link, because Isabels' playwriting brother is thought by some to have collaborated on Shakespeare's Titus Andronicus. James Peele also wrote the Ironmongers' Pageants of 1566 and 1569, which may have led to George's writing of two Lord Mayor's pageants.

George Peele was educated at Christ's Hospital, and entered Broadgates Hall, Oxford, in 1571. In 1574 he removed to Christ Church, taking his B.A. degree in 1577, and proceeding M.A. in 1579. In that year, the governors of Christ's Hospital requested their clerk to "discharge his house of his son, George Peele." He went up to London about 1580, the year he married his first wife, 16-year-old heiress Ann Cooke, the only child of Hugh Christian, who was also known by the surnames Cooke, Alettor, Elector, and Nelettor (his brother, Daniel, used Alettor). Christian had died a few months before the marriage, and lawsuits over his estate were not settled for years, draining the inheritance.

In 1583, when Albertus Alasco (Albert Laski), a Polish nobleman, was entertained at Christ Church, Peele was entrusted with the arrangement of two Latin plays by William Gager (fl. 1580–1619) presented on the occasion. He was also complimented by Gager for an English verse translation of one of the Iphigenias of Euripides. In 1585 he was employed to write the Device of the Pageant borne before Woolston Dixie, and in 1591 he devised the pageant in honour of another Lord Mayor, Sir William Webbe. This was the Descensus Astraeae (printed in the Harleian Miscellany, 1808), in which Queen Elizabeth is honoured as Astraea.

Robert Greene, at the end of his pamphlet Greene's Groats-Worth of Wit, exhorts Peele to repentance, saying that Peele, like Greene himself, has "been driven to extreme shifts for a living." Anecdotes of his reckless life were emphasized by the use of his name in connection with the apocryphal Merrie conceited Jests of George Peele (printed in 1607). Many of the stories had circulated before in other jestbooks, unattached to Peele's name, but there are personal touches that may be biographical. The book provided source material for the play The Puritan, one of the works of the Shakespeare Apocrypha. This is largely dismissed by Peele biographer David H. Horne. "In the minds of at least some of those who have voiced such views a process of circular reasoning must have unconsciously taken place: Meres' statement that Peele died by the pox means that Peele was dissipated, since the hero of the Jests is dissipated. His acquaintanceship with Greene, who was dissipated, bears this out. therefore, because he was acquainted with Greene and died of the pox, the evidence of the Jests to the effect that he was dissipated may be accepted as authentic." He notes that jest books on famous subjects were common, including William Shakespeare, Ben Jonson, Colley Cibber, Thomas Killigrew, James Quin, David Garrick, Laurence Sterne, William Congreve, Lord Sandwich, Lord Chesterfield, Samuel Johnson, Falstaff, Tristram Shandy, and Polly Peachum. He shows that most were derived from Merry Tales and Quick Answers, while the few jests unique to the volume follow similar patterns to traditional jests with merely the details changed. "Peele was a product of the middle London," Horne writes, "but his recurrent courtly themes of war and pastoralism show that in his work he aspired to the highest. It is ironical that his present reputation should have dropped him to the lowest ... But why is it that although Ben Jonson killed a man and was in prison many times, his reputation does not seem to have suffered? Let us not single out Peele for opprobrium unless we are prepared to maintain that all of Greene's acquaintances, and men like Jonson, were immersed in sin." Horne then attacks W.M. Creizenach's view that David and Bethsabe is the "product of a crapulous morality dating from the last years of the poet's dissolute life" as having a questionable basis – "Peele was in most respects like his fellow Elizabethans, morally neither better or worse, aesthetically more perceptive; in technical skill equal to his fellow poets; in the sweetness of his piping superior to all but Marlowe, Spenser, and Shakespeare."

Peele may have married a second time, to Mary Gates or Yates. It is not possible to state definitively that the George Peele who married Mary Gates is the dramatist, as another George Peele, a boxmaker who died in 1604, was living in London at the time. There is not enough information in the record to determine for certain to which George Peele she was actually married. Frank S. Hook, who edited a 1961 edition of Edward I, suggests that David H. Horne's speculation in the first volume of the same edition is correct in believing this is the same George Peele based on a fictitious incident in the play's first scene:

Peele may be more interested in what should be done than in what actually has been done. The emphasis on generosity to soldiers and veterans is in ironic contrast to the way the fighting forces in the Netherlands were actually treated. Leicester's reports, summarized in the Calendar of State Papers (Foreign) show amply the suffering of soldiers; they were not paid on time, and their living conditions were deplorable. Likewise, the Acts of Privy Council for the period after 1590, when soldiers began returning from Willoughby's expedition to France, demonstrate the care of wounded veterans was becoming an increasingly embarrassing problem for Elizabeth's government. Read in light of these contemporary documents, this scene takes on a bitterly ironic note.

In the scene, Edward I establishes a "colledge" for wounded soldiers, something he did not do in real life, nor was this something Elizabeth did, although in 1587, the Earl of Leicester had done so in Elizabeth's name, at the Galthius. While it must be said that Hook and Horne are writing for the same edition with Charles Tyler Prouty as general editor, this ties directly with Horne's supposition that this is the same George Peele, for the George Peele who married Mary Gates, who was the widow of the former Master-Gunner of Berghen-op-Zoom, Lawrence Gates, and Mary and George Peele entered a lengthy legal battle to collect Mary's war widow salary. One wonders why Peele would have added such a fictitious moment to Edward I were he not the George Peele trying to collect these funds. This involved a three-year litigation against Thomas Gurlyn, who was a buyer of soldiers' uncollected wages, who countersued Mary on allegations that she had forged Lawrence Gates's will. The record does not show whether Gurlyn, who stalled payment, ever actually paid what he owed to the Peeles, despite Peele obtaining a verdict against him. Horne speculates that evidence of Peele's sickness in a letter to Lord Burghley indicates that he was probably unable to work and thus pay legal fees. Horne also speculates that Peele himself may have been a soldier.

== Death ==
Peele died "of the pox," according to Francis Meres, aged 40, and was buried on 9 November 1596 in St James's Church, Clerkenwell. One of the eight boarding houses at the modern Horsham campus of Christ's Hospital is now named Peele after George Peele, and as a commemoration to the work of the Peele family with the ancient foundation of the Christ's Hospital school.

== Plays ==
- Sir Clyomon and Sir Clamydes (1577) (attributed)
- The Arraignment of Paris (1581)
- The Troublesome Reign of King John (1589)
- Mucedorus (1590) (attributed)
- The Battle of Alcazar (1591)
- Titus Andronicus (1592) (attributed; co-written with Shakespeare)
- The Famous Chronicle of King Edward the First (1593)
- The Love of King David and Fair Bethsabe (1599)
- The Old Wives' Tale (1595)

His pastoral comedy The Arraignment of Paris was presented by the Children of the Chapel Royal before Queen Elizabeth perhaps as early as 1581, and was printed anonymously in 1584. In the play, Paris is asked by Jupiter to decide which goddesses, Juno, Pallas or Venus should be awarded the golden apple. He awards this to Venus who carries Paris away, leaving his wife Oenone disconsolate. Juno and Pallas arraign Paris before the gods of partiality in his judgement. The case is then referred to Diana, with whom the final decision rests. She gives the apple to none of the competitors but to a nymph called Eliza, 'our Zabeta fayre', a reference to Queen Elizabeth I.

His play Famous Chronicle of King Edward the First was printed in 1593. This chronicle history is an advance on the old chronicle plays, and marks a step towards the Shakespearean historical drama. Peele may have written or contributed to the bloody tragedy Titus Andronicus, which was published as the work of Shakespeare. This theory is in part due to Peele's predilection for gore, as evidenced in The Battle of Alcazar (acted 1588–1589, printed 1594), published anonymously, which is attributed with much probability to him. The Old Wives' Tale (printed 1595) was followed by The Love of King David and fair Bethsabe (written ca. 1588, printed 1599), which is notable as an example of Elizabethan drama drawn entirely from Scriptural sources. F. G. Fleay sees in it a political satire, and identifies Elizabeth and Leicester as David and Bathsheba, Mary, Queen of Scots as Absalom.

Sir Clyomon and Sir Clamydes (printed 1599) has been attributed to Peele, but on insufficient grounds. Other plays attributed to Peele include Jack Straw (ca. 1587), The Wisdom of Doctor Dodypoll (printed 1600), The Maid's Metamorphosis (printed 1600), and Wily Beguiled (printed 1606) – though the scholarly consensus has judged these attributions to be insufficiently supported by evidence. Indeed, individual scholars have repeatedly resorted to Peele in their attempts to grapple with Elizabethan plays of uncertain authorship. Plays that have been assigned to (or blamed on) Peele include Locrine, The Troublesome Reign of King John, and Parts 1 and 2 of Shakespeare's Henry VI trilogy, in addition to Titus Andronicus. Edward III was attributed to Peele by Tucker Brooke in 1908. Sir Brian Vickers used metrical and other analysis to argue that Peele wrote the first act and the first two scenes of Act II of Titus Andronicus, with Shakespeare responsible for the rest of the play.

== Minor works ==
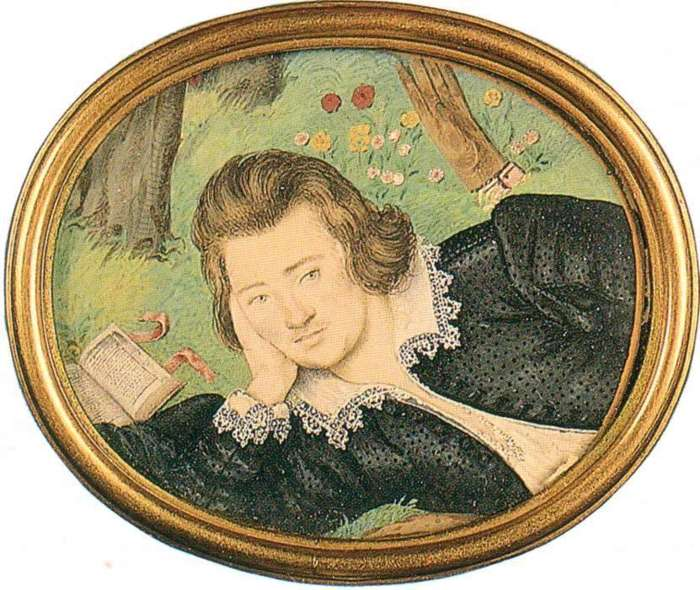
Peele wrote a poem The Honour of the Garter, dedicated to Henry Percy and for the occasion of his admission to the Order of the Garter, on 26 June 1593.

Among his occasional poems are The Honour of the Garter, which has a prologue containing Peele's judgments on his contemporaries, and Polyhymnia (1590), a blank verse description of the ceremonies attending the retirement of the queen's champion, Sir Henry Lee. This is concluded by the lyric poem, A Farewell to Arms. This was written for the retirement ceremony in 1590 of Queen Elizabeth I's champion knight in which he pledges undying loyalty to the queen, addressed as "Goddess". It was quoted by Thackeray in the seventy-sixth chapter of The Newcomes and notably served as the title of Ernest Hemingway's novel of the same name. To The Phoenix Nest in 1593 he contributed The Praise of Chastity.

== Reputation ==
Peele belonged to the group of university scholars who, in Greene's phrase, "spent their wits in making playes." Greene went on to say that he was "in some things rarer, in nothing inferior," to Christopher Marlowe and Thomas Nashe. This praise was not unfounded. The credit given to Greene and Marlowe for the increased dignity of English dramatic diction, and for the new smoothness infused into blank verse, must certainly be shared by Peele. The most familiar parts of Peele's work are, however, the songs in his plays – from The Old Wives' Tale and The Arraignment of Paris, and the song "A Farewell to Arms" – which are regularly anthologized.

My golden locks Time hath to silver turnd.
O Time too swift, O swiftness never ceasing!
My youth 'gainst time and age hath ever spurnd,
But spurnd in vain. Youth waneith by increasing.
Beauty, strength, youth, are flowers but fading seen,
Duty, faith, love, are roots, and ever green.

My Helmet now shall make a hive for bees
And lovers' sonnets turne to holy Psalms.
A man at Armes must now serve on his knees,
And feed on pray'rs, that are Age his alms.
But though from Court to Cottage I depart,
My Saint is sure of mine unspotted heart.

And when I saddest sits in homely cell,
I'll teach my Swaines this Carrol for a song.
Blest be the hearts that wish my Sovereigne well,
Curs'd be the souls that thinke her any wrong.
Goddess, vouchsafe this aged man his right
To be your Beadsman now that was your knight.

— George Peele, "A Farewell to armes", Polhymnia, 17 November 1590.

Professor Francis Barton Gummere, in a critical essay prefixed to his edition of The Old Wives Tale, puts in another claim for Peele. In the contrast between the romantic story and the realistic dialogue he sees the first instance of humour quite foreign to the comic business of earlier comedy. The Old Wives Tale is a play within a play, slight enough to be perhaps better described as an interlude. Its background of rustic folklore gives it additional interest, and there is much fun poked at Gabriel Harvey and Richard Stanyhurst. Perhaps Huanebango, who parodies Harvey's hexameters, and actually quotes him on one occasion, may be regarded as representing that arch-enemy of Greene and his friends.

Peele's Works were edited by Alexander Dyce (1828, 1829–1839 and 1861), A. H. Bullen (2 vols., 1888), and by Charles Tyler Prouty (3 vols., 1952–1970). An examination of the metrical peculiarities of his work is to be found in Richard Lämmerhirt's Georg Peele, Untersuchungen über sein Leben und seine Werke (Rostock, 1882). See also Professor F.B. Gummere, in Representative English Comedies (1903); and an edition of The Battell of Alcazar, printed for the Malone Society in 1907.

== Bibliography ==
- This article incorporates text from a publication now in the public domain: Chisholm, Hugh, ed. (1911). "Peele, George". Encyclopædia Britannica. Vol. 21 (11th ed.). Cambridge University Press. pp. 44–45.
- This article incorporates text from a publication now in the public domain: "Peele, George". Dictionary of National Biography. London: Smith, Elder & Co. 1885–1900.
- "George Peele: Poetry Foundation".
- Logan, Terence P.; Denzell S. Smith (1973). The Predecessors of Shakespeare: A Survey and Bibliography of Recent Studies in English Renaissance Drama. University of Nebraska Press, Lincoln, NE.
- Loughlin, Marie; Bell, Sandra; Brace, Patricia, eds. (2011). The Broadview Anthology of Sixteenth-Century Poetry and Prose. Broadview anthologies of English literature. Broadview Press. ISBN 9781551111629.
