= The Merry Devil of Edmonton =

Elizabethan-era stage play

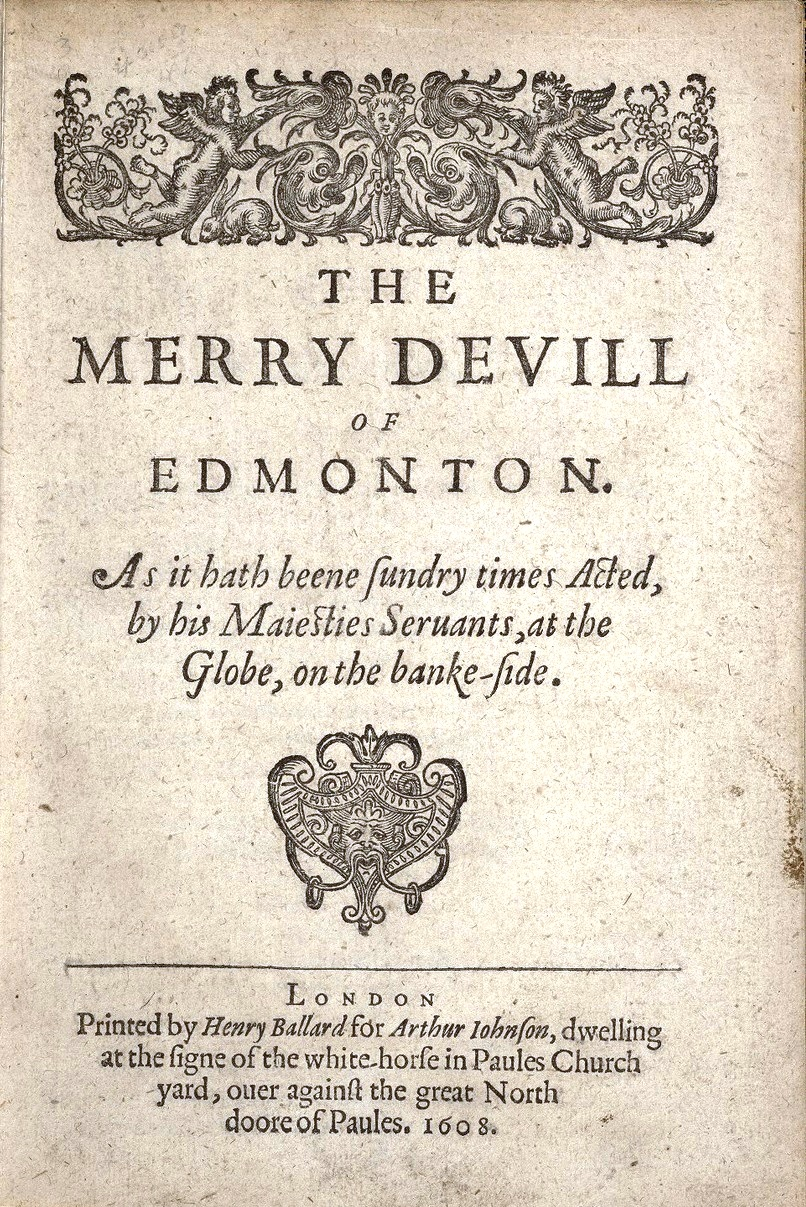
- Title page of the 1608 edition of The Merry Devil of Edmonton
- Original language: English
- Genre: Comedy

Premiere
- Date: 1600–1604

The Merry Devil of Edmonton is an Elizabethan-era stage play; a comedy about a magician, Peter Fabell, nicknamed the Merry Devil. It was at one point attributed to William Shakespeare, but is now considered part of the Shakespeare Apocrypha.

== Date and text ==
Scholars have conjectured dates of authorship for the play as early as 1592, though most favor a date in the 1600–4 period. The Merry Devil enters the historical record in 1604, when it is mentioned in a contemporary work called the Black Booke. The play was entered into the Stationers' Register on 22 October 1607, and published the next year, in a quarto printed by Henry Ballard for the bookseller Arthur Johnson (Q1 – 1608). Five more quartos appeared through the remainder of the century: Q2 – 1612; Q3 – 1617; Q4 – 1626; Q5 – 1631; and Q6 – 1655. All of these quartos were anonymous.

== Shakespearean authorship ==
Publisher Humphrey Moseley obtained the rights to the play and re-registered it on 9 September 1653 as a work by William Shakespeare. Moseley's attribution to Shakespeare was repeated by Edward Archer in his 1656 play list [see: The Old Law], and by Francis Kirkman in his list of 1661. The play was bound with Fair Em and Mucedorus in a book titled "Shakespeare. Vol. I" in the library of Charles II.

As its publishing history indicates, the play was popular with audiences; it is mentioned by Ben Jonson in the Prologue to his play The Devil is an Ass. While Merry Devil was a King's Men play and Shakespeare may have had a minor role in its creation, it does not have the distinctive marks of Shakespeare's style. Individual 19th-century critics attempted to attribute the play to Michael Drayton or to Thomas Heywood; but their attributions have not been judged credible by other scholars. William Amos Abrams proposed Thomas Dekker as the play's author in his 1942 edition; Dekker scholars Gerald J. Eberle and M. T. Jones-Davies agreed, though Fredson Bowers, the editor of Dekker's Dramatic Works, was unpersuaded by the evidence offered and did not include it in his edition.

== Synopsis ==
Sir Arthur Clare wants to break off his daughter Milliscent's arranged marriage. He plans to temporarily send her to a nunnery, but she resists as she doesn't want to leave her family or potential love for another potential suitor, Frank Jerningham. Raymond, the heir of Sir Richard Mounchensey, is in love with Milliscent and Clare agrees to let him pursue her, but Milliscent must wait a year to marry. Raymond disguises himself as a friar and plots with his friends to court and potentially kidnap Milliscent. They enlist the help of Fabell, who agrees to use magic to help them. In a separate storyline, a group of thieves plans to serve the Duke of Norfolk while hiding from keepers. The two storylines converge and end with Milliscent confessing to marrying Raymond.

== Performance history ==
The play was performed at Court on 8 May 1608; it was also one of the twenty plays that the King's Men acted at Court in the Christmas season of 1612–13 during the festivities celebrating the wedding of Princess Elizabeth, the daughter of King James I, with Frederick V, Elector Palatine. Professional productions in the modern age have been rare, though a radio adaptation was produced by the BBC in 1957, an original practice performance by Bad Quarto Productions at the 2010 Philadelphia Fringe Festival, and an off-Broadway reading at the Red Bull Theater in 2017. In January 2020, The Merry Devil of Edmonton was performed for the first time in Edmonton, Canada as a part of Edmonton's Winter Shakespeare Festival. The performance was a staged reading of a text adapted by John Richardson to include references to the history and contemporary landmarks of the Canadian Edmonton.

== Sources ==
- Chambers, E. K. The Elizabethan Stage. 4 Volumes, Oxford, Clarendon Press, 1923.
- Kozlenko, William, ed. Disputed Plays of William Shakespeare. Hawthorn Books, 1974.
- Logan, Terence P., and Denzell S. Smith, eds. The Popular School: A Survey and Bibliography of Recent Studies in English Renaissance Drama. Lincoln, NE, University of Nebraska Press, 1975.
- Tucker Brooke, C. F., ed. The Shakespeare Apocrypha. Oxford, the Clarendon Press, 1908.
