= Sir Clyomon and Sir Clamydes =

Sir Clymon and Sir Clamydes (full title: The History of the Two Valiant Knights, Sir Clyomon Knight of the Golden Shield, Son to the King of Denmark, and Clamydes the White Knight, Son to the King of Swabia) is an early Elizabethan stage play, first published in 1599 but written perhaps three decades earlier (c. 1570). It is often regarded as a characteristic example—perhaps the best surviving example—of the type of drama that was extremely popular in the early Elizabethan period. The work "best represents the characteristics of pre-Greenian dramatic romance."

== Publication ==
Sir Clyomon and Sir Clamydes was first printed in 1599, in a quarto issued by stationer Thomas Creede. The title page makes no attribution of authorship; it does state that the play was "sundry time" performed by Queen Elizabeth's Men. That playing company originated in 1583; if the play is as old as some commentators judge it, the company's version must have been a revival.

== Genre ==
The play has been called a "comedy, or, more properly, tragicomedy", though it falls securely into the category of romance, an enormously popular genre in the Middle Ages and the Renaissance.

Clyomon and Clamydes is an extravagant example of stage romance. In his Defense of Poetry, Sir Philip Sidney generally defended the poets and poems of his era from their critics; but in a famous and often-quoted passage he also ridiculed the fanciful and wild romances then common on the popular stage, in which:

...you shall have Asia of the one side, and Affrick of the other, and so many other under-kingdoms, that the player, when he commeth in, must ever begin with telling where he is, or else the tale will not be conceived. Now you shall have three ladies walk to gather flowers, and then we must believe the stage to be a garden. By and by, we hear news of shipwreck in the same place, and then we are to blame if we accept it not for a rock. Upon the back of that comes out a hideous monster, with fire and smoke, and then the miserable beholders are bound to take it for a cave. While in the meantime two armies fly in, represented with four swords and bucklers, and then what hard heart will not receive it for a pitched field?"

A quick summary of the physical locations in this play confirms and even accentuates Sidney's description: the drama opens in Denmark, "and passes successively to Swabia, to the Forest of Marvels on the borders of Macedonia, to the Isle of Strange Marshes twenty days' sail from Macedonia, to the Forest again, to the Isle again, to Norway, to the Forest, to the Isle, to the Forest, to a road near Denmark, to the Isle, to Denmark."

== Verse ==
The play is composed in the rhymed fourteener or heptameter verse that was popular in its era. When the heroine Neronis (daughter of Patranius, late King of the Isle of Strange Marshes) enters the Forest of Marvels in male disguise, she speaks this:

As hare the hound, as lamb the wolf, as fowl the falcon's dint,

So do I fly from tyrant he, whose heart more hard than flint
Hath sack'd on me such hugy heaps of ceaseless sorrows here,

That sure it is intolerable, the torments that I bear.

The meter has a jog-trot rhythm to a modern ear, but poets like Sidney and Arthur Golding employed it for works of serious intent.

== Authorship and Origin ==
There is no evidence from the Elizabethan era to indicate the author of Sir Clymon and Sir Clamydes. Scholars and critics have proposed George Peele, Thomas Preston, Robert Wilson, and one Richard Bower. No convincing case has been made for any single candidate.

The source for the basic story is the Roman de Perceforest, an extensive prose romance that has come down to us in four manuscripts dated to the fifteenth century. As medievalist Sylvia Huot sums it up and documents, "Perceforest is the undisputed source for the Elizabethan play Clyomon and Clamydes, composed about 1576–77 and printed in 1599."

== Influence ==
Clyomon and Clamydes is thought to have had an influence on several of Shakespeare's plays. Most notably, Rosalind in As You Like It disguises herself in male clothing and flees courtly life for residence among simple shepherds—just as Neronis does in her play. In A Midsummer Night's Dream, the playlet of the mechanicals in Act V bears a resemblance with Clyomon and Clamydes, though in this case the resemblance is clearly in a spirit of parody. And the late romance Cymbeline bears a significant relationship with Clyomon and Clamydes. Shakespeare uses a personified figure of Rumour as a Chorus at the start of Henry IV, Part 2; the same figure appears in Clyomon and Clamydes.

== Synopsis ==
Clamydes, son of the King of Swabia, has a problem: he cannot marry his beloved, Juliana, until he slays a dragon that has been killing and eating maidens and matrons. Clamydes must bring Juliana the severed head of the "flying serpent." Juliana's brother Clyomon, son of the King of Denmark, takes Clamydes' place when the Suavian king is knighting his son—effectively stealing his brother-in-law-to-be's knighthood.

(Clyomon is originally accompanied by a clown character called Subtle Shift, or Knowledge—a version of the Vice character in the medieval morality play. Shift quickly shifts sides to Clamydes when it's in his interest; though he later betrays Clamydes as well. The play's personification of Rumour is another holdover from its medieval antecedents.)

Sir Clyomon sets off on his knightly adventures, which lead him to the Macedonia of Alexander the Great (a figure commonly featured in chivalric romance). Clamydes pursues Clyomon, seeking revenge for his stolen knighthood; meanwhile he kills the dragon in an offstage fight. But he falls victim to the spells of the evil magician Bryan Sans Foy, who steals Clamydes' arms and apparel (and his dragon's head). Bryan intends to take Clamydes' place and marry Juliana.

Clyomon is driven by storms to the Isle of Strange Marshes; he falls in love with the princess Neronis. He vows his fealty to her—and returns to his adventures. (He has sworn to meet and fight with Clamydes, so his knightly honor compels him.) Thrasellus, the King of Norway, also loves Neronis; she has rejected him, and so he kidnaps her. She, however, escapes for him, and in male disguise seeks refuge with the shepherd Corin. (Neronis is "the earliest known example of a girl disguised as a page" in English Renaissance drama, making her the ancestress of Lyly's Gallathea and Phillida, Shakespeare's Rosalind and Viola, and all their successors.) Clyomon tries to rescue Neronis; he meets, fights, and kills Thrasellus. Yet since the man is a king, Clyomon gives him an honorable burial, decorating the hearse with his own shield. Neronis finds hearse and shield, and mistakes the dead man for Clyomon. In grief, she sings a song and tries to kill herself with Clyomon's sword—when Providence descends from the heavens to stop her. He assures her that she will find her living beloved soon. Neronis, still in boy's clothes, takes service as page with a disguised Clyomon.

(Thrasellus's hearse remains onstage from one Forest scene to the next—even though an Isle scene intercedes between them.)

After their abundant adventures, problems are resolved in the end. The two knights become friends when Clamydes realizes that Clyomon is a prince of Denmark and Juliana's brother; they return north. Neronis realizes that she is working for the man she loves. Clamydes chases away the cowardly Bryan Sans Foy. Neronis reveals her true identity. The couples plan their weddings as the play concludes.

== Links ==
Scanned text from Early English Books Online
