= David and Bethsabe =

Play by George Peele

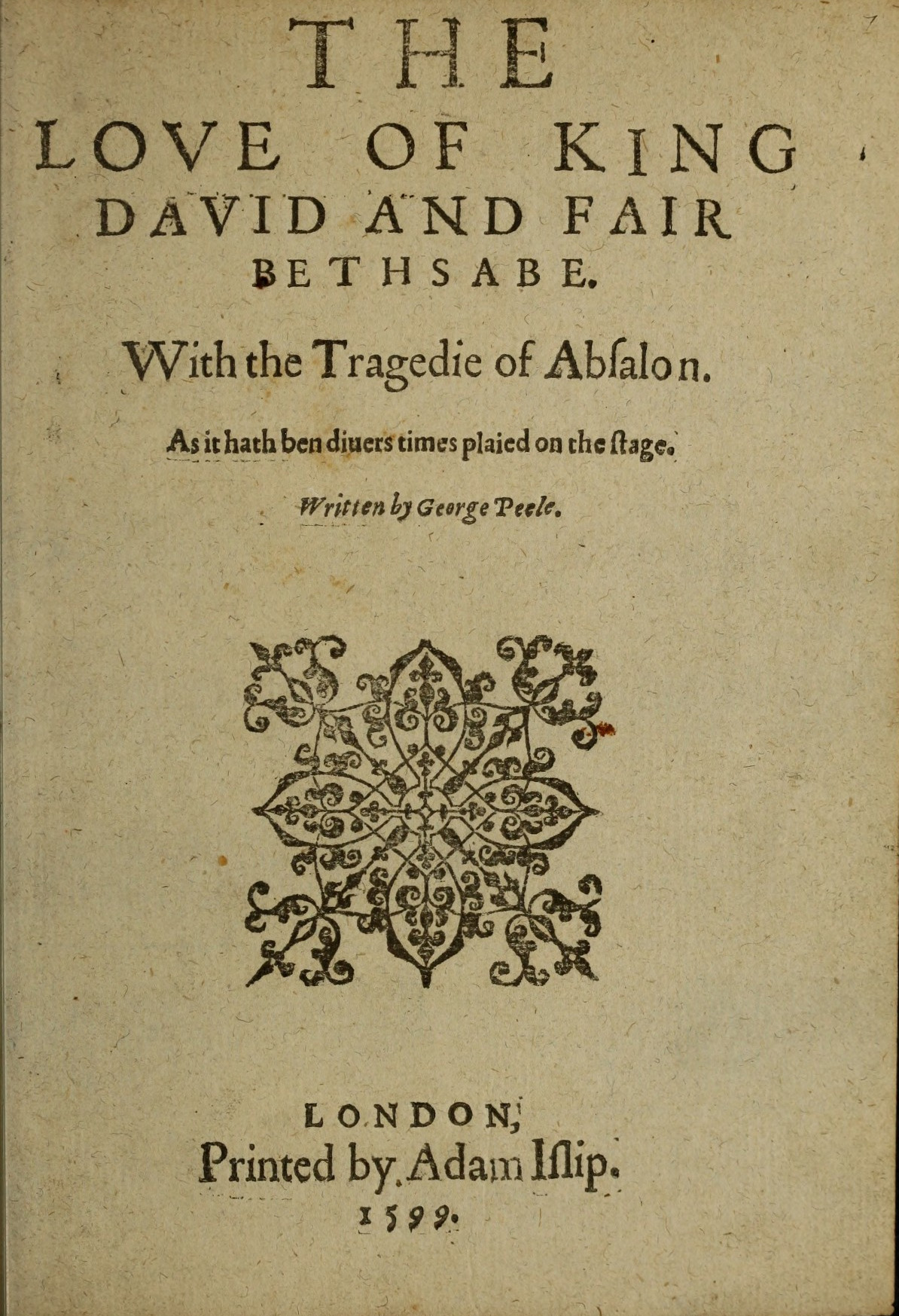
Title Page of The Love of King David and Fair Bethsabe (1599)

The Love of King David and Fair Bethsabe is a play by George Peele, based on the biblical story of David, Bathsheba, and Absalom in 2 Samuel. Probably written in the early 1590s, it was entered into the Stationers' Register on 14 May 1594 and published in 1599, after Peele's death, by the printer Adam Islip. The 1599 quarto is problematic in many respects: inconsistencies and internal contradictions, as well as one obviously misplaced fragment of a scene, have led some scholars to conclude that it is a shortened and revised version of an originally longer work.

The full title of the play, as it appears on the title page of the 1599 quarto, is The Love of King David and Fair Bethsabe, with the Tragedie of Absalon, and in its surviving form David's relationship with his sons, Absalom in particular, is the main focus of attention, rather than relationship between David and Bathsheba. Peele follows the narrative in the book of Samuel closely, but it was not his only source: he also imitated and adapted a number of passages from the Semaines of the French religious poet Guillaume Du Bartas (1544–1590).

Although few examples survive today, plays based on stories from the Bible were not uncommon in the English Renaissance theatre. Over a dozen are known to have been produced between 1588 and 1602 alone, from titles and production details preserved in sources such as the Stationers' Register and the diary of Philip Henslowe. Unlike late mediaeval mystery and morality plays, which used biblical material in very different ways, most of the lost biblical plays of the late 16th century focused on the soldier kings and prophets of the Old Testament, and reflect the political interests and theatrical conventions of other Elizabethan historical dramas.
