= The Famous Chronicle of King Edward the First =

The Famous Chronicle of King Edward the First, sirnamed Edward Longshankes, with his returne from the holy land. ALSO THE LIFE OF LLEVELLEN rebell In Wales. Lastly, the sinking of Queen Elinor, who sunck at Charingcrosse, and rose againe at Pottershith, now named Queenehith. is a play by George Peele, published 1593, chronicling the career of Edward I of England.

== Editions ==
A quarto edition duly appeared with the date 1593, printed by Abel Jeffes and sold for him by William Barley in Gracechurch Street. Copies of this edition are preserved in the Bodleian Library and the British Museum. These editions are composed with tolerable care but represent a very corrupt text. A second edition appeared in 1599.

== Plot ==
The play concentrates on the power struggle between Edward I and Llywelyn ap Gruffudd, also glancing at the reign and fall of John Balliol. The play's presentation of Llywelyn's life while in rebellion against Edward is based on the legend of Robin Hood. Although some sympathy is extended to the Welsh the playwright effectively endorses the aim of uniting Britain by force.

Heavily influenced by ballads, the play is rambling and episodic. It has been argued that the text is corrupt and that Peele did not write certain scenes, particularly a (ballad-based) deathbed confession by Queen Eleanor that of all her children, only the last, Edward of Caernarfon, is her husband's.

The first editor to break the play into scenes was Arthur Henry Bullen. The following scene breaks are based on Frank S. Hook's 1961 Yale University Press edition (spelling of character names is based on the original):

- Scene 1: 2 August 1274: Edward's return to England from the Ninth Crusade; he establishes a "colledge" [sic] for wounded soldiers (ahistorical).
- Scene 2: Introduction of the Welsh characters and their plot against England, including the comic relief group of Friar Hugh ap David, Morgan Pigott the Harper, and Jack the Novice.
- Scene 3: The Scottish pledge fealty to England. Queen Elinor's interpolated speech breaks the action. Lluellen is persuaded to allow Edward's entourage in Wales after threats to his brother, David, (including cutting his nose and threatening to put hot pincers in his eyes, reminiscent of the blinding scene in William Shakespeare's King John), and the release of his beloved, Elinor de Montfort. Two lines before Queen Elinor's speech (called such in a stage direction), she says, "Shake thy speres in honour of his name," which has led some to believe that William Shakespeare played the title role.
- Scene 4: Meredeth takes David prisoner.
- Scene 5: Battle between the Welsh and the English.
- Scene 6: Arranging the marriage of Princess Jone to Gilbert de Clare, Earl of Gloucester. At the end of the scene, we learn that Queen Elinor has gone into labour.
- Scene 7: Wooing scene in Robin Hood masquerade. Friar Hugh ap David, of course, plays Friar Tuck. Lluellen is Robin Hood, Rice is Little John, and Elinor de Montfort is Maid Marian.
- Scene 8: Mortimor, in love with Elinor de Montfort, disturbs the masquerade and battles Friar Hugh ap David as a proxy for Lluellen.
- Scene 9: John Balliol, King of Scotland, tells Lord Versses to send message to King Edward that the Scottish will no longer be subservient to England.
- Scene 10: Birth of the future Edward II in a tent in Wales, making him the first Prince of Wales. Elinor is angry at Edward for not offering her or his son enough honor, demanding that all English men will cut their beard and all English women will cut off their breasts.
- Scene 11: Friar Hugh ap David cheats a Farmer at cards and gets King Edward to take his side. In battle, King Edward downs Lluellen, and David downs Mortimor.
- Scene 12: Following the marriage of Gilbert and Joan and the christening of Prince Edward, Versses, a halter about his neck, reports to King Edward that John Balliol intends to battle King Edward. Edward gives Versses a silver chain of office (marking Versses as Edward's servant), and sends him back to Balliol.
- Scene 13: Versses returns to John Balliol. He tells Balliol he has accepted Edward's silver chain of office. The rope halter he took to Edward, he now brings back to Balliol, to signify Edward will have Balliol hanged ("I tooke the chaine and give your Grace the rope.") Balliol orders Versses hanged with the chain of office.
- Scene 14: Mortimor pursues the rebels (three lines, plus stage directions—believed to have been truncated)
- Scene 15: Queen Elinor and her servant, Katherine, bind the Mayoress (often spelled "Maris") of London to a chair and make her wet nurse an adder in a scene that anticipates Shakespeare's Antony and Cleopatra. This scene is derived and abridged from the ballads and in consequence contains curious exposition about whether the Mayoress would prefer to work as a nurse or a laundress. While dying, she calls out to "Ah husband sweete Iohn Bearmber Maior of London," a name that appears to be authorial invention.
- Scene 16: Lluellen and David flee, David with a halter around his neck ready to hang himself. David apparently does so after his final speech, while Lluellen is slain on a pike immediately after David's exit.
- Scene 17: Friar Hugh, halter about his neck, says his farewell to the dead Lluellen, but he is captured by Mortimor at the bidding of Queen Elinor.
- Scene 18: Queen Elinor blasphemes against Heaven; Heaven punishes her, and she is swallowed by a sinkhole at Charing Cross, Jone watching in horror.
- Scene 19: King Edward captures John Balliol and makes him swear allegiance to him.
- Scene 20: A Potter's Wife, and John, her serving man, witness Queen Elinor spat up by the earth at Queenhithe and come to her aid.
- Scene 21: Two messengers arrive, one alerting King Edward to David's hanging, the other to report the sinking of Queen Elinor.
- Scene 22: David is drawn on a hurdle with Mortimor and officers, accompanied by Friar Hugh, the Novice, the Morgan Pigot the Harper, and Lluellen's head on a spear.
- Scene 23: King Edward and his brother Edmund, disguised as friars, receive the deathbed confession of Queen Elinor that only Prince Edward is King Edward's son, the others all "baselie borne begotten of a Frier." Jone learns of her illegitimacy and dies of grief at the foot of the queen's bed, but not before quoting, in the original Italian, a broadly comic couplet regarding destiny from Ludovico Ariosto's Orlando Furioso (XX.131.7-8). A messenger alerts Edward that Balliol is attacking Northumberland. Edward vows to defeat "false Balliol," leaving Gilbert, Earl of Gloucester to mourn the death of Jone. In the midst of Gloucester's grieving speech, Mortimor enters with Lluellen's head, and Gloucester decides it profits him none to weep like Niobe. While scholars are not sure whether Christopher Marlowe's Edward II or Peele's Edward I was written first, there is general agreement that one play influenced the other. The stage direction of Mortimor with the head appears to be a reflection on the end of Edward II, in which Mortimer's nephew's head is brought to the newly crowned Edward III ten lines before the end of the play. Hook describes the stage direction as "surely wrong, but it comes with a grim, though unintentional, humor." (The immediately following line has Gloucester comment on Jone's teeth.) "How it happened to be inserted here, unlike the songs the Sirens sang, seems beyond conjecture. The most startling point to be noted is that Peele's 'signature' indicates that surely here the compositor was working directly from the author's manuscript."

== Characters ==
(list from Frank S. Hook's edition for Yale University Press (1961), pp. 70–71)

=== I. Speaking Parts ===
==== The English ====
- Edward I, called Longshanks, King of England
- Edmund, Duke of Lancaster, brother of the King
- Gilbert de Clare, Earl of Gloucester
- Mortimer, Earl of March
- Earl of Sussex
- Sir Thomas Spencer
- Bishop
- Soldier
- John, servant to Potter's Wife
- First Messenger
- Second Messenger
- Elinore of Castille, Queen of England
- Helinor, Queen Mother
- Joan of Acon, daughter of Queen Elinor
- Elinor de Montfort, fiancée of Lluellen
- Mary Bearmbar, wife of the Lord Mayor of London
- Katherine, lady-in-waiting to Queen Elinor
- Potter's Wife

==== The Welsh ====
- Lluellen, Prince of Wales
- David of Brecknock, Lluellen's brother
- Rice ap Meredith )
- Owen ap Rice} supporters of Lluellen
- Guenther)
- Friar Hugh ap David, called Friar Tuck
- Jack, the Friar's novice
- Morgan Pigot, the Welsh Harper
- Soldier
- Mantle Baron
- Farmer
- Peddler
- Guenthian, the Friar's wench

==== The Scots ====
- John Balliol, King of Scotland
- Lord Versses
- Scottish lord

=== II. Walk-Ons ===
- Hugh de Cressingham
- Robert Bruce
- Scottish lords (7)
- Scottish pages (9)
- Welsh barons (3)
- Negro Moors (4)
- Footmen (4)
- Barbers (2)
- Ancient
- Heralds
- Lords attendant, both English and Scottish
- Musicians
- Soldiers
- Sailors
- Nurse
- Ladies-in-waiting

Edward II is born during the play, but is never more than an infant in any of his scenes.

=== III. Unexplained characters ===
- Signor de Montfort, Earl of Leicester (l. 40, S.D.)
- Charles de Montfort (l. 40, S.D.)
- Potter (l. 2247, S.D.)
- Mary, Duchess of Lancaster (l. 1453, S.D.)

== Recent developments ==
In 1974, a "retroform" of the play prepared by G.K. Dreher was published, with the dubious scenes removed and the remaining text streamlined. Although this would be considerably easier to stage than the full text, there has to date been no modern fully-staged production.

A one-off performance of the full surviving script was given at the Sam Wanamaker Playhouse, part of Shakespeare's Globe's on 10 February 2019. Part of the theatre's Read Not Dead series, the performance was semi-staged and performed with limited rehearsal and script-in-hand before a live audience.

In Shakespeare the Player (2000), John Southworth (following the Victorian scholar F. G. Fleay) argued that the actor who had originally portrayed Edward was not, as is commonly supposed, Edward Alleyn, but William Shakespeare.
