= The Troublesome Reign of King John =

Elizabethan history play

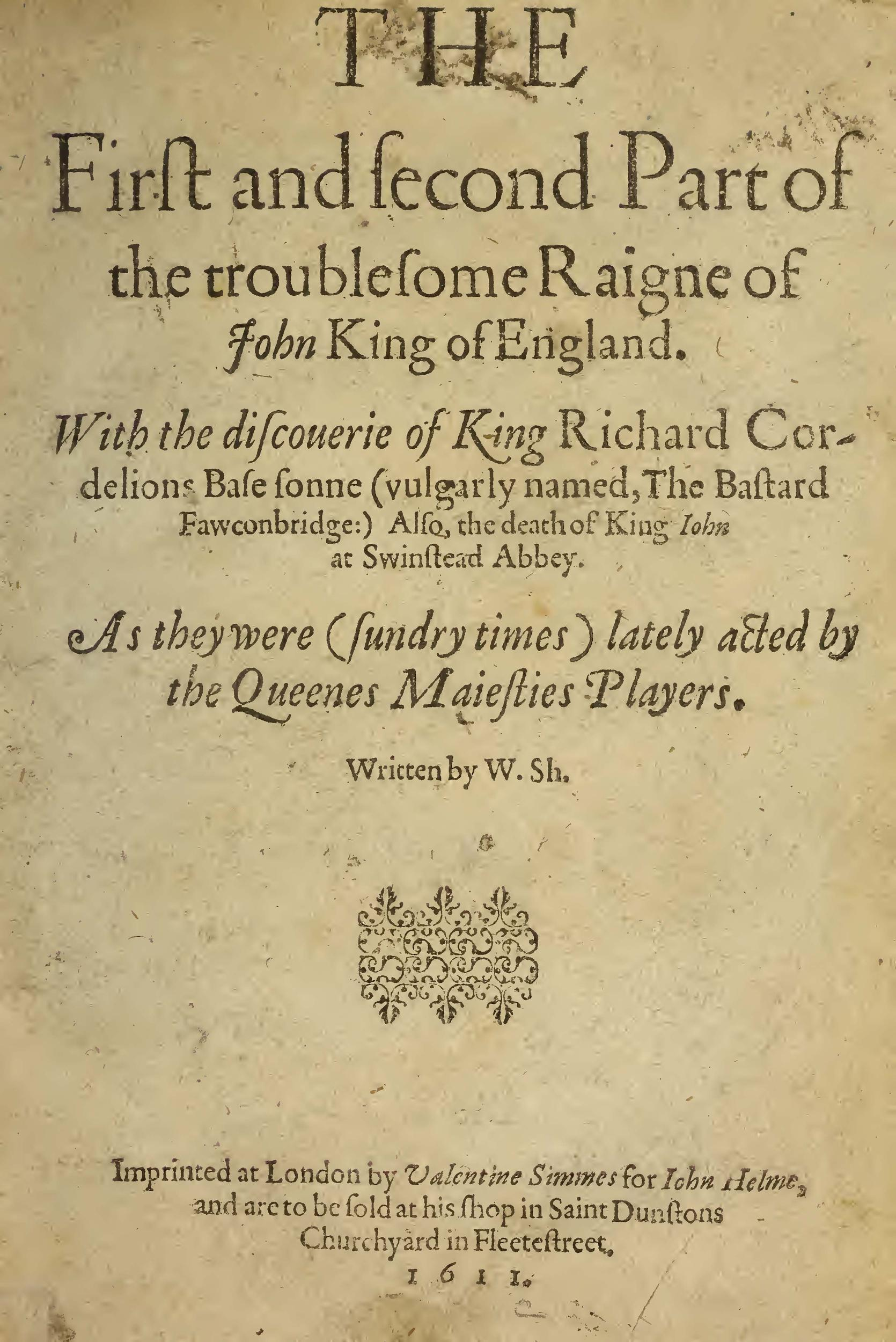
1611 quarto of The Troublesome Reign of King John, falsely attributed to "W.Sh."

The Troublesome Reign of John, King of England, commonly called The Troublesome Reign of King John (c. 1589) is an Elizabethan history play, probably by George Peele, that is generally accepted by scholars as the source and model that William Shakespeare employed for his own King John (c. 1596).

== Editions ==
The play was printed three times in quarto in Shakespeare's era:

=== First quarto ===
Q1, 1591, was published by the stationer Sampson Clarke, with no attribution of authorship. The title page of Q1 states that the play was performed by Queen Elizabeth's Men. Although The Troublesome Reign is not an exceptionally long play, about 300 lines longer than Shakespeare's, the initial publication split the play into two parts. (The scholarly literature often refers to Parts 1 and 2 of the play as a result.)

=== Second quarto ===
Q2, 1611, was published by John Helme (printed by Valentine Simmes); the authorship was assigned to "W. Sh." In this edition the first quarto's artificial division into two parts was removed.

=== Third quarto ===
Q3, 1622, was published by Thomas Dewes (printed by Augustine Matthews), as the work of "W. Shakespeare."

== Attribution ==
Some 19th-century critics accepted the 1622 attribution to Shakespeare; among 20th-century commentators E. B. Everitt and Peter Ackroyd have defended the Shakespearean attribution. Candidates put forward for the author of The Troublesome Reign include Christopher Marlowe, Robert Greene, Thomas Lodge, and George Peele, among others, alone or in various collaborative combinations; no scholarly consensus has been achieved.

== Historical sources ==
The main historical sources for The Troublesome Reign are thought to be the Chronicles of Raphael Holinshed and Foxe's Book of Martyrs, and perhaps Richard Grafton's Chronicle at Large, which recapitulates much of the material in John Foxe's book.
