= The Old Wives' Tale (play) =

English play

The Old Wives' Tale is a play by George Peele first printed in England in 1595. The play has been identified as the first English work to satirize the romantic dramas popular at the time. Although only the titles of most of these popular works have survived, they seem to be unrelated composites of popular romantic and fairy-tale motifs of the era. They were full of romantic inventions but devoid of moral content. Peele here presents an amiably ironic and exaggerated version of such a play.

The Old Wives' Tale uses the device of a play within a play to add to the confusion. Peele's version, however, was more carefully composed than similar works of the period. He distilled the romantic and fairy-tale, but he was also able to create detachment; the audience became aware of its taste for the pure romance of the fairy-tale. Some critics regard the play as intentional satire constructed to highlight generic absurdities. Peele's other plays employed a similar structure.

The play has been criticized as a "confusing jumble of theatrical nonsense" and for being a burlesque. However, some praised it as a charming fantasy, an innocent sentimental comedy. Others have called it a "fantastical comic romance".

== Plot ==
The plot centers around three young men who become lost in the woods, but are given shelter for the night by Clunch, a blacksmith, and his wife Madge (the eponymous 'old wife'). During their stay, one retires to bed with Clunch, while the other two are entertained by their hostess, who tells them a fairy-tale, which, to her surprise, comes to life: her characters appearing and telling it for her (the 'play-within-the play'). One strand of the plot involves two brothers who are on an adventure searching for their sister, Delia, who is being held captive by the magician Sacrapant (compare Milton's Comus). The magician also captures the brothers. Eventually they are all rescued by a knight aided by a ghost who is motivated by gratitude for past acts of kindness by the knight. Songs and magical invocations are interwoven into the play, imbuing it with a magical atmosphere.

== See also ==
- Old wives' tale
