= Fair Em =

16th-century English stage play

Fair Em, the Miller's Daughter of Manchester, is an Elizabethan-era stage play, a comedy written c. 1590. It was bound together with Mucedorus and The Merry Devil of Edmonton in a volume labelled "Shakespeare. Vol. I" in the library of Charles II. Though scholarly opinion generally does not accept the attribution to William Shakespeare, there are a few who believe they see Shakespeare's hand in this play.

== Publication history ==
Fair Em was published in quarto twice before the closing of the theatres in 1642:

- Q1, undated, with no attribution of authorship, was printed by "T. N. and I. W." The title page states that "it was sundrietimes publiquely acted in the honourable citie of London, by the right honourable the Lord Strange his seruaunts" – which dates the play to the 1589–93 period.
- Q2, 1631, printed by John Wright, also by no attribution of authorship. The full title as given on both editions is A Pleasant Comedie of Faire Em, the Millers Daughter of Manchester. With the love of William the Conqueror.

== Authorship ==
Edward Phillips, in his Theatrum Poetarum (1675), states that Fair Em was written by Robert Greene; but since Greene ridicules the play's author and parodies two lines from the closing scene in his 1591 pamphlet Farewell to Folly, this attribution also seems unsound. Fair Em has a clear relationship with one of Greene's plays, Friar Bacon and Friar Bungay; it seems most likely that the author of Fair Em borrowed from Greene. Since Greene's play is thought to date to c. 1589, Fair Em would have to have originated between that date and the publication of Farewell to Folly in 1591. This span of 1589–91 conforms to the dating based on the Lord Strange connection, noted above.

In modern scholarship, the attributions of authorship that have attracted the most support are to Robert Wilson and to Anthony Munday. The attribution to Munday relies on similarities between Fair Em and John a Kent and John a Cumber. A later play, John Day's The Blind Beggar of Bednal Green (1600), bears noteworthy resemblances to Fair Em. Brian Vickers attributes the play to Thomas Kyd, an ascription endorsed by Darren Freebury-Jones.

The plot derives from traditional sources; a ballad titled The Miller's Daughter of Manchester was entered into the Stationers' Register on 2 March 1581.

== Synopsis ==
In the main plot, William the Conqueror falls in love with the image on the shield that the Marquess of Lubeck carries in a tournament. In disguise, William travels to the court of King Zweno of Denmark to see the original of the portrait; once there, he falls in love with Marianna, a Swedish princess held hostage at the Danish court. Marianna, however, is faithful to her suitor, Lubeck, and has no interest in William; but the king's daughter Blanche becomes infatuated with the newcomer. The ladies stage a plot, in which William absconds with the woman he thinks is Marianne; in doing so he gets in trouble with Zweno, who is under the same mistaken impression. When the woman's true identity is revealed – she is of course Blanche – William accepts her as his wife. Lubeck and Marianne are left, happily, to each other.

In the subplot, Em, the beautiful daughter of the miller of Manchester, is wooed by three suitors, Valingford, Mountney, and Manvile. Preferring Manvile, she pretends blindness to evade Valingford, and deafness to avoid Mountney. But Manvile proves unfaithful to Em. In the end, Manvile loses both of the women he pursues, and Em marries Valingford, the only one of the three who has remained true to her; and it is revealed that Em is actually of the gentry – her father is Sir Thomas Goddard, and the miller of Manchester was his disguise. The two plots meet at the end, as William recognizes Goddard's banishment was unjust and revokes it. Em makes William realize that the world does contain virtuous women, which helps to reconcile him to his marriage with Blanche.

== Interpretations ==
A few nineteenth-century commentators (notably F. G. Fleay) read hidden significance into the play, interpreting it as an allegory on the theatrical conditions of its day. Modern scholarship rejects these views as fanciful, and regards the work as a light entertainment, successful on its own level. Speculations that Shakespeare may have played either William the Conqueror or Valingford have also not been judged favorably. Brian Vickers believes the play to be by Thomas Kyd.

== Performance ==
The first modern-day revival production of Fair Em opened in 2013 at the Union Theatre, Southwark, London. Directed by Phil Willmott, this performance ran from 8 January to 9 February.
