= The Battle of Alcazar =

Play attributed to George Peele

The Battle of Alcazar is a play attributed to George Peele, perhaps written no later than late 1591 if the play "Muly Molucco" mentioned in Henslowe's diary is this play (see below), and published anonymously in 1594, that tells the story of the battle of Alcácer Quibir in 1578.

Likely allusions to the Spanish Armada in the play appear to limit its earliest possible date. The primary historical source for the play, John Polemom's The Second Part of the Book of Battles, Fought in Our Age, was published in 1587. The play may also have been an attempt to capitalise on popular interest in the Drake-Norris Expedition, the so-called English Armada, of 1589, in which Peele was interested (see below).

== Characters (dramatis personae) ==
The Presenter, a Chorus
Abdelmelec – also known as Muly Molocco, rightful King of Morocco, uncle to the Moor
Abdil Rayes – his Queen
Calsepius Basssa – general of the Turkish troops supporting Abdelmelec
Argerd Zareo – a Moor of Argier, follower of Abdelmelec
Celybin – a captain in Abdelmelec's army
Muly Mahamet Seth – brother to Abdelmelec
Rubin Archis – widow of Abdelmelec's brother, Abdelmunen
Rubin's Young Son
Muly Mahamet – the Moor, nephew to Abdelmelec
Calypolis – Muly Mahamet's wife
Muly Mahamet's son (also named Muly Mahamet)
Pisano, Muly Mahamet's Captain
Diego Lopis, governor of Lisbon
Tom Stukley
Jonas and Hercules, captains in Stukely's service
An Irish Bishop
Sebastian, king of Portugal
The Duke of Avero
The Duke of Barceles
Lewes de Sylva
Christopher de Tavera
Don de Menysis, governor of Tangier
Lord Lodowicke Caesar
County Vinioso
Messenger
A boy serving Muly Mahamet
Attendant
Ambassadors from Muly Mahamet to the King of Portugal
Janissaries
Ladies
Rubin's young son
Two young brothers of the Moor
Two murderers
Abdelmunen, uncle to the Moor
Three Ghosts
Nemesis
Three Furies
Death
Fame

== History of the play ==
Lord Strange's Men acted a play called Muly Molloco 14 times between 21 February 1592 and 20 January 1593; this is generally thought to be The Battle of Alcazar under an alternative title (no other play about "Muly Molucco" is known from this era, and one of the characters in the play refers to another as "Muly Molucco"). A later revival of the play was staged by the Admiral's Men, either in 1598 or 1600–02. The 1594 quarto was printed by Edward Allde for the bookseller Richard Bankworth. The play was published anonymously, though the attribution to Peele rests on both internal stylistic evidence and an assignment of authorship of a quoted passage in the anthology England's Parnassus (1600). The Parnassus attribution is questionable as the person making the attribution is known to have erred in the attribution of authorship elsewhere. The surviving edition is significantly truncated.

== Analysis ==
The Battle of Alcazar is a five-act non-fiction play that tells the story of the battle. Like Shakespeare's Henry V (1599), it is narrated by a Chorus who describes the action in terms far more heroic than it warrants: King Sebastian of Portugal is referred to as "an honourable and courageous prince", but is in fact shown to be foolish in invading Morocco, having been duped by Mulai Mohammed.

The play's portrayal of the Moroccan leader has been singled out as "the first full dramatic treatment of a black Moor on the English Stage...."

The "plot" or plan for the Admiral's Men's production still exists, as MS. Add. 10,449, fol. 3, in the collection of the British Museum. Though damaged, the plot reveals most of the cast of the production, which included Edward Alleyn and Samuel Rowley among other members of the company. In comparing the plot to the play, W. W. Greg determined that the plot requires a larger cast than the printed version of the play does; he argued that the printed text was cut down from its original length to accommodate a smaller-scale production. Other scholars agree that the 1594 text was shortened, though the reason for that shortening has been disputed.

Peele was not the only English playwright to dramatise the story of Sebastian. A lost play, Sebastian, King of Portugal, was performed by the Admiral's Men in 1601. Massinger's Believe as You List (1631) was originally about Sebastian; Massinger shifted the play's setting to ancient Greece after the first version was suppressed. In the Restoration era, John Dryden wrote Don Sebastian (1689) on the same subject.

== Synopsis ==
Overview
The King of Morocco has died and his son, the villainous Muly Mahmet, has assumed the throne, a development that contravenes the normal rules of succession (the kingship should have passed to the old king’s brother, not to his son). To cement his grip on power, Muly Mahamet murders his eldest uncle, thereby making his second-oldest uncle, Abdelmelec, the rightful ruler. As the play begins, Abdelemec returns to Morocco after a period of exile in Turkey, where he had been hiding since his eldest brother (Muly Mahamet’s father) became King. With the help of an army provided by the Ottoman sultan, Abdelmelec ejects Muly Mahamet from power and assumes the throne. Eager to reclaim power, Muly Mahamet applies to the Portuguese court for military assistance, promising the King of Portugal (Sebastien) that he will make Morocco a tributary state of Portugal if he is able to recapture the throne. Sebastien agrees to the proposal, thereby setting up a sort of proxy war between Portugal and the Ottoman Empire, with the Ottomans supporting Abdelemec and Portugal supporting Muly Mahamet. The first four acts consist primarily of scenes that switch back-and-forth between the two sides, gradually building toward a spectacular battle at Alcazar in Act Five. As the battle begins, Abdelemec dies (apparently of grief) after receiving news that his army will likely lose. In an effort to maintain the soldiers’ morale, his officers prop his corpse up in order to make it appear as though he is still alive. As the battle continues, Abdelemec’s army (now led by a dead body) gains the upper hand and wins—a turnabout due in large part to some very poor military decisions made by the Portuguese King. In the end, Muly Mahamet dies, Sebastien dies, and Muly Mahamet Seth (Muly Mahamet’s youngest uncle) becomes the new king. The battle thus claims the lives of three kings: (i) King Abdelemec (who died of grief), (ii) Muly Mahamet (the ousted tyrant), and (iii) King Sebastien of Portugal.

Act 1, Prologue
The Presenter narrates a dumb show depicting the crimes of Muly Mahamet (‘the Moor’), a tyrant who has wrongfully become the King of Morocco following the death of his father, the foregoing King. (According to the rules of succession, the crown should have passed to the old King’s brothers, not to his son). To cement his grip on power, Muly Mahamet directs the smothering of his two younger brothers, a move that pre-empts the possibility that they might make a move against him in the future. When these murders are complete, he orders the strangulation of his oldest uncle (Abdelmunen), thus making his second-oldest uncle (Abdelmelec) the rightful inheritor of the crown. At the conclusion of the dumbshow, the Presenter explains that the murders have provoked a civil war, with Muly Mahamet on one side and Abdelmelec on the other.

Act 1, Scene 1: The frontier between Morocco and Algeria

Abdelmelec (the rightful ruler) returns to Morocco after a period of exile in Turkey, where he had been hiding since his eldest brother, Abdallas (Muly Mahamet’s father), became King. He is leading an army provided by the Ottoman sultan, Amurath. After proclaiming his gratitude for Amurath’s assistance, he makes plans with his followers to unseat Muly Mahamet and claim the throne.

Act 1, Scene 2: A valley north of Fez

Muly Mahamet and his son (Muly Mahamet Jr.) discuss the approach of Abdelemec’s invading army. After receiving a report of Abdelemec’s triumph, they decide to flee.

Act 2, Prologue

Act Two begins with a dumbshow wherein the ghosts of Muly Mahamet’s slain victims (his uncle Abdelmunen and his two younger brothers) cry out for vengeance, a petition that summons three Furies: “Alecto with her brand and bloody torch,” “Megaera with her whip and snaky hair,” and “Tisiphone with her fatal murdering iron.” The Presenter announces that, with the Furies’ assistance, Abdelemec’s army has triumphed, and Muly Mahamet has retreated to the wilderness. Eager to regain the crown, however, Muly Mahamet has applied to King Sebastien of Portugal for military aid.

Act 2, Scene 1: A Battlefield near Fez
In a victory speech, Abdelemec names his brother, Muly Mahamet Seth (Muly Mahamet’s youngest uncle), as his heir.

Act 2, Scene 2: Lisbon
The British adventurer, Thomas Stukley, petitions the governor of Lisbon for military assistance with a mission to Ireland. With Portugal’s help, he hopes to wrest the country from English control and bring it under control by Catholic countries. When he is left alone on stage, however, he reveals a secret ambition to become the new King of Ireland.

Act 2, Scene 3: The mountains of Northern Morocco
In a conversation with his wife (Calipolis) and son (Muly Mahamet Jr.), Muly Mahamet expresses his frustration with the life of an exiled king, then exits to go hunting. When he is gone, Calipolis tells Muly Mahamet Jr. that ambassadors have been dispatched to Lisbon to make an offer to Sebastien, the Portuguese King: if Sebastien will help Muly Mahamet to regain the Moroccan crown, Muly Mahamet will make Morocco a tributary state of Portugal. Shortly thereafter, Muly Mahamet returns with a piece of meat that he has stolen from a lioness. He offers to share the catch with Calipolis, who politely declines, protesting that her stomach is “too queasy to digest such bloody meat.”

Act 2, Scene 4: Lisbon, the Royal Palace
King Sebastien of Portugal meets with Muly Mahamet’s ambassadors, who offer a deal: Muly Mahamet will make Morocco a Portuguese tributary if Sebastien will provide support for his insurgency. In a spectacular act of self-mutilation, the ambassadors take turns holding a hand over a torch, willfully burning themselves in order certify the sincerity of Muly Mahamet’s proposal. The King agrees to the deal. After the ambassadors exit, Sebastien summons Thomas Stukley and asks him if he would like to join the campaign against Abdelemec. Surprised by this offer, Stukley reminds the King that his aim was to secure Portugal’s support for a mission to Ireland. In response, Sebastien dismisses Stukley’s chances against the English as hopeless, and launches into a lengthy (and conspicuously jingoistic) speech in praise of England’s unquestionable moral and military superiority. Despite these arguments, Stukley and his followers continue to politely insist on pursuing a mission to Ireland, rather than Morocco. Unwilling to take 'no' for an answer, the King promptly ends the negotiation by declaring that the Stukley does not have a choice: he will be pressed into service by force. Realizing that his plans to become a King have vanished, Stukley bids farewell to Ireland and resigns himself to the Moroccan adventure.

Act 3, Prologue
The account of the dumb show at the beginning of Act Three derives entirely from a damaged section of the play’s theatrical plot (a planning document used for production purposes). It entails an allegorical figure named Nemesis and the Three Furies (again), now bearing scales. One by one, the Furies bring in ghosts representing King Sebastien of Portugal, Thomas Stukley, and Muly Mahamet (three figures who will eventually die as a result of their aggression against Abdelemec). The description of the dumbshow also calls for “three vials of blood” and “a sheep’s gather,” that is to say, the liver, heart, and lungs of a cow or sheep contained within a sheep’s bladder, as in a balloon. The inclusion of this prop suggests that the plan was for the Furies to disembowel at least one of the ghosts on stage (the gather could be concealed beneath a shirt and then sliced open so that the viscera contained therein spills forth).

Act 3, Scene 1: Lisbon, the Royal Palace
A Portuguese ambassador delivers a message from the Spanish King, who has offered to give King Sebastien lands and his daughter’s hand in marriage if Sebastien will provide military support for Muly Mahamet’s insurgency. In a private conversation with one of his followers, Thomas Stukley expresses his distrust of the Spanish King.

Act 3, Scene 2: Fez, the Moroccan capital
In a conversation with his followers, Abdelemec expresses his confidence that Spain will double-cross Portugal and come to his aid.

Act 3, Scene 3: The Portuguese-held fortress at Tangier
The Portuguese Governor of Tangier and two other Portuguese officers prepare for the battle against Abdelemec as they await the imminent arrival of armies commanded by Muly Mahamet and King Sebastien of Portugal.

Act 3, Scene 4: Tangier
King Sebastien of Portugal and Muly Mahamet meet each other in person for the first time. In order to guarantee his fidelity, Muly Mahamet transfers his son over to the King’s custody.

Act 4, Prologue
The account of the dumb show at the beginning of Act Four derives entirely from a damaged section of the play’s theatrical plot (as is also the case for the dumbshow at the beginning of Act Three). It seems to describe some sort of a pantomimed banquet wherein the Furies, accompanied by an allegorical figure named Death, subject the leaders of the invasion to tortures portending their imminent doom. In the list of required props, the plot calls for “blood,” “dead men’s heads in dishes,” and “dead men’s bones.”

Act 4, Scene 1: Town of Alcazar
Abdelmelec has gathered his army at Alcazar. In a conversation with his followers, he discusses the strength of the invading forces, who seem formidable, but not especially well-organized or well-supplied. He decides to march his forces forward, meeting the enemy head-on.

Act 4, Scene 2: The Portuguese Camp North of Alcazar
Meanwhile, the situation in the Portuguese camp is becoming increasingly chaotic. King Sebastien admonishes the cowardice of his followers, who seem uncertain about his plans to rush forward into a battle at Alcazar. In an effort to inspire greater zeal, Muly Mahamet offers a misleading account of the opposing army’s tepid allegiance to Abdelemec, claiming that they are likely to switch sides as soon as they see the great forces Sebastien has brought to meet them. Buoyed by this promise, the council resolves to move forward with the attack. As soon as Sebastien and the other characters exit, however, Muly Mahamet delivers a soliloquy that reveals his cynical disregard for Portuguese lives, and his willingness to bet everything on this final, decisive confrontation.

Act 5, Prologue
In a spectacular dumbshow that involves fireworks, thunder, and lightning, an allegorical figure named Fame hangs the crowns of King Sebastien and Muly Mahamet on a tree and watches as each crown drops to the ground—a symbolic gesture that portends the rulers’ demise by figuring them as ripened fruit, falling from the branch.

Act 5, Scene 1: The battlefield at Alcazar
As the battle begins, Abdelemec dies (apparently of grief) after receiving news that his army will likely lose. In an effort to maintain the soldiers’ morale, his officers prop up his corpse in order to make it appear as though he is still alive. As the battle continues, Abdelemec’s army (now led by a dead body) begins to gain the upper hand. In another part of the battlefield, Muly Mahamet flees in fear, and a pair of disgruntled Italian soldiers attack Thomas Stukley, prompting a lengthy death speech wherein Stukley recounts his entire life story in piteous detail. Ultimately, Muly Mahamet Seth (Muly Mahamet’s youngest uncle) proclaims victory and becomes the new King of Morocco. Soldiers enter with the body of King Sebastien, who has died in battle, and Muly Mahamet, who has drowned while trying to escape. In a short closing speech, the new King gives orders to flay Muly Mahamet’s corpse and stuff the skin with straw, thereby fashioning a ghastly reminder of the consequences for iniquity.
