= Thomas Pavier =

English publisher and bookseller

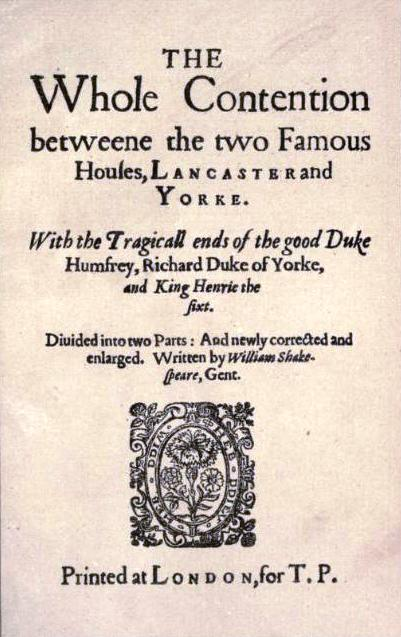
The Whole Contention Between the Two Famous Houses of York and Lancaster (1619), published by Pavier with William Jaggard as part of the False Folio of 1619.

Thomas Pavier (died 1625) was a London publisher and bookseller of the early seventeenth century. His complex involvement in the publication of early editions of some of Shakespeare's plays, as well as plays of the Shakespeare Apocrypha, has left him with a "dubious reputation."

== Life and work ==
Pavier came to the business of publishing in an unusual way: instead of serving the normal apprenticeship in the Stationers Company, he was one of several young men who transferred to the Stationers from the Drapers Company on 3 June 1600. Pavier had served an apprenticeship under William Barley, a draper who doubled as a bookseller. Pavier was able to set himself up in business that year; his shop was located at the sign of the Cat and Parrots, "over against Pope's Head Alley" in Cornhill. Early in his career Pavier was found guilty of various misdemeanours by the Court of Stationers. One conviction was 'for printing certain books and ballads without a licence' or 'without authority or entrance' in the Stationers' Register. Along with William Barley, his brother Roger and printer Simon Stafford he was also accused of illegally printing a Latin grammar manual. Four thousand copies of the book were discovered in Roger's home and confiscated by members of the Stationers' Company. In June 1598 Pavier backed Stafford in an attempt to prosecute Cuthbert Burby for riot who, along with others, had been acting for the Stationers' Company. The complaint was dismissed by the Stationers' Court and the four men found themselves incarcerated in Fleet Prison over the affair.

Over the course of his quarter-century career, Pavier grew rich by publishing popular works of Puritan literature in multiple editions. At the start of his career, however, he worked at the lower end of the prestige scale in printed matter in his era: he primarily published ballads, chapbooks, pamphlets, and playbooks. One of his earliest products in the ballad line was The Fair Widow of Watling Street and Her Three Daughters (c. 1600). He followed this with many comparable works, with titles like The Lamentable Murthers of Sir John Fitz (1605), A Cruel Murther in Worcestershire (1605), The Fire in Shoreditch (1606), The Traitors' Downfall (1606), The Shepherd's Lamentation (1612), and The Burning of Tyverton (1612). He also published ballads by Thomas Deloney and Samuel Rowlands.

Pavier's firm prospered and he eventually rose to be his guild's Junior Warden in 1622, but Pavier never abandoned ballads. In the years 1612–20, when the Stationers Company limited ballad printing to only five of its members, Pavier was one of the five. In 1624 he was a member of the "Ballad Stock," a syndicate of stationers dedicated to the production of ballads in print.

== Drama ==
One of Pavier's earliest acts as a stationer was to enter the popular though anonymous play Captain Thomas Stukeley into the Stationers' Register on 11 August 1600 (though the earliest edition now known was Pavier's of 1605). He published several other plays, including the anonymous The Fair Maid of Bristow (1605), and The First Part of Hieronimo (1605), the anonymous "prequel" to Thomas Kyd's The Spanish Tragedy. Pavier also published editions of Kyd's play: he obtained the rights to The Spanish Tragedy on 14 August 1600 and issued the fourth edition in 1602. He published the third quarto of A Looking Glass for London, by Thomas Lodge and Robert Greene, also in 1602, and the second quarto of the anonymous Jack Straw in 1604.

== Shakespeare ==
Thomas Pavier is best remembered for his editions of Shakespearean plays, and plays of the Shakespeare Apocrypha:

- Sir John Oldcastle – he registered the play on 11 August 1600 and published it before the end of that year. This first quarto was issued anonymously; the attribution to Shakespeare would not appear until 1619.
- Henry V – Pavier obtained the rights to the play, first printed in 1600, from Thomas Millington and John Busby, on 14 August 1600; he published the second quarto of Henry V in 1602.
- Henry VI, Part 2 and Henry VI, Part 3 – Pavier secured the rights to the previously printed versions of these plays from Thomas Millington on 19 April 1602. These were the early alternative versions of the two plays, short-titled The First Part of the Contention Betwixt the Two Famous Houses of York and Lancaster and The True Tragedy of Richard Duke of York. Pavier did not publish the plays immediately, however; they did not appear in print again until they were included in the so-called False Folio affair (see below).
- A Yorkshire Tragedy – Pavier registered the play on 2 May 1608, and published it that year with a title-page attribution to Shakespeare.

== False Folio ==
Most controversially, Pavier was somehow involved with William Jaggard in the cryptic False Folio affair of 1619, which involved the publication of ten Shakespearean and pseudo-Shakespearean plays in quarto editions, some with falsified title pages. The early versions of 2 and 3 Henry VI were printed in one volume, titled The Whole Contention Between the Two Famous Houses of York and Lancaster. This volume and four others – Henry V, Sir John Oldcastle, A Yorkshire Tragedy, and Pericles, Prince of Tyre – were issued with the initials "T. P." on their title pages. The only complete extant copy of the False Folio resides at the Folger Shakespeare Library in Washington, D.C.

Among the many points about the False Folio that are uncertain and obscure is Pavier's precise role in the matter. Pavier was a business associate of Jaggard; but the real nature of his connection is debated by scholars. Some modern commentators argue that Pavier's role in the matter may have been more substantive than Jaggard's, and call the disputed texts the "Pavier quartos." In any event, Shakespeare scholars would come to refer to Pavier as a 'notorious piratical publisher'.

== Other connections ==
Pavier had other, minor links with the Shakespeare canon. When Thomas Millington transferred his rights to 2 and 3 Henry VI in 1602, Millington's copyright to Titus Andronicus was included in the deal. Pavier, however, did not publish an edition of that play; the next, third edition of 1611 was issued by another bookseller, Edward White.

In 1608, Pavier published a volume titled The History of Hamblet. This featured the Hamlet story as recorded in Shakespeare's sources, the Historia Danica of Saxo Grammaticus and the Histoires Tragiques of François de Belleforest. The book was likely published to capitalize on the popularity of Shakespeare's play.
