= A Yorkshire Tragedy =

1608 play by Thomas Middleton

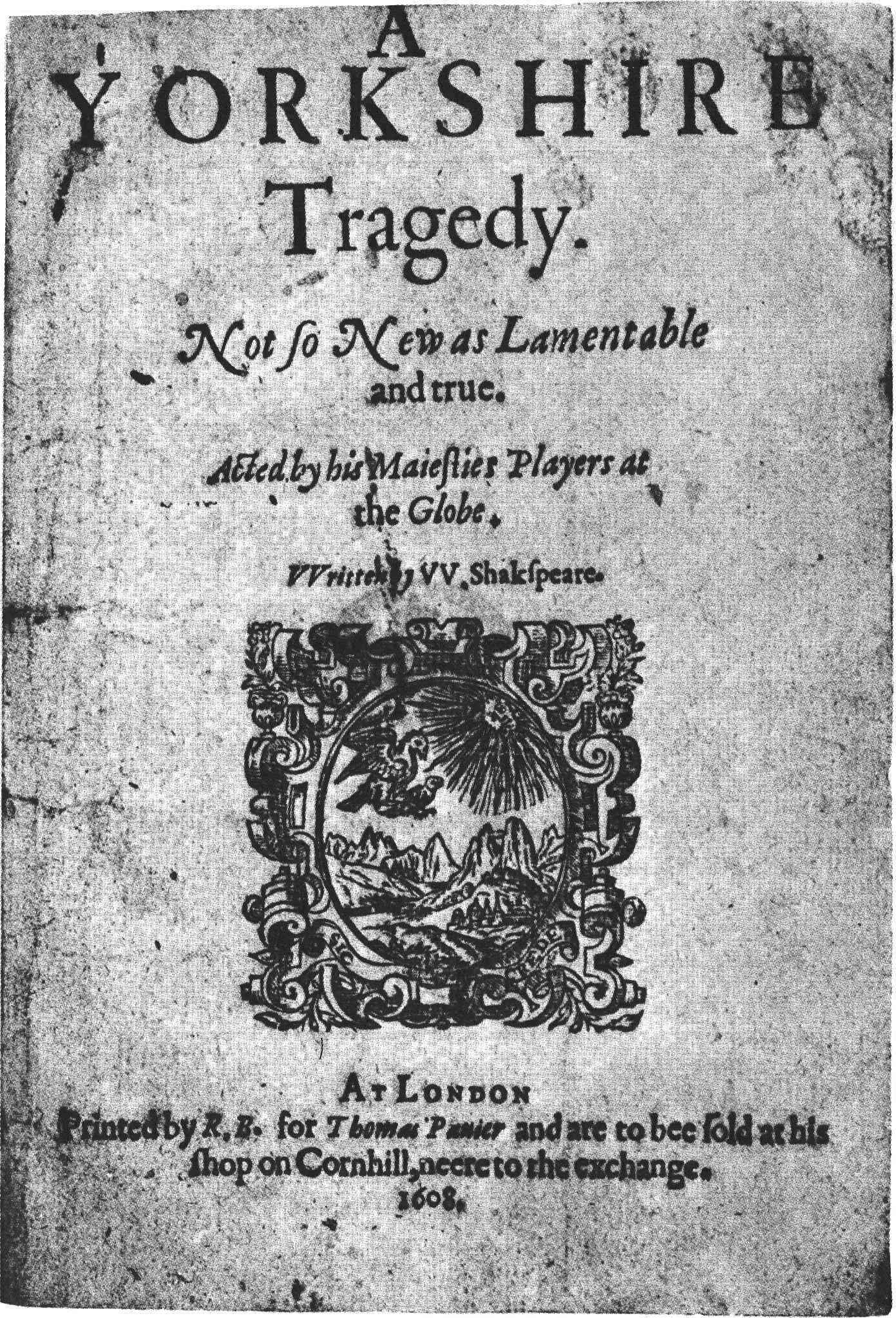
Title page of the 1608 quarto, showing the attribution to Shakespeare

A Yorkshire Tragedy is an early Jacobean era stage play, a domestic tragedy printed in 1608. The play was originally assigned to William Shakespeare, though the modern critical consensus rejects this attribution, favouring Thomas Middleton.

== Date and text ==
A Yorkshire Tragedy was almost certainly written in 1605, before Walter Calverley was pressed to death: Jacobean audiences liked moral endings, especially grisly ones, but the play ends with the Husband's fate unresolved. It was entered into the Stationers' Register on 2 May 1608; the entry assigns the play to "Wylliam Shakespere." The play was published soon after, in a quarto issued by bookseller Thomas Pavier, who had published Sir John Oldcastle, another play of the Shakespeare Apocrypha, in 1600.

The play was reprinted in 1619, as part of William Jaggard's False Folio. It was next reprinted in 1664, when Philip Chetwinde included it among the seven plays he added to the second impression of the Shakespeare Third Folio.

== Form and genre ==
The play is unusual in consisting of only ten scenes. The original printed text of the play identifies it as "ALL'S ONE. OR, One of the foure Plaies in one, called a York-Shire Tragedy...." This plainly implies that the existing play was one of a quartet of related works that were performed on stage together. In that respect it must have resembled Four Plays, or Moral Representations, in One, from c. 1608–13, a play in the John Fletcher canon in which Fletcher wrote the last two parts of the quartet, while another playwright, most likely Nathan Field, wrote the others. Other examples of such anthologies of short plays from the English Renaissance can also be given; see, for instance, The Seven Deadly Sins. The nature and authorship of the three lost pieces that accompanied A Yorkshire Tragedy is unknown.

Scene 1 is very different from the other scenes, being a prologue, with different characters. The rest of the play has the same content as the first half of the pamphlet Two most unnaturall and bloodie Murthers, which was entered in the Stationers' Register on 12 June 1605. Whether the pamphlet plagiarized the play as performed in 1605 or the play was based on the pamphlet is unresolved.

The play's genre is that of the domestic tragedy, a subgenre of the English Renaissance theatre focusing on the downfalls of ordinary middle-class people. One of the earliest examples is Arden of Faversham, which also belongs in the Shakespeare Apocrypha.

== Sources ==
The plot of the play is based on the life of Walter Calverley of Calverley Hall, Yorkshire, who was executed on 5 August 1605 for murdering two of his children and stabbing his wife. It confounds the Walter Calverley of the murders with another Walter Calverley (probably his uncle) who matriculated at Cambridge in 1579 with his brother but who dropped out, leaving his brother to complete his degree. The crimes were a well-known scandal of the day; a pamphlet on the case was issued in June 1605, with a ballad following in July. The chronicler Edmund Howes reported the case in his continuation of Stow's Annals. The case was also dramatised in a play titled The Miseries of Enforced Marriage (1607), by George Wilkins. Scholars have disagreed on the relationship between Wilkins's play and A Yorkshire Tragedy; some have seen one play as a source for the other, or even the work of the same author, while others regard the two dramas as essentially separate works.

== Authorship ==
In the Stationers' Register of 2 May 1608, the entry for A Yorkshire Tragedy ascribes authorship to "William Shakespere." The title page of the published quarto repeats the attribution to "W. Shakspeare," and states that the play was acted by the King's Men (Shakespeare's company) at the Globe Theatre. While some early critics allowed the possibility of Shakespeare's authorship, most, over the past two centuries, have doubted the attribution. The modern critical consensus favours the view that the play was written by Thomas Middleton, citing internal evidence from the text of the play. Cases for the authorship of Thomas Heywood or George Wilkins have been made, but have convinced few commentators.

== Performance history ==
The title page of the quarto claims that the play was first acted by the King's Men at the Globe Theatre (though these sources are not always reliable). No other record of historical performance exists. In the modern age, edited adaptations of the play have been performed by the Birmingham Repertory Company (1958, directed by Bernard Hepton), The Globe Theatre, Los Angeles, 1987, directed by R. Thad Taylor, Starring Guy Masterson (formerly Guy Mastroianni), the National Theatre (1987, directed by Stephen Unwin), by Tough Theatre at the White Bear Theatre Club (2010, directed by Andy Brunskill) and Titchfield Festival Theatre at The Great Barn (2024, directed by Johnny O'Hanlon).

== Characters ==
- Oliver, Ralph and Sam, serving-men of a house in Yorkshire (Scene 1 only)
- A boy
- The Wife
- The Husband
- Four men
- A servant
- The Master of a college
- The Son
- A maid
- A lusty servant
- Knight, a magistrate
- Officers

== Synopsis ==
Note: This synopsis follows the scene divisions from Stanley Wells' edition of the play in Thomas Middleton: The Collected Works (eds John Lavagnino and Gary Taylor, Oxford, 2007). Other editions divide the play into ten scenes, rather than eight, by splitting Scene Five into three separate scenes.

=== Scene 1: A house in Yorkshire ===
The play opens with a conversation among three servants of an anonymous Yorkshire gentleman, who is returning to his country house after a long sojourn in London. Sam, who has returned with his master, explains to Ralph and Oliver that their master has abandoned his local fiancée to marry another young woman: "he's married, beats his wife, and has two or three children by her." Sam also details his master's fondness for drunkenness, and sets the mood for what follows.

=== Scene 2: Outside the Husband's house, near Yorkshire ===
The Wife has an opening soliloquy, "What will become of us?," which fills out the picture of the Husband's devotion to drink and gambling and riotous behaviour. The Husband enters. He provides quick justification for the Wife's worry with his cruel words and general bad behaviour. The Wife begs him to modify his behaviour for the sake of his children. He replies by saying his sons are bastards, begot from his wife's adulterous affairs. The Wife continues to beg him to reform. He kicks her and demands that she go to London to see her uncle so that the lands from her dowry can be sold for cash. The Wife agrees to leave right away. She exits. Three local Gentlemen (otherwise unnamed) enter. They reprove the Husband and urge his reform. One of the Gentlemen is so persistent that the Husband loses his temper and draws his sword. The two fight, and the Husband is left wounded on the floor—but he retains his unrepentant attitude.

=== Scene 3: The Husband's house, a room above ===
The wife has just returned from her uncle in London. She tells a servant that, rather than selling the lands from her dowry, she has convinced her uncle to get her husband a place at court. She hopes that this measure will save her husband's reputation and keep him out of bankruptcy. The Husband enters. He demands to see the money from the sale of the dowry lands. The Wife tells him that she has gotten him a place at court instead. The Husband flies into a vicious rage. He calls his wife "whore" and "slut" and threatens her with a dagger. Further violence is interrupted when a servant enters and tells the Husband that he has a visitor: the Master of his college from university. The husband exits to greet his visitor. The Wife is relieved to have escaped her husband's wrath. She worries about her family's future.

=== Scene 4: The Husband's house ===
The Master has bad news for the Husband: the Husband's brother—a student whom the university had great hopes for—has been thrown in prison as a result of the Husband's unpaid debts. The Husband is shocked to hear this news. The Master goes on to scold the Husband for his scandalous misbehavior. The Husband seems genuinely repentant. He promises to do whatever he can to secure his brother's release. The Master exits. Left alone, the Husband plunges into a deep despondency over his moral decline. He laments his wretched state in a soliloquy that begins with the line "Oh thou confused man, thy pleasant sins have undone thee, thy damnation has beggared thee!" (Commentators who allow a possibility of a Shakespearean contribution to the play tend to centre their attention on this fourth scene and this soliloquy). The Husband's eldest son enters and tells his father to move so he can play with his toys. In a fit of passion, the Husband decides to kill his children to save them from the poverty that he sees in his future. He picks his eldest son up with one hand and draws his dagger with the other. Frightened, the boy begs him to stop. The Husband strikes his son and stabs him with the dagger.

=== Scene 5: The Husband's house, the bedroom above ===
A maid holds the Husband's second-youngest son while the Wife sleeps. The Husband enters carrying his elder son, who is bleeding, but still alive. He tells the maid to hand the baby over. The maid struggles with him. The Husband throws the maid down the stairs. The baby falls on the floor and is hurt. The Wife awakens and scoops the baby up. The Husband stabs at the baby in his wife's arms. Injured, the Wife falls to the floor. A strong ("lusty") servant enters and tries to restrain the Husband. They wrestle. The Husband overpowers the servant and kicks him with his spurs. The servant is seriously injured. The Husband flees, planning to murder the third and youngest of his children, who is living with its wet nurse nearby. (Some editors insert a scene break at this point). The action is transferred outside. The Master meets the Husband as he leaves the house. He asks the cause of the Husband's excited demeanor. The Husband waves off the Master's concerns. He repeats his promise to secure his brother's release from prison and exits hastily. (Some editors insert a scene break at this point as well). The action now returns to the bedroom above, where the servant, the Wife, and the children are lying on the floor, all seriously injured. The Master enters with his two servants. They are shocked by the bloody spectacle. The Master calls for a doctor. The injured servant tells the Master that the Husband is on his way to kill his third child. The Master and his two servants exit in hot pursuit. The Wife regains consciousness and laments the fate of her two children, who have apparently died. Two servants enter and tell the Wife that a doctor is waiting for her downstairs.

=== Scene 6: A road just outside Yorkshire ===
The Husband is thrown off his horse. The Master and his servants enter. They apprehend the Husband and make plans to take him to the Knight, who serves as the local justice of the peace.

=== Scene 7: The Knight's house ===
The Husband is brought as a prisoner to the Knight's house. The Knight asks the cause of the Husband's "monstrous cruelty." The Husband tells him that he killed his children so they would not become beggars. His only regret is that he was unable to kill his third child. The Knight is shocked by the Husband's stoicism. He sends him off to jail to await his trial, which will take place on the following day.

=== Scene 8: Outside the Husband's house ===
In the final scene, the Husband is brought in custody past his ancestral home. His Wife is recovering from her wounds, and the bodies of the murdered children are laid out for burial. The Husband is finally repentant and contrite over his actions... too late for any restoration. Escorted by officers, he departs for his trial. The Wife makes plans to beg for her Husband's pardon. The Master expresses his grief at the family tragedy.
