= False Folio =

Early collection of plays attributed to Shakespeare

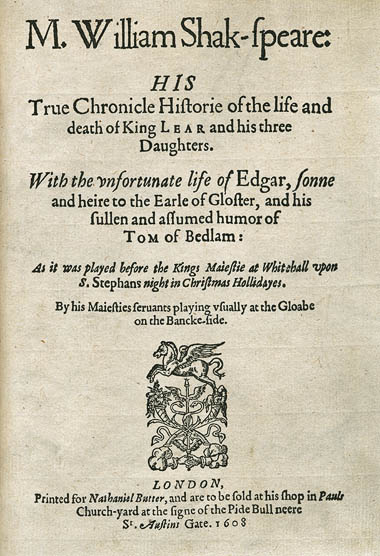
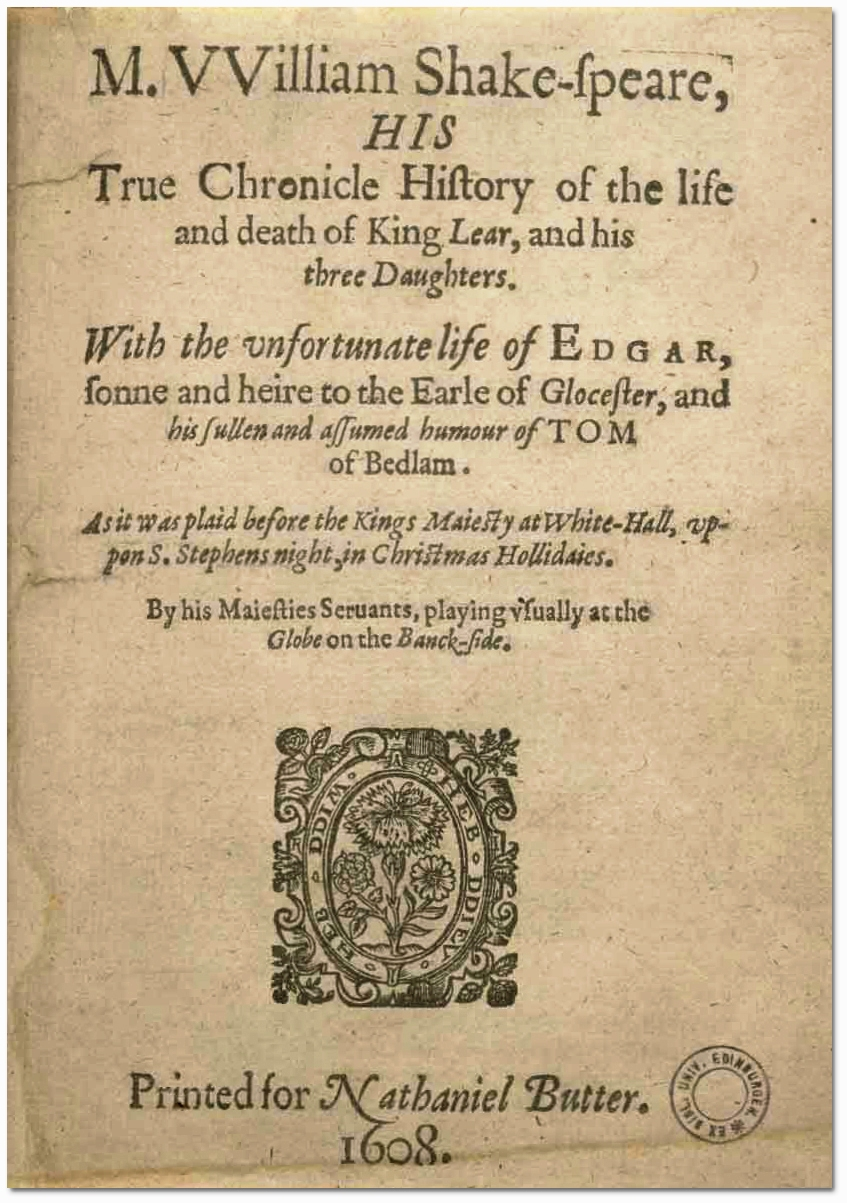
From left: Title page of Shakespeare's King Lear as published by Nathaniel Butter in 1608, and the falsely-dated title page of the quarto published by William Jaggard and Thomas Pavier in 1619.

False Folio is the term that Shakespeare scholars and bibliographers have applied to William Jaggard's printing of ten Shakespearean and pseudo-Shakespearean plays together in 1619, the first attempt to collect Shakespeare's works in a single volume. Publisher and bookseller Thomas Pavier is also implicated with 'printed for T.P.' appearing on the title pages.

There are only two complete extant copies. One is part of the collection of the Folger Shakespeare Library in Washington, DC. The other is held in the Special Collections at Texas Christian University in Fort Worth, Texas.

== Term ==
The term "false folio" intentionally evokes the folio collections of Shakespeare's works that appeared later: the First Folio of 1623 and its three seventeenth-century successors. The description "folio" is not strictly accurate, since the ten plays were printed in a larger-than-usual quarto format, not in folio; but the key qualifier is false folio. Modern commentators argue that Pavier's role may have been more substantive than Jaggard's, and call the disputed texts the 'Pavier Quartos'. Laoutaris (2023) uses the term the 'Pavier–Jaggard Quartos' to better reflect the collaboration involved in their creation.

The texts in question were first examined with modern bibliographic procedures primarily by Alfred W. Pollard, W. W. Greg, and William J. Neidig. Pollard provides a detailed account in his Shakespeare Folios and Quartos.

== Contents ==
In summary, the stationer and printer William Jaggard reprinted ten plays in 1619, either to be bound together in a single volume or issued separately depending on customer choice. Jaggard, however, did not have clear title to all of the plays involved (see: Stationers Company; Stationers' Register), and therefore he printed some of the texts with false dates and the names of the original stationers involved on the title pages – in effect reproducing the appearance of the earlier quartos. The ten plays were:

- Henry V – "printed for T. P. 1608" on the title page. False date. Thomas Pavier was the stationer who possessed the rights to Henry V, and was an associate of Jaggard.
- King Lear – "Printed for Nathaniel Butter 1608." False date and name. Nicholas Okes had printed Q1 of Lear for Butter in 1608.
- The Merchant of Venice – "Printed by J. Roberts, 1600." False date and name. This was one play to which Jaggard did not have valid title; it belonged to stationer Laurence Hayes.
- The Merry Wives of Windsor – "Printed for Arthur Johnson, 1619." False date and name. Johnson published Q1 of Merry Wives in 1602.
- A Midsummer Night's Dream – "Printed by James Roberts, 1600." False date and name.
- Pericles, Prince of Tyre – "Printed for T. P. 1619", date "corrected" to 1609 in second state.
- Sir John Oldcastle – "printed for T. P. 1600". False date.
- A Yorkshire Tragedy – "Printed for T. P. 1619."
- The Whole Contention Between the Two Famous Houses, Lancaster and York – "Printed at London, for T. P." This was the major innovation of the collection: Jaggard joined two previously separate texts, after Pavier had acquired the rights to both plays from Thomas Millington in 1602.
  - The First Part of the Contention Betwixt the Two Famous Houses of York and Lancaster, the early version of Henry VI, Part 2, published by Millington in 1594 and 1600;
  - The True Tragedy of Richard Duke of York, the early version of Henry VI, Part 3, published by Millington in 1595 and 1600.

Pericles was printed after The Whole Contention, since their signatures (the alphanumeric designations of the quires in sequence) run together; but the nine plays were apparently bound together in no particular order. (The few existing collections vary).

== Legal considerations and Jaggard's motivation ==
As Jaggard lacked rights to Hayes' Merchant of Venice, he may also have lacked rights to Butter's Lear and Johnson's Merry Wives. There is much about the False Folio affair that remains unclear, such as subjective questions of Jaggard's motivation. Jaggard had a previous odd connection with the Shakespeare canon: he had printed the questionable miscellany The Passionate Pilgrim as Shakespeare's in 1599 and 1612. Some Shakespeare scholars have wondered why the King's Men used Jaggard as the printer and one of the publishers of the First Folio, just a couple of years after the False Folio affair. (Work on the First Folio began almost certainly in 1621.) It may have been a case of necessity, since Jaggard had a large-capacity print shop. (He had demonstrated his ability to print a volume of ten plays.) Pavier's role in the matter is also debated; his initials occur on five of the nine volumes (six of the ten plays), and some contemporary commentators see Pavier's role as more significant than Jaggard's – referring to the books as the "Pavier quartos" instead of the "False Folio."

Pollard focused much of his attention on the concept of literary "piracy," and his viewpoint coloured much of the scholarly attitude and approach to the False Folio during the twentieth century. By the start of the twenty-first century, some researchers began to take a less melodramatic and more nuanced view of the questions involved, a view that no longer casts Jaggard and Pavier as the villains in a moral contest.

== Gallery ==
The gallery below is a comparison between authorised quartos and Pavier's misdated quartos:

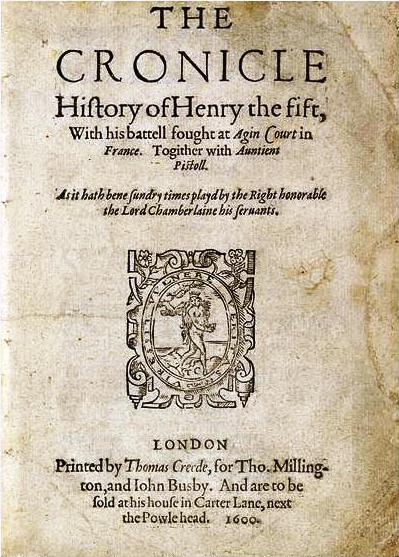
First edition Henry V (1600).

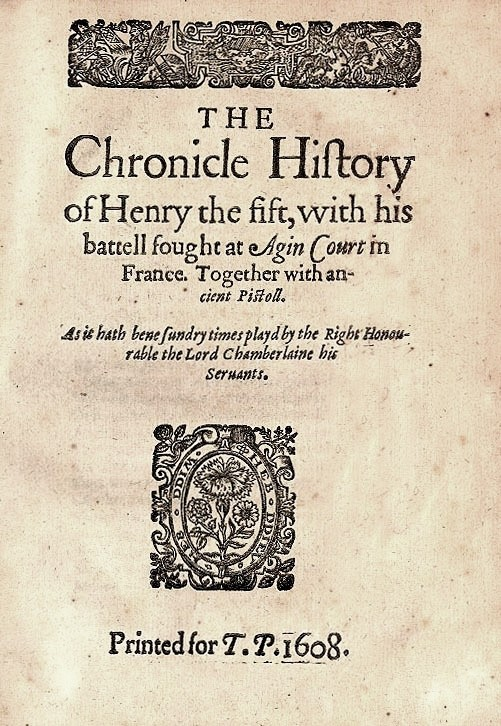
Falsely dated Henry V (1619).

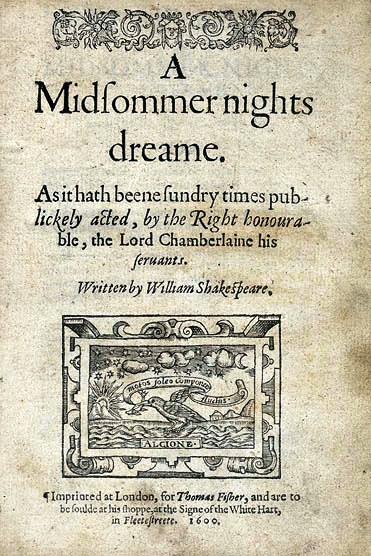
First edition Midsummer Night's Dream (1600).

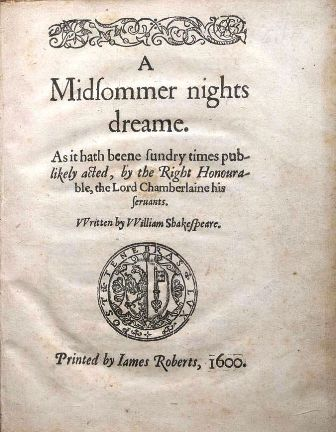
Falsely dated Midsummer Night's Dream (1619).

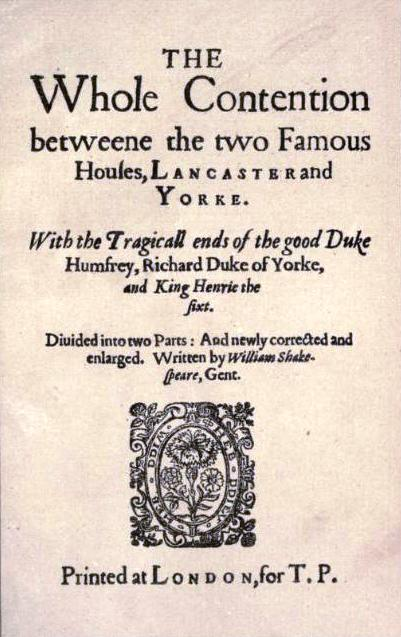
The Whole Contention Between the Two Famous Houses of York and Lancaster (1619) combined Shakespeare's King Henry VI parts 2 and 3.

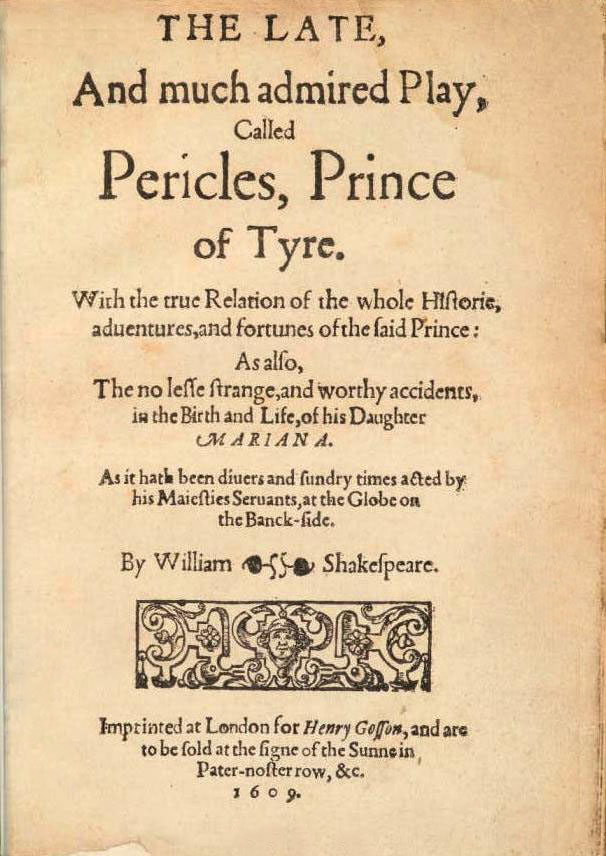
First edition Pericles (1609).

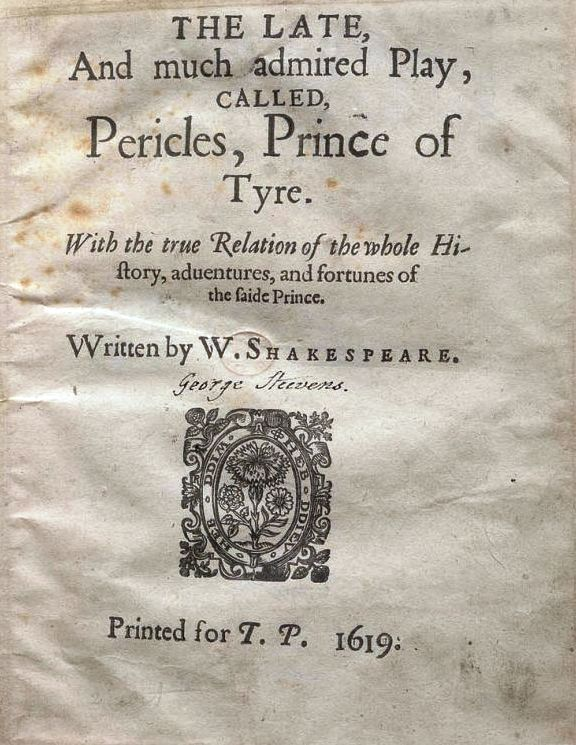
Pavier's unauthorised Pericles (1619), first state.

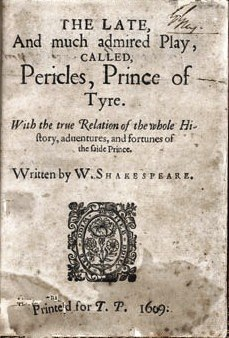
Falsely dated Pericles (1619), second state.

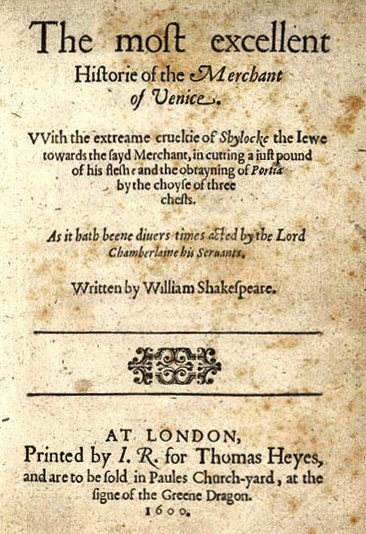
First edition Merchant of Venice (1600)

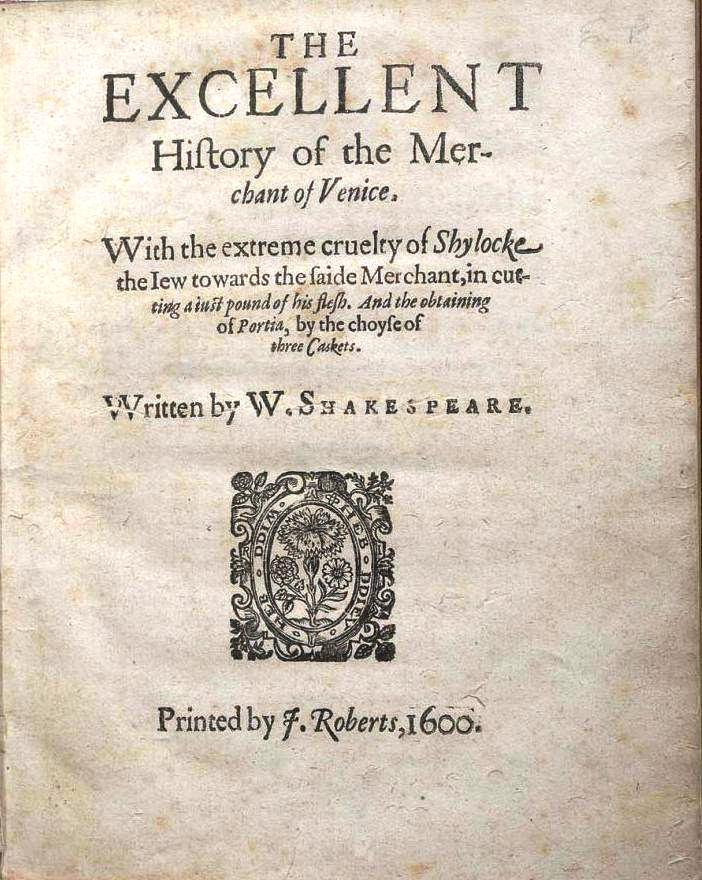
Falsely dated Merchant of Venice (1619).

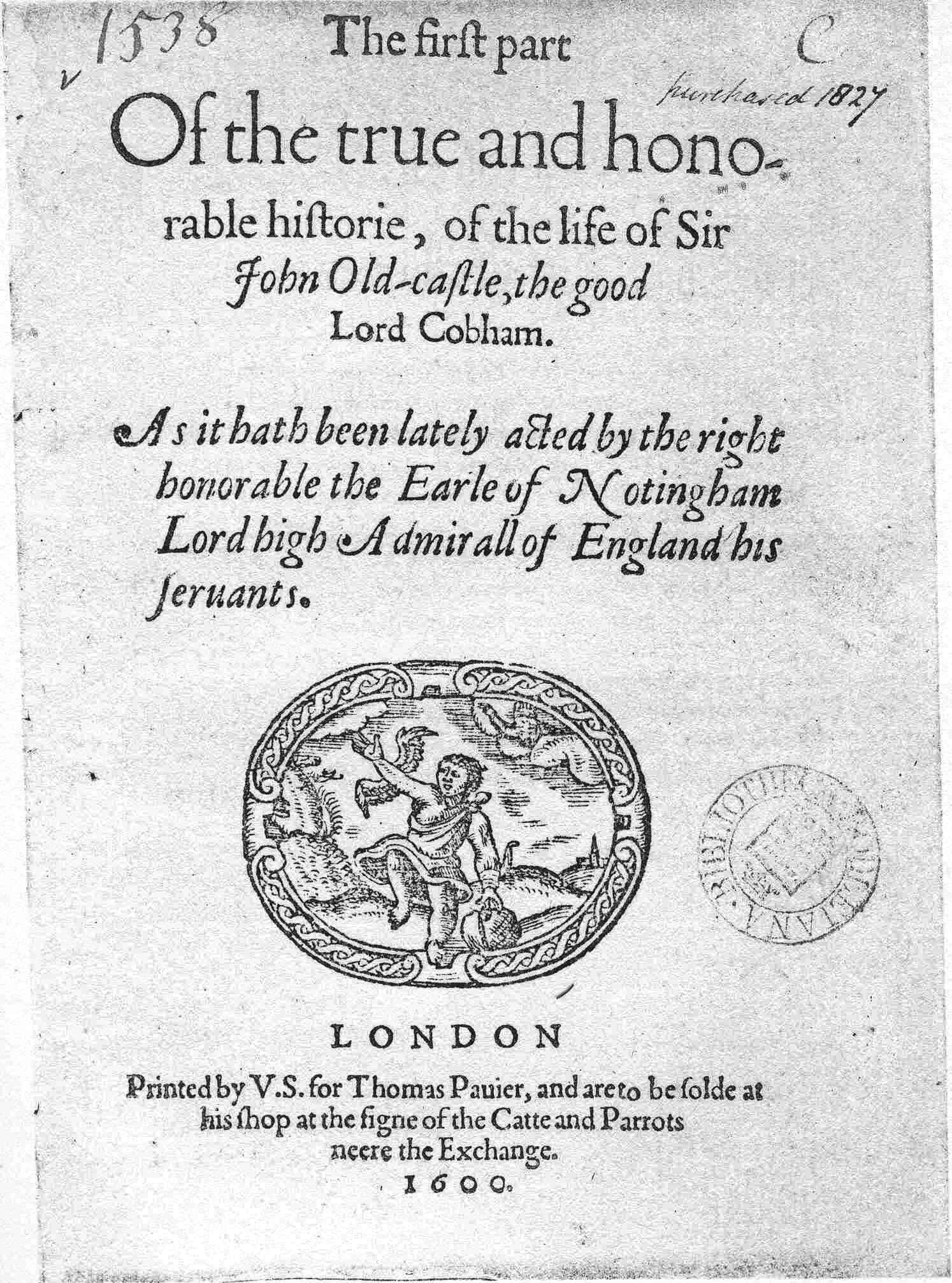
First edition Sir John Oldcastle (1600)

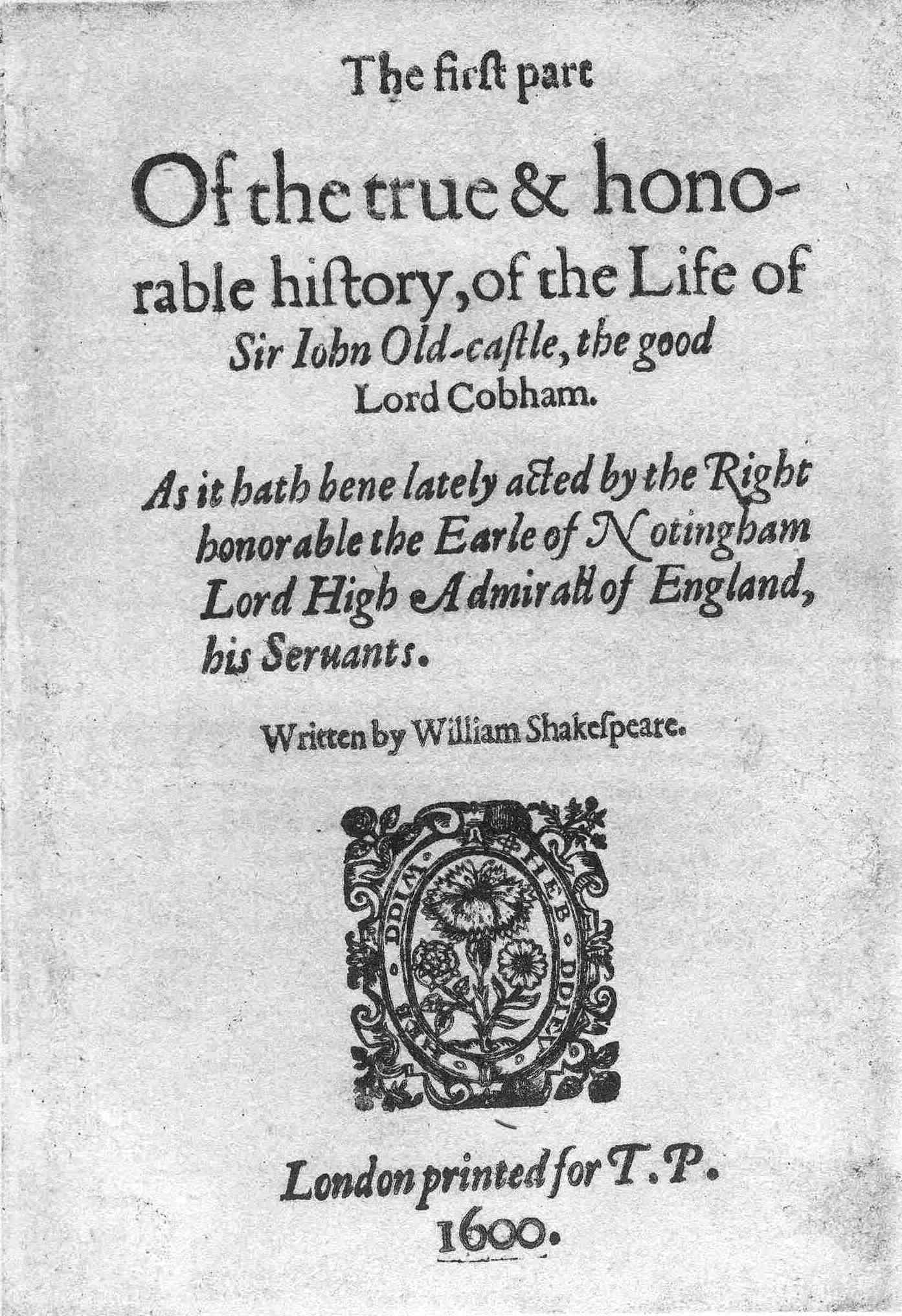
Falsely dated and attributed Sir John Oldcastle (1619)

== See also ==
- Bad quarto
- 1619 in literature
