= Philip Chetwinde =

Seventeenth-century English bookseller

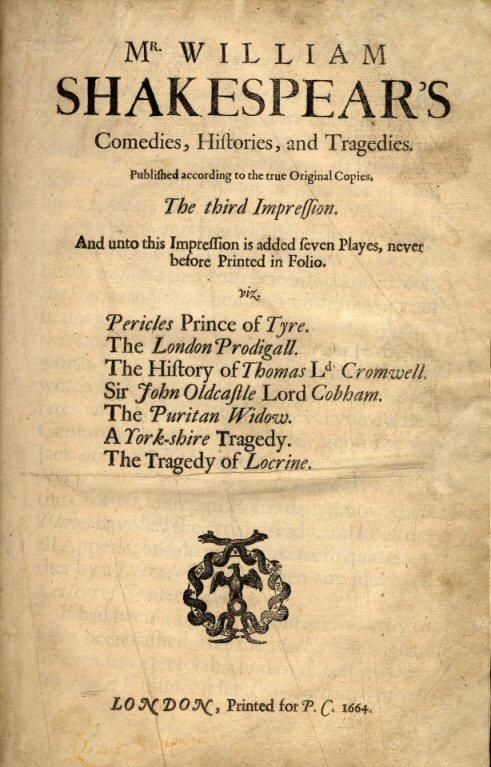
The additional plays section in the 1664 second impression of Chetwinde's Third Folio.

Philip Chetwinde (fl. 1653–1674) was a seventeenth-century London bookseller and publisher, noted for his publication of the Third Folio of Shakespeare's plays.

== A rough start ==
Chetwinde was originally a clothworker. Through his 1637 marriage to Mary Allot, the widow of Second Folio publisher Robert Allot, Chetwinde acquired rights to Allot's published works – which included the rights to a substantial portion of the dramatic output of both Shakespeare and Ben Jonson. Chetwinde attempted to move into the publishing business after his marriage; but he faced opposition from the established booksellers and publishers, since he had not risen through the apprentice system of the Stationers Company. Chetwinde used his rights to Jonson's works in the publication of the Second Jonson folio of 1640–1, though that volume's publisher of record was Richard Meighen. It was not until 1653 that Chetwinde was able to operate fully as a stationer.

== Shakespeare ==
In 1663, he employed his rights to Shakespeare's plays to publish the Third Folio, a corrected reprint of the Second Folio of 1632. The Third Folio was printed by Alice Warren, Roger Daniel, and either Thomas Ratcliffe or John Hayes. (In the seventeenth century and earlier, the functions of printers and publishers were largely [though not absolutely] separate; booksellers chose works to publish and commissioned printers to print them.)

In the following year, 1664, Chetwinde issued a second impression of the Third Folio, to which he added seven plays: Locrine, The London Prodigal, The Puritan, Sir John Oldcastle, Thomas Lord Cromwell, A Yorkshire Tragedy, and Pericles, Prince of Tyre. Only the last of these, Pericles, is accepted by the modern critical consensus as, even in part, authentically Shakespearean in authorship; the other six are part of the Shakespeare Apocrypha.

== Career ==
Like virtually all the publishers of his time and place, Chetwinde produced an abundant supply of religious works; Bishop Bayly's The Practice of Piety, which Chetwinde issued in multiple editions, is only one example.

Chetwinde was unusual among London publishers of his generation in that he published books in the Welsh language. It can be noted that Chetwinde worked, with some frequency, with female printers – the widows of printers who had continued their late husbands' businesses. Alice Warren, as noted, worked on the Third Folio; some of Chetwinde's Welsh-language books were printed by Ellen Cotes and Sarah Griffin.
