= Thomas Millington (publisher) =

English publisher (fl. 1591–1603)

Thomas Millington (fl. 1591–1603) was a London publisher of the Elizabethan era, who published first editions of three Shakespearean plays. He has been called a "stationer of dubious reputation" who was connected with some of the "bad quartos" and questionable texts of Shakespearean bibliography.

== Life and work ==
He was the son of a William Millington, a "husbandman" of Hamptongay, Oxfordshire, and was apprenticed to a Henry Carre for a period of eight years, beginning on St. Bartholomew's Day (24 August) in 1583. Thomas Millington became a "freeman" (full member) of the Stationers Company on 8 November 1591. For a time he was in partnership with fellow guild member Edward White; their shop was located, and their title pages specify, "at the little north door of Paul's at the sign of the Gun."

Millington's business was at the lower end of the publishing scale in Elizabethan England; he printed many ballads, including some by Thomas Deloney. In 1595 he published The Norfolk Tragedy, a ballad based on the story of Babes in the Wood. During the mid-1590s Millington was fined three times by his guild, for issuing ballads to which he did not own the rights and similar small offenses.

== Shakespeare ==
He also published playbooks — most notably, of four of Shakespeare's plays:

- The title page of the Q1 of Titus Andronicus of 1594, entered to John Danter in the Stationers' Register on February 6 1594, indicates the book would be sold at Millington and White's shop in St. Paul's Churchyard. In a later Stationers' Register entry of 19 April 1602, after Danter's death, Millington transferred his claim to Titus to Thomas Pavier (who had gained the rights to Henry V two years earlier), along with his rights to the two Henry VI plays. White, however, published further Quartos of Titus in 1600 and 1611, so Millington and White seem both to have made a claim to own the tragedy.
- On 12 March 1594, Millington entered into the Stationers' Register the early alternative version of Shakespeare's Henry VI, Part 2, short-titled The First Part of the Contention Betwixt the Two Famous Houses of York and Lancaster (the full title is much longer). He published the play in quarto later that year. The printing was done by Thomas Creede. He published a second quarto of the play in 1600.
- In 1595, with no Register entry, Millington published the early alternative version of Henry VI, Part 3, called The True Tragedy of Richard Duke of York. The printing was by "P. S." (i.e. Peter Short). The play should not be confused with The True Tragedy of Richard III, a separate work. Millington published a second quarto of the play, along with the one of Henry VI, Part 2 in 1600.
- In 1600, in partnership with stationer John Busby, Millington published the first quarto of Henry V, again printed by Creede. Neither Millington nor Busby had the play entered into the Stationers' Register, though an entry dated 4 August 1600 may cite the play and note it is "to be stayed" -- or the entry may refer rather to Henry IV, Part 2 (the meaning of the 'staying' entry has been much disputed). Another Register entry dated ten days later, on 14 August, transfers the rights to the play to stationer Thomas Pavier, but does not indicate from whom the rights are being transferred.
- Millington published second quartos of both The First Part of the Contention and The True Tragedy in 1600. And he had a link to one other Shakespearean play: the title page of the Q1 of Titus Andronicus of 1594, printed by John Danter, indicates the book would be sold at Millington and White's shop in St. Paul's Churchyard, suggesting they were the publishers. In a Stationers' Register entry of 19 April 1602, Millington transferred his rights to the two Henry VI plays and Titus to Pavier, the same man who gained the rights to Henry V two years earlier.

== End ==
Thomas Millington published Henry Chettle's England's Mourning Garment in 1603, but then disappears from the historical record — as did fellow publisher Andrew Wise in the same year. The major outbreak of bubonic plague in London in 1603 might not have been coincidental; printer Peter Short died in 1603, while publisher William Ponsonby passed on in 1604.
