= Cuthbert Burby =

English bookseller and publisher (died 1607)

Cuthbert Burby (died 1607) was a London bookseller and publisher of the Elizabethan and early Jacobean eras. He is known for publishing a series of significant volumes of English Renaissance drama, including works by William Shakespeare, Robert Greene, John Lyly, and Thomas Nashe.

== Beginnings ==
Burby ("sometimes confused with Cuthbert Burbage," though there is no known connection between the two men) was the son of Edmund Burby, a farmer in Erlsey, Bedfordshire. Cuthbert Burby was apprenticed to the stationer William Wright for eight years as of Christmas 1584, and became a "freeman" (full member) of the Stationers Company on 13 January 1592. He did business in London between 1592 and 1607. As his title pages attest, his shops were located 1) "under Saint Mildred's Church in the Poultry," 2) "at the Royal Exchange," and 3) "in Paul's Churchyard at the sign of the Swan." He had "a large, flourishing, respectable business...."

Early in his career as a publisher, Burby issued works in the famous controversy between Thomas Nashe and Gabriel Harvey. Curiously, Burby published works in their exchange by both Nashe and Harvey; his connection, it appears, was not personal or ideological – just business. He also published Nashe's The Unfortunate Traveller (1594) and Lenten Stuff (1599).

== Shakespeare ==
Regarding Shakespeare: Burby published two key editions of Shakespearean works, the first quarto of Love's Labor's Lost (1598; printed by William White) and the second quarto of Romeo and Juliet (1599; printed by Thomas Creede). The title page of the R&J Q2 states that that edition was "Newly corrected, augmented, and amended" – which has been interpreted to indicate that Q2 was issued as a deliberate correction and replacement for the defective Q1, the "bad quarto" printed by John Danter in 1597. The title page of Burby's Q1 of LLL, the earliest play text to be printed under Shakespeare's name, also claims that that edition was "Newly corrected and augmented" – which has been taken by some commentators as a possible indication of an earlier "bad quarto" of LLL that has not survived.

Burby had subsidiary connections with the Shakespeare canon as well. He published Palladis Tamia (1598) by Francis Meres, which contains an important reference to Shakespeare and a list of Shakespearean works produced up to 1598. Burby also published (with no attribution of authorship) the first two quartos of The Taming of a Shrew (Q1, 1594; Q2, 1596), the early alternative version of Shakespeare's The Taming of the Shrew. Also, Burby issued the two early quartos of Edward III (1596, 1599), the one play of the Shakespeare Apocrypha that is most commonly seen as having at least some of Shakespeare's work in it.

== Other drama ==
Burby published a number of other plays, attributed or anonymous, during his career:

- The Cobbler's Prophecy, Robert Wilson (1594)
- George a Greene, or The Pinner of Wakefield (1599)
- A Knack to Know an Honest Man (1596)
- Mother Bombie, John Lyly (1594, 1598)
- Orlando Furioso, Robert Greene (1594, 1599).

Burby's relationship with the texts of Robert Greene is worth noting; in addition to Orlando Furioso, Burby issued Greene's pamphlets The Third and Last Part of Coney-Catching and The Repentance of Robert Greene (both 1592). The play George a Greene has sometimes been attributed to Greene's pen.

Burby often worked with the printers John Danter and Simon Stafford, as with many of the texts listed above.

== Other works ==
Also in 1594, Burby published The Second Report of Doctor Faustus, Containing His Appearances, and the Deeds of Wagner – an anonymous prose work that elaborated the story of the magician, and which was written to capitalise on the success of Marlowe's famous play Doctor Faustus. And he published Thomas Lodge's Wit's Misery and the World's Madness in 1596.

Burby published other books on a range of subjects. He was one of the three publishers who issued Robert Allot's verse anthology England's Parnassus in 1600 (the other two being Nicholas Ling and Thomas Heyes). He published many religious works, as did all the publishers of his era; and he issued some of the multi-volume chivalric romances that were the best-sellers of the age, like The Mirror of Knighthood and Champions of Christendom.

== Post mortem ==
The exact date of Burby's death is not known, though it fell between 24 August and 26 September in 1607. In 1609 Burby's widow assigned his copyrights – mainly of theological works – to the publisher's former apprentice Nicholas Bourne. Bourn had printed no dramatic works in his career, but was a successful publisher of news who worked for many years in partnership with Nathaniel Butter.

The overall quality of Burby's work as a publisher has been variously evaluated. Commentators have complained about the quality of the printing in some of Burby's texts; while Burby was not a printer, it can be asserted that he should have employed better craftsmen. It has even been argued that the printing in the "bad quarto" of Romeo and Juliet, Danter's 1597 Q1, is superior to the printing of the Burby/Creede Q2, the "good" quarto of 1599 – that Q2 "is on the whole less carefully printed than Q1."
