= Henry V (play) =

Play by Shakespeare

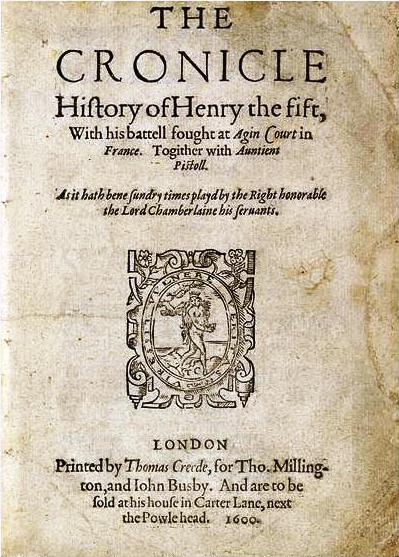
Title page of the first quarto (1600)

The Life of Henry the Fifth, often shortened to Henry V, is a history play by William Shakespeare, believed to have been written circa 1599. It tells the story of King Henry V of England, focusing on events immediately before and after the Battle of Agincourt (1415) during the Hundred Years' War. In the First Quarto text, it was titled The Cronicle History of Henry the fift, and The Life of Henry the Fifth in the First Folio text.

The play is the final part of a tetralogy, preceded by Richard II, Henry IV, Part 1, and Henry IV, Part 2. The original audiences would thus have already been familiar with the title character, whom the Henry IV plays depicted as a wild, undisciplined young man. In Henry V, the young prince has matured. He embarks on an expedition to France and, despite his army being greatly outnumbered, defeats the French at Agincourt.

== Characters ==
- Chorus

The English

- King Henry V
- Duke of Gloucester – Henry's brother
- Duke of Bedford – Henry's brother (Note: Appears in the Folio, but not the Quarto, version of the play. Taylor conjectures that Shakespeare replaced the "cold and distasteful" John of Lancaster, who had appeared in Henry IV, with the "decidedly more likeable Clarence".)
- Duke of Clarence – Henry's brother
- Duke of Exeter – Henry's uncle
- Duke of York – Henry's cousin
- Earl of Salisbury
- Earl of Westmorland
- Earl of Warwick
- Sir Thomas Erpingham
- Capt. Gower – an Englishman
- Capt. Fluellen – a Welshman
- Capt. Macmorris – an Irishman
- Capt. Jamy – a Scot
- John Bates, Alexander Court and Michael Williams – soldiers
- Herald
- Pistol, Nym, and Bardolph – soldiers, former followers of Sir John Falstaff
- Boy – formerly Sir John Falstaff's page
- Mistress Quickly – hostess of the Boar's Head tavern, and Pistol's wife
- Archbishop of Canterbury
- Bishop of Ely

The traitors

- Earl of Cambridge – Henry's cousin
- Lord Scrope
- Sir Thomas Grey

The French

- King of France
- Queen Isabel
- Dauphin of France
- Katharine – their daughter
- Alice – Katharine's lady-in-waiting
- Constable of France
- Duke of Bourbon / Duke of Brittany (depending on the edition of the play)
- Duke of Orléans
- Duke of Berry
- Duke of Burgundy
- Lord Rambures
- Lord Grandpré
- Monsieur le Fer – French soldier
- Montjoy – French herald
- Governor of Harfleur
- French Ambassadors
- Soldiers, servants, attendants, and lords

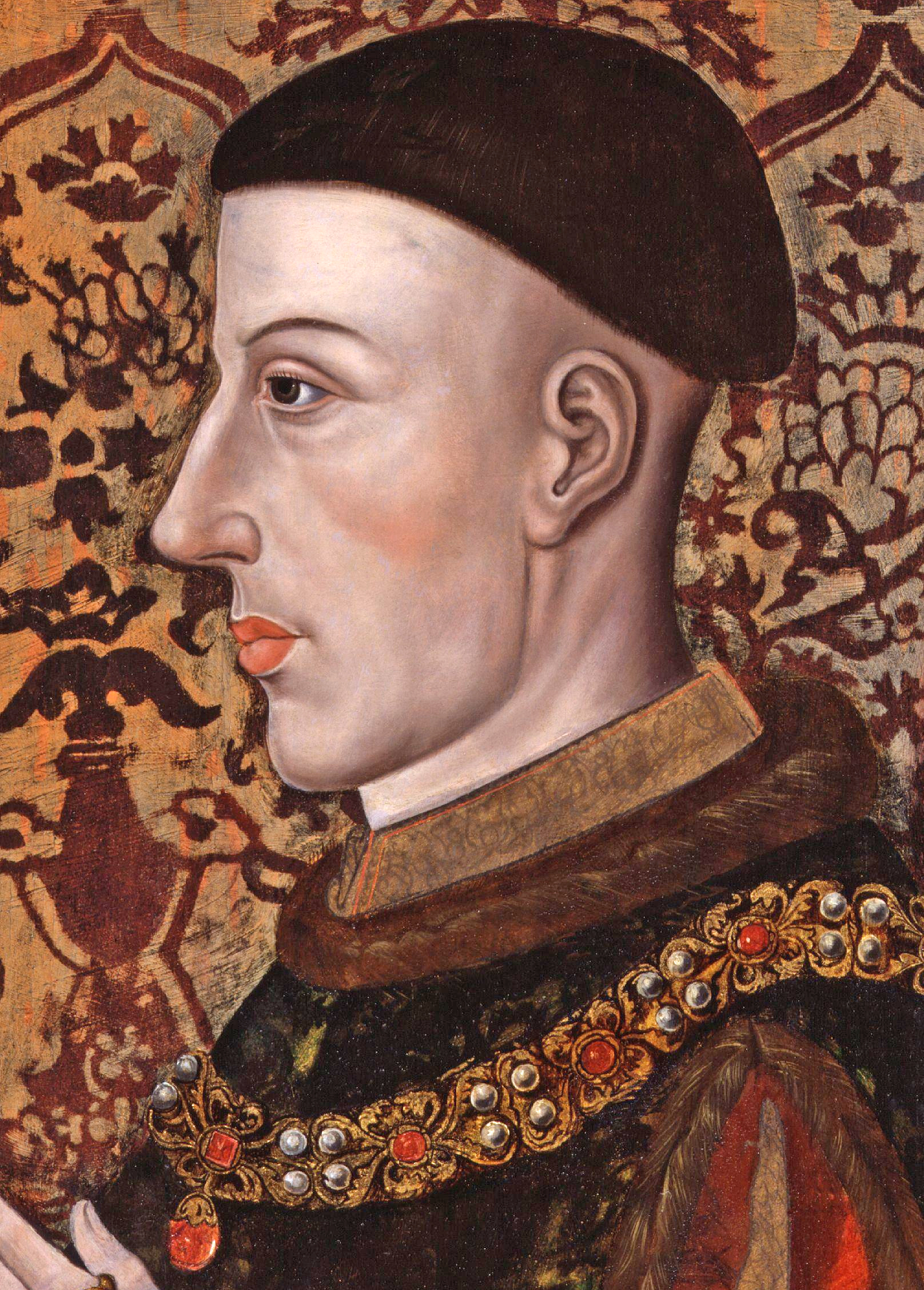
King Henry V

== Synopsis ==
A Chorus (a lone speaker addressing the audience) delivers the Prologue, apologising for the limitations of the theatre and wishing that a muse could inspire the audience's imagination, real royals could be the actors, and the stage could be as large as a kingdom, to do justice to the story of King Henry V (or "Harry"). The Chorus encourages the audience to use their "imaginary forces" to overcome these limitations: "Piece out our imperfections with your thoughts ... turning the accomplishment of many years / Into an hour-glass".

Act I deals largely with Henry and his decision to invade France, persuaded that, through ancestry, he is the rightful heir to the French throne. The French Dauphin, son of King Charles VI, answers Henry's claims with an insulting gift of tennis balls, meant to symbolise Henry's perceived youth and frivolity.

The Chorus reappears at the beginning of each act to advance the story. In Act II, he describes the country's dedication to the war effort: "Now all the youth of England are on fire... / Now thrive the armorers, and honor's thought / Reigns solely in the breast of every man". Act II focuses on a plot by the Earl of Cambridge and two comrades to assassinate Henry at Southampton. Henry's clever uncovering of the plot and his ruthless treatment of the conspirators show that he has changed from the earlier plays in which he appeared.

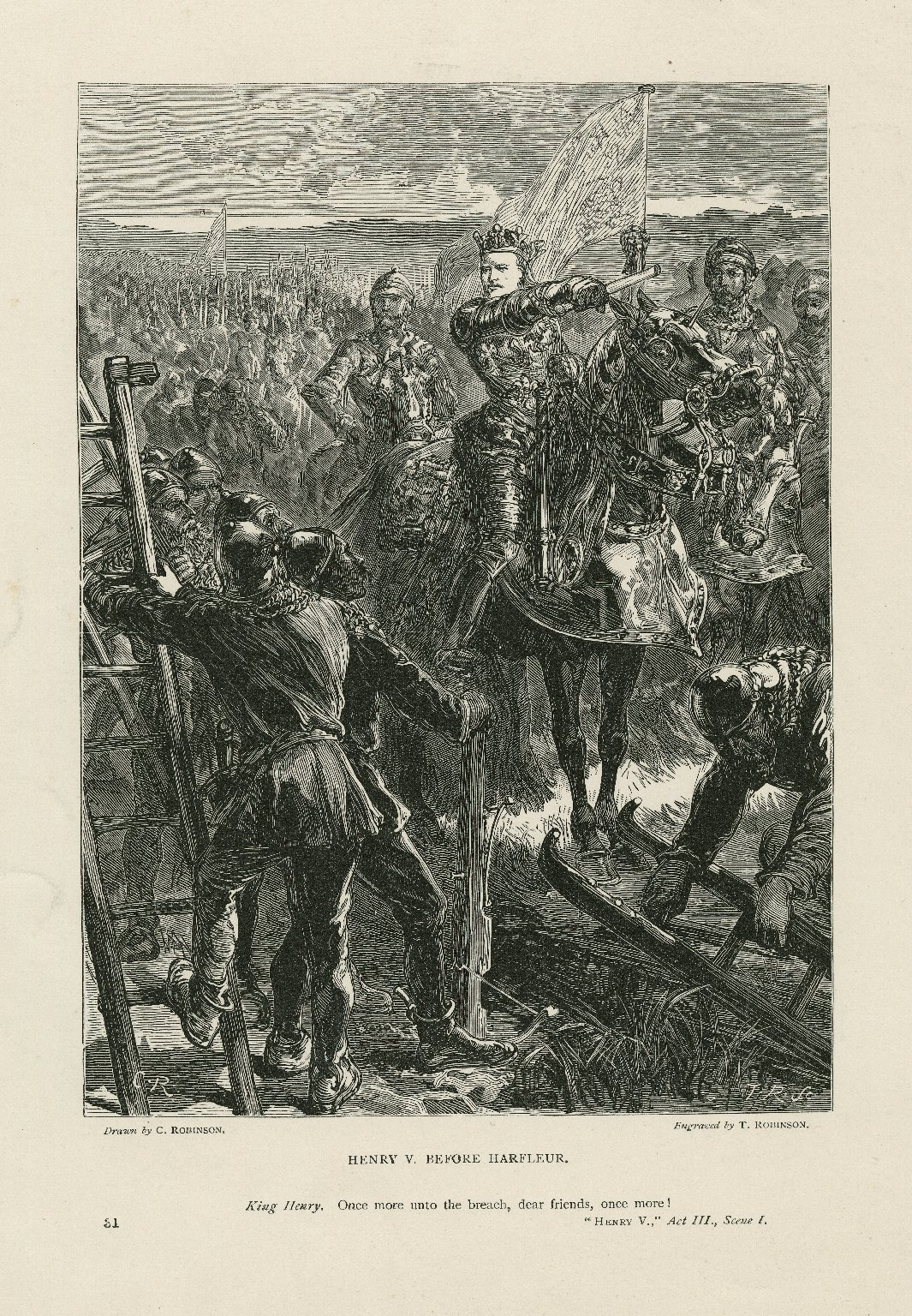
A print of Act III, Scene i: "Once more unto the breach, dear friends!"

In Act III, Henry and his troops besiege the French port of Harfleur after crossing the English Channel. The French king, says the Chorus, "doth offer him / Katharine his daughter, and with her, to dowry, / Some petty and unprofitable dukedoms", but Henry is not satisfied. At the siege of Harfleur, the English are beaten back at first, but Henry urges them on with one of Shakespeare's best-known speeches: "Once more unto the breach, dear friends, once more; / Or close the wall up with our English dead". After a hard-won battle, the English take Harfleur. Montjoy, herald of the French king Charles, delivers a message of Charles's taunts and threats, scorning Henry. Henry tells Montjoy that his forces have been so weakened that he will not yet attack Paris directly, but will instead march up the coast to Calais.

In Act IV, the full power of the French army has surrounded Henry at the small town of Agincourt. The night before the battle, knowing he is outnumbered, Henry wanders around the English camp in disguise, trying to comfort his soldiers and determine what they really think of him. He agonises about the moral burden of being king, asking God to "steel my soldiers' hearts". Daylight comes, and Henry rallies his nobles with the famous St Crispin's Day Speech: "we ... shall be remember'd; / We few, we happy few, we band of brothers". The messenger Montjoy returns to ask if Henry will avoid certain defeat by paying the French a ransom for his men's survival. Henry requests that Montjoy "bear my former answer back", thus refusing to surrender.

Shakespeare does not directly describe the Battle of Agincourt. Though the French in one scene complain that "Tout est perdu" ("all is lost"), the outcome is not clear to Henry until Montjoy reappears and declares that the "day is yours". Henry soon discovers it was a deeply lop-sided victory: the French suffered 10,000 casualties, while the English lost only a Duke, an Earl, a knight, a squire, and "of all other, but five and twenty". (In Laurence Olivier's 1944 film adaptation, this line is modified to "of all other men, but five and twenty score", since historians believe the English toll was approximately 600). Henry praises God for his shocking victory.

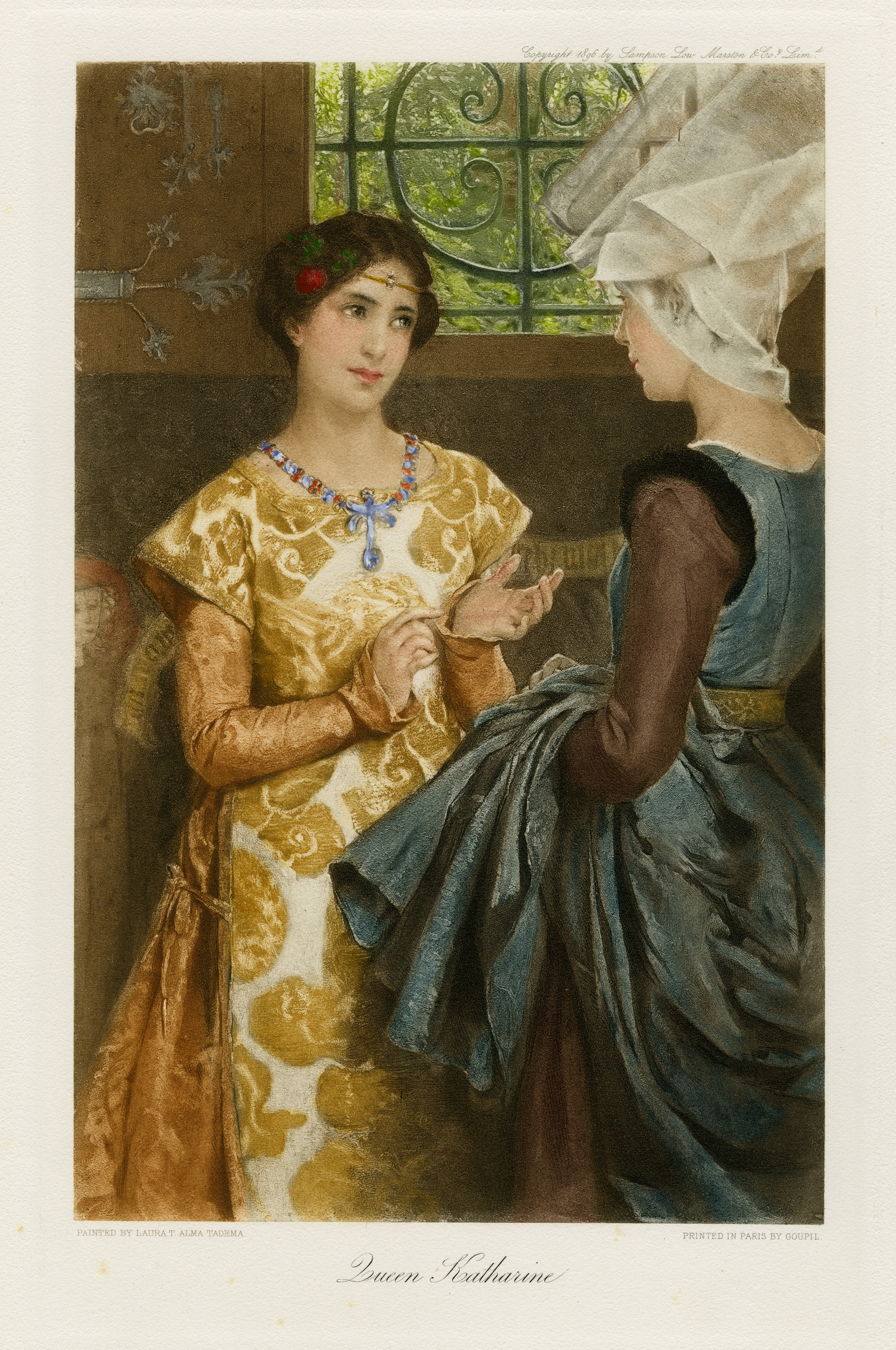
Katharine learns English from her gentlewoman Alice in an 1888 lithograph by Laura Alma-Tadema. Act III, Scene iv.

Act V opens some years later, when the war comes to a brief interval of peace, as the English and French negotiate the Treaty of Troyes, and Henry tries to woo the French princess, Katharine. Neither Henry nor Katharine speaks the other's language well, but the humour of their mistakes actually helps Henry achieve his aim. The scene ends with the French king adopting Henry as heir to the throne of France, and the prayer for unity of the French queen "that English may as French, French Englishmen, receive each other."

The play concludes with the Chorus foreshadowing Henry's death (within two years) and the tumultuous reign of his son Henry VI of England, "whose state so many had the managing, that they lost France, and made his England bleed, which oft our stage hath shown". (Shakespeare here is referring to the fact that he had previously staged the trilogy of plays that focus on these later events: Henry VI Part 1, Henry VI Part 2, and Henry VI Part 3.)

=== Subplots ===
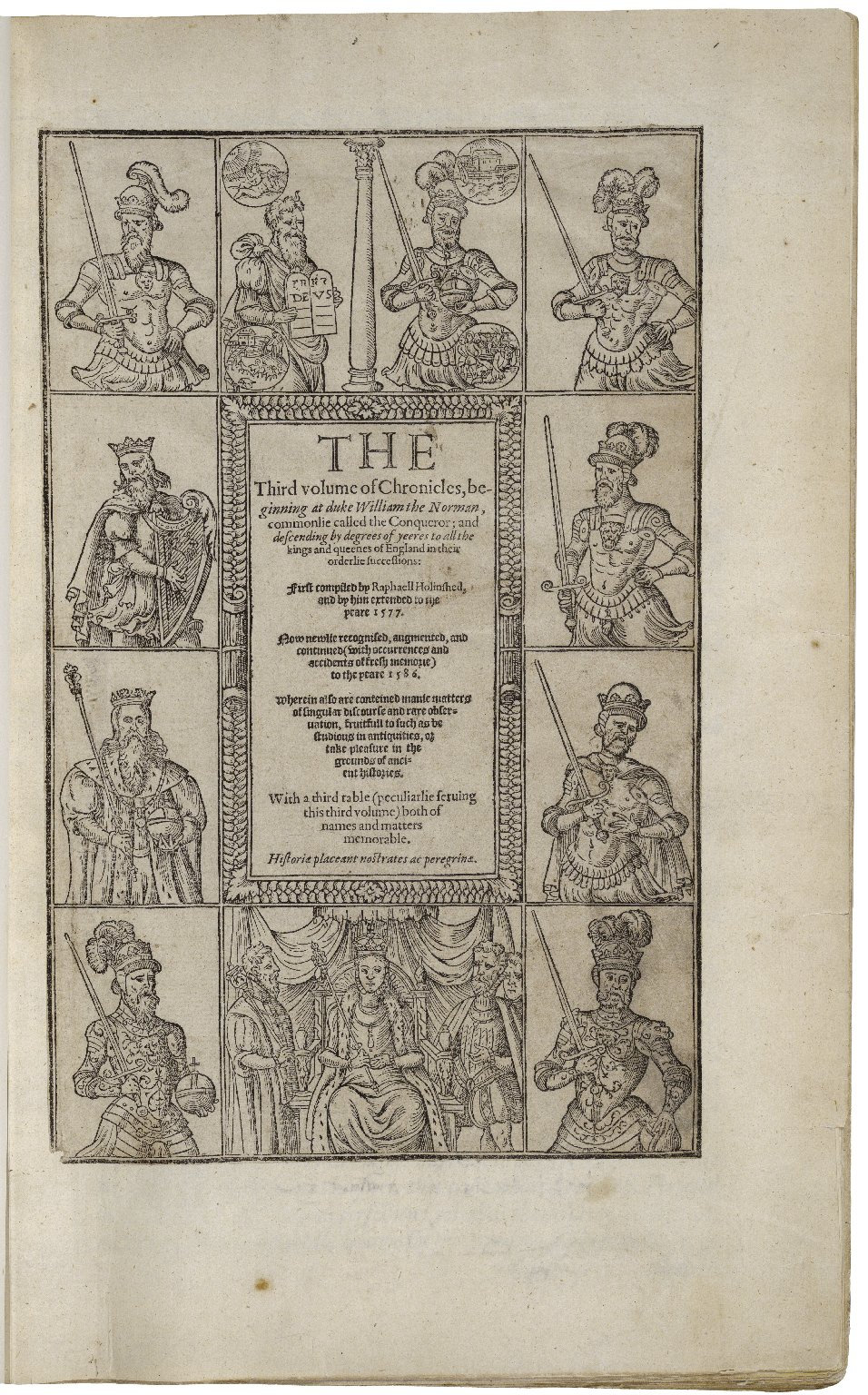
The 1587 edition of Holinshed's Chronicles

As in many of Shakespeare's history and tragedy plays, a number of minor comic characters appear, contrasting with and sometimes commenting on the main plot. In this case, they are mostly common soldiers in Henry's army, and they include Pistol, Nym, and Bardolph from the Henry IV plays. In a grim note, Bardolph is executed for looting. The army also includes a Scot, an Irishman, and an Englishman, and Fluellen, a comically stereotyped Welsh soldier. In one scene of extended French dialogue, Princess Katharine tries to learn some basic English words for body parts from her maid. The play also deals briefly with the death of Sir John Falstaff, Henry's estranged friend from the Henry IV plays, whom Henry had rejected at the end of Henry IV, Part 2.

== Sources ==
Shakespeare's primary source for Henry V, as for most of his chronicle histories, was Raphael Holinshed's Chronicles; the publication of the second edition in 1587 provides a terminus post quem for the play. Edward Hall's The Union of the Two Illustrious Families of Lancaster and York appears also to have been consulted, and scholars have supposed that Shakespeare was familiar with Samuel Daniel's poem on the civil wars. An earlier play, The Famous Victories of Henry V is also generally believed to have been a model for the work.

== Date and text ==
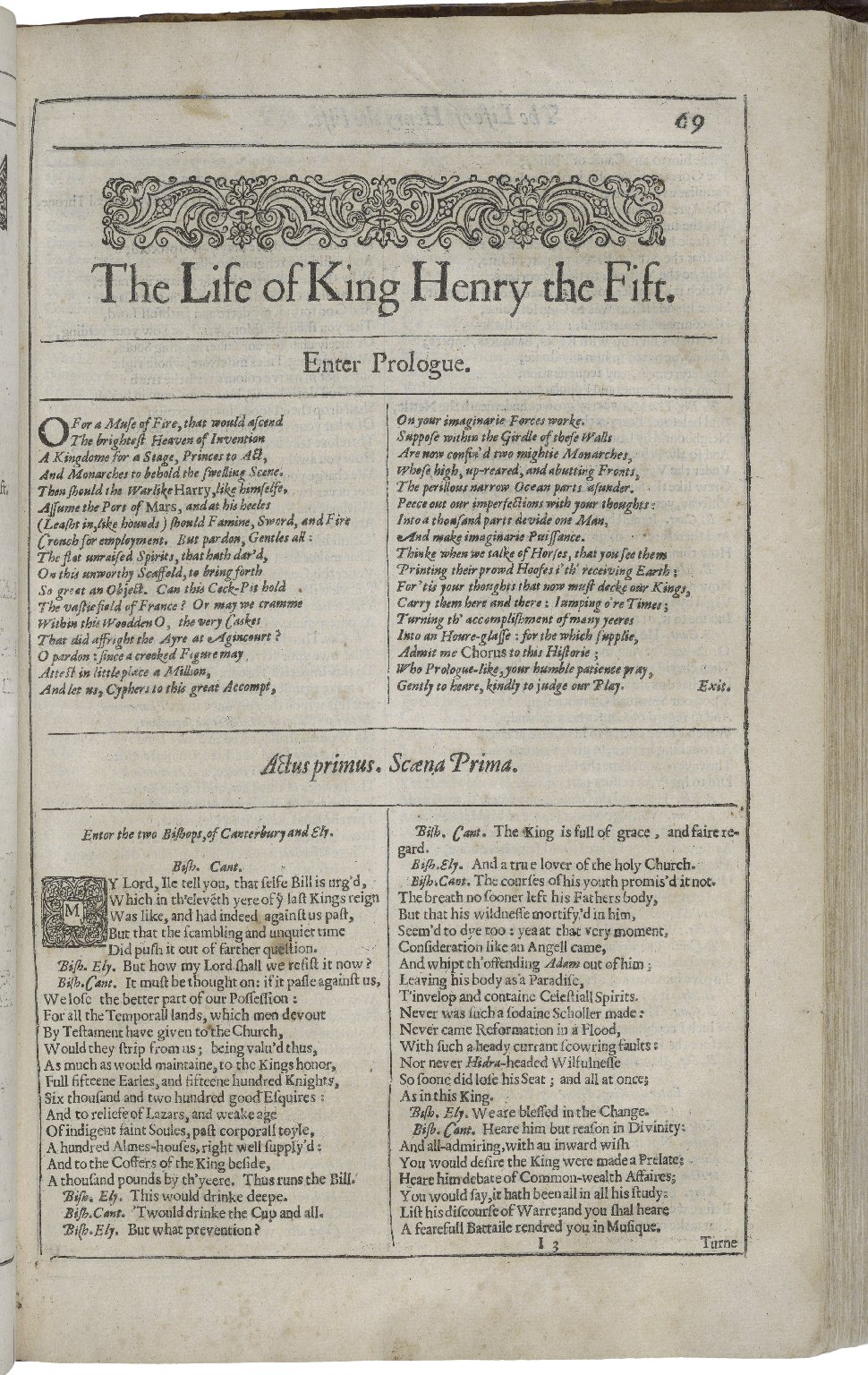
The first page of The Life of King Henry the Fifth, printed in the Second Folio edition of 1632

On the basis of an apparent allusion to the Earl of Essex's mission to quell Tyrone's Rebellion, the play is thought to date from early 1599. The Chronicle History of Henry the fifth was entered into the Register of the Stationers Company on 14 August 1600 by the bookseller Thomas Pavier; the first quarto was published before the end of the year—though by Thomas Millington and John Busby rather than Pavier. Thomas Creede did the printing.

Q1 of Henry V is a "bad quarto", a shortened version of the play that might be an infringing copy or reported text. A second quarto, a reprint of Q1, was published in 1602 by Pavier; another reprint was issued as Q3 in 1619, with a false date of 1608—part of William Jaggard's False Folio. The superior text was first printed in the First Folio in 1623.

== Criticism and analysis ==
=== Views on warfare ===
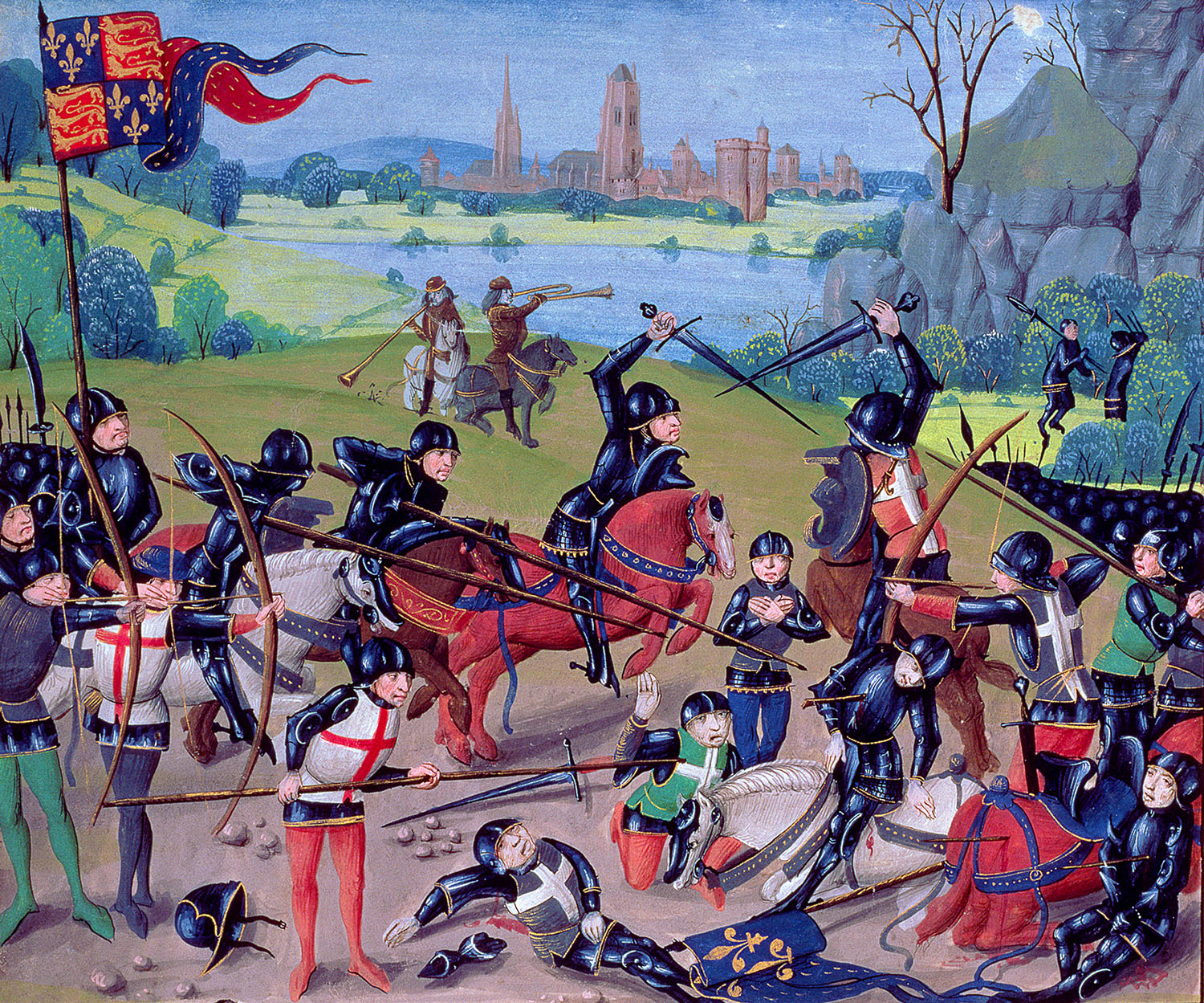
The Battle of Agincourt depicted in a contemporary miniature, from the St. Alban's Chronicle by Thomas Walsingham.

Readers and audiences have interpreted the play's attitude to warfare in several ways. It seems to celebrate Henry's invasion of France and his military prowess, but it can also be read as a commentary on the moral and personal cost of war. Gathered, Shakespeare presents warfare in all its complexity.

The American critic Norman Rabkin described the play as a picture with two meanings. He argues that the play never settles on one viewpoint on war, Henry himself changing his descriptions frequently, talking of "rape and pillage" during Harfleur, but of patriotic glory in his St Crispin's Day Speech.

Some scholars have connected the nationalist glorification of war with contemporary military ventures in Spain and Ireland. The Chorus directly refers to the looked-for military triumphs of the Earl of Essex, in the fifth act. Henry V himself is sometimes seen as an ambivalent representation of the stage machiavel, combining apparent sincerity with a willingness to use deceit and force to attain his ends.

Other commentators see the play as looking critically at the reason for Henry's actions. The noble words of the Chorus and Henry are consistently undermined by Pistol, Bardolph, and Nym. Pistol talks in a bombastic blank verse that seems to parody Henry's own style of speech. Pistol and his friends, thus, show up the actions of their rulers. Indeed, the presence of the Eastcheap characters from Henry IV has been said to emphasise the element of adventurer in Henry's character as monarch.

The play's ambiguity has led to diverse interpretations in performance. Laurence Olivier's 1944 film, made during the Second World War, emphasises the patriotic side, ignoring the fact that the enemy of the play, the French, were allies in that conflict, (Note: Olivier's movie paradoxically attempts to create patriotic fervour in a war against Germany where the French were Britain's allies by celebrating a past heroic English victory over those very allies.) while Kenneth Branagh's 1989 film stresses the horrors of war. A 2003 Royal National Theatre production featured Henry as a modern war general, ridiculing the Iraq invasion.

In recent years, there has been scholarly debate about whether or not Henry V can be labeled a war criminal. Some call the question anachronistic, arguing that current legal standards cannot be applied to historical events or figures. However, other scholars have supported the proposed viewpoint. For instance, Christopher N. Warren looks to Alberico Gentili's De armis Romanis, along with Henry V itself, to show how early modern thinkers (including Shakespeare) were themselves using juridical approaches to engage with the past. As a result, Warren argues, the question of whether Henry V was a war criminal is not only legitimate, but also "historically appropriate".

In rhetoric intended to intimidate the Governor of Harfleur into surrendering the city to the English, Henry denies personal responsibility for his soldiers' actions if battle is resumed – "What rein can hold licentious wickedness / When down the hill he holds his fierce career?" – and describes in graphic detail the violence they will do to the townsfolk if his demands are not met:

The gates of mercy shall be all shut up,
And the flesh'd soldier, rough and hard of heart,
In liberty of bloody hand shall range
With conscience wide as hell, mowing like grass
Your fresh, fair virgins and your flowering infants.

— Act III, Scene iii.

On the other hand, Henry is portrayed as a great leader, as he keeps his temper when insulted: "we are glad the Dauphin is so pleasant with us". He also admits to his past mistakes: "did give ourselves to barbarous licence" and is shown to have great confidence: "I will rise there with so full a glory that I will dazzle all the eyes of France".

A mock trial of the crimes associated with the legality of the invasion and the slaughter of prisoners was held in Washington, DC in March 2010, drawing from both historical record and Shakespeare's play. Titled The Supreme Court of the Amalgamated Kingdom of England and France, participating judges were Justices Samuel Alito and Ruth Bader Ginsburg. The outcome was originally to be determined by an audience vote, but due to a draw, it came down to a judges' decision. The court was divided on Henry's justification for war, but unanimously found him guilty on the killing of the prisoners after applying "the evolving standards of the maturing society". Previously, the fictional Global War Crimes Tribunal ruled that Henry's war was legal, no noncombatant was killed unlawfully, and Henry bore no criminal responsibility for the death of the POWs. The fictional French Civil Liberties Union, who had instigated the tribunal, then attempted to sue in civil court. The judge concluded that he was bound by the GWCT's conclusions of law and also ruled in favour of the English. The Court of Appeals affirmed without opinion, thus leaving the matter for the Supreme Court's determination.

=== National identity ===
The words England, English, and Englishmen are used more frequently in Henry V than in any other play by Shakespeare. According to Michael Neill, this reflects the play's "deep involvement in that process of national self-definition which saw the emergence of England as Europe's first true nation-state." While the Chorus refers to the expectation of natural allegiance to one's native country, the play highlights the contradictions within the idea of "foreign" and "native" and within English identity itself. The English troops are shown to be a combination of Scottish, Irish, Welsh and English soldiers, whose relations are not always friendly. In Neill's view, the characters Fluellen and Macmorris represent different aspects of the possibility of incorporation into the English nation. Fluellen is hailed by Henry as a fellow countryman (since Henry himself was born in Wales) and proves himself to be really "English" under his "native garb" in his encounter with Pistol; he reflects the relatively easy absorption of Wales into the English kingdom. Meanwhile, Macmorris's angry response to the mention of the word "nation" may reflect contemporary anxieties about the ongoing conquest of Ireland.

The play is one of the earliest written sources for the leek being a national symbol of Wales, with Fluellen identifying it strongly in Act V, Scene i. The particular Welsh tradition of wearing a leek on Saint David's Day is also attested in Act IV, as well as Welsh soldiers wearing it in battle (Welsh tradition holds that early Welsh soldiers wore it when fighting against Anglo-Saxons).

The issue of national belonging in the play is further complicated by the presence of the French, who are at once contrasted with Henry's subjects and supposed to be integrated with them through Henry's conquest of France. This contradiction is seemingly resolved at the end of the play by Henry's marriage to the French princess Katharine, symbolically uniting the English and the French in the "one flesh" of husband and wife. However, according to Neill, Shakespeare makes clear in multiple scenes, including the dialogue between Henry and Katharine, the violent and involuntary nature of this prospective unification of the two countries.

== Performance history ==
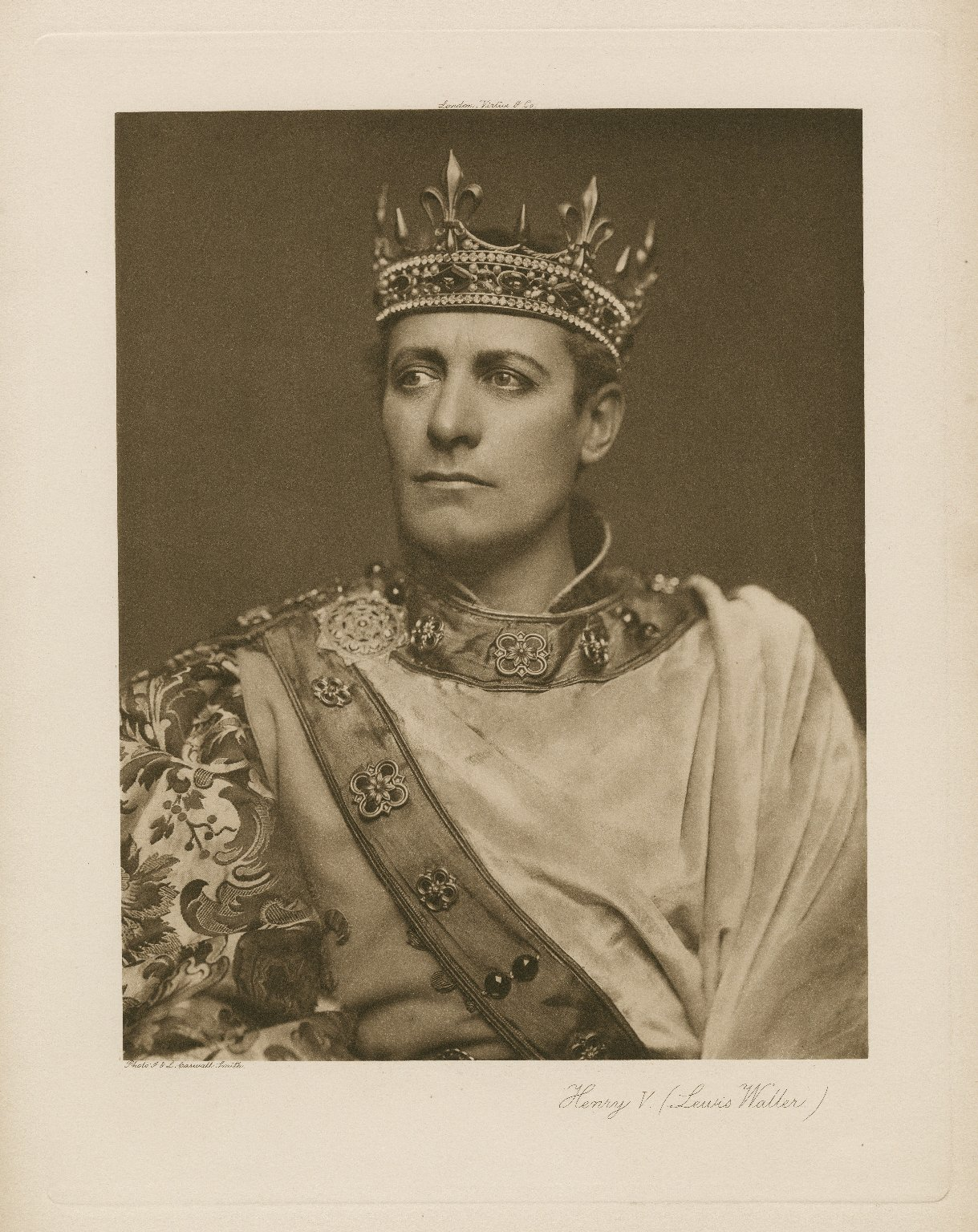
Lewis Waller as Henry V, 1900

The Chorus refers to Essex's 1599 campaign in Ireland without any sense that it would end in disaster. The campaign began in late March and was scuttled by late June, strongly suggesting that the play was first performed during that three-month period.

A tradition, impossible to verify, holds that Henry V was the first play performed at the new Globe Theatre in the spring of 1599—the Globe would have been the "wooden O" mentioned in the Prologue—but Shapiro argues that the Chamberlain's Men were still at The Curtain when the work was first performed, and that Shakespeare himself probably acted the Chorus. In 1600, the first printed text states that the play had been played "sundry times". The earliest performance for which an exact date is known, however, occurred on 7 January 1605, at Court at Whitehall Palace.

Samuel Pepys saw a Henry V in 1664, but it was written by Roger Boyle, 1st Earl of Orrery, not by Shakespeare. Shakespeare's play returned to the stage in 1723, in an adaptation by Aaron Hill.

The longest-running production of the play in Broadway history was the staging starring Richard Mansfield in 1900 which ran for 54 performances. Other notable stage performances of Henry V include Charles Kean (1859), Charles Alexander Calvert (1872), and Walter Hampden (1928).

Major revivals in London during the 20th and 21st centuries include:

- 1900 Lyceum Theatre, Lewis Waller as Henry
- 1914 Shaftesbury Theatre, F. R. Benson as Henry
- 1916 His Majesty's Theatre, Martin Harvey as Henry
- 1920 Strand Theatre, Murray Carrington as Henry
- 1926 Old Vic Theatre, Baliol Holloway as Henry
- 1928 Lyric, Hammersmith, Lewis Casson as Henry (Old Vic Company)
- 1931 Old Vic Theatre, Ralph Richardson as Henry
- 1934 Alhambra Theatre, Godfrey Tearle as Henry
- 1936 Ring, Blackfriars, Hubert Gregg as Henry
- 1937 Old Vic Theatre, Laurence Olivier as Henry
- 1938 Drury Lane Theatre, Ivor Novello as Henry
- 1951 Old Vic Theatre, Alec Clunes as Henry
- 1955 Old Vic Theatre, Richard Burton as Henry
- 1956 Stratford Shakespeare Festival, Christopher Plummer as Henry, with William Shatner as his understudy who substituted for him in one performance
- 1960 Mermaid Theatre, William Peacock as Henry
- 1960 Old Vic Theatre, Donald Houston as Henry
- 1965 Aldwych Theatre, Ian Holm as Henry (Royal Shakespeare Company)
- 1972 Aldwych Theatre, Timothy Dalton as Henry (Prospect Theatre Company), also in 1974 in Roundhouse Theatre
- 1976 Aldwych Theatre, Alan Howard as Henry (Royal Shakespeare Company)
- 1985 Barbican Theatre, Kenneth Branagh as Henry (Royal Shakespeare Company)
- 2003 Royal National Theatre, Adrian Lester as Henry
- 2013 Noël Coward Theatre, Jude Law as Henry (Michael Grandage Company)
- 2015 RSC and The Barbican, Alex Hassell as Henry
- 2022 Donmar Warehouse, Kit Harington as Henry

In the Shakespeare's Globe's 2012 Globe to Globe festival, Henry V was the UK entry, one of 37 and the only one performed in spoken English. Jamie Parker performed the role of Henry.

On British television, the play has been performed as:

- 1951 Clement McCallin as Henry, Marius Goring as Chorus, Willoughby Gray as Pistol
- 1953 Colin George as Henry, Toby Robertson as Chorus, Frank Windsor as Pistol
- 1957 John Neville as Henry, Bernard Hepton as Chorus, Geoffrey Bayldon as Pistol
- 1960 Robert Hardy as Henry, William Squire as Chorus, George A. Cooper as Pistol
- 1979 David Gwillim as Henry, Alec McCowen as Chorus, Bryan Pringle as Pistol, part of the BBC Television Shakespeare series
- 2012 Tom Hiddleston as Henry, John Hurt as Chorus, Paul Ritter as Pistol, part of The Hollow Crown TV series.

In 2017, the Pop-up Globe, the world's first temporary replica of the second Globe Theatre, based in Auckland, New Zealand, performed 34 Henry V shows. London-trained Australian actor Chris Huntly-Turner took on the role of Henry, Irish actor Michael Mahony as Chorus, and UK–New Zealand actor Edward Newborn as Pistol/King of France.

== Adaptations ==
=== Film ===
The first film adaptation, Henry V (1944), directed by and starring Laurence Olivier, is a colourful and highly stylised version which begins in the Globe Theatre and then gradually shifts to a realistic evocation of the Battle of Agincourt. Olivier's film was made during the Second World War and was intended as a patriotic rallying cry at the time of the invasion of Normandy.

The second major film, Henry V (1989), directed by and starring Kenneth Branagh, attempts to give a more realistic evocation of the period, and lays more emphasis on the horrors of war. It features a mud-spattered and gruesome Battle of Agincourt.

There is a 2007 low budget adaptation by Peter Babakitis.

A recent major film, The King (2019), starring Timothée Chalamet as Henry V, was adapted from Shakespeare's plays Henry IV Part I, Henry IV Part II, and Henry V.

=== Television ===
In 2012, the BBC commissioned a television adaptation of the play as part of The Hollow Crown series. It was part of a tetralogy that televised the entirety of Shakespeare's Henriad. Produced by Sam Mendes and directed by Thea Sharrock, it starred Tom Hiddleston as Henry V, who had played Prince Hal in The Hollow Crown's adaptations of Henry IV, Part I and Henry IV, Part II. The BBC scheduled the screening of Shakespeare's history plays as part of the 2012 Cultural Olympiad, a celebration of British culture coinciding with the 2012 Summer Olympics.

=== Dance ===
In 2004, post-modern choreographer David Gordon created a dance-theatre version of the play called Dancing Henry Five, which mixed William Walton's music written for the Olivier film, recorded speeches from the film itself and by Christopher Plummer, and commentary written by Gordon. The piece premiered at Danspace Project in New York, where it was compared favorably to a production of Henry IV (parts 1 and 2) at Lincoln Center. It has been revived three times—in 2005, 2007, and 2011—playing cities across the United States, and received a National Endowment for the Arts American Masterpieces in Dance Award.

=== Music ===
Suite from Henry V is a 1963 orchestral arrangement of music that composer William Walton wrote for the 1944 Olivier film. The arrangement is by Muir Mathieson, and is in five movements.

Henry V – A Shakespeare Scenario is a 50-minute work for narrator, SATB chorus, boys' choir (optional), and full orchestra. The musical content is taken from Walton's score for the Olivier film, edited by David Lloyd-Jones and arranged by Christopher Palmer. It was first performed at the Royal Festival Hall in London, in May 1990. Performers for this premiere were Christopher Plummer (narrator), the Academy Chorus, Choristers of Westminster Cathedral, and Academy of St Martin-in-the-Fields. The conductor was Sir Neville Marriner. A CD of the work with these performers was released by Chandos in 1990.

O For a Muse of Fire is a symphonic overture for full orchestra and vocal soloist, written by Darryl Kubian. The work is 12 minutes long, and was premiered by the New Jersey Symphony Orchestra in March 2015. The work is scored for full orchestra, with vocal soloist. The vocal part incorporates selected lines from the text, and the vocal range is adaptable to different voice types. The soloist for the premiere performances with the New Jersey Symphony was former October Project lead singer (and former Sony Classical artist) Mary Fahl.

== See also ==
- List of idioms attributed to Shakespeare
