= Thomas Lord Cromwell =

Elizabethan history play

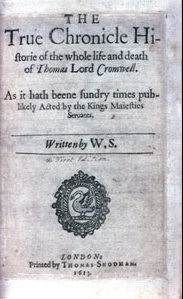
Title page of 1613 printing of Thomas Lord Cromwell.

Thomas Lord Cromwell is an Elizabethan history play, depicting the life of Thomas Cromwell, 1st Earl of Essex, the minister of King Henry VIII of England.

The play was entered into the Stationers' Register on 11 August 1602 by William Cotton and was published in quarto later the same year by bookseller William Jones, for whom it was printed by Richard Read. The title page of Q1 specifies that the play was acted by The Lord Chamberlain's Men, and attributes the play to a "W. S." A second quarto (Q2) was printed in 1613 by Thomas Snodham. The Q2 title page repeats the data of Q1, though the Lord Chamberlain's Men are now the King's Men (the name change having occurred in 1603).

The "W. S." of the quartos was first identified as William Shakespeare when publisher Philip Chetwinde added the play to the second impression of his Shakespeare Third Folio in 1664. Modern scholars reject the Shakespearean attribution; speculation, relying on common initials, has shone on Wentworth Smith and William Sly as possible alternatives. Individual critics have also suggested Thomas Heywood and Michael Drayton as possible authors—suggestions unsupported by firm evidence.

Indeed, scholars have disagreed about almost every aspect of the play; it has been dated as early as 1582–83 and as late as 1599–1600. The play is primarily political commentary—or religious propaganda. Baldwin Maxwell argued that the play has a discontinuous nature: the first half, through Act III scene ii, is dramaturgically well-crafted, while the second half is disorganized and loosely put together. Maxwell interpreted this as indicating that the extant text was the telescoped condensation of a two-part original; alternatively, others have suggested that the play is a collaboration between two unequal partners, or a work that was left incomplete by its original creator and finished by another hand.

== In Performance ==
In 2020, the Beyond Shakespeare Company released online a play-reading and discussion of The Life and Death of Thomas Cromwell.
