= The London Prodigal =

Play sometimes attributed to Shakespeare

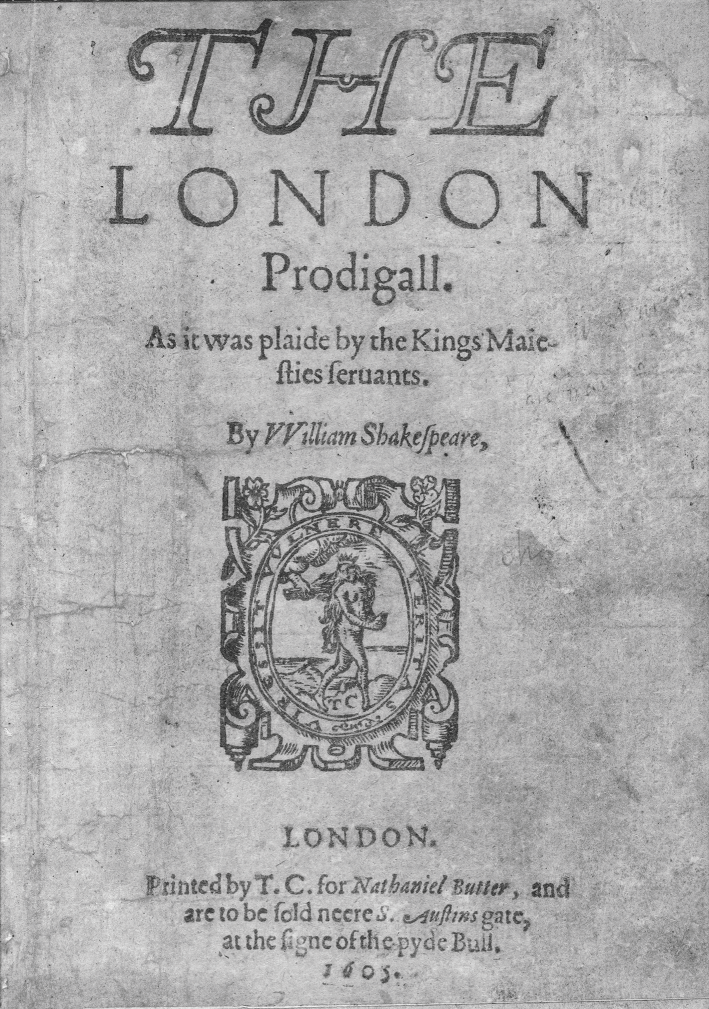
- Title page from first edition
- Original language: English
- Written by: William Shakespeare (attributed), real author debated
- Genre: city comedy
- Setting: London

Premiere
- Date: c. 1591-1604

The London Prodigal is an English Renaissance play, most notable for its inclusion among the Shakespeare apocrypha. A city comedy set in London, it tells the story of a prodigal son learning the error of his ways. It was published 1605 as a play by William Shakespeare but the attribution is regarded as spurious by most scholars.

== Date, authorship and publication ==
The London Prodigal has been dated as early as c. 1591, and as late as 1603–04. It is one of a long series of "prodigal son" plays that reach back as far as the Bible for inspiration and precedent; but it is also an example of the evolving Elizabethan genre of domestic dramas, and is "one of the first naturalistic dramas in English".

The play was not entered into the Stationers' Register. It was published in quarto in 1605 by the stationer Nathaniel Butter, and printed by Thomas Creede. The title states that it is "By William Shakespeare", and that it was performed by the King's Men's, the company for whom Shakespeare worked. The attribution to Shakespeare is generally rejected by scholars as the play does not read like his other work.

It was not included in the 1623 First Folio of Shakespeare's collected plays. However, in 1664 it was one of the seven plays that publisher Philip Chetwinde added to the second impression of his Third Folio of Shakespeare's plays. In modern times, the play has been published in two editions. An old-spelling edition appears in C.F. Tucker-Brooke's The Shakespeare Apocrypha. A modern-spelling edition appears in the 2013 anthology William Shakespeare and Others: Collaborative Plays, whose editors state that it is "almost certainly not by Shakespeare".

Individual scholars have attributed the play to Ben Jonson, Thomas Dekker, John Marston, and Michael Drayton, Thomas Heywood, George Wilkins, and John Fletcher. None of these attributions, however, has been accepted by a significant proportion of the critical community. In 1994, Jonathan Hope proposed, based on linguistic evidence that the play is a collaboration by two authors.

== Synopsis ==
Matthew Flowerdale, the prodigal son of a merchant, Flowerdale Senior, is a libertine, gambler, swearer, brawler, drinker and thief. Flowerdale Senior's brother, Flowerdale Junior, warns him about Matthew's dissolute behaviour but Flowerdale Senior dismisses his fear, believing that "youth must have its course" and that his son will soon make amends. In order to spy on his son, Flowerdale Senior feigns death and appears disguised as a servant. He is soon appalled by the sum of his son's vices. Matthew Flowerdale forges a will in which he pretends to be a wealthy man bequeathing all his fortune to Sir Lancelot Spurcock. When the latter discovers the will, he decides to marry his daughter Luce with Matthew. They are quickly married but Matthew is arrested for debt on his wedding day. He becomes poorer and poorer and robs one of Luce's sisters. Although she is abominably treated by her husband (he even asks her to become a whore), Luce remains loyal to him and finally moves her dissolute husband to repentance and reform. Flowerdale Senior reveals his true identity and congratulates his son for his new resolutions.
