= Sir John Oldcastle =

17th-century play sometimes attributed to William Shakespeare

A scene from R. Thad Taylor's production of Sir John Oldcastle (1986)

Sir John Oldcastle is an Elizabethan play about John Oldcastle, a controversial 14th-/15th-century rebel and Lollard who was seen by some of Shakespeare's contemporaries as a proto-Protestant martyr.

== Publication ==
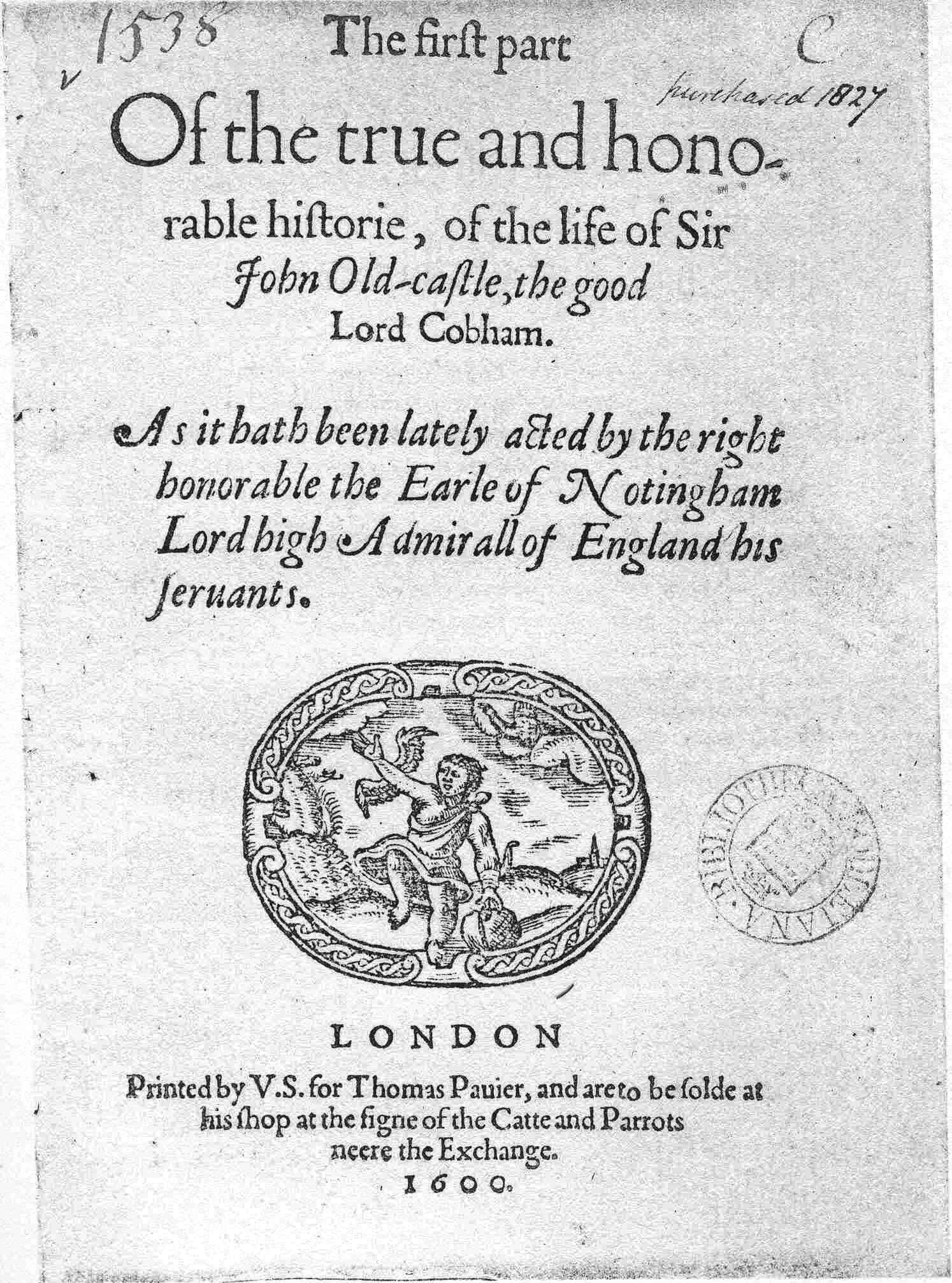
Title page of Sir John Oldcastle Q1 (1600)

The play was originally published anonymously in 1600 (Q1), printed by Valentine Simmes for the bookseller Thomas Pavier. In 1619, a new edition (Q2) carried an attribution to William Shakespeare. The diary of Philip Henslowe records that the play was written by Anthony Munday, Michael Drayton, Richard Hathwaye and Robert Wilson. (An entry in Henslowe's Diary records a later payment to Drayton for a second part to the play, which has not survived; because of this fact, the extant play has sometimes been called Sir John Oldcastle, Part I or 1 Sir John Oldcastle.)

In 1664, the play was one of the seven dramas added to the second impression of the Shakespeare Third Folio by publisher Philip Chetwinde.

== Historical figure ==
Like other subjects of Elizabethan history plays, Sir John Oldcastle was an actual person, a soldier and Lollard dissenter who was hanged and burned for heresy and treason in 1417—thus earning himself a place in the seminal text of the Protestant Reformation in Tudor England, John Foxe's Book of Martyrs. Oldcastle was also a minor character in the early Elizabethan history play the Famous Victories of Henry V (c. 1586?), which is generally thought to have been one of Shakespeare's sources for his plays on Henry IV and Henry V.

== Shakespeare's Oldcastle ==
The genesis of Sir John Oldcastle is crucially linked to the fact that when Shakespeare's Henry IV plays premiered on stage in 1597–98, the character Sir John Falstaff was called Sir John Oldcastle. This is indicated by abundant external and internal evidence. The change of names, from "Oldcastle" to "Falstaff", is mentioned in seventeenth-century works by Richard James (Epistle to Sir Harry Bourchier, c. 1625) and Thomas Fuller (Worthies of England, 1662). It is also indicated in details in the early texts of Shakespeare's plays. In the quarto text of Henry IV, Part 2 (1600), one of Falstaff's speech prefixes in Act I, Scene ii is mistakenly left uncorrected, "Old." instead of "Falst." In III, ii,25–26 of the same play, Falstaff is said to have been a "page to Thomas Mowbray, Duke of Norfolk"—which was true of the historical Oldcastle. In Henry IV, Part 1, I, ii, 42, Prince Hal calls Falstaff "my old lad of the castle". Iambic pentameter verse lines in both parts are irregular when using the name "Falstaff", but correct with "Oldcastle". Finally, there is the blatant disclaimer at the close of Henry IV, Part 2 that disassociates the two figures: "for Oldcastle died [a] martyr, and this is not the man" (Epilogue, 29–32).

There is even a hint that Falstaff was originally Oldcastle in The Merry Wives of Windsor too. When the First Folio and quarto texts of that play are compared, it appears that the joke in V,v,85–90 is that Oldcastle/Falstaff incriminates himself by calling out the first letter of his name, "O, O, O!," when his fingertips are singed with candles—which of course works for "Oldcastle" but not "Falstaff." There is also the "castle" reference in IV,v,6 of the same play. The name Falstaff was derived from Sir John Fastolf, who was also a historical person—allegedly a greedy and grasping individual, who had a (probably undeserved) reputation for cowardice at the Battle of Patay in 1429. Fastolf, however, died without descendants, making him safe for a playwright's use. He had already appeared as a cowardly knight in Henry VI, part 1.

== The Lords Cobham ==
The name change and the Epilogue disclaimer were required, it is generally thought, because of political pressure: the historical Oldcastle was not only a Protestant martyr, but a nobleman with powerful living descendants in Elizabethan England. These were the Lords Cobham: William Brooke, 10th Baron Cobham (died 6 March 1597), was Warden of the Cinque Ports (1558–97), Knight of the Order of the Garter (1584), and member of the Privy Council (1586–97); his son Henry Brooke, 11th Baron Cobham, was granted the paternal post of Warden of the Cinque Ports upon his father's death, and made a Knight of the Order of the Garter in 1599. Even more so, Frances Brooke, the 10th Baron's wife and 11th Baron's mother, was a close personal favorite of Her Majesty Queen Elizabeth I (an Elizabethan could not have been more or better connected than the Cobhams).

The elder Lord Cobham even had a strong negative impact upon the lives of Shakespeare and his contemporaries in the theater. The company of actors formed by Shakespeare, Richard Burbage, Will Kempe and the others in 1594 enjoyed the patronage of Henry Carey, first Lord Hunsdon, then serving as Lord Chamberlain; they were, famously, the Lord Chamberlain's Men. When Carey died on 22 July 1596, the post of Lord Chamberlain was given to William Brooke, Lord Cobham, who definitely was not a friend to the players, and who withdrew what official protection they had enjoyed. The players were left to the mercies of the local officials of the City of London, who had long wanted to drive the companies of actors out of the City. Thomas Nashe, in a contemporary letter, complained that the actors were "piteously persecuted by the Lord Mayor and the aldermen" during this period. This did not last; when Cobham died less than a year later, the post of Lord Chamberlain went to Henry Carey's son George, second Lord Hunsdon, and the actors regained their previous patronage.

Soon after the premier of Shakespeare's Oldcastle/Falstaff in 1597–98, literary and dramatic works began to appear that defended the reputation of the historical Oldcastle; scholars argue that the muse that inspired these works was Henry Brooke, 11th Baron Cobham. In 1601 a narrative poem, The Mirror of Martyrs, by one John Weever, was published; it praises Oldcastle as a "valiant captain and most godly martyr." And two years earlier, in 1599, the play Sir John Oldcastle was performed by the Admiral's Men, the main theatrical rivals of Shakespeare's company. This effort to redeem the Oldcastle name was at best only partially successful; allusions to the Falstaff character under the name of Oldcastle continued to appear in succeeding years—in Nathan Field's play Amends for Ladies (1618) and in the anonymous pamphlets The Meeting of Gallants at an Ordinary (1604) and The Wandering Jew (c. 1628), among other works.

== Politics ==
Sir John Oldcastle treats its subject matter in ways acceptable to the values and biases of its audience, and the interests of Elizabethan officialdom (inevitably; if it did anything else it would never have escaped censorship). Oldcastle is a religious but not a political dissenter; his quarrel is with the Roman Catholic Church, and he remains loyal to the Crown and to Henry V personally (II, iii). The villain of the piece is the Bishop of Rochester, aided by his summoner Clun. The same cast of rebels and conspirators is active in this play (II, ii, III, ii, etc.) as in Henry V, but Oldcastle keeps scrupulously separate from them. The play offers a comic character, Sir John of Wrotham, a pale imitation of Falstaff, who interacts with a disguised Henry V (III, iv) much as in Shakespeare's plays. The later scenes are devoted to Rochester's pursuit of Oldcastle and his wife, and their escapes; the play ends on a temporary positive note, with the Oldcastles evading imprisonment. (Presumably, the lost second half of the play would have had the inevitable grimmer ending of Oldcastle's grisly death.)
