= William Jaggard =

English printer and publisher (c. 1568–1623)

- Born: c. 1568; England
- Died: November 1623 (aged 54–55); England
- Occupations: Printer, publisher

William Jaggard (c. 1568 – November 1623) was an Elizabethan and Jacobean printer and publisher, best known for his connection with the texts of William Shakespeare, most notably the First Folio of Shakespeare's plays. Jaggard's shop was "at the sign of the Half-Eagle and Key in Barbican."

== Life and work ==
He was the son of a John Jaggard, a citizen of London and a barber-surgeon by profession; the elder Jaggard was already deceased when his son began an eight-year apprenticeship with printer Henry Denham at Michaelmas (29 September) 1584. William Jaggard became a "freeman" (a full member) of the Stationers Company on 6 December 1591.

In time, Jaggard developed one of the largest print shops of his generation; he was eventually assisted by his son Isaac (died 1627), who succeeded to his father's business in 1623. In their era, most members of the stationers guild were either printers or booksellers; both were businessmen with their own establishments, journeymen and apprentices, though in anachronistic modern terms printers could be regarded as blue-collar while the booksellers were white-collar retailers. Most commercial publishing was done by booksellers, who chose their books and commissioned printers to print them. The distinction, while generally valid, was not absolute; some successful printers, like Richard Field, published a significant minority of the works they printed. The Jaggards too did a significant amount of publishing as well as printing; in the most obvious case, they not only printed the First Folio but were partners in its publication with bookseller Edward Blount. Printers who published often needed a retail outlet for their wares; Jaggard's books were frequently sold by Matthew Lownes at his shop in St. Paul's Churchyard, the centre of the book trade in London.

Jaggard in time rose to a prominent position in his profession; he became the official Printer to the City of London in 1611. When the Stationers Company decided to issue a general catalogue of English books published in 1618–19, Jaggard was chosen as its printer. William Jaggard's brother John Jaggard was also a printer and publisher, and held the rights to print the Essays of Sir Francis Bacon. John published editions of the Essays (1606, 1612, 1613) that were printed by his brother William.

William Jaggard printed a wide variety of common materials, including ballads – one example being Adam Bell, Clym of the Clough, and William of Cloudesle (1610). He also printed books of varying types, including works by Richard Barnfield and John Davies of Hereford. To modern book collectors and bibliophiles, Jaggard is known as the printer and publisher of Edward Topsell's The History of Four-Footed Beasts (1607) and The History of Serpents (1608), famous for their lush and often-reproduced illustrations. The Topsell books can serve to correct a misapprehension about Jaggard's work: from the number of typographical errors and cruxes in the First Folio, it is sometimes inferred that Jaggard did poor-quality work. The Topsell volumes show another side of Jaggard's professional accomplishment; his firm was capable of high-quality craftmanship.

== Shakespeare ==
In 1608 Jaggard bought out the business of the elderly James Roberts, a printer with significant connections to the Shakespeare canon. Roberts printed the second quarto of Titus Andronicus for bookseller Edward White and the first quarto of Merchant of Venice for Thomas Heyes (both 1600); he printed the second quarto of Hamlet for Nicholas Ling in 1604. Roberts also owned the concession to print the handbills that the actors' companies used to advertise their productions. Jaggard sought the same monopoly; he did not obtain it, however, until 1615.

Jaggard had a twenty-year involvement with works of the Shakespeare canon, starting with his publication of the questionable collection The Passionate Pilgrim under Shakespeare's name in 1599. Jaggard printed an expanded edition of the same work in 1612. In 1619 Jaggard was at the center of the cryptic False Folio affair; and in the period 1621–23 his print shop was occupied on the massive task of bringing the First Folio into print.

Given his apparently less-than-respectable links with The Passionate Pilgrim and the False Folio, commentators have wondered why John Heminges and Henry Condell, the two members of the King's Men who compiled the texts of the First Folio, chose Jaggard for the First Folio job. Some scholars have argued that it may have been a matter of necessity; Jaggard's shop had the capacity for a project of such a scale.

== End ==
William Jaggard suffered deteriorating health in the final decade of his life. By the time of the First Folio he was old, infirm and blind; the actual work on the Folio must have been done by his son Isaac. The elder Jaggard died in November 1623, just before the Folio's publication.

A balanced judgement on Jaggard is hard to achieve. In one view, "William Jaggard was in general a reputable printer and it was only when he was dealing with Shakespeare's work that he became at all unethical...." Harsher verdicts have also been rendered.

A descendant of William's brother co-printer John Jaggard, known as Captain William Jaggard (1867–1947), set up a printing and bookselling establishment in Stratford-upon-Avon in 1909 – the Shakespeare Press, 4 Sheep Street. The bibliophilic later Jaggard was responsible for the massive Shakespeare Bibliography (1911). Captain William Jaggard described how after Lady Umfreville, "the line became extinct".
