= Fratricide Punished =

German play on Hamlet

Fratricide Punished, or The Tragedy of Fratricide Punished: or Prince Hamlet of Denmark, is the English name of a German-language play of anonymous origins and disputed age. Because of similarities of plot and dramatis personae, it is considered to be a German variant of the English play Hamlet, though possibly not William Shakespeare's Hamlet, and is a problematic figure in discussions of Hamlet Q1 and the so-called Ur-Hamlet. Such discussions have helped to raise interest in the text, which primarily lived in obscurity before the discovery of Q1 in 1823. Fratricide Punished was first published in German from a written manuscript in 1781 and translated to English by Georgina Archer in 1865. Though the play is readily available online both in English and in German, the manuscript has been lost since its initial publication, and all subsequent editions of the text are, as such, at a remove from the original. Fratricide Punished is often referred to by its German title Der Bestrafte Brudermord, or Tragoedia der bestrafte Bruder-mord oder: Prinz Hamlet aus Dännemark.

== Summary ==
=== Characters ===
- Hamlet – Prince of Denmark and nephew to the King
- King – King of Denmark and uncle of Hamlet
- Queen – Queen of Denmark and mother of Hamlet
- Corambus – Lord Chamberlain
- Opheilia – Corambus' daughter
- Leonhard – Son of Corambus
- Horatio – Friend of Hamlet and member of the watch
- Francisco – Member of the watch
- Ghost of Hamlet's father
- Charles – Leader of the acting troupe
- Phantasmo – Assistant to the King
- Jens – A clown
- Night – Character in Prologue
- Alecto – Servant of Night
- Mägera – Servant of Night
- Thisiphone – Servant of Night
- Ruffian 1 – Assassin hired by King
- Ruffian 2 – Assassin hired by King
- Sentinel 1
- Sentinel 2
- Attendants to the King and Queen
- High German actors

=== Plot ===
Fratricide Punished is a play of five acts, each containing a minimum of six and as many as eleven scenes. While this may suggest a longer play, some scenes are quite scant. For instance, act three, scene seven contains just two sentences of dialogue from a single character. The play as published by Internet Shakespeare Editions runs approximately 545 lines. It contains minimal stage direction, restricting itself to character entrances, musical descriptions, and descriptors of physical action. The plot runs largely along the lines of the familiar Shakespearean Hamlet, but it differs on occasion both in its events and the order of those events, and is notable for its elements of comedic farce, which have been emphasized in various productions.

The play begins with an induction, wherein Night, personified as a wicked, trickster-like figure, calls forth three "furies", Alecto, Mägera, and Thisiphone, to assist her. She informs them that the new King of the land yearns for his sister-in-law and has murdered his brother—the previous king—so that he might have her. Night wishes to cloud both their judgements to aid in their incestuous relationship but also to sow discord and jealousy into their marriage. She also intends to raise up a desire for revenge in those loyal to the slain king. Alecto, Mägera, and Thisiphone agree to assist her. The play ends with an admonishment to those who would seek power through foul play to reconsider, as they will likely be repaid by similar means.

The remainder of Fratricide Punished seems at once familiar to readers of Hamlet, yet at times strange. There are some important differences in the naming of characters. Perhaps the most noteworthy of these is Corambus, a name familiar in Q1 Hamlet but changed to Polonius in Q2 and the folio editions of Shakespeare's text. Corambus' son, Leonhard, is similarly named Laertes in those texts. Rosencrantz and Guildenstern are noticeably absent, their roles replaced in part by unnamed Ruffians. The text also creates the character of Phantasmo to undertake a variety of roles, often comically.

Other notable differences include the lack of Hamlet's "to be or not to be" soliloquy, among others, and Ophelia's decision to commit suicide by jumping down a hill. One of the more "slapstick" differences comes when the Prince has been sent to England, accompanied by his would-be assassins. He foils their attempt on his life by having them stand on either side of him. At the moment the assassins shoot, Hamlet falls to the ground with the result that they shoot one another instead of him.

Similarities and differences between Fratricide Punished, Q1 Hamlet, and the second quarto and folio editions of Hamlet are a powerful point of discussion in academic discussions.

== History ==
Surprisingly little is known about the history of Fratricide Punished prior to its publication, and there is little academic consensus about its early origins. The German editor H.A.O. Reichard, who first published excerpts from the manuscript in his Theater-Kalender auf das Jahr 1779 and went on to publish the work in its entirety in 1781 in his journal Olla Potrida, confirms only that the original bore the text "Pretz, den 27. Oktober 1710" (Pretz, October 27, 1710). Later, Nino Amico, referencing work by University of Catania professor Ingrid Hiller, claimed that the manuscript of Fratricide Punished was of a small format and some thirteen pages. Hiller's research, however, appears not to have been published and others have been unable to corroborate this elsewhere, such that even these scant details remain unconfirmable.

While the date of October 27, 1710 clearly places the manuscript in time, if not necessarily the time it was written, the location of Pretz remains disputed. It is known from the original publication by Reichard that he obtained the manuscript of Fratricide Punished from Konrad Ekhof, a theater manager and historian, who had recently died. Ekhof's father-in-law had started a theater company in the town of Preetz, a location in Plön, Schleswig-Holstein, Germany, in 1710. This has led Oxford professor Tiffany Stern to assert that the "Pretz" annotation on the manuscript most likely refers to Preetz, intuiting that Ekhof must have received the text from his father-in-law. Amico, however, places the text at Kloster Preetz, a nunnery. Still others have argued that "Pretz" refers to either the towns of Graz, Austria or Pretzsch, Germany. Whatever answers the manuscript might have provided to these questions were lost when the manuscript itself was lost, at least as early as 1888.

With regard to the date of its writing, many scholars believe Fratricide Punished to be a manuscript developed over years of English performances in Germany beginning as early as 1586. Kareen Klein, building off a sizable scholarly tradition, traces the lineage from the late sixteenth and early seventeenth centuries, where troupes of English comedians, forced abroad by closed theaters at home, began touring continental Europe. They brought with them an expanded understanding of acting that included such fields as pantomime, dance, and clowning. Such physical skills were uncommon for continental actors of the time and would be necessary for performers looking to convey the meaning of their English-language scripts to audiences who spoke only German. That language barrier would, in time, cause the scripts of staples such as Romeo and Juliet and Titus Andronicus, and perhaps Hamlet, to be modified into simpler, more physical forms. Over time, as English troupes came to augment their numbers with German actors, their scripts would be translated into German editions.

=== Translation into English ===
Reflecting the importance of Q1 Hamlet on the perceived relevance of Fratricide Punished, the text was first translated into English by Georgina Archer, not for the sake of the play itself but rather for Albert Cohn's 1865 book Shakespeare in Germany. R.G. Latham provided another translation in 1872. Claiming that Archer's translation attempted to too heavily mimic the style of Shakespeare, and citing minor differences with Latham, Furness supplied a new translation in his 1877 Variorum collection. More recently, Christine Schmidle produced a translation for her 2010 theatrical production of the play, an experience that led her to believe that much of the comical effect of the work was a result of language barriers and adaptation experienced and undertaken by English actors performing in German-speaking lands.

== Significance ==
=== Relationship to Hamlet ===
While scholars generally agree that Fratricide Punished is a memorial reconstruction descended from some form of Hamlet, it remains uncertain from which Hamlet it comes. The differences and similarities between Fratricide Punished and the three major forms of Hamlet were examined line-by-line by George Duthie in his 1941 criticism of the so-called "bad quarto" of Q1, and the Variorum of Furness published the texts side-by-side as well. Their analyses found a play that contained elements both of Q1 Hamlet, published in 1603 but unknown until 1823, and the more familiar versions of the second quarto (1604) and folio (1623), as well as elements uniquely its own. This is a remarkably problematic finding for Shakespeare scholars, complicating an area already made difficult by the discovery of Q1. Indeed, the majority of what has been written about Fratricide Punished exists strictly to better understand its relation to Q1 Hamlet, such that it becomes troublesome to discuss one without the other.

Yet, as it contains elements of all three versions, it seems clear that Fratricide Punished must have been reconstructed by an actor with knowledge of more than one version of Hamlet. Kathleen Irace, in presenting this, argues that the use of the name Corambus instead of Polonius firmly ties Fratricide Punished to Q1, as does the "increased villainy" of the King, who alone is responsible for devising the poisoning plot. Yet, some elements exclusive to Q2 and F1 are found in the text as well. Irace points out that the first portion of the King's speech in Act I, Scene II is missing from Q1 Hamlet but oddly present in Fratricide Punished. Meanwhile, elements exclusive to the text or shared only with Q1 would seem to some scholars to link Fratricide Punished to the Ur-Hamlet, a kind of primordial source text which some scholars have suggested was used by Shakespeare in creating his Hamlet. The existence of the Ur-Hamlet is debated in itself. Lastly, Duthie argues that the long gap between the assumed time of the text's creation and its discovery is wholly unaccounted for, leaving room for any number of changes.

Zachary Lesser, discussing the impact of Q1 Hamlet on the popular reception of Q2 and F1, demonstrates the way that both Q1 and Fratricide Punished have been used to support arguments from multiple camps across decades of time, a testament to the ongoing significance of the work.

== Production history ==
Though it may have been born from production, few productions of Fratricide Punished have been undertaken since its discovery. In 1924, William Poel, a British actor and theater manager who had staged a production of Q1 Hamlet in 1881, mounted a production of the play in Oxford, England at the New Oxford Theatre. His promptbook, later published, contends that the audience met the characters with a derision and laughter far removed from the typical experience of Hamlet audiences. Joe Falocco argues that, by choosing to perform both Q1 and Fratricide Punished, Poel was demonstrating a willingness to disregard the importance of Shakespeare's authorship in the text, in accordance with earlier understandings of authorship, a constant facet of Hamlet discussions.

This is not to say that Fratricide Punished is without influence on theatrical productions. Both Q1 Hamlet and Fratricide Punished place their scenes in a different order than do the Q2 and folio versions of Hamlet, and this may have inspired stage directors to reorder their own productions of Hamlet in turn.

=== U.S. productions ===
A version of Fratricide Punished was performed at the NADA theater in New York City for the Hamlet Festival of 1994 alongside a rap version of Hamlet entitled "The Trage-D of Prince Hammy T." The play was directed by Randolph Curtis Rand. According to one reviewer, Rand chose to abandon more staid stage interpretations of Hamlet in order to highlight the comical elements of Fratricide Punished. Toward that end, Hamlet himself was portrayed wearing a loud tuxedo costume reminiscent of John Travolta's character in Saturday Night Fever, while the characters of the induction were portrayed as though members of The Addams Family.

==== Puppet productions ====
In 1981, Nino Amico suggested that Fratricide Punished was a play adapted for performance by puppets, sparking mild academic debate as well as the imagination of theater producers. The Hidden Room Theatre company, following up on the extensive research done by Tiffany Stern on Amico's claims, produced a puppet version that included live musical accompaniment and pyrotechnics. The initial production was performed in Staunton, Virginia at the American Shakespeare Center's reproduction of the Blackfriars Theater and went on for a full run in Austin, Texas. The company also performed Fratricide Punished at Shakespeare's Globe Theater, University College, Oxford, and the Shakespeare Institute, as well as at Villanova University in Philadelphia, Pennsylvania, with a talk from noted Shakespeare scholar Zachary Lesser of the University of Pennsylvania, and at other universities. It used a translation provided by Christine Schmidle, who had previously performed a German-language version of Fratricide Punished at the Center in 2010.

The Hidden Room Theatre won multiple awards for their performance, which was renewed for the 2016 season. Despite this success, the central premise of the performance remains unconvincing to some. June Schlueter, responding to Tiffany Stern's article, saw no basis for the assumption that Fratricide Punished was a play designed for puppets. Instead, she claims that the elements which lend themselves to puppets, such as the plays slapstick humor and physicality, are the result of actors adapting the work to make it more accessible beyond language barriers—a theme that Christine Schmidle also explored in her German language production of the play.

==== German language production ====
Fratricide Punished was performed in German at the American Shakespeare Center in 2010. The performance was conceived by Christine Schmidle, who would go on to translate the play for the 2015 puppet show there. Schmidle, like many scholars, believed the work to be the result of English comedic actors touring continental Europe in the late 1500s. By performing the play in German to an English speaking audience, she hoped to replicate (albeit in reverse) the kind of problems that those actors would have experienced in conveying meaning across language barriers. In an essay published by the Shakespeare Bulletin, Schmidle described the kinds of abridgments and added physicality that her troupe undertook in creating a play that would be accessible to the audience. Ultimately, she decided that Fratricide Punished represented a kind of road map to the play's origins, and that her performance clearly demonstrated that the differences existing between Hamlet and the text were made entirely in order to better convey meaning.

== See also ==
- Amleth
