= Valentine Simmes =

English printer (fl. 1585–1622)

Valentine Simmes (fl. 1585 – 1622) was an English printer of the Elizabethan and Jacobean eras. He did business in London, "on Adling Hill near Bainard's Castle at the sign of the White Swan." Simmes has a reputation as one of the better printers of his generation, and was responsible for several quartos of Shakespeare's plays. [See: Early texts of Shakespeare's works.]

Nothing is known of Simmes's early life or personal history. He was active as a printer starting in 1585.

== Shakespeare ==
In an eight-year period from 1597 through 1604, Simmes printed nine Shakespearean quartos for various London stationers or booksellers.

For the bookseller Andrew Wise, Simmes printed:

- Richard III, Q1 (1597)
- Richard II, Q1 (1597)
- Richard II, Q2 (1598)
- Richard II, Q3 (1598)

For Wise and William Aspley, Simmes printed:

- Henry IV, Part 2, Q (1600)
- Much Ado About Nothing, Q (1600)

For Thomas Millington, Simmes printed:

- Henry VI, Part 2, Q2 (1600)

For Nicholas Ling and John Trundell, Simmes printed:

- Hamlet Q1 (1603) — the "bad quarto".

For Matthew Law, Simmes printed:

- Henry IV, Part 1, Q3 (1604).

Also for Nicholas Ling, Simmes printed Q3 of The Taming of a Shrew (1607), the alternative version of Shakespeare's The Taming of the Shrew. (Scholars dispute the exact nature of the relationship between the two versions.) And for Thomas Pavier, Simmes printed Q1 of Sir John Oldcastle (1600), a play of the Shakespeare Apocrypha. For "the Widow Newman," Simmes printed the second, 1607 edition of Lawrence Twine's The Pattern of Painful Adventures, one of the sources for Shakespeare's Pericles, Prince of Tyre.

== Other drama ==
Simmes also printed a range of other significant texts in English Renaissance theatre, including:

- Day's An Humorous Day's Mirth (1599)
- Dekker's The Shoemaker's Holiday (1600)
- Marlowe's Doctor Faustus (1604), for publisher Thomas Bushell
- Jonson's The Coronation Triumph (1604), for Edward Blount
- The Entertainment at Althorp (1604), for Edward Blount
- Marston's The Malcontent (1604), for William Aspley
- Jonson's Hymenaei (1606), for Thomas Thorpe
- The Troublesome Reign of King John (Q2, 1611), for John Helme

— among other works. In Simmes's era, the specialties of printer and bookseller/publisher were usually practised separately, though some individuals, like William Jaggard, functioned in both. Simmes normally kept to the printshop side of the business, though he did occasionally publish too, as with the first quartos of George Chapman's Humorous Day's Mirth and Thomas Dekker's Shoemaker's Holiday.

== Other works ==
Best known for his printing of plays, Simmes worked on non-dramatic projects as well; he printed Salve Deus Rex Judaeorum (1611) for the bookseller Richard Bonian – a volume of poems by Emilia Lanier, it was one of the very rare books by a woman published in that era. For John Clapham's The History of Great Britain (1606), he was both printer and publisher.

== Reputation ==
While Simmes is recognized as among the best printers of his generation, a cynic might complain that this is not saying much — that it merely identifies Simmes as the best of a bad lot. Simmes, or his compositors, allowed 69 typographical errors in Richard II, Q1; when they printed Q2 they corrected 14 of these typos, but added 123 new ones.

Apart from his reputation for quality, Simmes "was constantly in trouble for printing unauthorized works, and in 1622 was forbidden to work as a master printer."
