= Sources of Hamlet =

Origin of the sources of Hamlet, Prince of Denmark

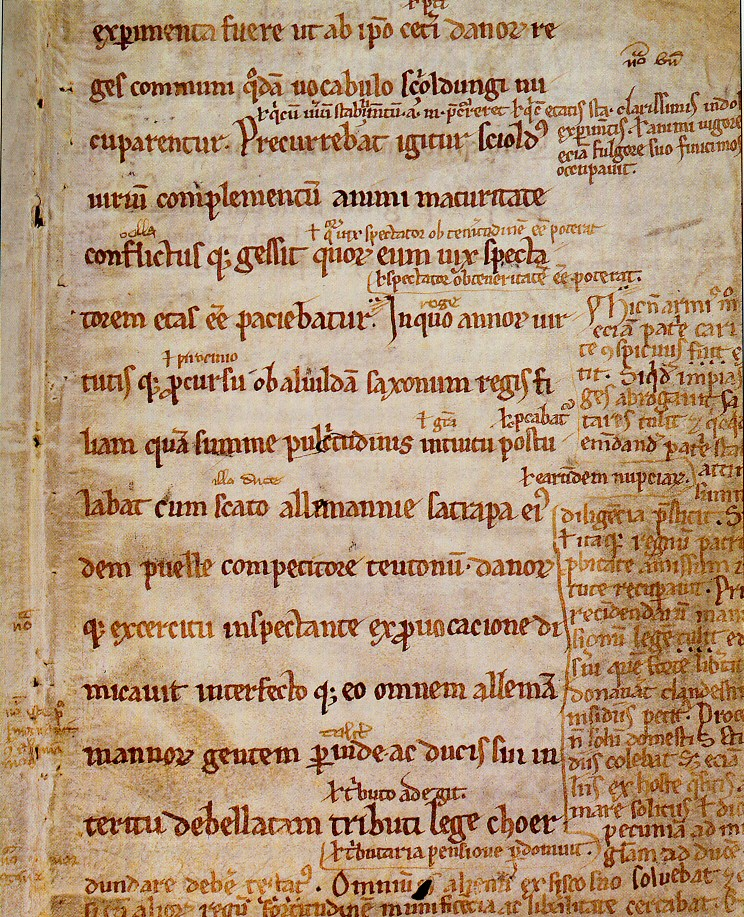
Saxo Grammaticus' Gesta Danorum (Angers Fragment), page 1, front

The sources of Hamlet, Prince of Denmark, a tragedy by William Shakespeare believed to have been written between 1599 and 1601, date to before the 13th century. The generic "hero-as-fool" story is so old and is expressed in the literature of so many cultures that scholars have hypothesized that it may be Indo-European in origin. A Scandinavian version of the story of Hamlet (called Amleth or Amlóði, which means "mad" or "not sane" in Old Norse) was put into writing around 1200 AD by Danish historian Saxo Grammaticus in his work Gesta Danorum (the first full history of Denmark). It is from this work that Shakespeare borrowed to create Hamlet. Similar accounts are found in the Icelandic Saga of Hrolf Kraki and the Roman legend of Lucius Junius Brutus, both of which feature heroes who pretend to be insane in order to get revenge. A reasonably accurate version of Saxo's story was translated into French in 1570 by François de Belleforest in his Histoires Tragiques. Belleforest embellished Saxo's text substantially, almost doubling its length, and introduced the hero's melancholy.

After this point, the ancestry of Shakespeare's version of Hamlet becomes more difficult to trace. Many literary scholars believe that Shakespeare's main source was an earlier play—now lost—known today as the Ur-Hamlet. Possibly written by Thomas Kyd, the Ur-Hamlet would have been in performance by 1589 and was seemingly the first to include a ghost in the story. Using the few comments available from theatre-enthusiasts at the time, scholars have attempted to trace exactly where the Ur-Hamlet might have ended and the play popular today begins. A few scholars have suggested that the Ur-Hamlet is an early draft of Shakespeare's, rather than the work of Kyd. Regardless of the mysteries surrounding the Ur-Hamlet, though, several elements of the story changed. Unlike earlier versions, Shakespeare's Hamlet does not feature an omniscient narrator of events and Prince Hamlet does not appear to have a complete plan of action. The play's setting in Elsinore also differs from legendary versions.

== Scandinavian legend ==
The story of the prince who plots revenge on his uncle (the current king) for killing his father (the former king) is an old one. Many of the story elements—the prince feigning madness and his testing by a young woman, the prince talking to his mother and her hasty marriage to the usurper, the prince killing a hidden spy and substituting the execution of two retainers for his own—are found in a medieval tale by Saxo Grammaticus called Vita Amlethi (part of his larger Latin work Gesta Danorum), which was written around 1200 AD. Older written and oral traditions from various cultures may have influenced Saxo's work. Amleth (as Hamlet is called in Saxo's version) probably derived from an oral tale told throughout Scandinavia. Parallels can be found with Icelandic legend, though no written version of the original Icelandic tale survives from before the 16th century. Torfaeus, a scholar in 17th-century Iceland, made the connection between Saxo's Amleth and local oral tradition about a Prince Ambales (Amlóði). (Note: The etymology of the name is unknown, and there are various suggestions. In 1948, Ferdinand Holthausen suggested it is based on the "fool, simpleton" interpretation of the name, composing the name from Old Norse ama "to vex, annoy, molest" and óðr "fierceness, madness" (also in the theonym Odin). A more recent suggestion, by L. A. Collinson in The Review of English Studies, is based on the kenning associating Amlóði with the mythological mill grotti, and derives it from the Old Irish name Admlithi "great-grinding", attested in Togail Bruidne Dá Derga.) Torfaeus dismissed the local tradition as "an old wive's tale" due to its incorporation of fairy-tale elements and quasi-historical legend and Torfaeus' own confusion about the hero's country of origin (not recognizing Cimbria as a name for Denmark).

Similarities include the prince's feigned madness, his accidental killing of the king's counsellor in his mother's bedroom, and the eventual slaying of his uncle.

The original Amlóði story has been surmised to be derived from a "10th-century" Old Icelandic poem, but no such poem is known.

The "hero as fool" story has many parallels (Roman, Spanish, Scandinavian and Arabic) and can be classified as a universal, or at least common Indo-European, narrative topos.

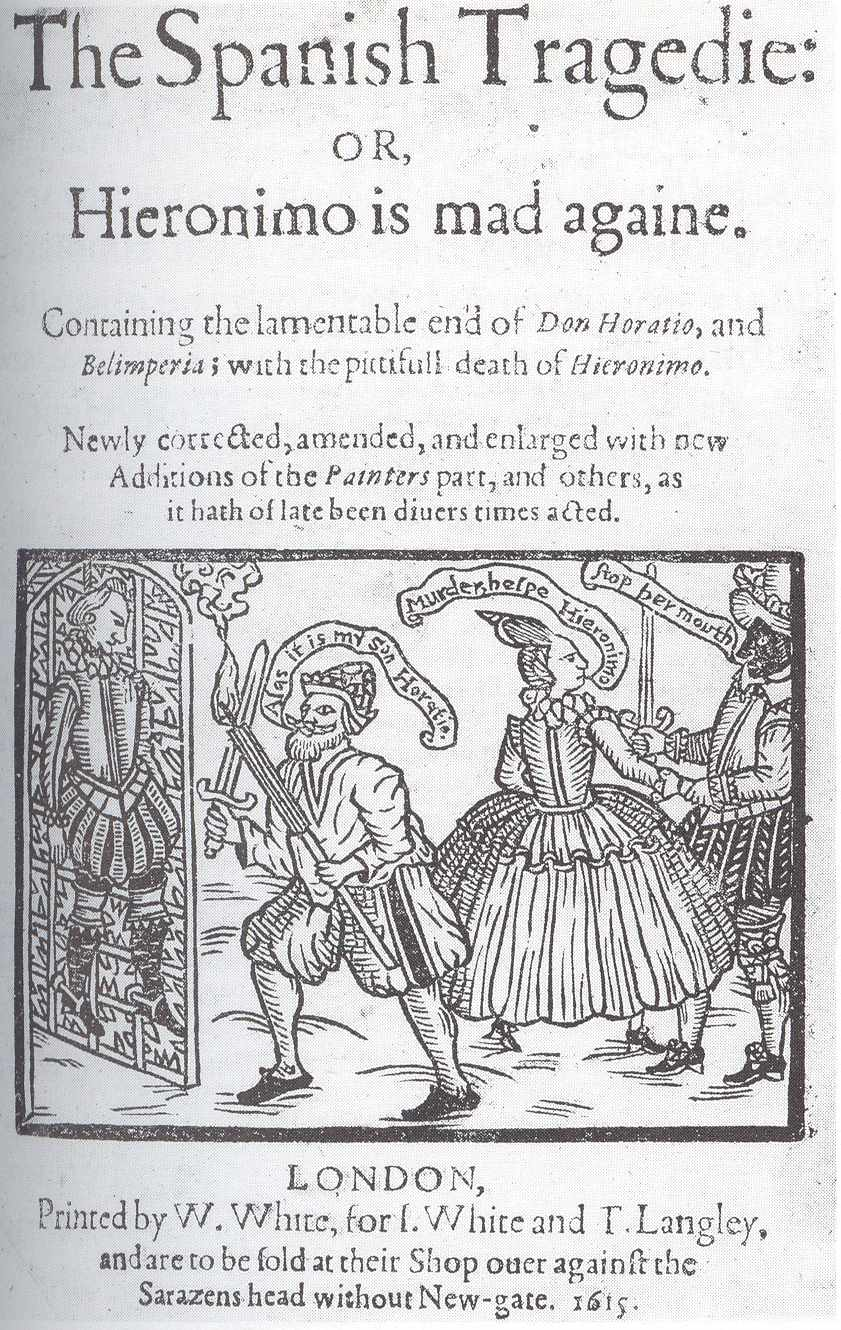
The Spanish Tragedy, by Thomas Kyd. This popular revenge tragedy may have influenced Hamlet. Its author may have also written the Ur-Hamlet.

== Influences on Saxo Grammaticus ==
The two most popular candidates for written works that may have influenced Saxo, however, are the anonymous Scandinavian Saga of Hrolf Kraki and the Roman legend of Brutus, which is recorded in two separate Latin works. In Saga of Hrolf Kraki, the murdered king has two sons—Hroar and Helgi—who assume the names of Ham and Hráni for concealment. They spend most of the story in disguise, rather than feigning madness, though Ham does act childishly at one point to deflect suspicion. The sequence of events differs from Shakespeare's as well.

In contrast, the Roman story of Brutus focuses on feigned madness. Its hero, Lucius ('shining, light'), changes his name and persona to Brutus ('dull, stupid'), playing the role to avoid the fate of his father and brothers, and eventually slaying his family's killer, King Tarquinius. In addition to writing in the Latin language of the Romans, Saxo adjusted the story to reflect classical Roman concepts of virtue and heroism. A reasonably accurate version of Saxo's story was translated into French in 1570 by François de Belleforest in his Histoires Tragiques. Belleforest embellished Saxo's text substantially, almost doubling its length, and introduced the hero's melancholy. William Painter included a translation into English of Belleforest's Histoires in his anthology Palace of Pleasure, published in London in 1567.

== The Ur-Hamlet ==
Shakespeare's main source is believed to be an earlier play—now lost—known today as the Ur-Hamlet. Possibly written by Thomas Kyd or a 25 year-old Shakespeare himself, the Ur-Hamlet would have been in performance by 1589, and was seemingly the first to include a ghost in the story. Shakespeare's company, the Lord Chamberlain's Men, may have purchased that play and performed a version, which Shakespeare reworked, for some time. Since no copy of the Ur-Hamlet has survived, it is impossible to compare its language and style with the known works of any candidate for its authorship. Consequently, there is no direct evidence that Kyd wrote it, nor any evidence that the play was not an early version of Hamlet by Shakespeare himself. This latter idea—placing Hamlet far earlier than the generally accepted date, with a much longer period of development—has attracted some support, though others dismiss it as speculation. (Note: In his 1936 book The Problem of Hamlet: A Solution Andrew Cairncross asserted that the Hamlet referred to in 1589 was written by Shakespeare; Peter Alexander, Eric Sams and, more recently, Harold Bloom have agreed. However Harold Jenkins, the editor of the second series Arden edition of the play, considers that there are not grounds for thinking that the Ur-Hamlet is an early work by Shakespeare, which he then rewrote.) Francis Meres's Palladis Tamia (published in 1598, probably October) provides a list of twelve named Shakespeare plays, but Hamlet is not among them. This is not conclusive, however, as other then-extant Shakespeare plays were not on Meres' list either.

The upshot is that scholars cannot assert with any confidence how much material Shakespeare took from the Ur-Hamlet (if it even existed), how much from Belleforest or Saxo, and how much from other contemporary sources (such as Kyd's The Spanish Tragedy). No clear evidence exists that Shakespeare made any direct references to Saxo's version (although its Latin text was widely available at the time). However, elements of Belleforest's version do appear in Shakespeare's play but are not in Saxo's story, so whether Shakespeare took these from Belleforest directly or through the Ur-Hamlet remains unclear.

It is clear, though, that several elements did change somewhere between Belleforest's and Shakespeare's versions. For one, unlike Saxo and Belleforest, Shakespeare's play has no all-knowing narrator, thus inviting the audience to draw their own conclusions about the motives of its characters. And the traditional story takes place across several years, while Shakespeare's covers a few weeks. Belleforest's version details Hamlet's plan for revenge, while in Shakespeare's play Hamlet has no apparent plan. Shakespeare also adds some elements that locate the action in 15th-century Christian Denmark instead of a medieval pagan setting. Elsinore, for example, would have been familiar to Elizabethan England, as a new castle had been built recently there, and Wittenberg, Hamlet's university, was widely known for its Protestant teachings. Other elements of Shakespeare's Hamlet absent in medieval versions include the secrecy that surrounds the old king's murder, the inclusion of Laertes and Fortinbras (who offer parallels to Hamlet), the testing of the king via a play, and Hamlet's death at the moment he gains his revenge. (Note: Harold Jenkins, in the Arden Shakespeare second series edition of Hamlet, includes a detailed discussion of many possible influences that may have found their way into the play.)

== Elizabethan court ==
For more than a century, Shakespearean scholars have identified several of the play's major characters with specific members of the Elizabethan court. In 1869, George Russell French theorized that Hamlet's Polonius might have been inspired by William Cecil (Lord Burghley)—Lord High Treasurer and chief counsellor to Queen Elizabeth I. French also speculated that the characters of Polonius's children, Ophelia and Laertes, represented two of Burghley's children, Anne and Robert Cecil. In 1930, E. K. Chambers suggested that Polonius's advice to Laertes may have echoed Burghley's to his son Robert, and in 1932, John Dover Wilson commented "the figure of Polonius is almost without doubt intended as a caricature of Burleigh, who died on 4 August 1598". In 1963, A. L. Rowse said that Polonius's tedious verbosity might have resembled Burghley's, and in 1964, Joel Hurstfield wrote that "[t]he governing classes were both paternalistic and patronizing; and nowhere is this attitude better displayed than in the advice which that archetype of elder statesmen William Cecil, Lord Burghley—Shakespeare's Polonius—prepared for his son".

Lilian Winstanley thought the name Corambis (Polonius's name in the 1st Quarto) suggested Burghley, though Krystyna Kujawinska Courtney has pointed out that the name "Corambis" translates to "reheated cabbage" in Latin, i.e. "a boring old man".

In 1921, Winstanley claimed "absolute" certainty that "the historical analogues exist; that they are important, numerous, detailed and undeniable" and that "Shakespeare is using a large element of contemporary history in Hamlet." She compared Hamlet with both the Earl of Essex and James I. She also identified Polonius with Burghley parallels, and noted a "curious parallel" in the relationship between Ophelia and Hamlet with that of Burghley's daughter, Anne Cecil, and her husband, Edward de Vere, 17th Earl of Oxford. Winstanley noted similar parallels in the relationship of Elizabeth Vernon and Henry Wriothesley, 3rd Earl of Southampton.

Harold Jenkins criticised the idea of any direct personal satire as "unlikely" and "uncharacteristic of Shakespeare", while G. R. Hibbard hypothesized that differences in names (Corambis/Polonius; Montano/Raynoldo) between the first quarto and subsequent editions might reflect a desire not to offend scholars at Oxford University, since Polonius was close to the Latin name for Robert Pullen, founder of Oxford University, and Reynaldo too close for safety to John Rainolds, the President of Corpus Christi College.

== Shakespeare's son ==
In Belleforest's version the hero's name had been Amleth, and in Saxo's version Amlethus. The author of the Ur-Hamlet, perhaps Shakespeare himself, seems to have been the first to drop the final H (originally indicating a Scandinavian TH-sound) and to attach an H to the front of the name. (Note: The 1608 translation of Belleforest into English calls this story the Hystorie of Hamblet, presumably because the name Hamlet was now well-known in England, because of the play.) Most scholars, including Harold Bloom, dismiss the idea that Hamlet is in any way connected with Shakespeare's only son, Hamnet Shakespeare, who died at age eleven. Conventional wisdom holds that Hamlet is too obviously connected to legend, and the name Hamnet was quite popular at the time. However, Stephen Greenblatt has argued that the coincidence of the names and Shakespeare's grief for the loss of his son may lie at the heart of the tragedy. He notes that the name of Hamnet Sadler, the Stratford neighbor after whom Hamnet was named, was often written as Hamlet Sadler and that, in the loose orthography of the time, the names were virtually interchangeable.

== Giordano Bruno ==
In 1846, Christian Bartholomess, a French biographer writing a life of the sixteenth-century Italian philosopher Giordano Bruno, made a passing reference to similarities between Hamlet's musings on death, and De La Causa, a "dialogue" written by his subject while staying in London in 1584. A later biography from Ferdinand Falkson (1846) made the same observation. Benno Tschischwitz, a nineteenth-century translator of Shakespeare's works into German, compared examples from Bruno's philosophy and phraseology with particular passages from Hamlet, in his Shakespeares Hamlet, nach historischen Gesichtspunkten erläutert of 1868. Hilary Gatti, an academic specialising in the life of Bruno, attributes the parallels of Hamlet with Bruno's Lo Spaccia della Bestia Trionfonte and his comedy Il Candelajo to John Florio, an Italian translator living in London: Shakespeare was an associate of Florio and he drew heavily on the translator's works for his plays. Bruno stayed with Florio while in London. Conversely, in comparing the dates of Bruno's stay in London (1583 to 1585) with Shakespeare's first coming to notice in the city, Georg Brandes assesses that they scarcely had time to meet. The editor of the New Variorum edition of Hamlet, H. H. Furness, considered the similarities between the play and the Bruno canon to be slight and not meaningful, given Shakespeare's eclectic mind. John Mackinnon Robertson, writing in 1897, suggested that the completely commonplace similarities in wording between Bruno's Il Candelajo and Hamlet were actually within the text of Ur-Hamlet (above), rather than Shakespeare's later play and, furthermore, were from a work "drafted by a much lesser man than Shakespere. [sic]".

== Sources ==
=== Editions of Hamlet ===
- Edwards, Phillip, ed. (1985). Hamlet, Prince of Denmark. New Cambridge Shakespeare. Cambridge: Cambridge University Press. ISBN 0-19-283416-9.
- Hibbard, G. R., ed. (1987). Hamlet. The Oxford Shakespeare. Oxford: Oxford University Press. ISBN 0-19-283416-9.
- Jenkins, Harold, ed. (1982). Hamlet. The Arden Shakespeare, second series. London: Methuen. ISBN 1-903436-67-2.

=== Secondary sources ===
- Alexander, Peter (1964). Alexander's Introductions to Shakespeare. London: Collins. OCLC 257743100.
- Bloom, Harold (2001). Shakespeare: The Invention of the Human (Open Market ed.). Harlow, Essex: Longman. ISBN 1-57322-751-X.
- —— (2003). Hamlet: Poem Unlimited. Edinburgh: Canongate. ISBN 1-84195-461-6.
- Cairncross, Andrew S. (1975) [1936]. The Problem of Hamlet: A Solution (Reprint ed.). Norwood, PA: Norwood Editions. ISBN 0-88305-130-3.
- Chambers, E. K. (1930). William Shakespeare: A Study of Facts and Problems. Vol. I. Oxford: Clarendon Press. ISBN 0-19-811774-4.
- Collinson, L. A. (2011). "A New Etymology for Hamlet? The Names Amlethus, Amlođi and Admlithi". Review of English Studies. 62 (257). Oxford University Press: 675–694. doi:10.1093/res/hgr008. eISSN 1471-6968. ISSN 0034-6551 – via Oxford Journals Online.
- Courtney, Krystyna Kujawinska (2003). "Shakespeare in Poland". Shakespeare around the Globe. Internet Shakespeare Editions (University of Victoria). ISBN 1-55058-302-6.
- French, George Russell (1975) [1869]. Shakespeareana Genealogica. Vol. I (reprinted ed.). London: AMS Press. ISBN 0-404-02575-7.
- Gatti, Hilary (1989). The Renaissance Drama of Knowledge. London: Routledge. ISBN 0-415-03207-5.
- —— (2011). Essays on Giordano Bruno. Princeton University Press. ISBN 978-0-691-14574-7.
- Gollancz, Israel, ed. (1898). Hamlet in Iceland: Being the Icelandic romantic Ambales saga, edited and translated, with extracts from five Ambales Rimur and other illustrative texts, for the most part now first printed, and an introductory essay. Northern Library. Vol. III. London: David Nutt, Strand. OCLC 3254561.
- ——, ed. (1926). The Sources of Hamlet: with an essay on the legend. The Shakespeare Classics. Oxford University Press. OCLC 2192790.
- Greenblatt, Stephen (2004). Will in the World: How Shakespeare Became Shakespeare. New York: W.W. Norton & Co. ISBN 0-393-05057-2.
- —— (21 October 2004). "The Death of Hamnet and the Making of Hamlet". The New York Review of Books. Vol. 51, no. 16.
- Saxo Grammaticus (1983). Hansen, William (ed.). Saxo Grammaticus and the Life of Hamlet: A Translation, History, and Commentary. Lincoln: University of Nebraska Press. ISBN 0-8032-2318-8.
- Harrison, Henry; Harrison, Gyđa Pulling (1912). Surnames of the United Kingdom: A Concise Etymological Dictionary. Vol. 1. London: Eaton Press. OCLC 5021363.
- Holthausen, Ferdinand (1948). Vergleichendes und etymologisches Wörterbuch des Altwestnordischen, Altnorwegisch-isländischen, einschliesslich der Lehn- und Fremdwörter sowie der Eigennamen. Göttingen: Vandenhoeck & Ruprecht. OCLC 215188285.
- Hurstfield, Joel (1964). "The Elizabethan People in the Age of Shakespeare". In Hurstfield, Joel; Sutherland, James (eds.). Shakespeare's World. Edward Arnold.
- Jackson, MacDonald (1991). "The Year's Contributions to Shakespeare Studies: 3 – Editions and Textual Studies". In Wells, Stanley (ed.). The Tempest and After. Shakespeare Survey. Vol. 43. Cambridge University Press. pp. 255–270. ISBN 9781139053204.
- Jenkins, Harold (1955). "The Relation between the Second Quarto and the Folio Text of "Hamlet"". Studies in Bibliography. 7: 69–83. ISSN 0081-7600. JSTOR 40372122.
- Rowse, A. L. (1995) [1963]. William Shakespeare: A Biography. New York: Barnes & Noble Books. ISBN 1-56619-804-6.
- Wilson, J. Dover (1932). The Essential Shakespeare: A Biographical Adventure. Cambridge: Cambridge University Press.
- Winstanley, Lilian (1921). Hamlet and the Scottish succession: Being an examination of the relations of the play of Hamlet to the Scottish succession and the Essex conspiracy. Cambridge: Cambridge University Press. OL 7060036M.
