= Hamlet Q1 =

First printed edition of "Hamlet"

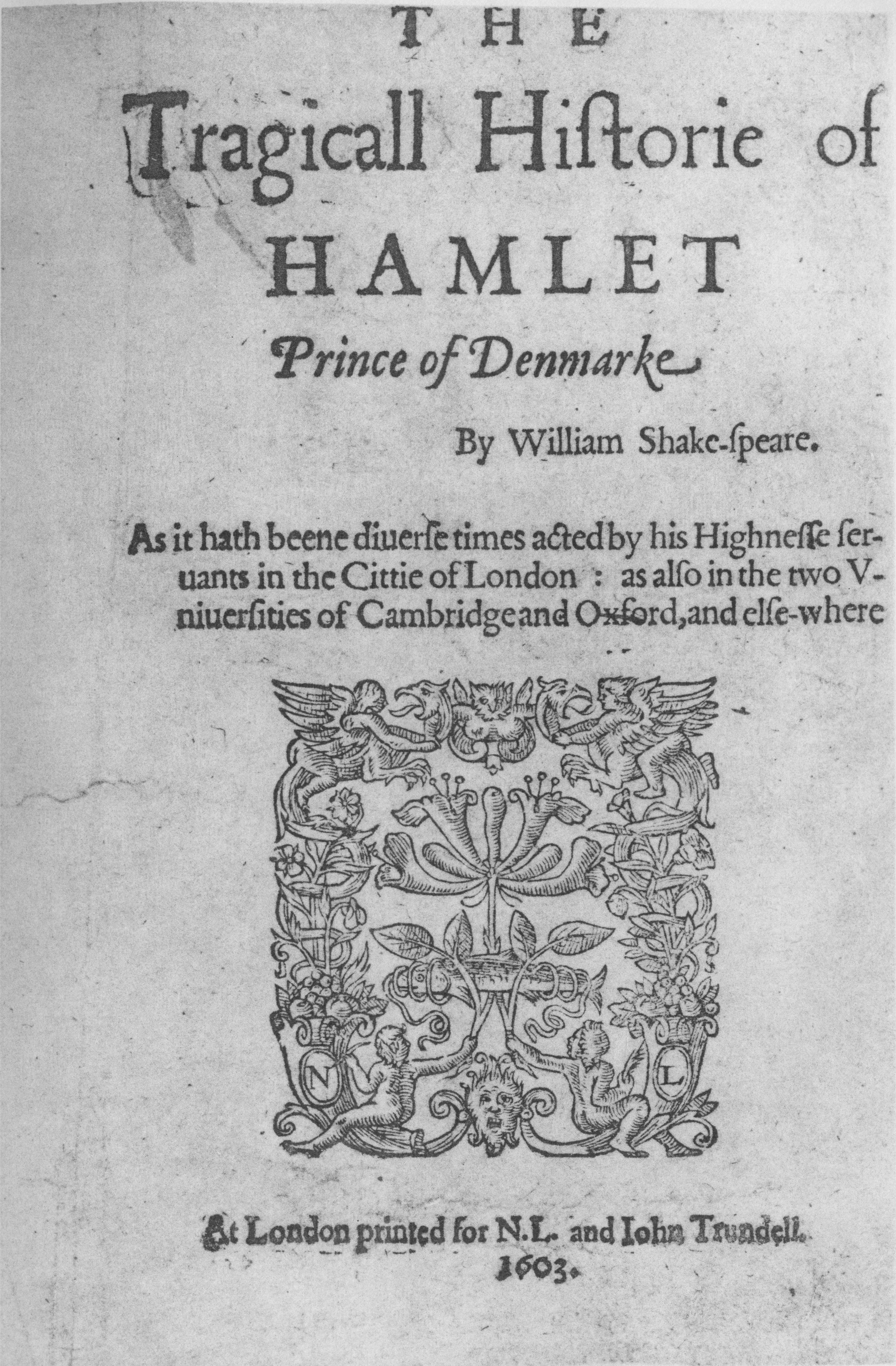
Hamlet Q1 title page, 1603

Q1 of Hamlet (also called the "First Quarto", full title The Tragicall Historie of Hamlet Prince of Denmarke) is a short early text of the Shakespearean play. The intended publication of the play is entered in the Stationers' Register in 1602 by James Roberts, but Q1 was not published until summer or autumn 1603. It was published by the booksellers Nicholas Ling and John Trundle, and printed by Valentine Simmes. Roberts later printed the "Second Quarto" (Q2).

The other two early printed texts of Hamlet are the Second Quarto (Q2, 1604) and First Folio (F1, 1623) (subsequent quartos over the period 1604–1623 are all, at least in their substantive features, derived from Q2). Both Q2 and F1 are more than 1600 lines longer than Q1.

Q1 was unknown until 1823, when the first of only two known copies was discovered by Sir Henry Bunbury. Since then the exact relationship between Q1 and the other early texts of the play, as well as its origin as a text, has been extensively debated but no scholarly consensus has been reached.

== Unique characteristics ==
In addition to the fact that Q1 is much shorter than both Q2 and the F1 version of the play, it has a number of unique characteristics. It contains rich stage directions, which may be survivals from early performances which were excluded from other printed editions. There are many oddities and unexplained bits of action, consistent with crude cutting of the text (how Hamlet escapes from the ship to England is unexplained, as is the arrival of the English ambassadors). Some scenes take place at a different point in the story – for example Hamlet's "To be, or not to be" soliloquy occurs in Act Two, immediately after Polonius proposes to set up an "accidental" meeting between Hamlet and Ophelia.

Strikingly, the role of Gertrude is significantly different, since she becomes an accomplice of Hamlet in his plot against Claudius, insisting that she knew nothing of her first husband's murder and agreeing to help her son. There is an entire scene between Horatio and Gertrude in which Horatio tells her that Hamlet has escaped from the ship after discovering Claudius' plan to kill him. Gertrude says that she now recognises Claudius' "villany", but she will "soothe and please him for a time" to lull him into a false sense of security.

Another significant difference is that the character of Polonius is called "Corambis" while his servant Reynoldo is named "Montano". Various suggestions have been made to explain this. According to one view, this may be an accidental intrusion of details from the so-called Ur-Hamlet, in which the presumed reporting actor may have also played. G. R. Hibbard argues that these last changes were made because Q1 derives from a touring version of the play, which was intended to include a performance at Oxford University. Hibbard believes that the original names were too close to those of two famous Oxford scholars, the university's founder Robert Polenius and the Puritan theologian John Rainolds. Since Polonius is a parody of a pompous pseudo-intellectual and his servant acts as a spy, the names might have been interpreted as deliberate insults. The title page of Q1 specifically states that the play was recently performed in "the Cittie of London: as also in the two Universities of Cambridge and Oxford, and else-where".

== Bad quarto theory ==
After its discovery in 1823, its initial editors typically took the view that Q1 was an early draft of the play, perhaps even a revision of the Ur-Hamlet, but John Payne Collier argued in 1843 that it was simply a bad version: a "pirated" text, one of the "stol'n and surreptitious copies, maimed and deformed by frauds and stealths of injurious impostors", which were denounced in the preface to the 1623 First Folio.

This view became increasingly prominent in the 20th century. It was one of the publications named by the bibliographer Alfred W. Pollard as a "bad quarto" in 1909, a term he coined to distinguish several texts that he judged significantly corrupt. In 1915 Henry David Gray analysed Q1 using the model of memorial reconstruction, the idea that some publications were based on the memories of actors hired to play minor roles. He concluded that the actor who played Marcellus was responsible for the reconstruction. He explained the fact that the "mousetrap" scene, in which Marcellus does not appear, was also accurate by suggesting that the same actor must have also played one of the roles in that scene. Grey argued that hired actors playing minor roles would be more susceptible to bribery than established actors in the company, as they had much less to lose. An anonymous writer probably filled out the missing verses.

In 1943 G. I. Duthie published The 'Bad' Quarto of 'Hamlet', a book in which he argued in great detail for the memorial reconstruction theory, asserting that the actor probably played the roles of Marcellus and Lucianus and had been hired for a provincial touring production. W. W. Greg had argued that the actor may also have played another small role, that of Voltemar, but Duthie disagreed with this view.

=== Relation to Q2 ===
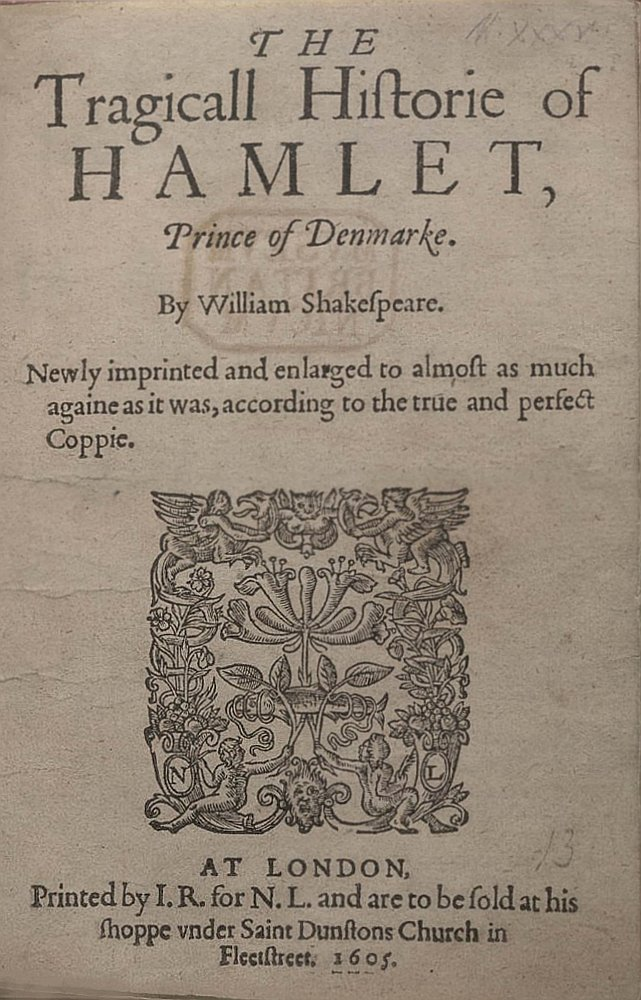
Title page of the 1605 printing (Q2) of Hamlet

The publication of the so-called "good quarto" (Q2) of Hamlet so soon after Q1 has been explained as the result of the fact that Q1 was so corrupt. Possibly Shakespeare or his company thought it necessary to publish the true text to preserve the author's reputation. The title page states that it is "Newly imprinted and enlarged to almost as much againe as it was, according to the true and perfect coppie". Jonathan Bate states that Q2 is "apparently the one closest to Shakespere's original manuscript, but it may represent a 'reading' text as opposed to a 'performance' one".

The situation is complicated by the fact that the original 1602 entry in the Stationers' Register was made by James Roberts, the printer of Q2, not Valentine Simmes, the printer of Q1. A. W. Pollard argued that Roberts was acting on behalf of Shakespeare's company, and that the entry was intended, albeit unsuccessfully, to block the publication of the play by another publisher. Gerald D. Johnson suggests, in contrast, that Roberts made a deal with the bookseller Nicholas Ling, allowing Ling to use another printer to publish Q1 first, but giving Roberts the right to print the much more substantial "good" version later, from which both would profit, with Ling getting to sell the same play twice.

== Alternate version theory ==
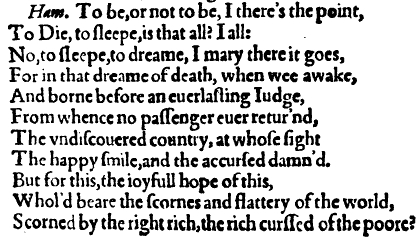
The "To be, or not to be" soliloquy from the 1603 quarto of Hamlet

While the "bad quarto" theory is still widely accepted, some later scholars have taken a very different view, arguing that the text may be an accurate version of an alternative form of the play. Albert B. Weiner argued in 1962 that Q1 represented a "tourbook" copy, derived originally from a text similar to Q2 or F, which had been trimmed and simplified for performance by a small number of actors on tour in the provinces. However, Hardin Craig disagrees in his introduction to Weiner's edition, arguing that Q1 is descended from an earlier draft of the play and that "the second quarto is Shakespeare's revision and amplification of that earlier play." Craig's argument was based on his observation of significant "structural difference" between Q1 and the other texts, that "the first quarto follows the order of events [in the plot] as they appear in Saxo and Belleforest" but that the second quarto, while doubtless a better play, "does not", and in fact interjects "more than 800 lines of other dramatic matter" between the decision of the King and Polonius to spy on Hamlet and the "get thee to a nunnery" scene in which the spying actually transpires.

The most prominent opponent of the "bad quarto" view was Eric Sams, who argued that Q1 represented an early version of the play and that distinctive spelling variations typical of Shakespeare imply that it was set up from his manuscript.

Other scholars reject these arguments. G.R. Hibbard states categorically that: "As for that text itself, it is a completely illegitimate and unreliable one, having no direct contact with any Shakespearian manuscript, or with any transcript of such a manuscript...Moreover, very little care seems to have been exercised over the actual printing, for passages of sheer nonsense abound". Bate, in his 2008 edition of Hamlet, states that only a few scholars believe that an earlier version of Shakespeare's play existed and that only a "tiny minority" believe that the "poorly printed" Q1 "may in some way derive from it". However, he also argues that Q1 gives useful information about early productions of the play, especially how it may have been cut for performance.

== Modern performances ==
Q1 has been described as "eminently actable" despite its shortcomings. A number of modern performances of Hamlet have been based entirely or partially on Q1.
