= Richard Baldwin =

Richard Baldwin may refer to:

- Richard C. Baldwin (born 1947), judge on the Oregon Supreme Court
- Richard J. Baldwin (1853–1944), Speaker of the Pennsylvania House of Representatives, 1917–1918
- Richard Baldwin (economist), American professor of international economics
- Richard Baldwin (provost) (c. 1672–1758), provost of Trinity College, Dublin
- Richard Baldwin (publisher) (c. 1653–1698), British printer accused of seditious work
- Rick Baldwin (1955–1997), American racing driver
- Dick Baldwin, American film actor
