= Nicholas Ling =

British publisher and bookseller

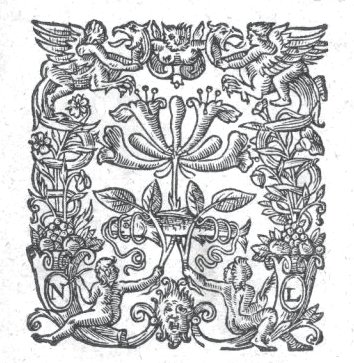
The publisher's device of Nicholas Ling was a codfish entwined with honeysuckle. The codfish, also known as a "ling," is a rebus of Ling's last name. The honeysuckle is an phonetic anagram of his first name: "Nicholas"="Honisocal."

Nicholas Ling (fl.1570–1607) was a London publisher, bookseller, and editor who published several important Elizabethan works, including the first and second quartos of Shakespeare's Hamlet.

Ling was the son of John Lynge, a parchment maker from Norwich. He was apprenticed to Henry Bitteman in 1570 and was admitted to the Stationers' Company as a "freeman" (full member) in 1578. He generally partnered with other publishers. In 1597 he edited Politeuphuia, or Wits Commonwealth, a collection of prose quotations. He has also been credited by some critics with editing England's Helicon (1600), a collection of Elizabethan lyric poems.

In 1603 he collaborated with another bookseller, John Trundell, to publish the first quarto of Hamlet. This edition, printed by Valentine Simmes, has been widely condemned as a wildly inaccurate and badly printed travesty of the play. A few months later James Roberts printed the much more substantial and accurate second quarto according to the "true and perfect copy" of Shakespeare's manuscript. Gerald D. Johnson suggests that Trundell had acquired a garbled version of the text, which was quickly published in association with Ling to meet demand. Roberts had been given official access to Shakespeare's manuscript by the company, as he had entered it as a forthcoming publication in the Stationers' Register in 1602. He made a deal with Ling that Roberts would print the much more substantial "good" version a little while later, giving Ling exclusive sales rights, cutting out Trundell. Both would profit, with Ling getting to sell the same play twice.

In 1607 he transferred 16 copyrights to John Smethwick, among them three Shakespeare plays (Hamlet, Romeo and Juliet, and Love's Labour's Lost) as well as The Taming of a Shrew.
