= John Jowett =

English Shakespeare scholar and editor

John D. Jowett is an English Shakespeare scholar and editor. He is the Professor of Shakespeare Studies at the University of Birmingham and Deputy Director of the Shakespeare Institute.

Born in Lancashire, England, Jowett took his BA and MA at Newcastle-upon-Tyne, and was awarded a PhD from Liverpool University. His doctoral thesis was an edition of Henry Chettle's Tragedy of Hoffman (1983). He went to the Oxford University Press as an academic editor of the Oxford edition of Shakespeare's Complete Works (1986–87). He was lecturer at the University of Waikato in Hamilton, New Zealand, and taught for a year at the University of Glasgow. He was appointed to the Shakespeare Institute in 1993. He is the general editor of the New Oxford Shakespeare and general editor of Arden Early Modern Drama, a series that publishes non-Shakespearean drama of the early modern period; and serves on the editorial board of the Malone Society and the advisory board of Internet Shakespeare Editions.

== Major publications ==
- Chettle, Henry. The Tragedy of Hoffman (1983) University of Liverpool.
- William Shakespeare, Complete Works (1986, rev. 2005) ed. with Wells, Taylor, and Montgomery, Oxford University Press.
- William Shakespeare: A Textual Companion (1987) With Wells, Taylor, and Montgomery, Oxford University Press.
- Shakespeare, William. Richard III (2000) Oxford University Press.
- Shakespeare, William, and Thomas Middleton. Timon of Athens (2004) Oxford University Press.
- Shakespeare and Text. (2007) Oxford University Press.
