= Philological Quarterly =

- Discipline: Medieval studies, literature
- Language: English
- Edited by: Eric Gidal

Publication details
- History: 1922-present
- Publisher: University of Iowa, Department of English (United States)
- Frequency: Quarterly

Standard abbreviations
- ISO 4: Philol. Q.

Indexing
- ISSN: 0031-7977
- LCCN: 27013435
- OCLC no.: 1762267

Links
- Journal homepage; Online abstracts

The Philological Quarterly is a peer-reviewed academic journal covering research on medieval European and modern literature and culture. It was established in 1922 by Hardin Craig. The inaugural issue of the journal was made available at sixty cents per copy and included articles on Chaucer, Henry Fielding, and Shakespeare, among others. Berthold Ullman served with three colleagues on the original board of associate editors. Bill Kupersmith guided the journal through disciplinary reorganizations and changing academic norms during his thirty-year service as editor of the journal.

The current editor-in-chief is Eric Gidal.
