= The Coronation Triumph =

Play written by Ben Jonson

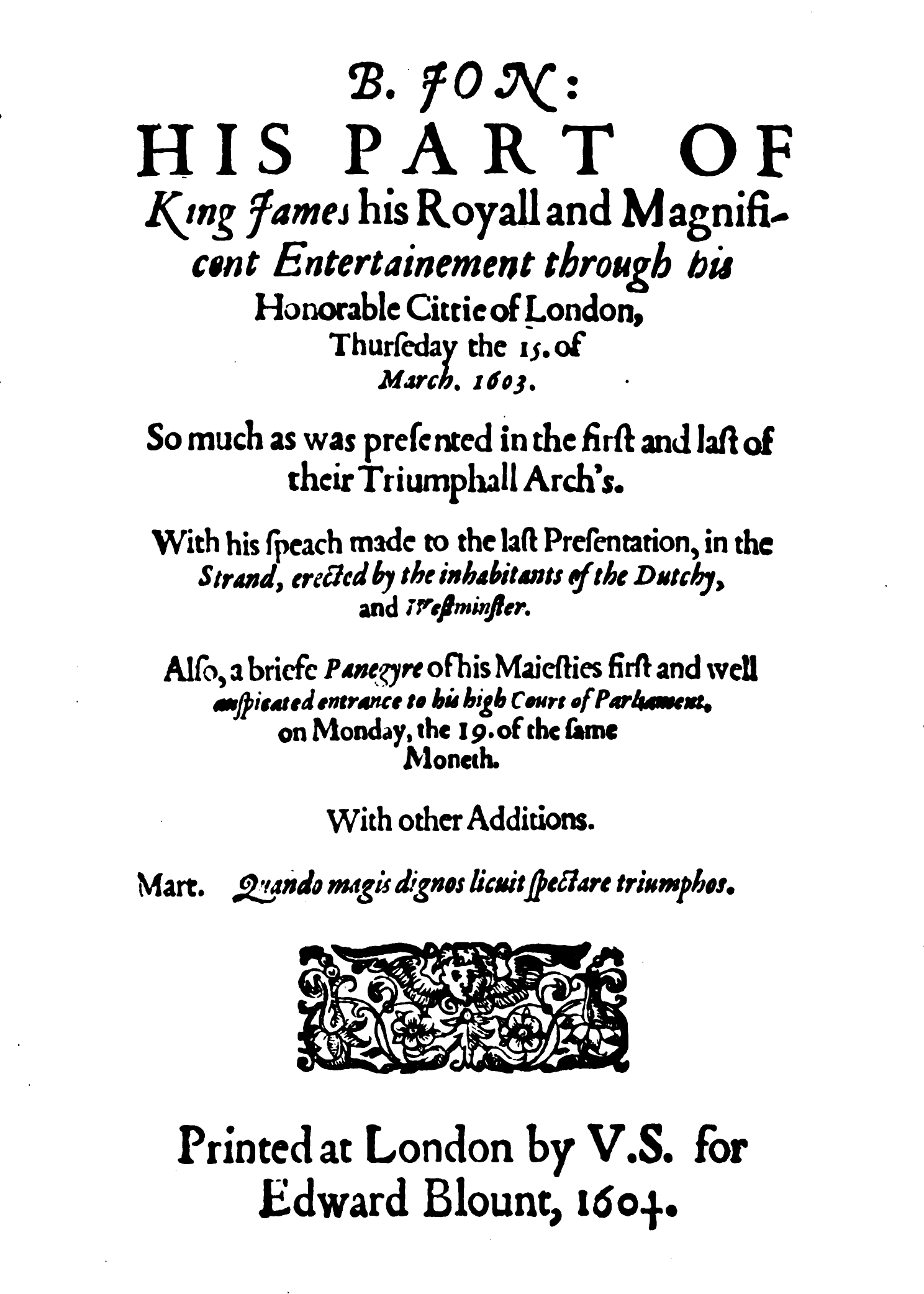
Title page of Ben Jonson's quarto of 1604

The Coronation Triumph is a Jacobean era literary work, usually classed as an "entertainment", written by Ben Jonson for the coronation of King James I and performed on 15 March 1604. The event was postponed due to plague in London.

Jonson's work was half of a total performance, the other half written by Thomas Dekker. The work was especially significant in the developing literary career of Jonson, in that it marked the commencement of his role as a writer of masques and entertainments for the Stuart Court, a role he would fill for the next three decades.

The entertainment "confusingly goes by several names" – including The King's Entertainment, and Part of the King's Entertainment in Passing to His Coronation. Under the latter title, Jonson's work was entered into the Stationers' Register on 19 March 1604 and published later that year along with another of his Stuart entertainments, The Entertainment at Althorp, in a quarto printed by Valentine Simmes for the bookseller Edward Blount. The work was reprinted in the first folio collection of Jonson's works in 1616, and was included in the collected works thereafter. Dekker's portion of the entertainment, which included contributions from Thomas Middleton, John Webster, and Stephen Harrison, was published separately in the same year, as The Magnificent Entertainment Given to King James.

Jonson's text is dominated by a range of mythological figures (Euphrosyne; Plutus; others) and personifications (Agape; Eudaimonia; Eleutheria; Theosophia; Tamesis, for the River Thames; others) reciting the praises of the new monarch. It was performed while James's coronation procession passed through a series of triumphal arches in his Royal Entry to London.

Jonson's first attempt to win royal patronage had not been a success: his play Cynthia's Revels was a failure when acted at Court in 1601, and led to no preferment from Queen Elizabeth. His luck with the new dynasty was much better: Jonson composed several more entertainments in the early Jacobean era, and in 1605 his first masque, The Masque of Blackness, was presented at Whitehall Palace. From that time down to Chloridia in 1631, Jonson was the primary author of masques for the Stuart Court.
