= John Charlewood =

English printer

John Charlewood (died 1593) was an English printer.

== Life ==
He went into business early in Mary's reign in partnership with John Tisdale, in Holborn. He was important as one of the first printers to print Italian works in England – the other being John Wolfe, who printed at roughly the same time as Charlewood.

He was a member of the Grocers' Company until about 1574, though he took out licences to print books. From 1562 to 1593 he printed continuously and issued a very large number of books. His address was the Half-Eagle and Key in the Barbican, and in one of the Marprelate tracts it is stated that as printer to the Earl of Arundel he had a press in the Charterhouse. He was known to be one of the ring-leaders of the gang of printers who printed copies of texts to which they had no rights. His widow married James Roberts, who thus succeeded to the business.

A fictitious foreign imprint of Venice helped the sales in England of a book in a foreign language. Charlewood obviously hoped that this stratagem would provide easier and increased sales for these books, which would allow the printing of a larger and more profitable edition. His hopes were apparently not realised since none of them were reprinted in Italian in Great Britain until modern times.

== Printed works ==
Charlewood printed several books by Italian authors, showing the popularity of the Italian language in England at the time.

Works by Giordano Bruno include: De la causa, principio, et uno (1584), De l'infinito universo et mondi (1584), De gli heroici furori (1585), and Cabala del cauallo Pegaseo (1585). These four works and two others were all published surreptitiously during or immediately following Bruno's visit to Oxford University (their title pages falsely claimed they were printed in Venice or Paris). They were obviously the backlog of works which he had accumulated during his years of wandering and exile.

He also printed Amorous Fiammetta (1587) by Giovanni Boccaccio, of which only 4 copies are known to exist.

== Notes and references ==
- Richeson, below, states that Charlewood died in 1573, but this is probably a mistake.
- A. W. Richeson, The First Arithmetic Printed in English, Isis, Vol. 37, No. 1/2 (May, 1947), pp. 47–56. Published by: The University of Chicago Press on behalf of The History of Science Society. (found here at jstor.org)
- Charles Henry Timperley, A Dictionary of Printers and Printing: with the progress of literature; ancient and modern, H. Johnson (1839).
- Harry Sellers, Italian Books Printed in England before 1640, The Library, 4th Ser., V, 122-28.
- T. Provvidera, ‘John Charlewood, Printer of Giordano Bruno's Italian Dialogues, and His Book Production’, in Giordano Bruno Philosopher of the Renaissance, ed. by H. Gatti, Ashgate, Aldershot (Hampshire), 2002, pp. 167–186.
