= Abigail Baldwin =

English publisher (c. 1658–1713)

- Born: Abigail Mulford c. 1658
- Died: 1713
- Occupation: publisher
- Political party: Whig
- Spouse: Richard Baldwin
- Children: Mary

Abigail Baldwin or Abigail Mulford (c. 1658 – 1713) was an early English publisher. She worked with her husband Richard Baldwin who was summoned frequently to answers charges relating to their publishing business. After her husband died she continued to run the business and she was involved in publishing notable works.

== Life ==
Abigail Mulford was baptised in 1658. She married Richard Baldwin who worked as a bookbinder on 7 December 1676 at St Botolph's church in Aldersgate. They had a child named Mary. He had become one of the many book sellers but they became one of the first publishers. They published short lived newspapers for members of the Whig party.

The Privy Council summoned Richard in 1681 to answer a charge of publishing seditious pamphlets. The next year he/they were accused of publishing libels and his premises near the Old Bailey were searched. The search was by the Stationers Company and they later fined Richard for not co-operating with them.

Richard was summoned to answer a case that he/they had published libels against the prosecution in a case involving the earl of Shaftesbury. Richard was found guilty by the Lord Chief Justice but he was released within a week after promising to behave better. They did not and the Baldwins were frequently in trouble. In 1690 Richard found himself in Newgate Prison for High Treason. Unusually he obtained bail.

When her husband died in 1698 the business was still thriving with Abigail Baldwin as the "A.Baldwin" that appeared on their publications. Their work had never been wholly political and Baldwin published works including the British Merchant of Commerce Preserved and the Female Tatler. The Female Tatler was originally printed by B.Bragge by the author moved it to A.Baldwin.

Abigail published Bernard Mandeville's philosophical work The Grumbling Hive in 1705.

She was the publisher of the British Merchant of Commerce Preserved.

Abigail is said to have published 240 different works. She died in 1713.

== Death and legacy ==
Baldwin's daughter Mary Baldwin had married printer James Roberts, son of master printer Robert Roberts, in 1708, and died the year before her mother. James, who had inherited his father's printing firm, merged the two businesses.
