= Ur-Hamlet =

1580s English play by an unknown author

The Ur-Hamlet (the German prefix Ur- means "original") is a play by an unknown author, thought to be either Thomas Kyd or William Shakespeare, dated by scholars to the late 1580s. No copy of the play survives today. The play was staged in London, more specifically at The Theatre in Shoreditch as recalled by Elizabethan author Thomas Lodge. It includes a character named Hamlet; the only other known character from the play is a ghost who, according to Thomas Lodge in his 1596 publication Wits Misery and the Worlds Madnesse, cries "Hamlet, revenge!"

== Related writings ==
What relation the Ur-Hamlet bears to Shakespeare's more commonly known play Hamlet, written sometime between 1599 and 1601, is unclear: it may contain events supposed to have occurred before Shakespeare's tragedy or it may be an early version of that play; the First Quarto in particular is thought perhaps to have been influenced by the Ur-Hamlet.

== Authorship theories ==
Thomas Nashe, in his introduction to Robert Greene's romance Menaphon (1589), writes in a riddling way that seems to leave clues regarding the identity of playwrights who have left the trade of noverint (lawyer's clerk) to turn to writing, and who are being influenced by the Roman playwright Seneca, who "if you entreat him fair in a frosty morning, he will afford you whole Hamlets..." Nashe then writes that his followers are like the "kid" in Aesop. The reference to "Hamlets" vouches for the idea that a Hamlet-play existed as early as 1589. These references and similarities between Thomas Kyd's The Spanish Tragedy and Shakespeare's Hamlet are interpreted by many scholars as an indication that Kyd, who was a noverint, a Seneca-influenced playwright, and whose surname is the same sound as "kid", might be the author of the Hamlet that Nashe mentions.

Some suggest that the Ur-Hamlet is an early version of Shakespeare's own play, pointing to the survival of Shakespeare's version in three quite different early texts, Q1 (1603), Q2 (1604) and F (1623), and offer the possibility that the play was revised by the author over a period of many years. While the exact relationship of the short and apparently primitive text of Q1 to the later published texts is not resolved, Hardin Craig has suggested that it may represent an earlier draft of the play and hence would confirm that the Ur-Hamlet is in fact merely an earlier draft of Shakespeare's play. This view is held in some form or another by Harold Bloom, Peter Alexander, and Andrew Cairncross, who stated, "It may be assumed, until a new case can be shown to the contrary, that Shakespeare's Hamlet and no other is the play mentioned by Nashe in 1589 and Henslowe in 1594". Harold Jenkins, in his 1982 Arden edition, disagrees with this position.

Eric Sams's The Real Shakespeare argues that Shakespeare might have taken phrases and sometimes, though rarely, whole lines from other playwrights, but not entire theatrical treatments; and would not, at such length, have "plagiarized a known and named colleague [i.e. Kyd], least of all without a word of comment, let alone censure, from any of his critics." Sams analyzes the most detailed account of the Ur-Hamlet, by Nashe in Menaphon in 1589, and sees Nashe's remarks as part of a pattern of jealous attacks upon Shakespeare (and Kyd) by their university-educated rivals. Citing Nashe's reference to "if you entreat him fair in a frosty morning, he will afford you whole Hamlets, I should say handfuls, of tragical speeches," Sams argues that this "manifestly defines the first scene of Hamlet ('tis bitter cold I.i.8)," and evokes the touchy yet voluble Ghost of Hamlet Senior (a role that Shakespeare himself is said to have played). Similarly, Lodge's 1596 reference to the Ur-Hamlet's ghost "who cried so miserably at the Theatre, like an oyster-wife, Hamlet, revenge!" was "surely intended as an affront to the author and actor of that role". Summing up, Sams offers a list of 18 reasons for his belief that the Ur-Hamlet was Shakespeare's earliest version of Hamlet.

In questions regarding Shakespeare as a possible revisor of an earlier version (or versions) of the Hamlet myth – such as the French version of Belleforest, or the Latin version of Saxo Grammaticus (Note: For fuller discussion of Belleforest as a source of Shakespeare's Hamlet see Sources of Hamlet.) – the idea of Shakespeare as translator is often neglected. Margrethe Jolly's 2014 book The First Two Quartos of Hamlet, speaking of the first three printed texts of Hamlet, argued that "the sequence and evidence that the three texts provide suggests that Shakespeare had access to the French source and Q1 when he redrafted".

In 2016, Professor Terri Bourus, one of three general editors of the New Oxford Shakespeare, in her paper "Enter Shakespeare's Young Hamlet, 1589" suggests that Shakespeare was "interested in sixteenth-century French literature, from the very beginning of his career" and therefore "did not need Thomas Kyd to pre-digest Belleforest's histoire of Amleth and spoon-feed it to him". She considers that the hypothesized Ur-Hamlet is Shakespeare's Q1 text, and that this derived directly from Belleforest's French version. Elsewhere Bourus, after referring to Goethe's Ur-Faust or original version of Faust, argues that, "Like Faust […] Hamlet was repeatedly revised by its author. As Faust matured with Goethe, Hamlet matured with Shakespeare. It matters so much to us, in part, because it mattered so much to him."

In 2019, Jennifer E. Nicholson, in her University of Sydney PhD thesis, reinforced this view, offering independent evidence from each of the three printed Hamlets, that Shakespeare was responding creatively to subtle hints in Belleforest's French text, and deriving some of his more famous lines, including perhaps the famous "arras" in the stage directions of Act 3 Scene 4, from them. She too contends that, "There is no need for a 'middle man' author for Ur-Hamlet, and no need for an Ur-Hamlet separate from Shakespeare's own play text."

== Bibliography ==
- Bloom, Harold (1998). Shakespeare: The Invention of the Human. New York: Riverhead. ISBN 1-57322-120-1.
- Edwards, Philip, ed. (1985). Hamlet, Prince of Denmark. The new Cambridge Shakespeare. Cambridge, England: Cambridge University Press. ISBN 0-521-22151-X.
- Jenkins, Harold, ed. (1982). Hamlet, Prince of Denmark. The Arden Shakespeare. London, England: Methuen. ISBN 0-416-17910-X.
- Knutson, Rosyln L. (21 April 2016). "Hamlet". Lost Plays Database.
- Nicholson, Jennifer E. (2019). Shakespeare's French: Reading Hamlet at the Edge of English (PDF) (PhD thesis). University of Sydney.
- Sams, Eric (1997). The Real Shakespeare: Retrieving the Early Years, 1564-1594. New Haven and London: Yale University Press.
