= The Entertainment at Althorp =

Play

The Entertainment at Althorp, or The Althorp Entertainment, performed on 25 June 1603 is an early Jacobean era literary work, written by Ben Jonson. It is also known as A Particular Entertainment of the Queen and Prince, or The Satyr. The work marked a major development in Jonson's career, as the first of many entertainments and masques that he would write for the Stuart Court.

== Staging a welcome ==
The entertainment was designed to welcome the members of the Stuart royal family to England during their progress from Edinburgh to London after the Union of the Crowns. Anne of Denmark and her son Prince Henry came to Althorp, the Northamptonshire estate of Robert Spencer on Sunday 25 June from Dingley. Robert Spencer was created 1st Baron Spencer of Wormleighton less than a month later, on 21 July 1603. The Fairy Queen gave Anne of Denmark a jewel, a "simple gift".

The main speaker is a satyr, yielding the alternative title, in dialogue with Queen Mab, and the cast includes fairies and elves – a blending of figures from both classical and native English folklore that Jonson would employ in future works, including The Fortunate Isles and Their Union of 1625.

Anne of Denmark was praised as "Oriana" in a song, This is she. Queen Mab made reference to Robert Spencer's late wife, Margaret Willoughby, as Thamyra. The heir of Althorp, John Spencer (1590-1610), appeared as a huntsman, fit to join Prince Henry's service. On Monday, the comic figure of Nobody was presented. His torso was concealed by breeches which came up to his neck. Nobody introduced a morris dance and joked about the nearby Holdenby House, which the royals had seen on Saturday. A final speech to the departing queen was not delivered because of the press of the crowds.

The crowd included Lady Anne Clifford who had arrived on Sunday. The royals went on to Easton Neston house.

Jonson's previous attempts to win royal favor during the reign of Elizabeth I had not succeeded. His play Cynthia's Revels was poorly received when acted at Court in 1601. He fared much better in the new reign: he wrote several entertainments in the early Jacobean era, and in 1605 his first Court masque, The Masque of Blackness, was staged at Whitehall Palace. From then till Chloridia in 1631, Jonson was the most regularly employed masque writer for the Stuarts. He produced a major segment of his total literary output for their court, and received a large share of his income from those works.

== Publication ==
Under the title, A Particular Entertainment of the Queen and Prince their Highness at Althorp, the work was entered into the Stationers' Register on 19 March 1604, and was published later that year in a quarto that also included Jonson's The Coronation Triumph. The quarto was printed by Valentine Simmes for the bookseller Edward Blount. The entertainment was reprinted in the first folio collection of Jonson's works in 1616, and was thereafter included in the collected works.
