= John Wolfe (printer) =

English bookseller and printer

John Wolfe (1548? – 1601) was an English bookseller and printer. His considerable ambition (he allegedly compared his attempts to reform the English printing trade to Martin Luther's efforts at reforming Christianity) and his disdain for the printing patent system of Elizabethan England drew the ire of his competitors and authorities in his early career. After being jailed twice and having his printing materials seized, Wolfe transformed himself into an ardent defender of printing privileges. By 1593, he was appointed Printer to the City of London.

== Early career ==
Wolfe may have come from a family in Sussex. For years, scholars wrongly assumed that he was the son of famed printer Reyner Wolfe on the basis of their mutual name and occupation. However, John Wolfe testified that his "poore oulde father" was alive in May 1584, some ten years after Reyner Wolfe died. Because Wolfe was a member of the Fishmongers' Company, there is speculation that a fishmonger named Thomas Wolfe, who resided in the parish of St. Nicholas Cole Abbey, may have been John Wolfe's father, and that John Wolfe entered the Company through patrimony. No conclusive evidence has been found to validate this theory though.

On 25 May 1562, Wolfe entered a ten-year apprenticeship with printer John Day. Because apprenticeships generally ended when the apprentice turned 24 (the minimum age for London freemen), scholars surmise that Wolfe was born around 1548. Wolfe did not stay the full ten years. In the same testimony in which he mentioned his "poore oulde father", he claimed that he served Day for a "space of seaven yeares", the minimum term for an apprenticeship under the Statute of Artificers of 1563.

Some time after his apprenticeship ended, Wolfe travelled to Italy to perfect his trade. By 1576, he was in Florence publishing religious poems. In Gabriel Harvey's 1593 work New Letter of Notable Contents, which was printed by Wolfe, Harvey addresses his printer and "loving friend" as one who "hath read and heard so many gallant Florentine discourses". In 1579, he published his first books in England and became one of the few non-members of the Stationers' Company granted the privilege of entering titles in its Register. An edition of the first book he entered in the Register found its way to the 1581 Frankfurt Book Fair. At least 20 other works of his appear in the catalogues of the annual book fair between 1581 and 1591, which suggests that he may have been a regular attendee. Una essortatione al timor di Dio, an undated book by Italian Jacob Acontius that bears Wolfe's imprint, may have been published abroad sometime between 1579 and 1581, furthering the image of Wolfe as a frequent traveller to Continental Europe. In the work, Wolfe describes himself as a servant of Philip Sidney.

The only other printer of Italian works in England at the time was John Charlewood; both Charlewood and Wolfe had printed works of Giordano Bruno.

== "Machevillian devices" ==
In 1581, Wolfe began entering more works in the Stationers' Register, and the next year, he established a residence in Distaff Lane, southeast of St Paul's Churchyard. He soon found himself in tangles with his competitors. Wolfe aggressively pursued printing opportunities, and he started pirating works whose printing rights belonged to others. On 19 June 1581, the Privy Council reprimanded him and demanded that he halt the printing of Latin grammar books, which were the privilege of Francis Flower. One of his other victims was Queen Elizabeth I's printer, Christopher Barker, who held the exclusive rights to print the Bible, the Book of Common Prayer, and the Royal Statutes and Proclamations. Barker approached Wolfe around Easter 1581 in an attempt to persuade him to stop infringing on his rights. In return, Barker promised to assign Wolfe printing projects with remuneration, provided that Wolfe transfer from the Fishmongers' Company to the Stationers' Company. Despite Barker's assignment of £80 worth of printing, Wolfe did not become a member of the Stationers' Company; moreover, according to Barker, the quality of Wolfe's work for him was so shoddy that the resulting publications reflected "an exceeding discredit to all [of Barker's] labours".

Wolfe continued to print Barker's work after his contract expired. According to entries in the Stationers' Register, on 14 May 1582, Barker confronted Wolfe once more, seeking a negotiated truce. "Wolfe, leave your Machevillian devices, and conceit of your forreine wit," he exhorted, "which you have gained by gadding from countrey to countrey". Wolfe's demands were that upon translation to the Stationers' Company, he would be given a promise of work, a £20 loan, and the right to keep his five apprentices (more than the Company traditionally allowed). Barker found Wolfe to be "a man unreasonable to deale withall", and the meeting terminated with no appreciable result.

Wolfe soon became a leader in the burgeoning movement to overthrow the entire notion of privileged printing. He was imprisoned twice and found himself in legal troubles for his alleged "dangerous and undutifull speaches of her Majesties most gracious government". According to a petition by the Stationers' Company to the Privy Council in early 1583, Wolfe advocated that "it was lawfull for all men to print all lawfull bookes what commandment soever her Majestie gave to the contrary". In May 1583, Wolfe's residence was raided; authorities seized his printing materials and found him to be operating five printing presses, two of them "in a secret vau[l]t".

== Stationers' Company ==
Less than a month after the raid on his premises, Wolfe surrendered to his adversaries. On 11 June 1583, the Court of Aldermen decreed that Wolfe be transferred from the Fishmongers' to the Stationers' Company. The transfer was made official on 1 July; Wolfe, having "accknowledged his error", was "lovingly received into the companie".

Despite this move, Wolfe continued his penchant for piracy, and began pirating Day's lucrative metrical psalters. His former master, on discovering Wolfe's roguery, led a raid on Wolfe's premises and confiscated printing materials. Wolfe challenged the raid in the Court of Star Chamber: on 18 May 1584, he issued a bill of complaint accusing Day of illegally damaging his property. He painted a dramatic picture in his testimony; according to Wolfe, Day's men were "wrestinge his poore oulde father by the throate[,] beatinge and threatnynge his men and spoyled and took awaye wythe them prynted bookes and dyverse other gooddes". Day countered with a demurrer, disputing Wolfe's account. The search, according to Day, was lawful and conducted "in peaceable manner and wise, withoute any weapons at all". The Star Chamber appears to have taken no action, possibly due to Day's demurrer.

Within a month of Wolfe's complaint, Day was dead. His printing patent for the metrical psalter passed to his son, Richard Day. In an effort to make amends, Richard Day appointed Wolfe as one of five assigns to administer the patent. Between 1585 and 1591, Wolfe was the sole printer of metrical psalters for Day. On 23 July 1587, Wolfe was appointed Beadle of the Stationers' Company. Wolfe now found himself in a position of power, and he approached his new role with gusto. While ostensibly, the office of Beadle entailed the maintenance of Stationers' Hall and the summoning of members to company meetings, Wolfe used his title to pursue and stamp out illicit printing. It was a remarkable transformation for a man who had so openly agitated the authorities earlier in the decade. He apparently held no qualms about tracking down his former "confederates". On 16 April 1588, he led a raid on the premises of one of these former colleagues, Robert Waldegrave; the raid and the resulting seizure of Waldegrave's copies of John Udall's State of the Church of Englande earned Wolfe more scorn from contemporaries and yet another comparison with the wily Machiavelli—Martin Marprelate referred to him as "alias Machivill...most tormenting executioner of Waldegrave's goods" in his 1588 work Oh Read Over D. John Bridges, for it is a Worthy Worke. Wolfe soon became an invaluable asset in the Stationers' Company's fight against illegal printing; he served as a legal assistant in several cases the Stationers' brought against other printers.

By 1593, Wolfe had been appointed London's City Printer. Around this time, Wolfe made the transition from printer to publisher, distributing increasing amounts of work for others to print on his behalf. John Windet, who succeeded Wolfe as City Printer, was responsible for most of Wolfe's output after 1593. Wolfe died in early 1601, and on 6 April 1601, Windet was appointed administrator of his estate. Wolfe's widow, Alice, sold many of his copyrights to other stationers.
