= Memorial reconstruction =

Hypothesis concerning some 17th century plays

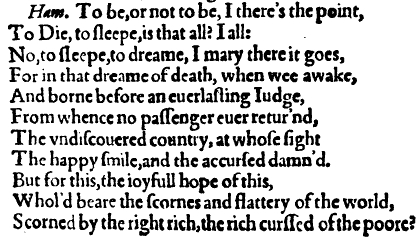
The "To be, or not to be" soliloquy from the 1603 quarto of Hamlet

Memorial reconstruction is the hypothesis that the scripts of some 17th century plays were written down from memory by actors who had played parts in them, and that those transcriptions were published. The theory is suggested as an explanation for the so-called "bad quarto" versions of plays, in which the texts differ dramatically from later published versions, or appear to be corrupted or confused.

The theory however is facing growing criticism by a number of scholars for being overly applied, and for being an elaborate theory, yet with little evidence to support it.

In 1623, the preface to the First Folio of Shakespeare's works specifically marketed its content as correct, in contrast to the garbled texts of "stolen and surreptitious copies" published previously. Memorial reconstruction has been supposed to be one of the ways in which texts were "stolen". Examples of possible memorial reconstructions are early editions of Shakespeare, including the second quarto (1598) of Richard III and the 1603 first quarto of Hamlet. It has been theorized that the only version to survive of Christopher Marlowe's The Massacre at Paris is a text obtained in this way, although there is no persuasive evidence to support this assertion.

The theory has been used to explain the content of some quartos, and also to suggest identities of the actors responsible, on the assumption that they would get their own parts right, along with cue-lines and possibly other lines performed when they were onstage, but would most likely make more errors when reconstructing scenes in which their character was not present. The cast members of an Elizabethan dramatic production had their own parts written out for them, with relevant entrances and cues, but they did not have their own individual copies of the play text as a whole.

The theory has, however, been criticised on various grounds; that it is not based on serious research into the way actors actually remember or misremember lines; that texts may have been "stolen" by other means; and that the so-called "bad" quartos are early or alternative versions of plays that were later revised.

== Theory ==
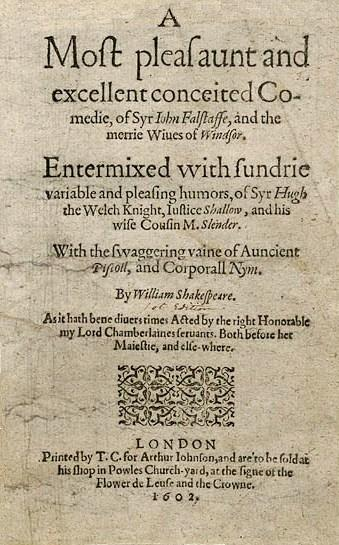
The "bad" quarto of The Merry Wives of Windsor, the first text analysed by using the method.

The theory first appeared during the 19th century, and it was more fully defined by W. W. Greg in 1909, when he analysed the quarto text of The Merry Wives of Windsor by systematically comparing the divergences from the Folio version. He concluded that scenes with the character of the Host are much closer to the Folio version than the other scenes are. He therefore deduced that the actor playing the Host had played a significant role in creating the text of the quarto publication. In 1915, Henry David Gray analysed the first quarto of Hamlet using the same method. He concluded that the actor who played Marcellus was responsible for the reconstruction. He explained the fact that the "mousetrap" scene in which Marcellus does not appear was also accurate by suggesting that the same actor must have also played one of the roles in that scene.

Both Gray and Greg argued that hired actors playing minor roles would be more susceptible to bribery, as they had much less to lose, than established actors in the company. They also suggested that an anonymous writer filled out the missing verses.

The theory became popular and was used to explain the textual oddities of many Elizabethan and Jacobean plays. There was debate about which plays may have been surreptitiously recorded by shorthand during a performance, which by memorial reconstruction and which by a combination of the two. Shakespeare's contemporary Thomas Heywood appeared to complain about the former practice when he attacked "mangled" versions of his works "copied only by the ear".

The shorthand method would be unlikely to involve major differences in accuracy from one scene to the next. John Dover Wilson, for example, argued that the Hamlet bad quarto was mainly based on a transcript but with additions from the actor playing Marcellus. There was much discussion of the first quarto of King Lear, leading to the conclusion by some that it was based on a transcript and not an actor's memory, as divergences from the Folio version appeared consistently throughout and were not bunched by scene.

== Criticism ==
Critics have argued that memorial reconstruction is not as prevalent as has been presumed (some use the term "memorial reconstruction" loosely to refer to both the supposed methods of illicit reconstruction from both actors and auditors). In 1975, Michael Warren argued that the quarto version of King Lear is not a "bad" text but that the later Folio version differed because it was a revised version. Later scholars such as James S. Shapiro have developed the argument.

Likewise, it has been argued that the quarto of Romeo and Juliet was printed from a reduced and simplified version, designed for provincial productions. The argument has also been made for the published version of Marlowe's Massacre at Paris, and the first quarto of Hamlet.

In 1996, Laurie Maguire of the Department of English at the University of Ottawa published a study of the concept of memorial reconstruction, based on the analysis of errors made by actors taking part in the BBC TV Shakespeare series, broadcast in the early 1980s. She found that actors typically add, drop or invert single words. However, the larger-scale errors, which would be expected if actors were attempting to piece together the plays some time after their performance, failed to appear in most of the bad quartos. The study, however, uncovered some circumstantial evidence for memorial reconstruction in the bad quartos of Hamlet, The Merry Wives of Windsor and Pericles. According to Maguire, virtually all the bad quartos appear to be accurate renditions of original texts that "merit our attention as valid texts in their own right".

The concept of memorial reconstruction has since been questioned by other scholars. In Shakespeare: An Anthology of Criticism and Theory, 1945-2000, Paul Werstine asserts that the theory has "yet to be empirically validated with reference to any extant Shakespeare quarto" and that "there is no documentary evidence that any actor ever memorially reconstructed a play".

Alberty Freillerat, in The Composition of Shakespeare’s Plays, suggests that "it is odd that all actor-reporters should make similar mistakes and report inconsistently" and he concludes that the theory of memorial reconstruction is "as disappointing as that of stenographic reconstruction".
