= Richard Baldwin (publisher) =

British publisher (c. 1653–1698)

- Born: c. 1653
- Died: 1698
- Occupation: Publisher
- Spouse: Abigail Baldwin
- Children: Mary

Richard Baldwin (c. 1653 – 1698) was an English printer accused of seditious work. He worked closely with Abigail Baldwin who was his wife.

== Life ==
Richard was possibly born in Wycombe, Buckinghamshire. He worked as a bookbinder and married Abigail Mulford in 1676 at St Botolph, Aldersgate. He became one of the many book sellers but he became one of the first publishers. He published short lived newspapers for members of the Whig party.

The Privy Council summoned him in 1681 to answer a charge of publishing seditious pamphlets. The next year he was accused of publishing libels and his premises near the Old Bailey were searched. The search was by the Stationers Company and they later fined him for not co-operating with them.

He was summoned to answer a case that he had published libels against the prosecution in a case involving the earl of Shaftesbury. He was found guilty by the Lord Chief Justice but he was released within a week after promising to behave better. He did not and the Baldwins were frequently in trouble. In 1690 he found himself in Newgate Prison for High Treason. Unusually he obtained bail.

== Death and legacy ==
When he died the business was still operating with Abigail Baldwin as the "A.Baldwin" that appeared on their publications. Their work had never been wholly political and Baldwin published works until she died in 1713. She was the publisher of the Tatler that featured work under the pseudonym of Bickerstaff by Jonathon Swift and Joseph Addison.

Her son-in-law, Roberts, continued to operate the business.
