= George Russell French =

19th-century English antiquarian

George Russell French (1803–1881), antiquary, was born in London in 1803.

After being privately educated he became an architect, and was for many years surveyor and architect to the Ironmongers' Company. French was an accomplished scholar, and devoted his leisure to antiquarian researches. He was long an active member of the council, and subsequently one of the vice-presidents, of the London and Middlesex Archæological Society. In 1841 French published an elaborate account of the ancestries of Queen Victoria and of the Prince Consort; and in 1847 his Address delivered on the sixth anniversary of the College of the Freemasons of the Church. He next traced the royal descent of Nelson and Wellington from Edward I, king of England, and published in 1853 the tables of pedigree and genealogical memoirs in connection therewith. In 1861–9 he prepared and issued a Catalogue of the Antiquities and Works of Art exhibited at Ironmongers' Hall. French published in two parts the result of a careful series of Shakespearean investigations, under the title of Shakespeareana Genealogica (1869). The first part consisted of an identification of the dramatis personae in Shakespeare's historical plays, from King John to Henry VIII, accompanied with observations on characters in Macbeth and Hamlet, and notes on persons and places belonging to Warwickshire alluded to in several plays. The second part consisted of a dissertation on the Shakespeare and Arden families and their connections, with tables of descent. French, who was a temperance reformer, published in 1879 a work entitled Temperance or Abstinence, in which he discussed the question from the scriptural point of view. French died in London on 14 October 1881 after a long and painful illness, and was interred at the Willesden Cemetery.

George died unmarried. His brother Major John French b. 1804, m. 1846 (6 children), d. 1859. His sister Clara Ann French b. 1807, d. 1896, unmarried.

== Sources ==
- Erben, Michael (2004). "French, George Russell (1803–1881), genealogist and architect". Oxford Dictionary of National Biography (online ed.). Oxford University Press. doi:10.1093/ref:odnb/10162. (Subscription or UK public library membership required.)
