= Andrew Scott Cairncross =

20th-century Scottish professor of English literature and Shakespeare expert

Andrew Scott Cairncross (25 March 1901 – 17 December 1975) was a Scottish-American scholar of Shakespeare and the English literary renaissance.

Cairncross is best known for his 1936 book The Problem of Hamlet (London: MacMillan), which makes a number of controversial arguments about Hamlet — arguing, for example, that the play was written around 1588–89 (rather than twelve years later, as most scholars insist), and that the so-called Ur-Hamlet, to which frequent allusion occurs starting in 1589, is actually an early draft of Shakespeare's play.

Cairncross was born in Lesmahagow, Scotland, to Andrew Cairncross and Margaret Matin. He earned his M.A. and D.Litt. (1932) from the University of Glasgow and worked as a schoolteacher and headmaster in his native Lanarkshire until retiring in 1961. He immigrated to the United States in 1963 at the invitation of Hardin–Simmons University, and within a year was a visiting professor at the University of Texas at El Paso. In 1964, he finished a three-volume work on Henry VI, published by Harvard University Press.

He was a visiting professor at Baylor University in the spring of 1974. He died in Bryan, Texas in 1975.

== Sources ==
- Matus, Irvin Leigh (2013). Shakespeare, In Fact. Courier Corporation. ISBN 9780486320793.
