= James Roberts (printer) =

James Roberts (fl. 1564–1606), was an English printer who printed many important works of Elizabethan literature. F. G. Fleay says that "he seems to have been given to piracy and invasion of copyright".

== Career ==
Roberts was made free of the Company of Stationers on 27 June 1564, and on 24 June 1567 began to take apprentices. The first entry to him is for An almanacke and pronostication of Master Roberte Moore, 1570. He was one of several who petitioned the company for pardon on 27 January 1577–8, after having presented certain complaints. With R. Watkins he had a patent for almanacs and prognostications for twenty-one years from 12 May 1588. This patent lasted to the end of the reign of Elizabeth. James I granted for ever the right to the Stationers' Company from 29 October 1603. Roberts took over John Charlewood's books on 31 May 1594, including the right of printing playbills, which William Jaggard unsuccessfully applied for.

About 1595 Roberts probably married Charlewood's widow, Alice. He was presumably later widowered, as he is also said to have married a daughter of the stationer Thomas Heyes, to whom he sold the publishing rights of The Merchant of Venice on 28 October 1600. The court of assistants ordered, on 1 September 1595, "that James Roberts shall clerely from hensforth surcease to deale with the printinge of the Brief Catechisme", recently printed by him, and that he should deliver up all sheets of the book. On 25 June 1596 he was admitted into the livery.

Roberts continued to print Charlewood's catalogue of poetry for a variety of publishers including works by Henry Constable, Samuel Daniel, Michael Drayton, and Philip Sidney's Apologie for Poetrie (1595), as well as the collection England's Helicon (1600). He printed satires: Thomas Nashe's Christ's Tears over Jerusalem (1594), John Marston's Scourge of Villainy (1598), and Everard Guilpin's Skialatheia (1598). He also continued to print playbills for The Lord Chamberlain's Men (Shakespeare's company), he registered five plays belonging to the company but never published any of them himself: The Merchant of Venice (1598), A Larum for London (1600), and Troilus and Cressida (1603). He also entered a lost play Cloth Breeches and Velvet Hose and printed the second quarto of Shakespeare's Titus Andronicus for Edward White.

== Plays ==
"A booke of the Marchaunt of Venyce, or otherwise called the Jewe of Venyce", was entered to him on 22 July 1598 (Arber, Transcript of the Registers, iii. 122), and he printed the first edition of the play in 1600. He also issued the first editions of A Midsummer Night's Dream and Titus Andronicus in the same year. He paid a fine on 26 March 1602 for not serving the rentership. On 26 July 1602 he had entered to him The Revenge of Hamlett, Prince of Denmarke, as yt was latelie acted by the Lord Chamberleyne his servantes’. The first edition was printed by N. Ling in 1603; the second and third impressions were printed by Roberts for Ling in 1604 and 1605. One other Shakespearean entry to him is for Troilus and Cressida, "as yt is acted by my lord chamberlen's Men", 7 Feb. 1603, of which the first printed edition came from the press of G. Eld in 1609. The last entry is on 10 July 1606 (Arber, Transcript of the Registers, iii. 326). The playbills and some books were transferred to William Jaggard on 29 October 1615 (Arber, Transcript of the Registers, iii. 575).

== Personal details ==
A long list of books belonging to Roberts towards the end of his life is reprinted in Joseph Ames, Typographical Antiquities (ed. William Herbert, ii. 1031–1032). Roberts first lived in St. Paul's Churchyard, London, at the sign of the Sun; he afterwards had a house in the Barbican.

== Legacy ==
He printed down to 1606. James Roberts business was continued by his brother Robert Roberts. He married Mary Balwin who was the daughter of Abigail Baldwin who was a successful publisher. Abigail died in 17?? and although Mary had died the year before, Robert Roberts inherited the Baldwin's business. He combined the two businesses but continued to trade as "James Roberts".
