= John Trundle =

English publisher & book seller (1575–1629)

John Trundle (1575–1629) was a London publisher and bookseller.

Trundle was born in Chipping Barnet, Herefordshire, but moved to London when regulations issued by the Star Chamber restricted printing to London, Oxford and Cambridge. He served an apprenticeship with Ralph Hancock a member of the Stationers' Livery Company. After he had completed his apprenticeship in 1597, Trundle set up his own business.

Trundle published A Miracle of Miracles in 1614 which consists of various accounts of wondrous events happening in Somerset. It uses the same style and some places the same wording as other wonder books which comprised a widespread genre during the rise of puritanism in London.
