= Internet Shakespeare Editions =

Open-access, peer-reviewed, scholarly Shakespeare resource website

- Website type: Text compendium
- Available in: English
- Founder: Michael Best
- Website: https://internetshakespeare.uvic.ca

The Internet Shakespeare Editions is a non-profit organization that produces a website devoted to William Shakespeare and his works. The organization is an associate member of the Shakespeare Theatre Association of America, under the classification of theatre service provider, and is supported by the University of Victoria and the Social Sciences and Humanities Research Council of Canada.

The website includes a variety of Shakespeare-related resources, including fully annotated texts of his plays and poems, multimedia materials and records of his plays in performance, and historical information about Shakespeare's life and the Renaissance.

== History ==
The project began on a floppy disc in 1988, which creator Michael Best called Shakespeare's Life and Times. In 1994 he transferred it to CD-ROM. By 1996, Best decided that the Internet was the ideal medium for his Shakespeare project. He translated his earlier formats into a web format and formally founded the Internet Shakespeare Editions in 1999.

In 2010, the freely accessible site was redesigned to include advertisements.

In addition to the website, the Internet Shakespeare Editions also published a CD-ROM titled A Shakespeare Suite. The CD-ROM, published in 2002 and distributed by Insight Media, is a companion tool for Shakespeare studies designed for teachers and students.

== Editing and publishing ==
The ISE's academic development is overseen by an Editorial Board of 23 members from universities in Canada, the United States, the United Kingdom, and Germany. In addition to featuring searchable texts and facsimiles of the folios and quartos, the website is a venue for Shakespeare scholars to publish their fully edited and annotated texts. Existing peer-reviewed publications include:

- As You Like It, edited by David Bevington;
- Cymbeline, edited by Jennifer Forsyth;
- Henry IV, Part One, edited by Rosemary Gaby;
- Julius Caesar, edited by John D. Cox;
- Romeo and Juliet, edited by Roger Apfelbaum;
- The Tempest, edited by Brent Whitted and Paul Yachnin;
- Troilus and Cressida, edited by William Godshalk and Anthony Colianne; and
- Venus and Adonis, edited by Hardy M. Cook.

Additional modern texts, complete with annotations and collations, have been published but have not yet been peer reviewed.

The ISE also publishes editions of plays written for the Queen's Men, many of which influenced Shakespeare. These plays are prepared for the project Shakespeare and the Queen's Men, based out of McMaster University and the University of Toronto.

== Theater ==
The Internet Shakespeare Editions' database of Shakespeare in Performance is a searchable archive of information and materials related to performances of Shakespeare's plays. There are thousands of digitized artifacts—images, audio clips, and videos—currently available for public viewing on the site, as well as cast and crew lists for hundreds of films and live performances. The database is overseen by a board of actors, directors, and academics.

In winter 2007, the ISE launched its Performance Chronicle. The Performance Chronicle is a searchable blog-style database of reviews of contemporary Shakespearean productions, written by the general public and scholars. It also includes reviews from scholarly journals, such as Cahiers Élizabéthains, Shakespeare Bulletin, and Early Modern Literary Studies.
