= Hardin Craig =

American Renaissance scholar

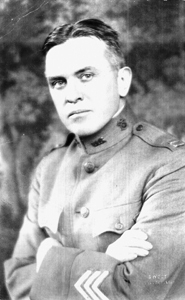
Hardin Craig, photograph taken at the end of World War I in U.S. Army uniform

Hardin Craig (29 June 1875 – 13 October 1968) was an American Renaissance scholar and professor of English. In his 65-year academic career, he served on the faculties of eight different colleges and universities, published more than 20 books as either author or editor, and was one of the few Americans to be elected to the Royal Society of Literature in Britain.

== Life ==
Craig was born on a farm near Owensboro, Kentucky, to Robert and Mary Jane Craig, nee McHenry. He earned his A.B. from Centre College 1897, and served as principal at Stanford Academy in Kentucky for one year. He began graduate study in 1898 at Princeton University under Thomas Marc Parrott, and took his M.A. in 1899 and his Ph.D. in 1901. During two summers he studied with John Matthews Manly at the University of Chicago, and studied at Exeter College, Oxford, from 1901 to 1903. He returned to Princeton as an English instructor from 1903-1905, where he became one of Woodrow Wilson's first group of Edgerstoune School preceptors from 1905 to 1910. From 1910 to 1919 he was a professor of English at the University of Minnesota. While there he took military leave for two years to serve in the Army as a second lieutenant in World War I.

In 1919 Craig joined the English Department faculty at the University of Iowa, and the following year he was made head of the department. While there in 1922 he founded the Philological Quarterly. In 1928 he left Iowa to go to Stanford University. He retired as Professor of English Emeritus at Stanford in 1942 at the age of 67, and then went to the University of North Carolina at Chapel Hill as visiting professor until 1949, at which time he accepted an appointment as visiting professor of English at the University of Missouri in Columbia, serving until his third retirement in 1960. He became Scholar-in-Residence at Stephens College and then at Centre College until 1967, thus completing 65 years of teaching.

Craig was a member of the executive committee of the Modern Language Association of America. He was considered to be an authority on Shakespeare and Milton. He was the recipient of two festschrifts, the first, Renaissance Studies in Honor of Hardin Craig, at the occasion of his retirement from Stanford University, and another, Essays on Shakespeare and Elizabethan Drama in Honor of Hardin Craig in 1960 to commemorate his third retirement, from the University of Missouri.

He died in Houston in 1968 at the age of 93.

== Selected works ==
- Two Coventry Corpus Christi Plays (1902)
- The Tragedy of Richard the Second (1912), editor
- A History of English Literature II: Literature of the English Renaissance (1962)
- Shakespeare: Historical and Critical Study With Annotated Texts of Twenty-One Plays (1931)
- Great English Prose Writers (1932)
- Essays in Dramatic Literature: The Parrott Presentation Volume (1935), editor
- Edgar Allan Poe: Representative Selections, with Introduction, Bibliography, and Notes (1935), begun by Margaret Alterton and completed by Hardin Craig
- The Enchanted Glass: The Elizabethan Mind in Literature (1936)
- Literature Study and the Scholarly Profession (1944)
- An Interpretation of Shakespeare (1948)
- Freedom and Renaissance (1949)
- A History of English Literature (1950)
- The Complete Works of Shakespeare (1951)
- The Written Word, and Other Essays: Lectures Delivered before the Centre College of Kentucky (1953)
- English Religious Drama of the Middle Ages (1955)
- Woodrow Wilson at Princeton (1960).
- New Lamps for Old: A Sequel to The Enchanted Glass (1960)
- A New Look at Shakespeare's Quartos (1961)
