= British Library, MS Egerton 1994 =

Collection of English Renaissance plays housed in the British Library

Egerton MS 1994 is a manuscript collection of English Renaissance plays, now in the Egerton Collection of the British Library. Probably prepared by the actor William Cartwright around 1642, and later presented by him to Dulwich College, the collection contains unique copies of several Elizabethan, Jacobean, and Caroline dramas, including significant works like Edmund Ironside and Thomas of Woodstock.

The collection contains fourteen plays and an anonymous masque:

- The Elder Brother, by John Fletcher and Philip Massinger — folios 2–29
- Dick of Devonshire, attributed to Robert Davenport or Thomas Heywood — ff. 30–51
- The Captives, by Thomas Heywood — ff. 52–73
- The Escapes of Jupiter, by Thomas Heywood — ff. 74–95
- Edmund Ironside — ff. 96–118
- Charlemagne — ff. 119–35
- The Fatal Marriage or A Second Lucretia — ff. 136–60
- Thomas of Woodstock — ff. 161–85
- The Lady Mother, by Henry Glapthorne — ff. 186–211
- A masque — ff. 212–23
- The Two Noble Ladies and the Converted Conjurer — ff. 224–44
- Nero — ff. 245–67
- The Poor Man's Comfort, by Robert Daborne — ff. 268–92
- Love's Changelings' Change — ff. 293–316
- The Launching of the Mary, attributed to Walter Mountfort — ff. 317–49.

Thomas of Woodstock was one of Shakespeare's sources for his Richard II, and Edmund Ironside has been attributed to Shakespeare by some commentators.

Some of the plays, like The Two Noble Ladies and the two Heywood works, are judged to be autograph scripts, in the handwriting of the authors. (The Escapes of Jupiter consists of excerpts from Heywood's The Golden Age and The Silver Age.) The untitled masque in the collection has strong commonalities with the work of George Chapman; it borrows a long passage from The Tragedy of Byron, suggesting Chapman influence rather than authorship.

The Launching of the Mary is a "first draft, written at different times, with different inks, and on different paper." The play was written at sea but subsequently supplied to a professional playing company when its author, Walter Mountfort, had returned to London.

The anonymous works in the collection have been the subject of attribution studies, and disagreements. Dick of Devonshire has been assigned to Davenport, but also to Heywood.
