= Patricia Davies =

Patricia Davies may refer to:

- Patricia Davies (codebreaker) (born 1923), British codebreaker
- Patricia Davies (engineer), British-American mechanical and acoustical engineer
- Patricia Davies (field hockey) (born 1956), Zimbabwean hockey player

== See also ==
- Pat Davies (disambiguation)
