= Michael Egan (author) =

American academic and writer

- Awards: Adèle Mellen Prize (2006)

Academic background
- Education: Cambridge University

Academic work
- Discipline: Literature
- Institutions: Brigham Young University; TransPacific Hawaii College

Michael Egan (born 1941) is an American literary scholar and author. Egan was Scholar in Residence at Brigham Young University, Hawai’i and Professor of English and Political Science at TransPacific Hawaii College, Honolulu (which closed at the end of 2008). He earned his Ph.D. at Cambridge University, where he edited The Cambridge Review and was first Contributing Literary Editor for the Times Higher Education Supplement.

== Thomas of Woodstock attribution ==
Egan edited a variorum edition of The First Part of the Tragedy of King Richard the Second: A Newly Authenticated Play by William Shakespeare, with an introduction, notes and critical commentary (Edwin Mellen Press, 2006). which was awarded the 2006 Adèle Mellen Prize. Egan's thesis that Shakespeare wrote the play, also known as Thomas of Woodstock, was examined by three independent Shakespeare scholars, who unanimously agreed that "In sum, the differences, stylistic and otherwise, between Woodstock and Shakespeare's undoubted plays, even his early ones, so vastly outweigh the perceived similarities as to compel the conclusion that Shakespeare did not write Woodstock."

== Publications ==
Egan is the author of more than 80 professional articles and ten books, including:

- Henrik Ibsen: The Critical Heritage (Routledge and Kegan Paul, 1972, Taylor & Francis, 2000)
- Extreme Situations: Literature and Crisis from the Great War to the Atom Bomb (Macmillan, 1979) [with David Craig]
- Huckleberry Finn: Race, Class and Society (Sussex University Press, 1977)
- Henry James: The Ibsen Years (Vision Press, 1972)
