= Thomas of Woodstock (play) =

Play attributed by some to Shakespeare

Thomas of Woodstock and Richard the Second Part One are two names for an untitled, anonymous and apparently incomplete manuscript of an Elizabethan play depicting events in the reign of King Richard II. Attributions of the play to William Shakespeare have been nearly universally rejected, and it does not appear in major editions of the Shakespeare apocrypha. The play has been often cited as a possible influence on Shakespeare's Richard II, as well as Henry IV, Part 1 and Part 2, but new dating of the text brings that relationship into question.

== Characters ==
Dramatis Personae after Corbin and Sedge (2002)

- Thomas of Woodstock, Duke of Gloucester – uncle to the king and Lord Protector
- John of Gaunt, 1st Duke of Lancaster –uncle to the king
- Edmund of Langley, 1st Duke of York – uncle to the king
- Richard FitzAlan, 11th Earl of Arundel, Lord Admiral of England
- Earl of Surrey (possibly Thomas Holland, 1st Duke of Surrey)
- Sir Thomas Cheney, supporter of Woodstock and his brothers
- Nicholas Exton, Lord Mayor of London
- King Richard II of England
- Sir Henry Greene – favourite of Richard
- Sir Edward Bagot – favourite of Richard and Sheriff of Leicester
- Sir William Bushy – favourite of Richard, Sheriff of Lincoln, Speaker of the House of Commons
- Sir Thomas Scroop – favourite of Richard, Earl of Wiltshire, Treasurer of England
- Sir Robert Tresilian, a lawyer, subsequently Lord Chief Justice of England
- Nimble, his man
- A Servant to Tresilian
- Crosby, law officer to Tresilian
- Fleming, law officer to Tresilian
- Master Ignorance, the Baily of Dunstable
- A Farmer
- A Butcher
- Cowtail, a grazier
- A Schoolmaster
- A Serving-man
- A Whistler
- A Servant at Plashy House
- A Spruce Courtier
- His Horse
- Cynthia, prologue to the masque representing the Moon
- The Shrieve of Kent
- The Shrieve of Northumberland
- Lapoole, Governor of Calais
- Ghost of Edward the Black Prince
- Ghost of Edward III of England
- 1 Murderer
- 2 Murderer
- A Gentleman
- Soldiers of the Calais garrison
- Queen Anne O'Beame, Queen of England
- Eleanor de Bohun, Duchess of Gloucester, wife of Thomas of Woodstock
- Philippa de Coucy, Duchess of Ireland, widow of Robert de Vere, the King's former favourite
- A Maid-in-waiting to the Queen
- Courtiers, Masquers, Gentlemen, Servants, Maids, Soldiers, Archers

== Text and origins ==
The play survives only as an anonymous, untitled and incomplete manuscript, part of a collection of fifteen plays in the British Library catalogued as MS. Egerton 1994. The collection was discovered by James Halliwell-Phillipps, and also includes Edmund Ironside, another play whose authorship has been attributed by some scholars to William Shakespeare.

The collection was compiled by a seventeenth century actor in the King's Revels Men, William Cartwright (ca. 1606–1686; not to be confused with his contemporary poet/dramatist of the same name), who later became a bookseller and collector of plays during the English Civil War.

There is no confirmed recorded production of the play during Shakespeare's lifetime, although the well-worn state of the Egerton manuscript, the presence of notations referencing specific actors' names, and the inclusion of instructions within the text's margins suggesting censorship by the Master of Revels all suggest that the play enjoyed heavy use even during the Jacobean period. Significantly, it is not known which acting company owned or performed the play.

A transcript of the text was published by the Malone Society in 1929, and in fully edited texts by A. P. Rossiter in 1946, Peter Corbin and Douglas Sedge in 2002, and Michael Egan in 2003.

== Title and subject matter ==
The play covers the events leading up to the murder of Richard II's uncle, Thomas of Woodstock, 1st Duke of Gloucester, in 1397. The manuscript has no title. Most scholars and theatre companies who have worked on the play call it Thomas of Woodstock or Woodstock, but some entitle it Richard II, Part One, either as the main title or as a sub-title. Those who elect to call it Richard II, Part One or by similar titles do so because the play describes events immediately prior to Shakespeare's Richard II and provides context for the behaviour of many of Shakespeare's characters. However, this title has been criticised as "going too far", because it makes the play's relationship to Shakespeare's play seem definitive when it is only speculative. Moreover, events depicted in Woodstock are covered as well in Richard II (such as the farming out of the kingdom and the death of Green), so that play cannot be a sequel in the ordinary meaning of the term. A.P. Rossiter, who edited the play, preferred the title Woodstock since Woodstock is the play's protagonist, not Richard. Corbin and Sedge argue that Shakespeare was familiar with the play, drew inspiration from it (especially in King Lear, particularly in the quarto version), and expected audiences to be familiar with it in Richard II, noting that many modern productions reverse the first two scenes to give the audience a better understanding of the events that occurred before the play opens.

== Authorship ==
Given the play's close relationship to the subject matter of Richard II, Shakespeare's authorship has been suggested, although few of the play's earlier editors supported this speculation. The Malone Society editor makes no reference to the Shakespeare theory. A.P. Rossiter states "There is not the smallest chance that he was Shakespeare", citing the drabness of the verse, while acknowledging that the play's aspirations indicate that "There is something of a simplified Shakespeare" in the author.

Other authors have been suggested. In 2001, MacDonald P. Jackson used stylistic analysis to propose Samuel Rowley as the possible author.

Corbin and Sedge argue that Thomas of Woodstock was written by an author of "considerable range and competence", but they regard any attribution to Shakespeare "or any other author" as "highly speculative". Nonetheless, they note that:

Shakespeare is perhaps the one known dramatist in the 1590s whose dramatic style most closely resembles that of Thomas of Woodstock. The 'Shakespearian' characteristics of the play may be summarised as follows: a sophisticated handling of chronicle material; a careful and fruitful juxtaposition of low life scenes over and against court life; the sense of England as a significant 'character' throughout the play; a sure handling of dramatic technique as in the economical and engaging exposition; the careful drawing of effective female characters (specifically Anne O' Beame [i.e. Anne of Bohemia]); Nimble's malapropisms, anticipating Costard, Dogberry and Mrs. Quickley; the dramatist's ability to manipulate audience sympathy in a complex fashion towards Richard and to present Woodstock as a figure of conscience in a manner which anticipates Gaunt.

In 2006, Michael Egan offered a case for Shakespeare's authorship of the play in a four volume (2,100-page) variorum edition, which includes a book-length authorship analysis. His evidence consists for the most part in what he suggests are thousands of verbal parallels. Egan claimed that Ian Robinson supported the attribution of the play to Shakespeare in a 1988 publication, Richard II and Woodstock, but he cited no other adherents to this view. Ward Elliott reported that he had performed stylometric analysis on the manuscript's text, which he claimed discounts Egan's attribution. In a review of Egan's treatise for the Times Literary Supplement, Bart Van Es also challenged Egan's attribution, arguing that the verbal links that he had found were often tenuous. Egan wagered £1,000 that he could prove "by clear, convincing and irrefutable evidence" that Shakespeare wrote the play. In 2011, a panel of three independent Shakespeare scholars concluded that he had not done so, and that the play was not Shakespearean. Eric Sams, in an appendix on Woodstock planned for the second volume of his The Real Shakespeare (2008), also presented linguistic and circumstantial arguments for Shakespeare's authorship of "this powerful drama".

An argument against Shakespeare's authorship is the fact that the character of Sir Henry Green is killed fighting in Act V of Thomas of Woodstock, yet is alive again at the beginning of Richard II until his execution is ordered by Bolingbroke in Act III. There is no instance of a character dying twice in the validated works of Shakespeare. There are, however, inconsistencies in Shakespeare, such as the claim at the end of Henry IV, Part 2 that Falstaff will be seen again in Henry V, a promise that is not kept. Furthermore, the character of Falstaff is arguably a different one in the history plays than the character encountered in The Merry Wives of Windsor, not to mention the apparent setting of that play in Renaissance England rather than Prince Hal's time.

== Date ==
The 1929 Malone Society editor states that most scholars place its composition between 1591 and 1595. Ule and Baker date it more precisely to about 1582; they believe it was written by Christopher Marlowe while he was at Cambridge, shortly after he had completed other plays they attribute to him such as Timon, and The Famous Victories of Henry V. Corbin and Sedge, while cautioning that "[d]ating by suppositions of literary or theatrical influence is ... a hazardous business," nonetheless state that "in so far as literary influence may help dating, it would seem probable that Woodstock was written, and perhaps staged, some time before 1595." Egan dates the play to 1592–1593, while dating the manuscript to 1605. MacDonald P. Jackson argues that "Woodstock's contractions and linguistic forms, expletives, metrical features and vocabulary all point independently to composition in the first decade of the seventeenth century", a conclusion which would make the play's relationship with Richard II that of a "prequel" rather than a source. Eric Sams (2008) conjectured c.1590 as its original composition date, placing it after The First Part of the Contention, which he considered to be by the same author and a major influence on its language, content and treatment.

== Performances ==
The Hampshire Shakespeare Company, a non-professional theatre in Amherst, Massachusetts, staged the first known American production of Thomas of Woodstock in 1999. Local writer Frederick Carrigg supplied an ending to cover the missing manuscript page(s).

Royal Blood: The Rise and Fall of Kings was a 10-play series of Shakespeare's history plays staged chronologically over four seasons by the Pacific Repertory Theatre from 2001 to 2004, which included the American professional premieres of both Edward III and Thomas of Woodstock. They proposed Shakespeare as the author of both plays in their first arc in 2001, consisting of Edward III, Thomas of Woodstock, and Richard II.

The Shakespeare Theatre in Washington, D.C., staged Richard II in 2010 with director Michael Kahn's incorporation of a significant part of Thomas of Woodstock at the start of the play.

On 20 December 2013 the Royal Shakespeare Company gave a rehearsed reading of the play at London's Barbican Centre in the context of its ongoing performances of Richard II. The text was significantly cut by the director (for example the subplot involving Nimble and the blank charters was excised) to highlight the relationship between the two plays.

In 2020, the Beyond Shakespeare Company released online a play-reading and discussion of Thomas of Woodstock on YouTube.
