= Pat Davies =

Pat Davies may refer to:

- Pat Davies (rugby union) (1903–1979), English rugby union player
- Pat Davies (codebreaker) (born 1923), English codebreaker
- Pat Davies (footballer) (born c. 1955), English women's footballer
- Pat Davies (bridge player), English bridge player

== See also ==
- Patricia Davies (disambiguation)
- Pat Davis (born c. 1956), American dancer
