= Eric Sams =

20th/21st-century British musicologist and Shakespeare scholar

- Born: 3 May 1926; London
- Died: 13 September 2004 (aged 78); London
- Education: Corpus Christi College, Cambridge
- Occupations: Musicologist and literary scholar
- Writing career
- Notable works: The Songs of Hugo Wolf (1961, 1983), The Songs of Robert Schumann (1969, 1993), The Real Shakespeare: Retrieving the Early years, 1564–1594 (1995)

Eric Sams (3 May 1926 – 13 September 2004) was a British musicologist and Shakespeare scholar.

== Life ==
Born in London, Sams was raised in Essex. He studied at the Westcliff High School for Boys, where he performed well and earned a scholarship to Corpus Christi College, Cambridge at the age of sixteen. His lifelong passion for puzzles and ciphers stood him in good stead in his wartime service in British Intelligence (1944–47). After the war he read Modern Languages at Cambridge (French and German), 1947–50; upon graduation he entered the Civil Service. In 1952 he married Enid Tidmarsh (died 2002), a pianist. Their elder son, Richard, is a Japanese scholar and chess master working in Tokyo; their younger son Jeremy Sams is a composer, lyricist, playwright, and theatre director.

== Musicology ==
In music, Sams wrote on and studied a range of subjects and genres, though his specialty was German lieder. He wrote volumes on the songs of Robert Schumann, Johannes Brahms and Hugo Wolf. His theory of song-motifs is one of the 20th century's most important contributions to the research in the field of German song studies. From 1965 to 1980 he was a regular contributor to The Musical Times with essays and reviews. Most notably, he wrote on Schumann's and Brahms's ciphers and music codes (the "Clara-Theme", among others), on Elgar's Enigma and on Schubert's and Schumann's pathologies. His New Grove articles include Schubert and Schumann work-list, "Wolf" and Wolf work-list, "Mörike", "Hanslick" and "Musical Cryptography" (also in Grove 6). He reviewed opera performance for the New Statesman and wrote record reviews for Gramophone, both of these between 1976 and 1978.

== Shakespeare ==
"Shakespeare was an early starter who rewrote nobody's plays but his own... He may have been a master of structure before he was a master of language."

― Eric Sams, The Real Shakespeare: Retrieving the Early Years (1995), p. 146

In the field of Shakespeare studies, Sams specialised in the early phases of Shakespeare's career. He published over a hundred papers on the subject and wrote two books, The Real Shakespeare: Retrieving the Early Years, 1564–1594 (New Haven & London 1995) and The Real Shakespeare: Retrieving the Later Years, 1594–1616 (unfinished at the time of Sams's death, an edited text being published as an e-book by the Centro Studi "Eric Sams", 2008) .

Building on the work of W. J. Courthope, Hardin Craig, E. B. Everitt, Seymour Pitcher and others, Sams's thesis was that "Shakespeare was an early starter who rewrote nobody's plays but his own", and that the young playwright "may have been a master of structure before he was a master of language". Far from being a plagiarist, Shakespeare found accusations of plagiarism (e.g. Greene's "beautified with our feathers") offensive (Sonnets 30, 112). Trusting the early 'biographical' sources John Aubrey and Nicholas Rowe, Sams re-assessed Shakespeare's early and 'missing' years, and argued through detailed textual analysis that Shakespeare began writing plays from the mid-1580s, in a style not now recognisably Shakespearean.

In full critical editions of the two plays, he defended the attributions of the anonymous Edmund Ironside and Edward III to Shakespeare, and in an appendix argued that the "powerful drama" Thomas of Woodstock, or The first Part of the Reign of King Richard II was also Shakespeare's work. The so-called 'Source Plays' and 'Derivative Plays' (The Famous Victories of Henry V, The Taming of a Shrew, The Troublesome Reign of King John, King Leir, etc.), and the so-called 'Bad Quartos', are (compositors' errors aside) his own first versions of famous later plays. As many of the Quarto title-pages proclaim, Shakespeare was an assiduous reviser of his own work, rewriting, enlarging and emending to the end of his life. He "struck the second heat / upon the Muses' anvil", as Ben Jonson put it in the Folio verse tribute. Sams dissented from 20th-century orthodoxy, arguing strongly against the concept of memorial reconstruction by amnesiac actors, which he called a "wrong-headed" theory. "Authorial revision of early plays is the only rational alternative." The pirated copies referred to in the preamble to the Folio were the 1619 quartos, mostly already superseded plays, for "Shakespeare was disposed to release his own popular early version[s] for acting and printing because his own masterly revision[s] would soon be forthcoming".

Sams believed that Shakespeare in his retirement was revising his oeuvre "for definitive publication". The "apprentice plays" which had been reworked were naturally omitted from the Folio. Sams also rejected 20th-century orthodoxy on Shakespeare's collaboration: his view was that, with the exception of Sir Thomas More, Two Noble Kinsmen and Henry VIII, the plays were solely Shakespeare's, though many were only partly revised. By Sams's arguments for the dating and authorship of plays, Shakespeare wrote not only the earliest "modern" chronicle play, The Troublesome Reign, c. 1588, but also "the earliest known modern comedy and tragedy", A Shrew and the Ur-Hamlet (substantially = the 1603 Quarto).

Eric Sams's revised Shakespeare canon and chronology (including plays by some considered apocryphal, and including plays dismissed by some as 'Bad Quartos'):from The Real Shakespeare: Retrieving the Early Years, 1564–1594 (1995) & The Real Shakespeare: Retrieving the Later Years, 1594–1616 [unfinished] (2008)
The Famous Victories of Henry V	Written by Shakespeare c.1586 or earlier.	Released for printing c. 1598 as Shakespeare nearing completion of Henry IV–Henry V trilogy (see below).
King Leir	Written by Shakespeare c.1587.	Rewritten as the Quarto King Lear, the Folio text being further revised.
Pericles, Prince of Tyre	Written by Shakespeare late 1580s, as Jonson and Dryden reported.	Acts III–V rewritten for Quarto.
Edmund Ironside	Written by Shakespeare c.1588 or earlier. Sams believes the manuscript is Shakespeare's hand.	Sequel Hardicanute lost; Ironside withdrawn because anti-clerical & completely rewritten as Titus Andronicus.
Ur-Hamlet	Written by Shakespeare c.1588 or earlier; substantially = Hamlet Q1.	Rewritten and enlarged as Q2 Hamlet, the Folio text being further revised.
The Troublesome Reign of King John	Written by Shakespeare c.1588.	Rewritten as King John.
The Taming of a Shrew	Written by Shakespeare c.1588.	Rewritten as The Taming of the Shrew.
Titus Andronicus	Act I derives from an early version, written by Shakespeare c. 1589 (perhaps = Titus and Vespasian, Henslowe's 'Tittus & Vespacia', performed in 1592); rest revised c. 1592.	Scene added for Folio text.
The True Tragedy of Richard III	Written by Shakespeare c. 1589–90.	Rewritten as The Tragedy of King Richard III (see below).
Edward III	Written by Shakespeare c. 1589, revised 1593–94.	Omitted from Folio because anti-Scottish.
The First Part of the Contention	Written by Shakespeare c. 1589–90.	Rewritten as Henry VI, Part 2 for Folio.
Thomas of Woodstock, or The first Part of the Reign of King Richard II	Written by Shakespeare c. 1590.	Not printed. Richard II the sequel.
The True Tragedie of Richard Duke of Yorke	Written by Shakespeare c.1589-90.	Rewritten as Henry VI, Part 3 for Folio.
Henry VI, Part 1	Written by Shakespeare c. 1590–91.	
The Comedy of Errors	Written early 1590s. "A version played in 1594", but "no reason to suppose it was the Folio text".	
The Tragedy of King Richard III	First Quarto is Shakespeare's early version, written c.1593.	Folio text revised and enlarged.
Sonnets	Autobiographical and mostly written c. 1590–94; earliest (no. 145) from early 1580s, latest (nos. 107, 126) written 1603 & 1605. Southampton the addressee; Venus and Adonis and A Lover's Complaint also written for and about him. Barnaby Barnes the rival poet. Sir William Harvey "Mr. W.H.", a suggestion that pre-dates Rowse.	Sams infers that "Shakespeare approved the printing of his Sonnets, their arrangement was in his own order and their manuscript in his own hand."
Love's Labour's Lost	A drame à clef, contemporaneous with the Sonnets.	Later revised and enlarged.
The Two Gentlemen of Verona	A drame à clef, contemporaneous with the Sonnets, written by Shakespeare post-1594. Sams follows A. L. Rowse's identifications (Proteus = Southampton, Valentine = Shakespeare, Silvia = Dark Lady of Sonnets).	
Richard II	Written c.1595 or earlier.	Deposition scene added after 1598 (1608 Quarto), the Folio text being further revised.
A Midsummer Night's Dream	Sams follows A. L. Rowse's suggestion that this was played at the wedding in May 1594 of Mary Wriothesley, Countess of Southampton and Sir Thomas Heneage.	
Romeo and Juliet	First Quarto is Shakespeare's early version, written c.1594–1595.	"Corrected, augmented and amended" in Second Quarto, with minor revisions thereafter.
The Merchant of Venice	Sams accepts the suggestion that this was written in 1596, after the capture at Cádiz of the San Andrés, to which it refers.	
[ Love's Labour's Won ]	Written soon after Love's Labour's Lost and rewritten as All's Well That Ends Well, a drame à clef (Bertram = Southampton, Parolles = Barnaby Barnes, Lafew = Shakespeare).	All's Well revised c.1602.
The Merry Wives of Windsor	First Quarto is Shakespeare's early version, written late 1590s.	Substantially revised and enlarged for Folio.
Henry IV, Part 1 & Part 2	Written c.1597-98 (reworked from his Famous Victories of Henry V, c.1586 - see above).	Apologetic altering of Sir John Oldcastle (buffoon in Famous Victories) to Sir John Falstaff.
Henry V	First Quarto is Shakespeare's 'middle' version, written 1590s (reworked from his Famous Victories of Henry V).	The Folio text revised and enlarged, 1599.

- Sams also argued, more briefly, that "there is some evidence of Shakespearean authorship" of A Pleasant Commodie of Fair Em the Millers Daughter, with the loue of William the Conqueror, written before 1586, and of The Lamentable Tragedie of Locrine written mid-1580s and "newly set foorth, ouerseene and corrected, by W.S." in 1595.

Critical reaction to Sams's 1995 book was largely favourable. "Much of what is postulated for [Shakespeare's] boyhood years seems convincing," wrote Jonathan Keates, "including a background in Catholic recusancy and a schooling interrupted by family financial crisis. Neither is the idea of the poet as a reviser of his own early work implausible, and Sams is a persuasive salesman of his big idea that so-called 'bad quartos' represent valuable first thoughts." "His unwillingness to collude with academics against actors", wrote Professor Stephen Logan, "springs from a deep respect for the past. He would sooner trust eyewitness testimony, however informal, than the authority of [the Shakespeare Establishment] consensus."

== Selected works ==
- The Songs of Hugo Wolf, 1961 (rev. 1983).
- The Songs of Robert Schumann, 1969 (rev. 1993).
- Brahms Songs, 1972 (rev. 2000)
- Shakespeare's Lost Play, Edmund Ironside, 1986.
- The Real Shakespeare: Retrieving the Early years, 1564-1594, 1995.
- Shakespeare's Edward III: An Early Play Restored to the Canon, 1996.
- The Songs of Johannes Brahms, 2000.
- Essays and reviews on music, Shakespeare, and cryptography, 1966-1998, online edition in the web-pages of the Centro Studi "Eric Sams"
- The Real Shakespeare II: Retrieving the Later Years, 1594-1616, 2008, e-book published by the Centro Studi "Eric Sams"
- Opere complete in 15 volumi. Collana diretta da Erik Battaglia e Valentina Valente. Traduzione e cura di Erik Battaglia. Asti, Analogon Edizioni, 2007- (Vol.1, Il Tema di Clara, 2007; Vol.2, Variazioni con Enigma svelato, 2008; Vol.3, Introduzione ai Lieder di Brahms, 2008; Vol.4, Hugo Wolf. Introduzione alla vita e alle opere, 2008; Vol.5, Tabù or not tabù, 2010; Vol.6, I Lieder di Robert Schumann, 2010; Vol.7, Robert Schumann, Jean Paul: Papillons, with an Introduction and a Commentary by Eric Sams, 2010; Vol. 8, Musica e codici cifrati, 2011; Vol. 9, I Lieder di Hugo Wolf, 2011; Vol. 10, I Lieder di Johannes Brahms, 2013; Vol. 11, L'opera lirica è perfidia e passione per paranoici, 2015)
