= Dick of Devonshire =

Anonymous Jacobean era stage play

Dick of Devonshire is an anonymous Jacobean era stage play, based on the autobiography of the real-life English sailor Dicke of Devonshire. Written in 1626, it survived as part of MS Egerton 1994; a manuscript collection prepared by the actor William Cartwright around 1642, and later presented by him to Dulwich College. The play was first published by A.H. Bullen in his Old English Plays series in 1885.

== Authorship ==
Though most contemporary scholars agree with Bullen in his tentative placing of authorship with Thomas Heywood, the nineteenth-century critic F. G. Fleay attributed the anonymous play to Robert Davenport, basing his judgement largely on perceived similarities between that play and The City Nightcap.
