= Ian Robinson (author) =

- Born: 17 April 1937; Retford, Nottinghamshire, England
- Died: 30 October 2020 (aged 83); Weobley, Herefordshire, England
- Occupations: Lecturer at University of Wales, Swansea; Author, Literary Critic, Publisher
- Writing career
- Period: Late twentieth century

Ian Robinson (17 April 1937 – 30 October 2020) was a British literary critic and English lecturer.

== Life and career ==
Robinson was educated at King Edward VI Grammar School, Retford, Nottinghamshire, and Downing College, Cambridge, where he was a pupil of F. R. Leavis and earned firsts in both parts of the English Tripos. Upon graduation in 1958, he supervised undergraduates at Downing alongside Leavis and Morris Shapira while undertaking graduate research on the metrics of Chaucer and medieval poetry. Awarded a research fellowship at the newly-established Churchill College in 1961, he soon left Cambridge to take up a post as lecturer (and, later, senior lecturer) in the English Department at University College, Swansea, where he remained until 1997.

== Academic output ==
Best known for his 1973 book The Survival of English, Robinson has been a champion of traditional English literature and a critic of what he alleges to be the degeneration of the English language in modern life. With David Sims, he co-founded The Brynmill Press Ltd, in 1970, a company devoted to serious criticism which began with the quarterly review The Human World (1970–4) and went on to publish works of literary criticism, philosophy (including Ludwig Wittgenstein’s Remarks on Frazer’s “Golden Bough”), fiction, and poetry.

Robinson's book The New Grammarians' Funeral (1975) was a critique of Noam Chomsky's generative grammar. It was well received by few linguists.

Robinson was a critic of the Matthew Arnold, T. S. Eliot, and Leavis tradition, as discussed in his book The English Prophets. Along with works of pure literary criticism on Chaucer, he has published much in a category he calls “criticism of language”, beginning with The Survival of English, which includes comments on the language of the media, of religion, of politics. He thinks that judgement is always a refinement of a sense held in common, and in 2008 published Holding the Centre, trying to demonstrate that a number of the Arts subjects have become incoherent by losing their place in the common language. He differed from his mentor Leavis by holding the view that judgement in literature cannot do without Christianity, and he has been a trustee of the Prayer Book Society.

He died on 30 October 2020, at the age of 83.

== Books ==
- Chaucer’s Prosody (1971) ISBN 0-907839-28-2
- Chaucer and the English Tradition (1972) ISBN 0-521-08231-5
- The Survival of English: Essays in criticism of language (1973) ISBN 0-521-20191-8
- With David Sims, The Decline and Fall of Mr Heath (1974) ISBN 0-9502723-4-5
- The New Grammarians’ Funeral (1975) ISBN 0-521-20856-4
- Prayers for the New Babel (1983) ISBN 0-907839-04-5
- Richard II and Woodstock (1988) ISBN 0-907839-35-5 Brynmill Press.
- The Establishment of Modern English Prose in the Reformation and the Enlightenment (1998) ISBN 0-521-48088-4
- The English Prophets: A critical defence of English criticism (2001) ISBN 0-907839-66-5
- With Duke Maskell, The New Idea of a University (2001) ISBN 1-903660-00-9
- Chaucer and the English Tradition (second, completely rewritten edition, 2004)
- Who Killed the Bible? (2006) ISBN 0-907839-49-5
- Holding the Centre (2008) ISBN 978-0-907839-97-2
- Untied Kingdom (2008) ISBN 0-907839-99-1
- How to Read Shakespeare's Verse (2019) ISBN 0-956704-87-5
