= Jean Argles =

British World War II code breaker

Jean Argles (née Owtram) (7 November 1925 – 2 April 2023) was a Second World War code breaker and cipher officer. She and her sister Pat Davies are often referred to as "The Codebreaking Sisters". As a teenager, Jean Owtram joined the First Aid Nursing Yeomanry (FANY) in London, signing the Official Secrets Act 1911 and working in the Special Operations Executive (SOE). She contributed to the SOE's resistance network behind enemy lines, decoding messages from agents in the field. Promoted to the rank of officer at the age of 18, she worked in Egypt, Italy and Austria. In her later years she discovered that her sister had also been doing secret war work. Until Argles died in 2023, they were the last two sisters who had been required to sign the Official Secrets Act. The sisters appeared live and on radio and TV, relating stories of war time and co-publishing, in their nineties, a book titled Codebreaking Sisters: Our Secret War which became a best seller.

== Early life ==
Dorothy (née Daniel) and Carey Owtram had three children, Pat, Jean and Robert. Carey Owtram owned a cotton mill in Bolton, Lancashire, and the military-minded family lived in a large sandstone house in the countryside. After being home-schooled, the children were sent to boarding school for a few years. Jean Owtram returned home from boarding school at age sixteen and took a secretarial course in order to have a qualification suitable for employment. In 1941 Carey Outram, who had been in the Territorial Army, went with his regiment to serve in the Far East. After the battle of Singapore, he was a prisoner of war in a Japanese camp until 1945. Jean Outram was keen to join the war effort. Her sister Pat had joined the WRENS but they were only recruiting for cooks at the time and this did not appeal to the younger sister.

== Career ==
An aunt who lived in London encouraged Argles to apply to join the 2,000 elite, uniformed personnel of FANY, the oldest of the women's forces, which had been founded in 1907. Argles' invitation for interview arrived on her eighteenth birthday. In the interview she was asked about her ability to do crosswords and, surprised, told of her childhood hobby. She was accepted as a code breaker. After two or three weeks of basic training and having signed the Official Secrets Act, she was charged in 1943 with decoding messages from agents abroad using a wireless-based, handwritten system that was changed daily. This was top secret work and she had to get off one stop early from the bus taking her to her job in Baker Street, from where the underground movements in Europe were managed, so that nobody should know where she worked. The cryptographer Leo Marks was working in the same building. Although only 18, Argles soon became a shift leader in the SOE and then was selected and sent, with her mother's reluctant permission, to serve overseas. She became an officer on overseas posting and left from Liverpool via Glasgow to Cairo where she intercepted messages from partisans in Greece. In 1944, she transferred to Italy, decoding messages about matters such as troop movements, ammunition and medical supplies.

On her second stint in Italy, she worked in the Allied Control Commission, then with refugees in Austria for the Central Mediterranean Forces, and later with UNESCO.

Back in the UK after the war, Outram held a number of posts, working as a social worker in Scotland and then as Lancaster University's first career advisor, a post she settled into until retirement in 1980.

== Personal life ==
Throughout the war, Argles wrote letters to her sister Patricia. Since both had signed the Official Secrets Act and had been involved in top secret work, it was not until they were elderly, and after the publication of material about the work of Bletchley Park, that the two sisters talked to each other about their war work and discovered the similarities in their war experiences. Their parents never knew anything about the top secret war work that their daughters had undertaken.

In 1968 Jean Owtram married Michael Argles, the University of Lancaster librarian. He died in 1988. Jean Argles died in 2023 aged 97, leaving her sister Pat and three stepchildren.

== Legacy ==
Jean Argles and Pat Davies published a book using their maiden name of Owtram.

Details of Argles's life were recorded in Army Girls by Tessa Dunlop, published in 2021.

There are eight films about Jean Argles in the Veterans Video Archive.

Argles was featured on the Radio 4 obituaries programme Last Word.
