= Revenge for Honour =

Revenge for Honour is a Caroline tragedy, printed posthumously in 1654 and presumably written by Henry Glapthorne (1610-1643). The text is available from among George Chapman's works.

The play was registered in 1653, but does not seem to have been produced in recent times.

== Dramatic characters ==
- Almanzor, caliph of Arabia
- Abilqualit, his eldest son
- Abrahen, his son by a second wife, brother to Abilqualit
- Tarifa, an old general, conqueror of Spain, tutor to Abilqualit
- Mura, a rough lord, a soldier, kinsman by his mother to Abrahen
- Simanthes, a court lord, allied to Abrahen
- Selinthus, an honest, merry court lord
- Mesithes, a court eunuch, attendant on Abilqualit
- Osman, a captain to Tarifa
- Gaselles, another captain
- Caropia, wife to Mura, first beloved of Abrahen, then of Abilqualit
- Perilinda, her woman
- Soldiers, Mutes, Guard, Attendants

== Summary ==
Arabia has declared war on Persia, but the prince and heir to the throne, Abilqualit, does not wish to go. Instead, he wishes to pursue adulterous relations with Caropia, wife to Mura, a blunt soldier. Abrahen is jealous of his half-brother, all the more so since Caropia refused him as her lover. He wishes to obtain the crown from him. An opportunity arises when Mesithes the eunuch divulges to Abrahen that his brother cuckolds Mura. Abrahen warns Caropia of her husband's frantic jealousy, suggesting she should accuse Abilqualit of rape. When her husband arrives in rage, she follows Abrahen's suggestion. Later, Abrahen appeases Mura by telling him he will obtain revenge by his father, the caliph, as the punishment of adultery in Arabia is blinding. When informed of his son's deed, Tarifa attempts to dissuade Almanzor, the caliph, from this harsh punishment. Almanzor retorts: "twas a rape/Upon my honour more than on her whiteness." Mura asks but justice: "The sun himself, when he darts rays lascivious,/Such as engender by too piercing fervence/Intemperate and infectious heats, straight wears/Obscurity from the clouds his own beams raises." Abrahen enters and pretends to wish to save his half-brother, while soldiers beset the palace. Angry at this intrusion, Almanzor cries out to his son and then to his servants: "Have you your champions?/We will prevent their insolence; you shall not/Boast you have got the empire by our ruin:/Mutes, strangle him immediately." Abilqualit falls. Led by Simanthes, the soldiers enter, but are put down by the caliph. To make sure of his death, Abrahen drops a poisoned handkerchief on Abilqualit, which the father picks up. The poison kills him and Abrahen is pronounced the new caliph. With everyone gone, Abilqualit rises, surviving both strangling and poisoning.

When learning of her lover's apparent death, Caropia stabs Mura to death, crying out : "Would it were possible/To kill even thy eternity!" Before dying, he hears his wife admit Abilqualit "did enjoy me freely". Soldiers loyal to Abilqualit enter to cut Mura's throat. They do so, not knowing he is already dead. They also threaten to cut Caropia's throat, who is saved by Tarifa. Installed as caliph, Abrahen asks Mesenthes to renew his courtship of Caropia. She enters as he would wish. Considering herself the murdereress of Albaquit by her falsehood, Caropia, not knowing that Abilqualit is alive, first intends to avenge him. Abrahen tempts her, saying of his brother: "As I succeeded him in all his glories/'Tis fit I do succeed him in his love." Caropia is about to yield to his advances when Abilqualit and his soldiers suddenly enter. Surrounded, Abrahen stabs Caropia, then kills himself, poisoned by the handkerchief. When Abilqualit kneels to help Caropia, she, frustrated at not being his empress, stabs him to death. The empire is Tarifa's.

== Authorship ==
Revenge for Honour was believed up to the 20th century to have been written by George Chapman, appearing in volumes of his works in the 19th century, but the current consensus appears to favor authorship by Glapthorne since J.H. Walter's article in The Review of English Studies (1937).

== Critical opinions ==
In The Review of English Studies (1935), C.F. Beckingham pronounces the play as being "worthless", comparing it unfavorably to William Shakespeare's Othello, and noting borrowings from that play. In both plays, jealousy is a prominent theme. In both, important use is made of a handkerchief, though for different ends. Not many works on jealousy in any era, except for The Winter's Tale, would be near Othello in emotional impact. Nevertheless, some of the characters are pale images of other Jacobean plays, for example Mura, the blunt soldier, tame in comparison to Mardonius in A King and No King by Francis Beaumont and John Fletcher. But although generally weak in poetic utterance, the play has a few strong scenes of dramatic conflict, especially father versus son and half-brother against half-brother. Competition between family members, especially brothers, is an important characteristic of the tragedies of Jean Racine, notably La Thébaïde (1664, The Thebans).
