= Charlemagne, or the Distracted Emperor =

Play dated around 1600

Charlemagne, or the Distracted Emperor is an early modern play dated around 1600, derived from the Egerton Collection manuscript formerly in the British Museum and now British Library, Egerton MS 1994. It is the only Elizabethan or Jacobean play to survive in manuscript form. Its first printing appears to be by A. H. Bullen in his A Collection of Old English Plays. Bullen gives this text the title The Distracted Emperor, but in the Egerton manuscript it is untitled. Although the play is anonymous and collaborative authorship is common in late-Elizabethan and early-Jacobean drama, most sources agree that the principal author is probably George Chapman, and not other mentioned possibilities, including Nathan Field and John Fletcher.

It was printed for the Malone Society by John de Monins Johnson at the Oxford University Press in 1937.

The play is animated by a myriad of political intrigue, suspicion and conspiracy in the medieval court of the ageing Charlemagne. Act I opens with news that Charlemagne has married Theodora, and at the heart of the play's machinations are the new empress's siblings, the Machiavellian Ganelon and Gabriella (in love with courtier Richard). In recognition of his help in arranging the royal marriage, Ganelon is promoted as Constable of France, and amid the euphoric atmosphere there comes news of Prince Orlando's conquests in Spain.

In Act Two, a triumphant Orlando has reached the outskirts of Paris where his reflections on his love of Theodora are devastated by news of the birth to her of a son. Worse, she has died in childbirth, followed by the death of Charlemagne's mother. The emperor is utterly distraught, carrying his wife's corpse around - until that is, Richard discovers and removes a strange ring beneath her tongue. The effect is profound and immediate. Charlemagne becomes utterly focused and businesslike, yet, mysteriously falls in love with Bishop Turpin. Meanwhile Ganelon is placed under house-arrest for the attempted murder of Orlando.

Act Three sees the emperor now in sharp mental decline, relying on the advice of sycophants like Turpin. Ganelon is further punished, heavily fined, stripped of all honours and forbidden to communicate with Richard. Nevertheless, Ganelon blesses the proposed marriage of his son, La Busse. Gabriella is in despair that she is forbidden even to meet her Richard.

In the following act La Busse petitions Charlemagne to have his father's former wealth and titles restored (amid rumours that these are actually to be bestowed on Richard). While at first rejecting his overtures, Charlemagne bizarrely promises to assent to La Busse's request on that day when he meets the young man on an ass in a deserted country lane.

Most of these and other heady machinations find their denouement in Act Five, which opens with a confrontation in which Richard, unfairly suspected of conspiring on behalf of Prince Orlando, is murdered by Ganelon. A letter is discovered on Richard's body incriminating Ganelon in a plot and imputing, his sister, Gabriella's whoring. She in fact admits the letter as her own fabrication for which he murders her, and he is promptly arrested. La Busse abases himself, as required, before Charlemagne, with the result that Ganelon is briefly pardoned - that is until Orlando announces the truth of the 'witchcraft ring' and of Ganelon's crimes. In a more or less happy ending, Charlemagne orders Ganelon to be 'broken on the wheel' and Orlando is rewarded with the governorship of Spain.

A. H. Bullen's belief that the principal author was George Chapman, and his rejection of the claims for Nathan Field have been supported by later textual scholarship. Franck L. Schoell detects the stylistic influence of Christopher Marlowe in the play, and finds clear similarities of both theme and style to Chapman's other plays. He suggests that Charlemagne might be Chapman's "lost French play" of 1598-99.
