= Henry Green (courtier) =

Sir Henry Green, JP (c. 1347 – 1399) was a courtier and councillor to king Richard II of England.

== Ancestry ==
Born in Northamptonshire, he was the son of Sir Henry Green, a lawyer and Chief Justice of the King's Bench, by his second marriage to Katherine Drayton, daughter of Sir John Drayton of Drayton.

== Career ==
Green inherited Drayton House in Northamptonshire at his father's death in 1370. He became a JP in 1380 and MP for Huntingdonshire in 1390, for Northamptonshire in 1394 and 1397 and finally in the autumn of 1397 he became MP for Wiltshire. He also served in France with John of Gaunt.

He became a close confidant of King Richard II. Along with Sir John Bussy and Sir William Bagot he was appointed one of the eccentric Richard's 'continual councillors' who gained an unsavoury reputation. At one point they advised the king to confiscate the lands of the exiled Henry Bolingbroke, Duke of Hereford.

When Bolingbroke returned from exile in 1399 to reclaim his inheritance, the three councillors decided flight was the best option. Bussy and Green sought sanctuary in Bristol Castle but were delivered up to Bolingbroke on 28 July 1399, who had them beheaded the following day. Bagot was spared and eventually pardoned.

All three continual councillors (referred to as "caterpillars") feature in Shakespeare's historical play King Richard II, generally listed as "Bushy, Baghot and Green". Green also appears in the anonymous Elizabethan play Thomas of Woodstock.

== Family ==
He married Maud (or Matilda) Mauduit, daughter and heiress of Thomas Mauduit, by whom he had several children, including;

- Ralph, his heir
- Eleanor, m. Sir John Fitzwilliam (d. 5 July 1417).
