= John Bussy =

English politician (died 1399)

Sir John Bussy (also Bushy; died 29 July 1399) of Hougham in Lincolnshire was a member of parliament representing Lincolnshire or Rutland eleven times from 1383 to 1398 as a Knight of the Shire. He was also Speaker of the House of Commons at the three Parliaments between 1393 and 1398, during which he supported the policies of king Richard II. He was most famous for orchestrating the abdication of parliament's power to an eighteen-man subcommittee in order to concentrate power in the hands of the king's supporters.

Bussy's pre-eminence at court and execution after Richard's abdication were dramatised by Shakespeare in Richard II, where he appears as one of three councillors (Bushy, Bagot and Greene) who are accused by Henry Bolingbroke (later Henry IV) of misleading the king. He also appears as a character in Thomas of Woodstock.

== Early career ==
He was the son of Sir William Bussy and Isabel Paynell, the daughter of John Paynell. He married twice; firstly in 1382 to Maud, daughter of Sir Philip de Neville and secondly in 1386 to Mary, widow of Ralph Daubeney. He owned lands in Lincolnshire.

In 1378 he secured a position with John of Gaunt, the Duke of Lancaster, as the Steward of all his lands north of the Trent. He worked for the Duke until 1397 but had by then (1391) entered the service of Richard II. He was High Sheriff of Lincolnshire in 1383, 1385 and 1390.

== Consolidation of power ==
He became a close confidant and advisor of Richard and together with Sir Henry Green and Sir William Bagot became a "continual councillor". The three continual councillors went on to acquire an unsavoury reputation. Bussy became notorious for his gross flattery of the king. He was elected speaker of the House of Commons three (or possibly four) times, first in 1394, probably in 1395 and later by the two parliaments convened in 1397. It was in the latter of the two that Bussy became most notorious. He forced the parliament to delegate all its authority to a committee of which he was a member. The committee comprised eighteen members (12 Lords, 6 Commons). Each was carefully chosen as a strong supporter of Richard. By this means Bussy secured a monopoly on power by the king's supporters.

== Fall and death ==
When Henry Bolingbroke (King Henry IV) returned in 1399 from exile to forcibly claim his inheritance, Bussy was captured on 28 July at Bristol Castle, together with William le Scrope, 1st Earl of Wiltshire and Sir Henry Green, and the next day tried and beheaded for crimes of treason against the Kingdom.

== In English drama ==
- In Shakespeare's Richard II he is one of three councillors (Bushy, Bagot and Greene) accused by Bolingbroke of misleading the king.
- Bussy also appears in Thomas of Woodstock as "William Bushy", again portrayed as one of the king's favourites.

Parliament of England
Preceded by James Pickering	Speaker of the House of Commons; 1394-1397	Succeeded by Sir John Cheney
