= Edmund Ironside (play) =

Anonymous Elizabethan play apocryphally attributed to Shakespeare

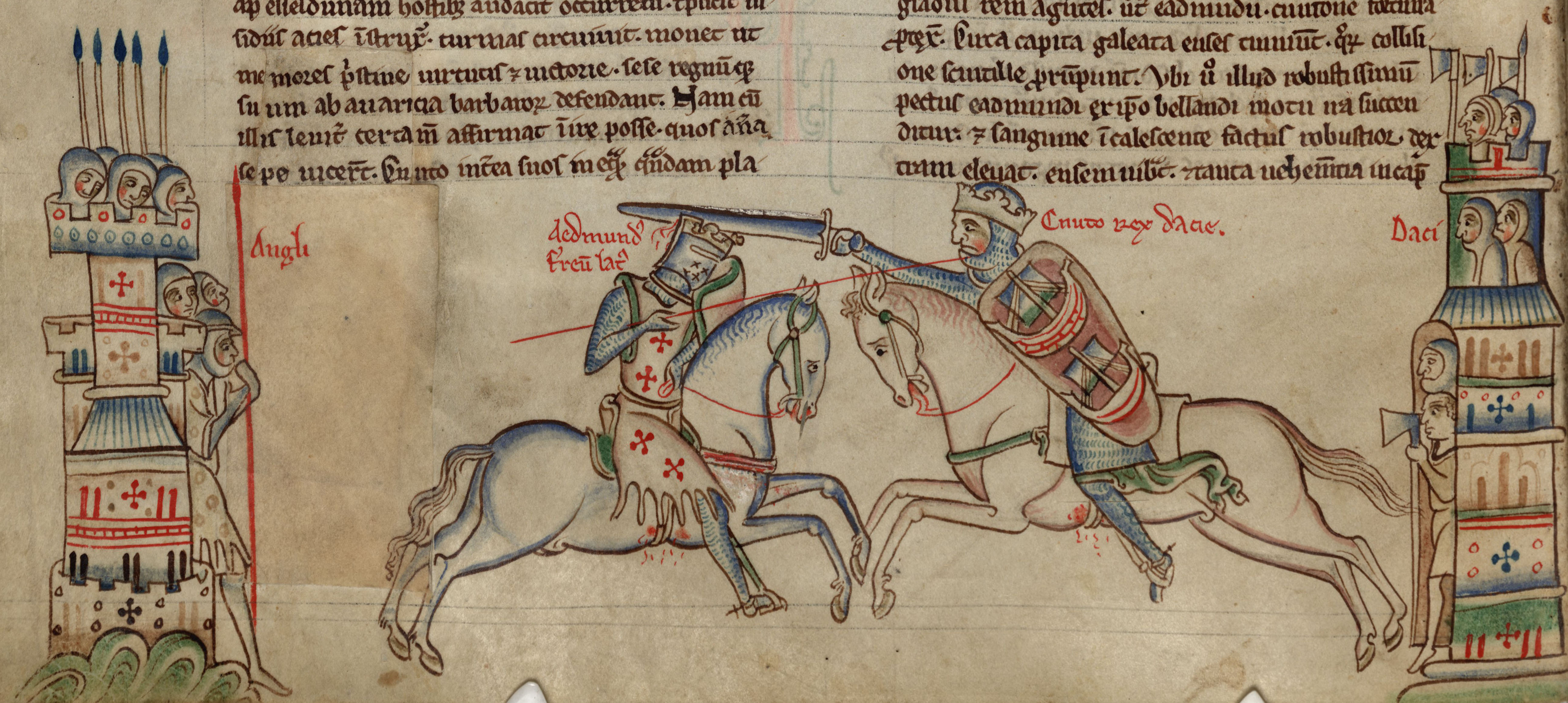
Ironside battles Canute, an illustration of the actual history the play is based on. From the Chronica Majora of Matthew Paris, in the Parker Library, Cambridge.

Edmund Ironside, or War Hath Made All Friends is an anonymous Elizabethan play that depicts the life of the Anglo-Saxon king Edmund II of England. At least three critics have suggested that it is an early work by William Shakespeare.

== Text ==
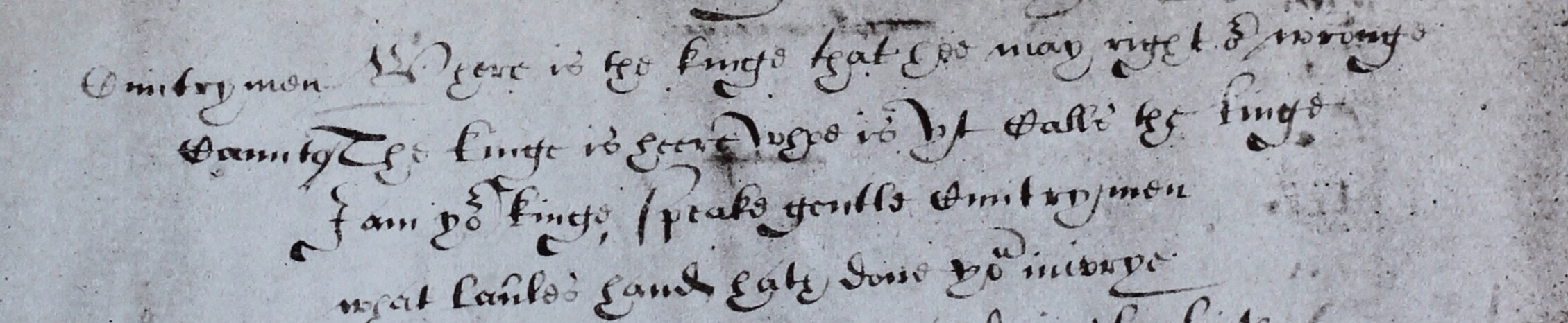
From Act I, scene i of Edmund Ironside. "Countrymen: Where is the king, that he may right our wrong? Canutus: The king is here; who is it calls the king? I am your king. Speak, gentle countrymen, what lawless hand hath done you injury?"

The play was never published in its own era; the unique copy of the text was preserved in MS. Egerton 1994, an important collection of play manuscripts now in the collection of the British Library.

== Authorship ==
E. B. Everitt, Eric Sams, and Peter Ackroyd have argued that this play is perhaps Shakespeare's first drama. According to Sams, Edmund Ironside "contains some 260 words or usages which on the evidence of the Oxford English Dictionary were first used by Shakespeare himself.... Further, it exhibits 635 instances of Shakespeare's rare words including some 300 of the rarest."

Sams dates the play to 1587, noting that the play's presentation after that period until the death of Elizabeth I would have been illegal because of an edict that was passed that would have applied to a scene featuring a brawl between two archbishops. He further argues that the play's strong similarities in both line and plot to Titus Andronicus, and the latter play's high number of mentions of the Roman setting, may indicate that Titus is something of a rewriting of Edmund Ironside. His appendix notes correlations of images and ideas that are found only in Shakespeare's plays and not from any known playwright of the era, such as serpents stinging via their tongues and reporting of Judas Iscariot saying "all hail," which is non-Biblical, but also found in such plays as Henry VI, Part 3 and Richard II.

== Synopsis ==
=== Act I ===
Edmund Ironside tells the story of a battle between two men who both want to be king of England: Edmund Ironside, who is a native, and depicted as noble, and Canutus (based on Cnut the Great), who is a Danish prince, and depicted as treacherous. Canutus is preoccupied with the possibility that the native English population will side with Ironside and rebel against Canutus.

A third important figure is Edricus (based on Eadric Streona), who is duplicitous, plays each side against the other, and who also wants the crown. Edricus is occasionally found alone on stage, and frequently boasts about his villainy (in a manner similar to the protagonist of Shakespeare's Richard III).

=== Act II ===
Stitch, brother to Edricus, is a cobbler, and wants to join the ranks of his brother's supporters. Their mother discloses that Edricus was in fact born the bastard child of a soldier she once met. Edricus calls her a witch, and says that Stitch can enter his service, but first he must banish their parents from town. Stitch does this.

Canutus, angry that two of his supporters have deserted him on the day of his wedding to Southampton's daughter, Egina, decides to get revenge on them by cutting off the hands and noses of their sons. Stitch gets an axe and cuts off the hands of the two boys. News arrives that Ironside has had a victory against Canutus' troops in the north.

=== Act III ===
Canutus attacks London. Ironside's army fights back.

Edricus attempts to frighten Ironside's men by showing them a severed head and declaring it to be Ironside's. Then Ironside reappears, and in a battle Canutus is again driven back, and Ironside praises his men for the victory.

Canutus rails against his troops and supporters, calling them cowards. After this, Edricus writes to Ironside, asking forgiveness. He then exchanges clothing with Stitch.

Stitch, now dressed in aristocratic clothing, has a scene where he play-acts the part, and is a Falstaffian comic tyrant.

=== Act IV ===
Ironside reads the letter written by Edricus, and delivered by the disguised Edricus. In the letter Edricus claims that he defected because of rumors that Ironside was hunting for him, and he begs for mercy. Ironside is skeptical, and then recognizes Edricus beneath his disguise. Edricus explains that he planned to reveal himself and side with Ironside, or else exile himself. Edricus also claims to have information regarding Canutus' military plans. Ironside is trusting and announces that he will give Edricus a military command. In an aside, Edricus admires the success of his own dissimulation.

Meanwhile, as the Danes are ravaging the country, Emma, the stepmother of Ironside, says goodbye to her two young sons Alfred and Edward, who are about to embark and find safety with her brother, Duke Richard of Normandy.

Canutus receives a letter from Edricus describing his insinuation into Ironside's confidences. Canutus exults at this, and his soldiers look forward to battle. The drums sound.

Edricus meets Canutus and tells him he plans to be absent when Ironside needs him most. When Ironside attacks Canutus, Edricus backs Canutus and Ironside is driven off. Canutus promises to reward Edricus. Edricus then runs after Ironside to try to explain.

=== Act V ===
Ironside is cursing Edricus, when Edricus enters limping and with his hand wrapped in a scarf, claiming that he had a plan to support Ironside, if only Ironside had not retreated. Edricus points to his “injuries”. Ironside is persuaded and apologizes. Alone Edricus gloats.

Ironside and Canutus meet, each claiming to be king. Canutus, uses his knowledge of the law to argue his point. Ironside, angry, argues in return. They then draw swords, and a battle begins. Edricus has an idea to resolve the issue. He suggest that they either split the kingdom or that Canutus and Ironside fight one-on-one. The idea is accepted and the fight between the two men begins. Ironside seems to be winning, and Canutus yields, offering his hand to Ironside, who receives it honorably. Ironside wants the Danes to select which side, east or west, of England they want. Canutus and Ironside leave to go celebrate. Edricus, in an aside, speaks the last words of the play: “By heaven I'll be revenged on both of you.”
