= The Lady Mother =

1630s play

The Lady Mother is a Caroline-era stage play, a tragicomedy of the middle 1630s, generally attributed to Henry Glapthorne. Never printed in its own era, the play survived in a manuscript marked as a theatre prompt-book, revealing significant details about the stage practice of its time.

== History ==
The Lady Mother was licensed for performance by the office of the Master of the Revels on 15 October 1635. It was originally staged by the King's Revels Men at the Salisbury Court Theatre, and was acted for the royal court at Whitehall Palace that year.

The play was not published for more than two centuries, until it was included by editor A. H. Bullen in the second volume of his Old English Plays in 1883. It was Bullen who first attributed the work to Glapthorne. The Malone Society produced a modern text in 1959 (published then as edited by Arthur Brown but now acknowledged by the Society to have been significantly plagiarised by Brown from the 1953 BLitt thesis of his student Patricia Davies). The drama survived the centuries in manuscript form, part of MS Egerton 1994 (folios 186–211) in the collection of the British Library. In the manuscript, the entrances and exits are consistently marked, the entrances in advance so that the prompter could cue the actors; the necessary properties are also marked, in advance of their needs. Cues for music and dancing are also included – all the details that the prompter would have needed to guide the performance. The manuscript displays its licence on the final page. The manuscript is a scribal copy, and shows repeated revision; it reveals Glapthorne working with his scribe to shape the final text. The Revels office (specifically William Blagrave, the assistant of the Master, Sir Henry Herbert) demanded some changes in the text, and several lines are crossed out, to be omitted from performance.

F. G. Fleay speculated that The Lady Mother was an alternative title for The Noble Trial, a Glapthorne play that was among those in the collection of John Warburton that were destroyed by fire.

Bullen argued that Glapthorne's play showed the influence of the drama of James Shirley, a dominant figure in Caroline drama.

== Plot ==
The play's plot involves the marital fortunes of Lady Marlove (the eponymous "lady mother") and her daughters Belisea and Clariana. One of her suitors is a foolish old country knight, Sir Geffrey – a figure who provides the play's lighter comic element. The more serious element of the plot involves Lady Marlove and her son facing execution for a supposed murder. The play concludes in a "death masque" in which a personified Death invokes despair and the Furies, only to be dispelled by Hymen, the god of marriage. It is then revealed that Thurston, the supposedly dead man, is alive and married to Clariana, resolving the narrative in a happy ending.
