= The Elder Brother =

Play by John Fletcher and Philip Massinger

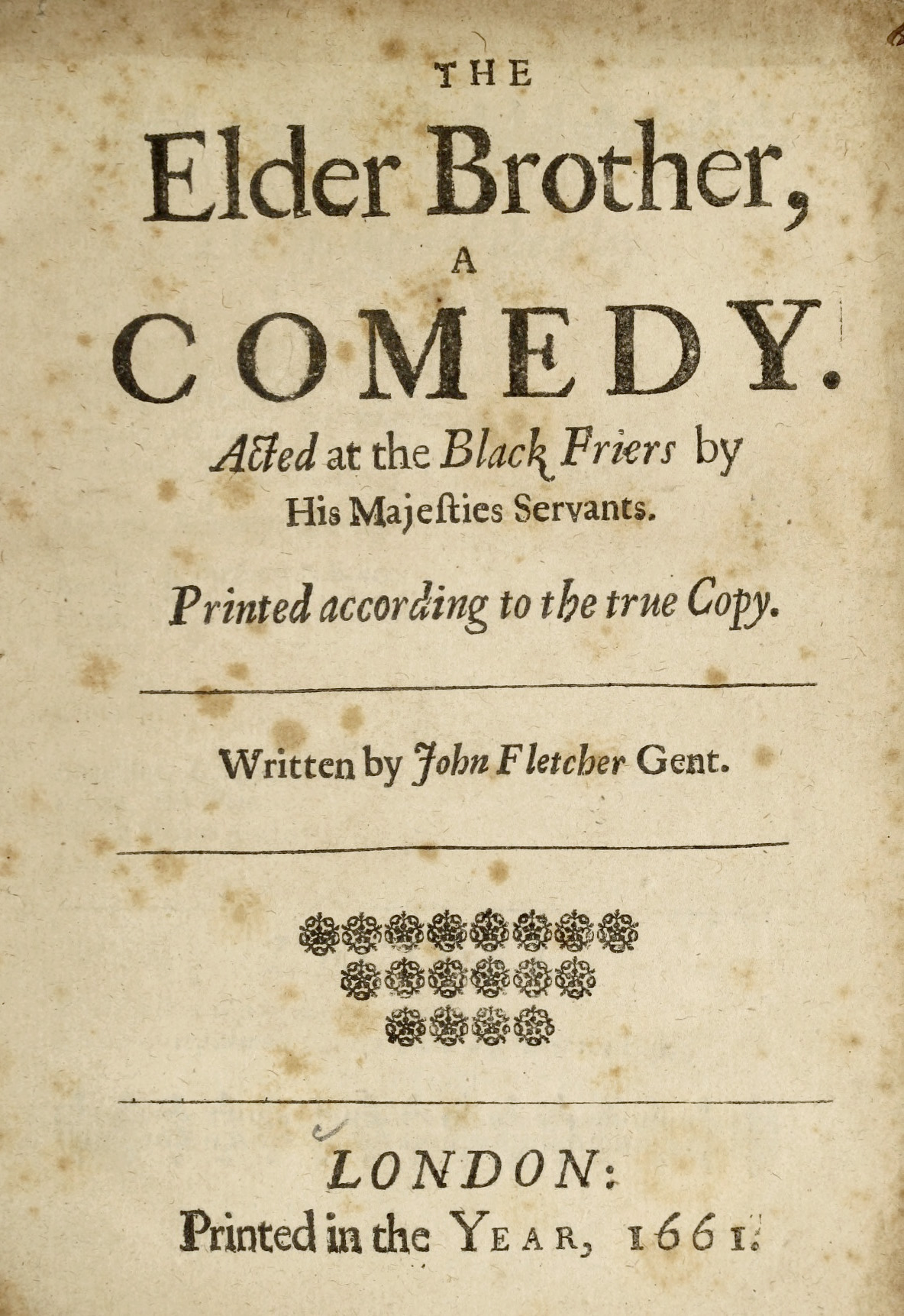
Title page of the 1661 quarto

The Elder Brother is an early seventeenth-century English stage play, a comedy written by John Fletcher and Philip Massinger. Apparently dating from 1625, it may have been the last play Fletcher worked on before his August 1625 death.

== Date ==
Both the Prologue and the Epilogue of the play mention Fletcher's passing; the Prologue refers to him as "now dead," indicating, perhaps, a recent event. The Elder Brother is unusual in the canons of both Fletcher and Massinger in being almost entirely in prose rather than verse. (Only the Prologue, the Epilogue, and a lyric in III,v are in verse; and the Prologue and Epilogue are of uncertain authorship, in this play as in others.) A prose play was logically easier and quicker to compose that a work in verse. It is possible that The Elder Brother was a "rush job" done in the final weeks and months of Fletcher's life.

== Performance ==
The early performance history of the play is unknown. The first recorded performance occurred at the Blackfriars Theatre on 25 April 1635; and it was staged at Hampton Court Palace on 5 January 1637. The play was revived during Restoration era, like many other popular plays in the Fletcher canon; it was performed as early as Friday 23 November 1660, and Samuel Pepys saw it on 6 September 1661, but thought it "ill acted." The play remained in the repertory for years, and was a "principal old stock play" of the era.

== Publication ==
The play was first published in 1637, in a quarto printed by Felix Kingston for the booksellers John Benson and John Waterson, with a title-page attribution to Fletcher. The first quarto exists in two states, with minor typographical differences between them. A second quarto was issued in 1651 by bookseller Humphrey Moseley. (The rights to the play were transferred to Moseley in Oct. 1646, according to the Stationers' Register; the recording entry cites the playwright's name as "Mr. Fflesher" – one of the odder vagaries in the famously flexible orthography of the English Renaissance.) A third quarto followed in 1661, with a fourth in 1678

The Elder Brother was omitted from the first Beaumont and Fletcher folio of 1647, like other previously printed Fletcher plays; it was included in the second folio of 1679. The title pages of all the quartos agree that the play was staged by the King's Men at the Blackfriars Theatre.

The play also exists in a manuscript, part of the collection MS. Egerton 1994 in the collection of the British Library. The text of the MS. shows a range of small differences from the printed texts (mainly single words, and a few lines).

== Attributions ==
The play was originally assigned to Fletcher alone; but Q2 assigned The Elder Brother to Beaumont and Fletcher. Q3 returns to the original attribution to Fletcher alone; but Q4 reverts to Beaumont and Fletcher. (The play dates from long after Beaumont's retirement from the stage in 1613 and his death in 1616.)

== Authorship ==
Given Fletcher's highly distinctive literary style, it has not been difficult for scholars to delineate the respective shares of the two authors. Cyrus Hoy, in his comprehensive study of authorship problems in Fletcher's canon, agrees with other commentators in assigning Acts I and V to Massinger, and Acts II, III, and IV to Fletcher – the same division of shares displayed in The False One, another of their collaborative efforts. Hoy judged The Elder Brother to be a work originally by Fletcher alone, "the first and last acts of which have been virtually rewritten by Massinger."

== Synopsis ==
Lewis is a French nobleman who lives on his country estates, where he raises his only child, Angellina. He takes care to guide the girl away from the sybaritic sloth in which many aristocratic women indulge, encouraging her to "rise with the sun, walk, dance, or hunt, and learn the virtues of plants and simples" (Act I, scene 1). Yet now that she is fourteen years old, he judges it appropriate that she be married to a fitting husband. Lewis looks toward his neighbor Brisac, who has two eligible sons. The older, Charles (the play's title character), is a scholar, who ignores everyday concerns and prefers his books; the younger, Eustace, is a courtier, fashionable and worldly. Both Lewis and Brisac decide that Eustace is the right match for Angellina.

They face a problem, however: under the rules of primogeniture, Charles is heir to his father's estates, while Eustace is merely a younger son with no independent income. The two fathers scheme to oust Charles from his privileged place and convey his birthright to Eustace. The protests of Brisac's brother Miramount, who favors Charles and admires his intellectual pursuits, are dismissed. Brisac promises Charles an income that will provide for his bookish life; and Charles is naive enough to accept the offer – until he meets Angellina in person. He is instantly swept away by her, as she is with him; and he is inspired to defend his rights, knowing that he needs an estate to support a wife. He refuses to sign the legal documents that Brisac and Lewis have prepared, documents that would effectively disinherit him.

Brisac and Lewis are both outraged at the failure of their plan. Brisac orders Charles out of his house, as Lewis does Angellina; but the young couple find refuge with Miramount. Angellina is at first concerned about her honor and reputation – but Charles assures her that he will treat her with respect and discretion. Eustace and two of his courtier friends, Cowsy and Egremont, go to confront Charles; but the newly emboldened young man seizes Eustace's sword and drives the three of them out. Brisac and Lewis, meanwhile, have a falling-out over the bad outcome of their scheme.

In conversation with Cowsy and Egremont, Eustace is disillusioned by their frank cowardice and their self-centered disregard for considerations of honor; he obtains one of their swords, then chases them away and goes to confront his brother once again. The two brothers begin a duel over Angellina and their disrupted inheritance. Miramount tries to stop them, and they are interrupted by the news that Brisac has taken legal action over the matter, seizing both Lewis and Angellina. Miramount, Charles, and Eustace go to prevent this. The childless Miramount makes an offer that pacifies all concerned: he will make Eustace the heir to his estates and support the young man in finding a wife. Charles and Angellina can then proceed to the altar without hindrance.

Being written in prose rather than verse, the play lacks the embellishments of style normal for Fletcher and Massinger; it compensates with vigorous and entertaining vollies of invective. At one point, Miramount calls his brother Brisac "a flat dull piece of phlegm, shap'd like a man" (II,1). Other characters are described as "gaudy glow-worms," "a hair-brain'd puppy," "running ulcers," "owls," "mungrils," and many other imaginative insults.

The play also contains a noteworthy reference to Galileo Galilei, as "Galateo, the Italian star-wright" (II,4).
