= Patricia Davies (codebreaker) =

British World War II code breaker

- Born: Ethel Patricia Owtram; 19 June 1923 (age 103); Lancaster, Lancashire, England
- Education: Somerville College
- Relatives: Jean Argles
- Military career
- Allegiance: United Kingdom
- Branch: WRENS
- Service years: 1942–1945
- Awards: Legion d'Honneur; Honorary Fellow, Somerville College

Patricia Davies (née Owtram; born 19 June 1923) is an English former codebreaker who served as a special duties linguist in the Women's Royal Naval Service during World War II. She and her younger sister Jean Argles are often referred to as "The Codebreaking Sisters". As a teenage interceptor, Davies listened to radio transmissions in both German and encrypted code as part of the British war effort, transcribing and decoding the messages and passing them on to Bletchley Park.

After the war, Davies was a television producer, journalist, and author. She was also an organiser of the Chiswick Women's Institute and a patron of the Sea Cadets. Until Argles died in 2023, the sisters were the last to have been required to sign the Official Secrets Act. In their later years they discovered that each had been doing top secret war work. In their nineties, they appeared frequently on radio and television relating stories of their wartime activities. Their book Codebreaking Sisters: Our Secret War became a best seller.

== Early life ==
Dorothy (née Daniel) and Carey Owtram had three children, Patricia, Jean, and Robert. Carey Owtram owned a cotton mill in Bolton, Lancashire, and the military-minded family lived in a large, countryside, sandstone house belonging to Carey Owtram's father. After being homeschooled, the children were sent to boarding school for a few years, Patricia Owtram leaving at 17 years old. In the 1930s, the Owtram family also employed an Austrian Jewish refugee, Lilly Getzel, as a cook after she left Austria escaping the Nazi dictatorship there. Patricia Owtram enjoyed spending her evenings with Getzel, who could not speak much English, and so Patricia learned enough of Getzel's native German language to achieve conversational fluency and proficiency in German. This helped her later in her interview for the Women's Royal Naval Service (WRNS). In 1939, Patricia Owtram gained her school certificate. As the war started, Dorothy Owtram, who had driven a truck for the Women's Land Army in the First World War, became an Air Raid Precautions warden. In 1941, Carey Owtram, having served in the Territorial Army, went to the Far East with his regiment. After the fall of Singapore in 1942, he was imprisoned in Japanese POW camps until the end of the war.

== Career ==
=== War service ===
In 1942, age 18, Patricia Owtram joined the WRNS. When it was discovered from the results of a WRNS German test that she spoke good conversational German, she signed the Official Secrets Act and, after two weeks of basic training and a further intensive specialist interception course, was promoted to petty officer and started work at the British navy's signals collection sites, called Y stations, around the coast. These stations were called Y, phonetically standing for WI, which in turn stood for "Wireless Intercept". They were where secret German military communications were intercepted, transcribed and, if in a code other than morse, passed on to Bletchley Park. Owtram's first post was in Yorkshire. She later transferred to Lyme Regis in 1943 as chief petty officer, and then to Dover (opposite Cap Gris-Nez) where she turned 21 two weeks after D Day. In Y stations, the WRNS worked in twos, round the clock, transcribing German military communications between ships, in the North Sea, the Baltic, or the Dover Straits depending on the regularly varied postings, and which were, for example, between ships and their base or between commanders and groups of ships.

Later she worked for the Supreme Headquarters Allied Expeditionary Force, in London under General Eisenhower, scanning German official documents to search for potential war criminals. She was offered a job as a translator at the Nuremberg trials but, at her mother's request, went home to be with her father who had returned after surviving his ordeal as a POW.

=== Civilian work ===
After the war, Davies was assistant archivist at the British embassy in Oslo, Norway. She studied English at University of St Andrews, graduating with a first class undergraduate Master of Arts (MA Hons) degree. She then undertook research on The Lady Mother by Henry Glapthorne at Somerville College, Oxford, matriculating in 1951. She graduated from the University of Oxford with a Bachelor of Letters (BLitt) degree in 1953. Her supervisor was Arthur Brown, an academic of University College London as no suitable Oxford academic was available. When her edition of The Lady Mother was published by the Malone Society in 1959, it was attributed to Brown with no mention of her; this academic injustice was only rectified in 2023. After Oxford, she held a study fellowship as an exchange student at Harvard University.

She was a journalist in Manchester for a time and a television producer for the then newly established Granada television. She was involved in the production of programmes such as Florizel Street (now known as Coronation Street), and was key in developing other well known programmes such as University Challenge, The Sky at Night where she worked and travelled with Patrick Moore, and Ask the Family. She retired in 1983.

In 2017, the Owtram sisters published the wartime diaries of their father, Colonel Cary Owtram, under the title of One thousand days on the River Kwai: The Secret Diary of a British Camp Commandant. This led to their giving talks at book festivals, and making radio and TV appearances.

In 2020, Pat Davies and Jean Argles published Codebreaking Sisters: Our Secret War, a book about their own wartime experiences, written under their maiden name of Owtram.

== Awards ==
Davies's war service was recognised with the Victory medal.

In 2009, the Labour government under Gordon Brown awarded the women who worked at Bletchley Park a Bletchley Badge.

Davies name is on a brick in the wall at Bletchley Park honouring those who worked in connection with the place.

June 2019, Davies was awarded the Légion d'honneur, Military, the highest order of merit in France.

In 2019, she was also granted the freedom of the Borough of Chiswick where she resides.

In 2024, she was elected honorary fellow of her alma mater, Somerville College, Oxford.

== Personal life ==
Throughout the war, the two Owtram sisters wrote letters to each other. Since both had signed the Official Secrets Act and had been involved in top secret work, it was not until the 1960s and 1970s, and after the publication of material about the work of Bletchley Park, that the two sisters talked to each other about their war work and discovered the similarities in their war experiences. Their parents never knew anything about the top secret war work that their daughters had undertaken.

Patricia Owtram was married to Ray Davies, a BBC journalist.

Still giving talks in 2023, to, for example, older groups in the University of the Third Age (U3A), Davies wrote, "It usually raises a laugh when I tell them that I may be the only old lady in Chiswick who knows how to use a Sten gun." (p. 292)

== Legacy ==
Details of Davies's life and work were recorded in Army Girls by Tessa Dunlop, published in 2021, and in both The Bletchley Girls 2015 and Elizabeth and Philip 2022 by the same author.

A portrait of the two sisters holding a telegram from their father was painted by Dan Llywelyn Hall.

There are seven films about Pat Davies in the Veterans Video Archive.

On Armistice Day 2022, aged 99, Davies joined Andrew Pierce and Tessa Dunlop for an interview about her wartime experiences.
