= Patricia Davies (engineer) =

British-American mechanical engineer

Patricia Davies is a British and American mechanical engineer whose publications have included research on vehicular noise and the mechanical properties of polyurethane foam in vehicular seating applications, such as in automobiles and aircraft. She is a professor emerita of mechanical engineering at Purdue University, a former director of the Ray W. Herrick Laboratories at Purdue, and a former president of the Institute of Noise Control Engineering.

== Education and career ==
Davies received a bachelor's degree from the University of Bristol in 1977. Continuing her studies at the University of Southampton, she received a master's degree in 1981 and completed her Ph.D. in 1985.

After continued postdoctoral research at Southampton, she joined Purdue in 1987, as the only female member of the mechanical engineering faculty. At Purdue, she became director of the Ray W. Herrick Laboratories from 2005 to 2019. She was president of the Institute of Noise Control Engineering from 2008 to 2010.

== Recognition ==
Davies was the 2016 recipient of the Per Bruel Gold Medal for Noise Control and Acoustics of the ASME, given "for exceptional leadership and educational mentorship in the field of noise control and acoustics; and for outstanding contributions to noise control engineering in the areas of signal processing, nonlinear dynamic modeling, product sound quality, and human response to noise and vibration".

She is a Fellow of the Institute of Noise Control Engineering, and in 2017 she was elected as a Fellow of the Acoustical Society of America, "for contributions to the fields of sound quality, aircraft noise, and the dynamic properties of foams".
