= TransPacific Hawaii College =

TransPacific Hawaii College was a private junior college located in Honolulu, Hawaii, United States. It was founded in 1977 and was initially known as the Kansai Gaidai Hawaii College, and the name was changed to TransPacific Hawaii College in 1998. The College closed its operation at the end of December 2008 due to financial reasons. The closure was a direct result of the College's accreditation body's (Accrediting Commission for Community and Junior Colleges of the Western Association of Schools and Colleges) dissatisfaction with the College's financial structure that relied the majority of its operating costs on its tuition income. The accreditation agency's financial concern resulted in a Show-Cause status, and the College decided to cease the operation.

The college was initially accredited on January 1, 1985 and the accreditation remained till the closure of the college on April 3, 2009.

Students' academic records are now maintained by the Kansai Gaidai University's Center for International Education.

The College conferred solely the Associate in Liberal Arts Degree. The typical enrollment of the College was 250, all international students mainly coming from Japan, Taiwan, and Thailand.

== Campus ==
The campus of the College was located in a residential community of Aina Haina district. The land, which was approx. 40,000 square feet (3,700 m^{2}), faced the eastern coast line of the island. There was a complex of four main buildings and it housed twenty classrooms, administrative offices, professors' offices, three computer labs, one learning resource lab, a student service center, and a library. There were beautiful ocean and mountains around TransPacific Hawaii College.
