= Henry Glapthorne =

17th-century English playwright and poet

Henry Glapthorne (baptised, 28 July 1610 – c. 1643) was an English dramatist and poet, baptized in Cambridgeshire, the son of Thomas Glapthorne and Faith née Hatcliff. His father was a bailiff of Lady Hatton, the wife of Sir Edward Coke. Before turning 14, Henry Glapthorne had matriculated as a pensioner at Corpus Christi College, Cambridge, but there is no record of him ever taking a degree. From then until he emerges as a playwright in the mid-1630s, little is known of him. There is evidence that he may have been employed as a groom-porter in a nobleman's household for some of that time – a later document refers to him as "Glapthorne the Porter" – but there is nothing conclusive.

== Writings ==
His best-regarded work is Argalus and Parthenia (c. 1633, printed 1639), based on Sidney's Arcadia. Other plays are the comedy The Hollander (licensed for performance 12 March 1636), Wit in a Constable (c. 1638), and the tragicomedy The Lady's Privilege (all printed 1640), and the historical tragedy Albertus Wallenstein (c. 1634–1639, printed 1639), based on a famous general in the Thirty Years' War.

Glapthorne published a volume of Poems in 1639, with a series addressed to "Lucinda", and a 1643 poem entitled "Whitehall" dedicated to Richard Lovelace, among other minor works. A collected edition, The Plays and Poems of Henry Glapthorne, appeared in 1874. In 1883, the editor A. H. Bullen attributed to Glapthorne the anonymous play The Lady Mother, written c. 1633–1635, which has been accepted by the consensus of critical opinion.

The play Revenge for Honour, first printed in 1654 and misattributed to George Chapman, may be another work of Glapthorne's; it was entered into the Stationers' Register on 29 November 1653, as his, under the title The Parricide, or Revenge for Honour. A play called The Parricide, was acted in 1624, but Glapthorne would have been only 14 years old at the time.

== Later years ==
On 1 July 1642, his daughter Lovelace (probably named in honour of his friend Richard Lovelace) was baptized in the City of London parish of St Bride's, Fleet Street; the record also mentions the name of Glapthorne's wife as Susan. On 23 March 1643, Susan was buried in the nearby parish of St Andrew's, Holborn, having died the day before in Fetter Lane. The location of her death confirms that Henry Glapthorne is the "one Glapthorne, who lived in Fetter Lane", who on 12 January 1643 was identified to the House of Lords as the author of the tract His Maiesties Gracious Answer to The Message sent from the Honourable Citie of London, concerning Peace (1643). He, his printer Richard Herne and others, were supposed to be brought in to give evidence on the subject a few weeks later, but no further record has been found of what happened to him. Gerald Eades Bentley believes it likely that he died before the Restoration.
