= Richard II (play) =

History play by William Shakespeare

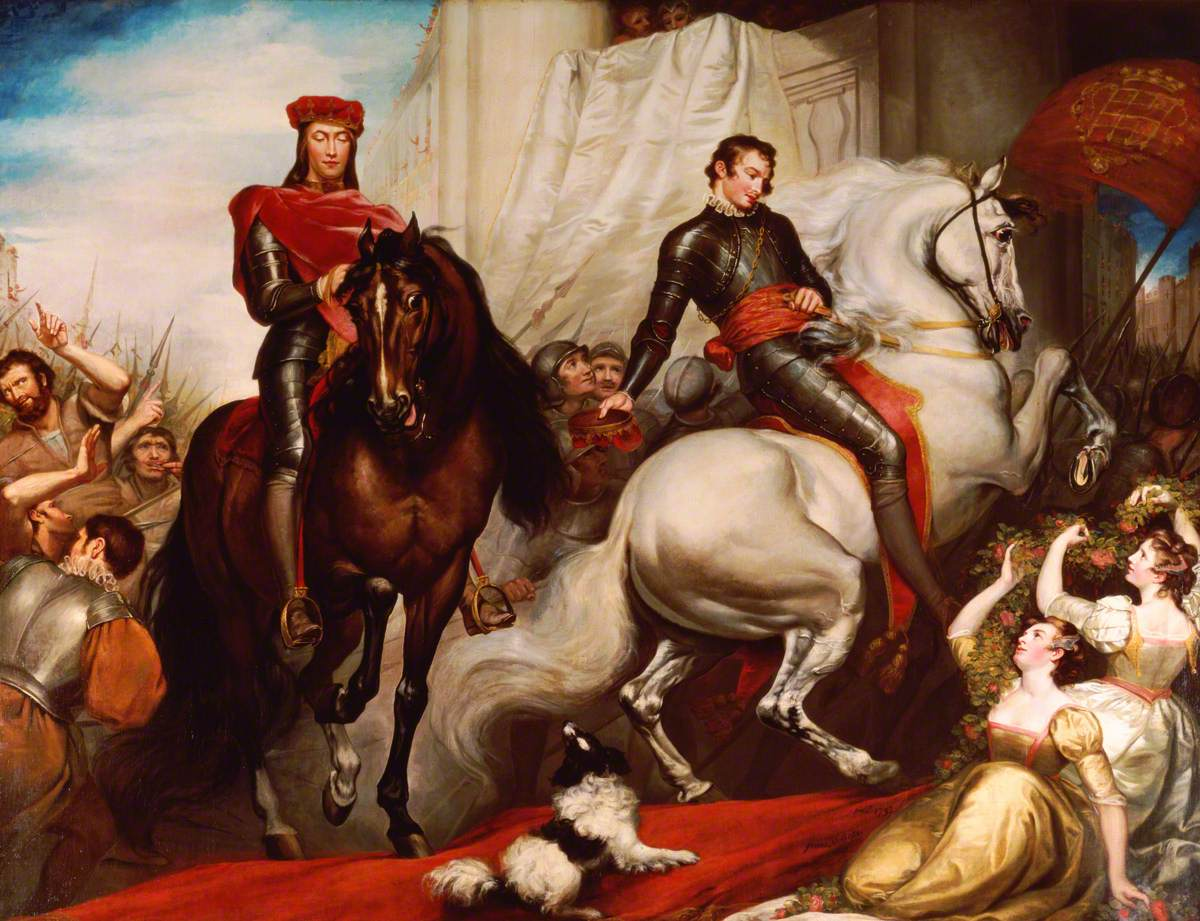
Richard II: The Entry of Richard and Bolingbroke into London, [Act V, Scene 2]. (James Northcote, 1793)

The Life and Death of King Richard the Second (1595), also Richard II, is a Shakespearean history play about the lifetime and reign of King Richard II of England (r. 1377–1399). As a dramatised period history of the English monarchy, Richard II chronicles the machinations of the noblemen of the royal court who conspire, precipitate, and realise the downfall and death of the King of England.

As the first work in the Henriad tetralogy of English history plays, the political narrative of Richard II is thematically followed throughout the stories of Henry IV, Part 1, Henry IV, Part 2, and Henry V, which also are histories of the reigns of his royal successors to the Throne of England. Although the First Folio (1623) classifies The Life and Death of Richard the Second as an English history play, the earlier Quarto edition (1597) classifies Richard II as a tragedy, under the title The Tragedie of King Richard the Second.

== Characters ==
- King Richard II
- John of Gaunt, Duke of Lancaster – Richard's uncle
- Duke of York – Richard's uncle
- Duke of Aumerle – York's son
- Thomas Mowbray, Duke of Norfolk
- Queen – Richard's wife (an unnamed composite of his first wife, Anne of Bohemia, and his second, Isabella of Valois, who was still a child at the time of his death)
- Duchess of York – York's wife (an unnamed composite of York's first wife, Isabella of Castile, and his second, Joan Holland)
- Duchess of Gloucester – widow of Thomas of Woodstock, Duke of Gloucester, uncle to the king

Rebels

- Henry Bolingbroke, Duke of Hereford — son of John of Gaunt
- Earl of Northumberland
- Henry 'Hotspur' Percy – Northumberland's son
- Lord Ross
- Lord Willoughby
- Lord Fitzwater
- Sir Piers Exton

Richard's allies

- Duke of Surrey
- Earl of Salisbury
- Lord Berkeley
- Bushy – favourite of Richard
- Bagot – favourite of Richard
- Green – favourite of Richard
- Bishop of Carlisle
- Abbot of Westminster
- Sir Stephen Scroop

Others

- Lord Marshal (post held in 1399 by Duke of Surrey, though this is not recognised in the play)
- Welsh captain
- Two heralds
- Gardener
- Gardener's man
- Queen's ladies
- Keeper – jailer at Pomfret prison
- Groom
- Attendants, lords, soldiers, messengers, etc.

== Synopsis ==
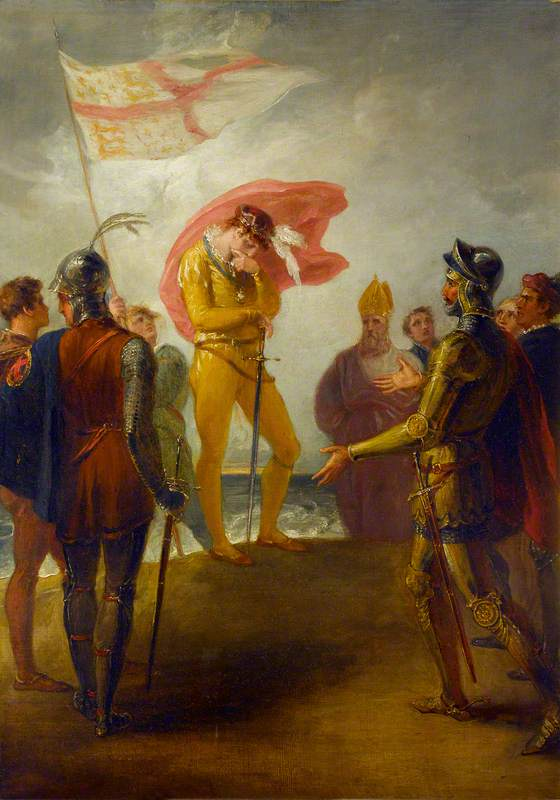
The Landing of Richard II at Milford Haven, William Hamilton (c.1793–1800)

The play spans only the last two years of Richard's life, from 1398 to 1400. It begins with King Richard sitting majestically on his throne in full state, having been requested to arbitrate a dispute between the nobles Thomas Mowbray and Richard's cousin, Henry Bolingbroke, who has accused Mowbray of high treason for stealing money that had been raised for the English army and of murdering Bolingbroke's uncle, the Duke of Gloucester. Bolingbroke's father, John of Gaunt, 1st Duke of Lancaster, meanwhile, believes Richard himself was responsible for his brother's murder. After several attempts to calm both men, Richard acquiesces and it is determined that the matter be resolved in the established method of trial by battle between Bolingbroke and Mowbray, despite Gaunt's objections.

The tournament scene is very formal, with a long, ceremonial introduction, but as the combatants are about to fight, Richard interrupts and sentences both men to banishment from England. Bolingbroke is originally sentenced to ten years' banishment, but Richard reduces this to six years upon seeing John of Gaunt's grieving face. Mowbray is banished permanently. The king's decision can be seen as the first mistake in a series leading eventually to his overthrow and death, since the error highlights many of his character flaws, including indecisiveness (in terms of whether to allow the duel to go ahead), abruptness (Richard waits until the last possible moment to cancel the duel), and arbitrariness (there is no apparent reason Bolingbroke should be allowed to return and Mowbray not). In addition, the decision fails to dispel the suspicions surrounding Richard's involvement in the death of the Duke of Gloucester—in fact, by handling the situation in such a cavalier and arbitrary manner, Richard only appears more guilty. Mowbray correctly predicts that the king will sooner or later fall at the hands of Bolingbroke.

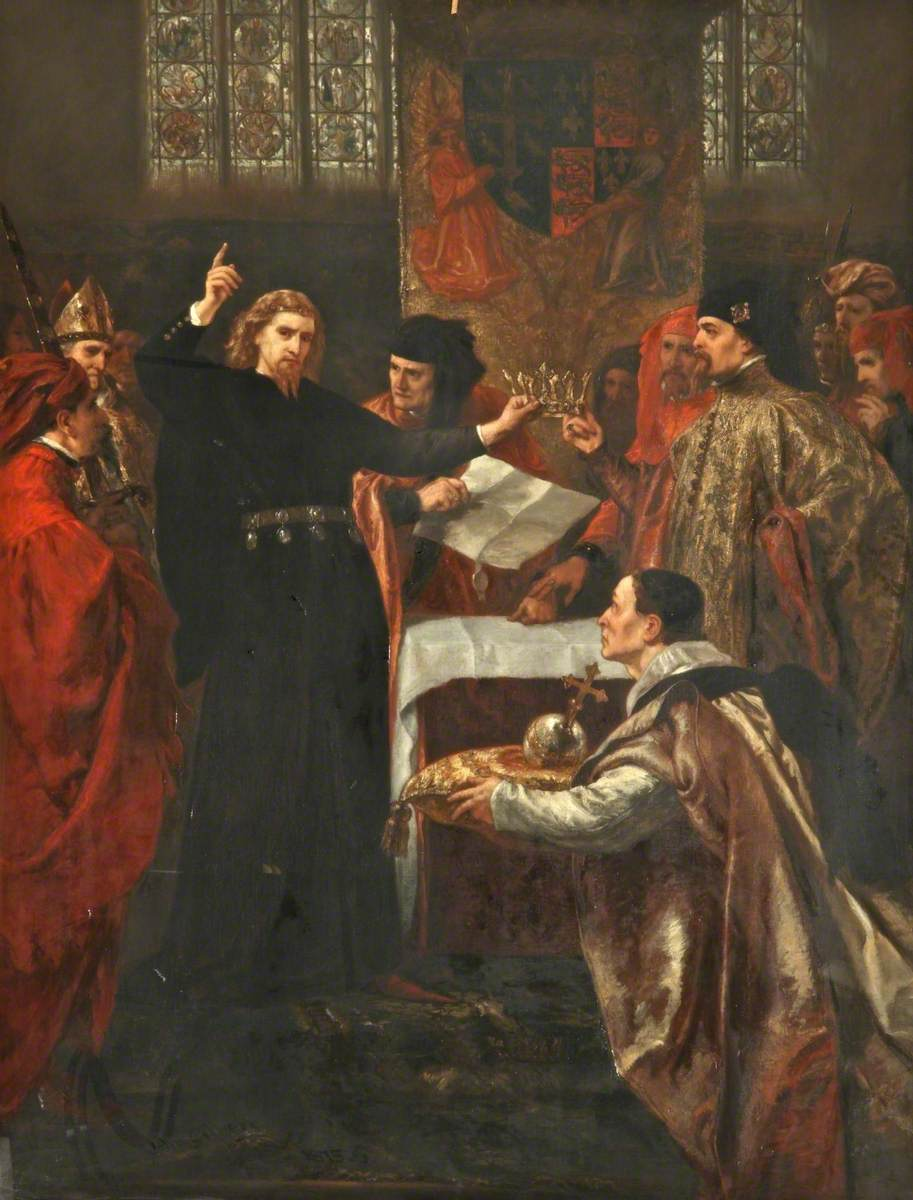
Richard II Resigning the Crown to Bolingbroke, John Gilbert (1875–76)

After an impassioned invective against the visiting king from his sick-bed, John of Gaunt dies and Richard seizes all his land and money. This angers the nobility, who accuse Richard of wasting England's money, of illegally depriving John's heir Bolingbroke of his rightful inheritance to fund war in Ireland, of imposing unjust taxes on the commoners, and of enriching himself by fining the nobles for crimes their ancestors committed. The conspirators help Bolingbroke return secretly to England, with a plan to overthrow Richard. There remain, however, subjects loyal to the king. Among them are the courtiers Bushy, Bagot, and Green, as well as the Duke of Aumerle (son of the Duke of York), cousin of both Richard and Bolingbroke. When Richard leaves England to attend to the war in Ireland, Bolingbroke seizes the opportunity to assemble an army and invades the north coast of England. Executing both Bushy and Green, Bolingbroke wins over the Duke of York, whom Richard has left in charge of his government in his absence.

Upon Richard's return, Bolingbroke reclaims his lands and lays claim to the English throne; Richard's Welsh allies desert him and he is taken captive. After a dramatic public ceremony where Bolingbroke has the captive king publicly renounce his crown, he crowns himself King Henry IV, and has Richard imprisoned in the castle of Pomfret. Aumerle orchestrates an uprising against the new king, only to be thwarted by his father, York. The King executes every conspirator except Aumerle, who is spared after the Duchess of York intervenes on his behalf. The ambitious Sir Piers Exton takes King Henry's words "Have I no friend will rid me of this living fear?" as a request to kill the still-living Richard. Exton murders Richard in his cell to gain Henry's favour. While admitting that he "did wish [Richard] dead", King Henry is appalled by the murder, dismisses Exton from his court, and vows a pilgrimage to Jerusalem to cleanse himself of his part in Richard's death. In his final lines, Henry completes the tragic structure of the play by mourning over Richard's coffin.

== Sources ==
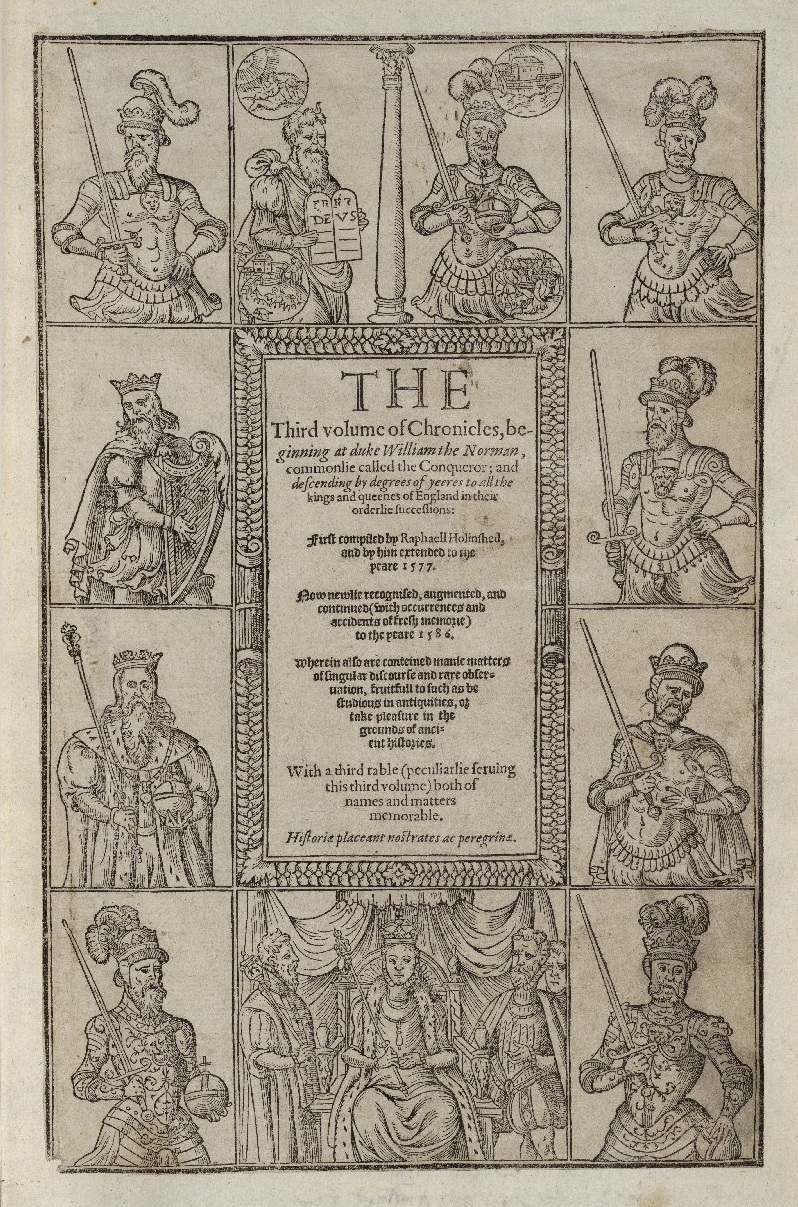
The 1587 edition of Holinshed's Chronicles

The Chroniques of Jean Froissart, a fourteenth-century account of the Hundred Years' War translated into English by John Bouchier in c. 1524, includes a sympathetic account of the deposition of King Richard. It is likely that this was one of Shakespeare's sources for the play. Shakespeare's primary source for Richard II, as for most of his chronicle histories, was Raphael Holinshed's Chronicles of England, Scotlande, and Irelande; the publication of the second edition in 1587 provides a terminus post quem for the play. Edward Hall's The Union of the Two Illustrious Families of Lancaster and York appears also to have been consulted, and scholars have also supposed Shakespeare familiar with Samuel Daniel's poem on the civil wars.

A somewhat more complicated case is presented by the anonymous play sometimes known as The First Part of Richard II. This play, which exists in one incomplete manuscript copy (at the British Museum), is subtitled Thomas of Woodstock, and scholars since F. S. Boas have usually called it by that name. This play treats the events leading up to the start of Shakespeare's play (though the two texts do not have identical characters). This closeness, along with the manuscript's anonymity, have led certain scholars to attribute all or part of the play to Shakespeare, though many critics view it as a secondary influence on Shakespeare, not as his work.

Shakespeare may have drawn from his contemporary Christopher Marlowe's historical play Edward II for Richard II. The two plays have similar structures, and critics have drawn parallels between particular passages and themes, such as the contradiction between the king's theoretical absolute power and the actual restraints placed on him by his subjects. Charles Lamb opined that "The reluctant pangs of abdicating Royalty in Edward furnished hints which Shakespeare scarce improved in his Richard the Second".

== Date and text ==
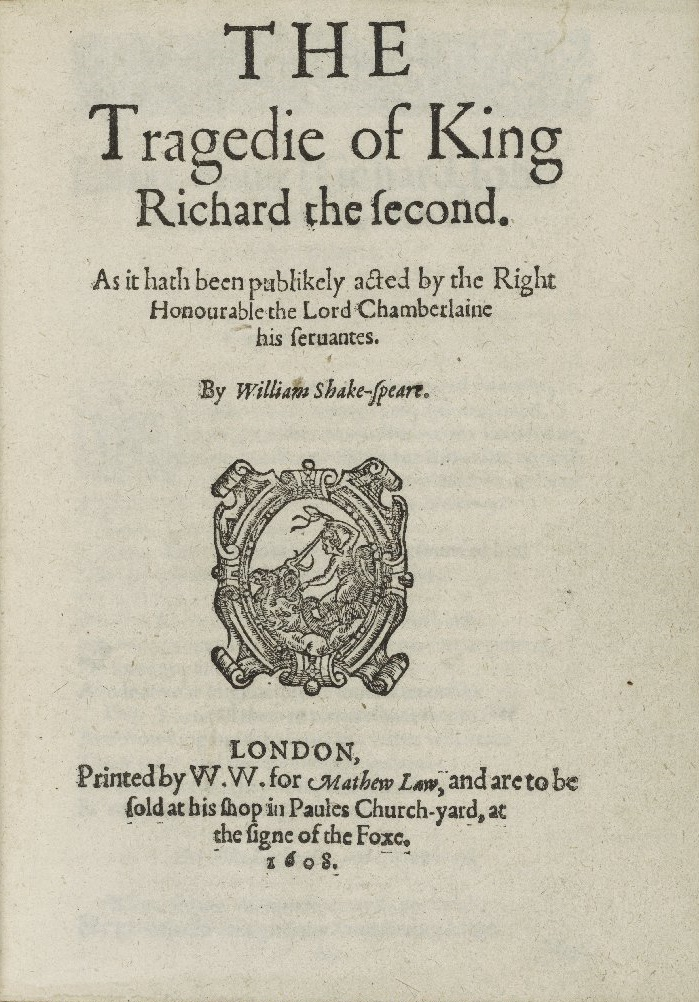
The title page from the 1608 quarto

The earliest recorded performance of Richard II was a private one, in Canon Row, the house of Edward Hoby, on 9 December 1595. The play was entered into the Register of the Stationers Company on 29 August 1597 by the bookseller Andrew Wise; he published the first quarto later that year, printed by Valentine Simmes. The second and third quartos followed in 1598—the only time a Shakespeare play was printed in three editions in two years. Q4 followed in 1608 and Q5 in 1615. The play was next published in the First Folio in 1623.

Richard II exists in a number of variations. The quartos vary to some degree, and the folio presents further differences. The first three quartos (printed in 1597 and 1598, commonly assumed to have been prepared from Shakespeare's holograph) lack the deposition scene. The fourth, published in 1608, includes a version of the scene shorter than the one later printed, presumably from a prompt-book, in the First Folio. The scant evidence makes explaining these differences largely conjectural. Traditionally, it has been supposed that the quartos lack the deposition scene because of censorship, by either the playhouse or the Master of the Revels Edmund Tylney, and that the Folio version may better reflect Shakespeare's original intentions. But there is no external evidence for this hypothesis, and the title page of the 1608 quarto claims to be presented "as it hath been publicly acted" (although, again, this could be due to earlier censorship that was later relaxed).

== Analysis and criticism ==
=== Structure and language ===
The play is divided into five acts and its structure is as formal as its language. It has a double complementary plot describing Richard II's fall and the rise of Bolingbroke, later known as Henry IV. Critic John R. Elliott Jr. notes that this play can be distinguished from the other history plays because it has an ulterior political purpose. Shakespearean tragedy's normal structure is modified to portray a central political theme: the rise of Bolingbroke to the throne and the conflict between Richard and Bolingbroke over the kingship. In Acts IV and V, Shakespeare includes incidents irrelevant to Richard's fate that are resolved in the future plays of the Richard II–Henry V tetralogy.

The literary critic Hugh M. Richmond notes that Richard's beliefs about the divine right of kings tend to fall more in line with the medieval view of the throne. Bolingbroke, on the other hand, represents a more modern view of statecraft, arguing that not only bloodline but also intellect and political skill qualify a king. Richard believes that as king he is chosen and guided by God: not subject to human frailty, he is entitled to absolute authority over his subjects. Elliott argues that this conceited notion of his role ultimately leads to Richard's failure, adding that Bolingbroke's ability to relate and speak with the middle and lower classes allows him to take the throne.

Although it is largely historically accurate, Richard II is a tragedy. Richard II follows the arc of most of Shakespeare's tragedies: a series of catastrophes lead to a death, which resolves in forgiveness. A long line of mistakes, mostly on the part of Richard himself, lead to his incarceration and murder. But when his body is presented to Henry IV, the now-king declares, "although I did wish him dead, I hate the murderer, love the murderèd." This line affords Richard absolution and cements this play's place among Shakespeare's tragedies.

Unusually for Shakespeare, Richard II is written entirely in verse, one of only four of his plays, the others being King John and the first and third parts of Henry VI. There are also great differences in the characters' use of language. Traditionally, Shakespeare distinguishes social classes by having the upper classes speak in poetry while the lower classes speak in prose. In Richard II, there is no prose, but Richard uses flowery, metaphorical language in his speeches, whereas Bolingbroke, also of the noble class, uses a more plain and direct language. Besides the usual blank verse (unrhymed pentameters), there are long stretches of heroic couplets (pairs of rhymed pentameters). The play contains a number of memorable metaphors, including the extended comparison of England with a garden in Act III, Scene iv and of its reigning king to a lion or to the sun in Act IV.

The language of Richard II is more eloquent than that of the earlier history plays, and serves to set the tone and themes of the play. Shakespeare uses lengthy verses, metaphors, similes and soliloquies to delineate Richard's character as analytical rather than active. He always speaks in tropes, using analogies such as the sun as a symbol of his kingly status. Richard is obsessed with symbols: his crown, the symbol of his royal power, is of more concern to him than his actual kingly duties.

=== Historical context ===
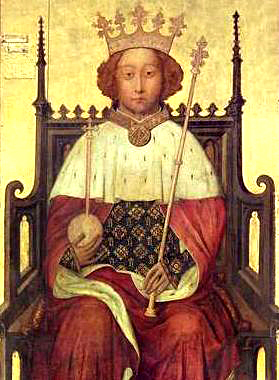
Coronation portrait of Richard II at Westminster Abbey, mid 1390s

The play was performed and published late in the reign of Elizabeth I, at a time when the queen's advanced age made succession an important political concern. The historical parallels in the succession of Richard II may not have been intended as political comment on the contemporary situation, with the weak Richard II analogous to Queen Elizabeth and an implicit argument in favour of her replacement by a monarch capable of creating a stable dynasty, but lawyers investigating John Hayward's historical work The First Part of the Life and Raigne of King Henrie IV, a book previously believed to have taken from Shakespeare's Richard II, made this connection. Samuel Schoenbaum contests that Hayward had written his work before Richard II, joking that "there is nothing like a hypothetical manuscript to resolve an awkwardness of chronology", as Hayward noted he had written the work several years before its publication. Hayward dedicated his version to Robert Devereux, 2nd Earl of Essex, and when Essex was arrested for rebellion in February 1601 Hayward had already been imprisoned, to strengthen the case against the earl for "incitement to the deposing of the Queen". That Hayward had made his dedication was fortunate for Shakespeare; otherwise he too might have lost his liberty over the affair.

Shakespeare's play appears to have played a minor role in the events surrounding the final downfall of Essex. On 7 February 1601, just before the uprising, supporters of the Earl of Essex, among them Charles and Joscelyn Percy (younger brothers of the Earl of Northumberland), paid for a performance at the Globe Theatre on the eve of their armed rebellion. By this agreement, reported at the trial of Essex by the Chamberlain's Men actor Augustine Phillips, the conspirators paid the company forty shillings "above the ordinary" (i.e., above their usual rate) to stage this play, which the players felt was too old and "out of use" to attract a large audience. Eleven of Essex's supporters attended the Saturday performance.

Elizabeth was aware of the political ramifications of the story of Richard II: according to a well-known but dubious anecdote, in August 1601 she was reviewing historical documents relating to the reign of Richard II when she supposedly remarked to her archivist William Lambarde, "I am Richard II, know ye not that?" In the same historical report the Queen is said to have complained that the play was performed forty times in "open streets and houses" but there is no extant evidence to corroborate this tale. At any rate, the Lord Chamberlain's Men do not appear to have suffered for their association with the Essex group; but they were commanded to perform it for the Queen on Shrove Tuesday in 1601, the day before Essex's execution.

=== Themes and motifs ===
==== The King's Two Bodies ====
In his analysis of medieval political theology, The King’s Two Bodies, Ernst Kantorowicz describes medieval kings as containing two bodies: a body natural, and a body politic. The theme of the king's two bodies is pertinent throughout Richard II, from the exile of Bolingbroke to the deposition of King Richard II. The body natural is a mortal body, subject to all the weaknesses of mortal human beings. On the other hand, the body politic is a spiritual body which cannot be affected by mortal infirmities such as disease and old age. These two bodies form one indivisible unit, with the body politic superior to the body natural.

Many critics agree that in Richard II, this central theme of the king's two bodies unfolds in three main scenes: the scenes at the Coast of Wales, at Flint Castle, and at Westminster. At the coast of Wales, Richard has just returned from a trip to Ireland and kisses the soil of England, demonstrating his kingly attachment to his kingdom. This image of kingship gradually fades as Bolingbroke's rebellion continues. Richard starts to forget his kingly nature as his mind becomes occupied by the rebellion. This change is portrayed in the scene at Flint Castle during which the unity of the two bodies disintegrates and the king starts to use more poetic and symbolic language. Richard's body politic has been shaken as his followers have joined Bolingbroke's army, diminishing Richard's military capacity. He has been forced to give up his jewels, losing his kingly appearance. He loses his temper at Bolingbroke, but then regains his composure as he starts to remember his divine side. At Flint Castle, Richard is determined to hang onto his kingship even though the title no longer fits his appearance. However, at Westminster the image of the divine kingship is supported by the Bishop of Carlisle rather than Richard, who at this point is becoming mentally unstable as his authority slips away. Biblical references are used to liken the humbled king to the humbled Christ. The names of Judas and Pilate are used to further extend this comparison. Before Richard is sent to his death, he "un-kings" himself by giving away his crown, sceptre, and the balm that is used to anoint a king to the throne. The mirror scene is the final end to the dual personality. After examining his plain physical appearance, Richard shatters the mirror on the ground and thus relinquishes his past and present as king. Stripped of his former glory, Richard finally releases his body politic and retires to his body natural and his own inner thoughts and griefs. Critic J. Dover Wilson notes that Richard's double nature as man and martyr is the dilemma that runs through the play eventually leading to Richard's death. Richard acts the part of a royal martyr, and due to the spilling of his blood, England continually undergoes civil war for the next two generations.

==== The rise of a Machiavellian king ====
The play ends with the rise of Bolingbroke to the throne, marking the start of a new era in England. According to historical research, an English translation of Machiavelli's The Prince might have existed as early as 1585, influencing the reigns of the kings of England. Critic Irving Ribner notes that a manifestation of Machiavellian philosophy may be seen in Bolingbroke. Machiavelli wrote The Prince during a time of political chaos in Italy, and writes down a formula by which a leader can lead the country out of turmoil and return it to prosperity. Bolingbroke seems to be a leader coming into power at a time England is in turmoil, and follows closely the formula stated by Machiavelli. At the start of Richard II, Bolingbroke accuses Mowbray and ulteriorly attacks the government of King Richard. He keeps Northumberland by his side as a tool to control certain constituents. From the minute Bolingbroke comes into power, he destroys the faithful supporters of Richard such as Bushy, Green and the Earl of Wiltshire. Also, Bolingbroke is highly concerned with the maintenance of legality to the kingdom, an important principle of Machiavellian philosophy, and therefore makes Richard surrender his crown and physical accessories to erase any doubt as to the real heir to the throne. Yet, Irving Ribner still notes a few incidents where Bolingbroke does not follow true Machiavellian philosophy, such as his failure to destroy Aumerle, but such incidents are minuscule compared with the bigger events of the play. Even Bolingbroke's last statement follows Machiavellian philosophy as he alludes to making a voyage to the Holy Land, since Machiavellian philosophy states rulers must appear pious. Therefore, this particular play can be viewed as a turning point in the history of England as the throne is taken over by a more commanding king in comparison to King Richard II.

=== As a comedy ===
Some scholars have interpreted the play as a kind of comedy. John Halverson writes:

Seen without tragic spectacles, the play looks more comic than tragic, at least in the broad sense that theater of the absurd is essentially comic. Richard II is more than anything else a study of absurdity: rhetorical, historical and political. Its famous poetry mocks itself by serving shallow thoughts; ceremony is trivialized; treason is presented farcically; majesty is reduced to rhetoric and posturing.

According to Halverson, there is no moment in the play where Richard achieves "self-knowledge" through suffering, which some commentators view as central to "real" tragedy. Richard is seen suffering, but he never acknowledges any of his errors and never really identifies himself as anything but the King. Halverson argues that the play itself is not trying to be a tragedy, but rather the character of Richard pretends to the role of tragic hero, "a role that no one else in the play takes seriously". Richard unconsciously mocks himself, and Shakespeare "ridicules 'divine right' and deflates 'majesty' " in the play.

Harry Berger also sees comedic elements in the play, but argues that the character of Richard is self-conscious, conspicuously making errors and then blaming it on others as "acts of parody". Rather than being a believer in the divine right of kings, Richard "shows contempt for an ideology of sacralized kingship powerless to restrain his abuses". He intentionally contributes to his own downfall, which Berger interprets as the expression of a desire for a deserved punishment.

== Performance history ==
On 9 December 1595, Sir Robert Cecil enjoyed "K. Richard" at Sir Edward Hoby's house in Canon Row, and it might have been Shakespeare's Richard II, although some suspected that it was a different play, a painting, or a historical document.

Another commissioned performance of a different type occurred at the Globe Theatre on 7 February 1601. This was the performance paid for by supporters of the Earl of Essex's planned revolt (see § Historical context above).

It is said that on 30 September 1607, the crew of Capt. William Keeling performed Richard II aboard the British East India Company ship The Red Dragon, off Sierra Leone, but the authenticity of this record is doubted.

The play was performed at the Globe on 12 June 1631.

The play retained its political charge in the Restoration: a 1680 adaptation at Drury Lane by Nahum Tate was suppressed for its perceived political implications. Tate attempted to mask his version, called The Sicilian Usurper, with a foreign setting; he attempted to blunt his criticism of the Stuart court by highlighting Richard's noble qualities and downplaying his weaknesses. Neither expedient prevented the play from being "silenc'd on the third day", as Tate wrote in his preface. Lewis Theobald staged a successful and less troubled adaptation in 1719 at Lincoln's Inn Fields; Shakespeare's original version was revived at Covent Garden in 1738.

The play had limited popularity in the early twentieth century, but John Gielgud exploded onto the world's theatrical consciousness through his performance as Richard at the Old Vic Theatre in 1929, returning to the character in 1937 and 1953 in what ultimately was considered as the definitive performance of the role. Another legendary Richard was Maurice Evans, who first played the role at the Old Vic in 1934 and then created a sensation in his 1937 Broadway performance, revived it in New York in 1940 and then immortalised it on television for the Hallmark Hall of Fame in 1954. In England, Paul Scofield, who played the role at the Old Vic in 1952, was considered the definitive Richard of more modern times. In the 1968–1970 seasons of the Prospect Theatre Company, Ian McKellen made a breakthrough performance as Richard, opposite Timothy West as Bolingbroke. The production, directed by Richard Cottrell, toured Britain and Europe, featuring in the Edinburgh Festival in 1969 and on BBC TV in 1970. In 1973 Ian Richardson and Richard Pasco alternated the roles of Richard and Bolingbroke in a production from John Barton at the Royal Shakespeare Theatre; nearly fifty years later this was still a standard by which performances were being judged. One of the most accessible versions was the 1978 television production by the BBC of the play, shown as part of "The Shakespeare Plays" (a several years-long project to put all of Shakespeare's plays on videotape). This version, still available on DVD, starred Derek Jacobi as Richard, with John Gielgud making an appearance as John of Gaunt. In 1997, Fiona Shaw played the role as a man. More recently, the play was staged by Trevor Nunn in modern costume at the Old Vic in 2005, with Kevin Spacey in the title role, and by Michael Grandage at the Donmar Warehouse in 2011–12 with Eddie Redmayne in the title role.

The role was played by Mark Rylance in an all-male production at Shakespeare's Globe in 2003. The play returned to the Globe in 2015 with Charles Edwards in the title role.

In summer 2012, BBC Two broadcast a filmed adaptation together with other plays in the Henriad under the series title The Hollow Crown with Ben Whishaw as Richard II.

The Royal Shakespeare Company produced the play with David Tennant in the lead role in 2013. It has been released as a Cineplex Odeon special worldwide movie event. Tennant reprised the role for his U.S. stage debut, at BAM, in April 2016. The Almeida Theatre, Islington, London, produced the play with Simon Russell Beale in the lead role in 2019. Jonathan Bailey played the lead role at the Bridge Theatre in London, beginning in February 2025.

No film version created specifically for cinema release has been made. The 1949 film Train of Events includes a sub-plot featuring an amateur dramatics society performing the last scenes of Richard II.

John Gielgud recorded his legendary performance of the title role for Caedmon Records, with Keith Michell as Bolingbroke and Rachel Gurney as the Queen. An abridged recording, part of the Living Shakespeare series, starred Michael Redgrave, with Nigel Davenport as Bolingbroke and Redgrave's wife Rachel Kempson as the Queen.

== See also ==
- List of screen adaptations of Richard II

== Bibliography ==
=== Editions of Richard II ===
- Bate, Jonathan and Rasmussen, Eric (eds.), Richard II (The RSC Shakespeare; London: Macmillan, 2010)
- Black, Matthew W. (ed.) The Tragedy of King Richard the Second (The Pelican Shakespeare; London, Penguin, 1957; revised edition 1970)
- Dawson, Anthony B. and Yachnin, Paul (eds.) Richard II (The Oxford Shakespeare; Oxford: Oxford University Press, 2012)
- Dolan, Frances E. (ed.) Richard II (The Pelican Shakespeare, 2nd edition; London, Penguin, 2000)
- Dover Wilson, John (ed.) Richard II (The New Shakespeare; Cambridge: Cambridge University Press, 1939; 2nd edition, 1951)
- Edmondson, Paul (ed.) Richard II (The New Penguin Shakespeare 2nd edition; London: Penguin, 2008)
- Evans, G. Blakemore (ed.) The Riverside Shakespeare (Boston: Houghton Mifflin, 1974; 2nd edn., 1997)
- Forker, Charles R., ed. (2002). King Richard II. The Arden Shakespeare, 3rd Series. London: Arden.
- Greenblatt, Stephen; Cohen, Walter; Howard, Jean E. and Maus, Katharine Eisaman (eds.) The Norton Shakespeare: Based on the Oxford Shakespeare (London: Norton, 1997)
- Gurr, Andrew (ed.) King Richard II (The Cambridge Shakespeare; Cambridge: Cambridge University Press, 1984; 2nd edition 2003)
- Mowat, Barbara A; Werstine, Paul (1996). Richard II. New York: Simon & Schuster. ISBN 978-0-7434-8491-6.
- Muir, Kenneth (ed.) Richard II (Signet Classic Shakespeare; New York: Signet, 1963; revised edition, 1988; 2nd revised edition 1999)
- Powell, Ivor B. (ed.) King Richard II (The Arden Shakespeare, 1st Series; London: Arden, 1912)
- Ure, Peter (ed.) King Richard II (The Arden Shakespeare, 2nd Series; London: Arden, 1956)
- Wells, Stanley (ed.) Richard II (The New Penguin Shakespeare; London: Penguin, 1969; revised edition 1997)
- Wells, Stanley; Taylor, Gary; Jowett, John and Montgomery, William (eds.) The Oxford Shakespeare: The Complete Works (Oxford: Oxford University Press, 1986; 2nd edn., 2005)

=== Secondary sources ===
- Barroll, Leeds. "A New History for Shakespeare and His Time." Shakespeare Quarterly 39 (1988), 441–444.
- Bergeron, David. "The Deposition Scene in Richard II." Renaissance Papers 1974, 31–37.
- Bullough, Geoffrey. "Narrative and Dramatic Sources of Shakespeare". Early English History Plays: Henry VI Richard III Richard II, volume III, Routledge: London, New York, 1960.
- Huke, Ivan and Perkins, Derek. Richard II: Literature Revision Notes and Examples. Celtic Revision Aids. 1981. ISBN 0-17-751304-7.
- Chambers, E. K. William Shakespeare: A Study of Facts and Problems. 2 Volumes. Oxford: Clarendon Press, 1930.
- Halverson, John (1994). "The Lamentable Comedy of Richard II". English Literary Renaissance. 24 (2): 343–369. doi:10.1111/j.1475-6757.1994.tb01085.x. ISSN 1475-6757.
- Rose, Alexander. Kings in the North – The House of Percy in British History. Phoenix/Orion Books Ltd, 2002, ISBN 1-84212-485-4
- Smitd, Kristian. Unconformities in Shakespeare's History Plays, St. Martin's Press: New York, 1993.
- Tillyard, E. M. W. Shakespeare's History Plays, Chatto & Windus: London, 1944.
