= William Horman =

William Horman (c. 1440 – April 1535) was a headmaster at Eton and Winchester College in the early Tudor period of English history. He is best known for his Latin grammar textbook the Vulgaria, which created controversy at the time due to its unconventional approach in first giving examples of translations of English writings on different topics, and later discussing the rules of grammar. He asserted, probably following Quintilian, that grammar cannot be perfect without music.

== Life ==
Horman was born in Salisbury, Wiltshire, England around 1440. He was admitted as a pupil at Wykeham's college at Winchester in 1468. According to some accounts, he studied at the University of Cambridge. However, in 1477 he was elected a fellow of New College, Oxford, in the same year that William Caxton printed his first book in England. He took a Masters of Arts degree, and in 1485 became the headmaster of Eton. He left Eton in 1494, and became headmaster of Winchester from 1495 to 1501. At that time, the Winchester post was more prestigious and paid better. Later, Horman returned to Eton as a fellow and vice-provost, where there is evidence that both Greek and Latin were taught. He continued there until his death.

When he was almost eighty years old, in 1519 Horman published the Vulgaria, a Latin textbook. He says in the introduction that he composed the book when a schoolmaster, "many years before". In a contract dated 28 June 1519, he ordered Richard Pynson to produce 800 whole and perfect copies of these Latin texts, in 35 chapters. The contract is notable as one of the earliest surviving agreements of this nature.

Horman became an antagonist in the Grammarians' War, which erupted when Robert Whittington attacked the new approach of teaching by example. Whittington at the time was England's leading author of textbooks, and preferred the traditional system of learning the precepts of grammar by rote before progressing to examples. In some ways Horman was more traditional than Whittington, since he rejected the common vocabulary of Medieval Latin and idealised the "pure" Ciceronian form of Latin while Whittington was more pragmatic in his views.

Horman died in April 1535, when in his nineties, an extreme old age for the time.

== Work ==
The Vulgaria is the more important of Horman's surviving works, a Latin textbook based on humanist principles published in 1519. The book was dedicated to William Atwater, Bishop of Lincoln. The preface of the book included verses by William Lilye and by Robert Aldrich, the master at Eton from 1515 to 1521. The name Vulgaria is used in the Latin sense of "common things", in this case "everyday sayings". The book is a collection of English sentences followed by their Latin translations, covering subjects related to school, manners, upbringing, religion, natural history and many other subjects. The textbook is not radically different from previous Latin grammars, differing mainly in its arrangement by subject rather than by grammatical structure. In this, it followed the principles laid out by Erasmus.

The Vulgaria draws from a variety of sources, for example including the saying "It does no good for all truth to be told nor all wrong imputed" derived from the Old English Durham Proverbs. Another example of a proverb to be translated is "Somtyme of a myshappe cometh a good turne". The proverb "necessity is the mother of invention" appears, perhaps for the first time in English, translated as "Mater artium necessitas". Other sayings included the advice not to "offereth a candell to the deuyll", to remember that "many a ragged colt proued to a good horse", "it is better a chylde unborne than untaught", "manners maketh man" and "one scabbed shepe marreth a hole flocke". "That the whiche muste be wyll be" reflects the Spanish "Que Sera, Sera". The book gives practical advice. "At a soden shyfte leere [empty] barellis, tyed together, with boardis above, make passage over a streme". He says that alleys in gardens, covered with vines, "do great pleasure with the shadow in parchynge heat, and clusters of grapis maketh a pleasant walkynge alley".

The Vulgaria is interesting in the light that it throws on the times. For example, the book is the first to mention "ceruse", a mixture of white lead and vinegar used by wealthy women to whiten their skin. The book defines blotting paper: "Blottynge papyr serveth to drye weete wryttynge, lest there be made blottis or blurris". Children's rattles are first mentioned in the book. He describes the use of wooden swords, or "wasters", used for training: "Let us pley at buckeler and at waster in feyre game". The sentence "We wyll playe with a ball full of wynde" (which Horman translates as "lusui erit nobis follis pugillari spritu tumens") is one of the earliest references to the game of football being played at public schools. He praised the value of sports in letting children find an outlet for their energy as a break from their studies: "There muste be a measure in gyuynge of remedies or sportynge to chyldren, leste they be wery of goynge to theyr boke if they haue none, or waxe slacke if they haue to many".

Horman's Antibossicon G. Hormani ad G. Lilium published in 1521 is a riposte to criticism of the Vulgaria. It takes the form of a series of letters to Horman, and from him to William Lilye, another grammarian who supported the new teaching approach. Lilye also published an Antibossicum, and the two were published together as a pamphlet. In his Apologeticon contra Rob. Whittingtoni Protova tis Angliæ incivilem indoctamque criminationem, he dissected some of Whittington's poetry and treated it to severe criticism. Horman also translated several of the Greek classics and wrote various treatises on philosophy and science, but these have not survived.

== Bibliography ==
- Horman, William (1519). Vulgaria Uiri Doctissimi Guil. Hormani Caesariburgensis. BiblioLife. ISBN 978-1-171-33962-5.

== Sources ==
- Abate, Michelle Ann (1 January 2005). "Oversight as Insight: Reading The Second Shepherd's Play". Early Theatre. 8 (1): 95–108. doi:10.12745/et.8.1.694. ISSN 2293-7609.
- Bailey, L. H. (1963). "Pergola". Standard Cyclopedia of Horticulture. MacMillan Co.
- Bailey, Steven (May 1995). "Living Sports History: Football at Winchester, Eton and Harrow". Sports Historian. 15: 23–33. doi:10.1080/17460269508551675. Archived from the original on 17 May 2007.
- Barnes, Stapleton A. (1906). Wiseman, Nicholas Patrick (ed.). "Winchester Mother of Schools". The Dublin Review. 139. W. Spooner: 383–399.
- Burgess, Clive; Heale, Martin (2008). The late medieval English college and its context. Boydell & Brewer. ISBN 978-1-903153-22-2.
- Carlson, David R. (August 1991). "Skelton's Garland of Laurel and Robert Whittinton's 'Lauri Apud Palladem expostulatio'". The Review of English Studies. New Series. 42 (167): 417–424. doi:10.1093/res/xlii.167.417. JSTOR 518351.
- Clements, John (1999). "Get Thee a Waster!". The Association for Renaissance Martial Arts.
- Clogan, Paul Maurice (2004). Humanist educational theory, Gregory the Great, and culinary comedy. Rowman & Littlefield. ISBN 978-0-7425-3416-2.
- Collins, William Lucas (February 1865). "Etonia, Ancient and Modern. – Part I". Blackwood's Edinburgh Magazine. 97.
- Davies, Myles (1716). Athenae Britannicae, or, A critical history of the Oxford and Cambridge writers and writings, . pp. 24–25.
- Fenlon, Iain (1981). Music in medieval and early modern Europe: patronage, sources, and texts. Cambridge University Press. ISBN 978-0-521-23328-6.
- Fox, Adam (2000). Oral and literate culture in England, 1500–1700. Oxford studies in social history. Clarendon Press. ISBN 978-0-19-820512-8.
- Furnivall, Frederick James (April 1867). "Pynson's contracts with Horman for his Vulgaria, and Palsgrave for his Lesclaircissement, with Pynson's letter of denization". Transactions of the Philological Society. 12 (1): 362–374. doi:10.1111/j.1467-968X.1867.tb00834.x.
- Griffiths, Jane (2000). "The Grammarian as "Poeta" and "Vates"". In Houdt, Toon (ed.). Self-presentation and social identification: the rhetoric and pragmatics of letter writing in early modern times. Supplementa humanistica Lovaniensia. Vol. 18. Leuven University Press. ISBN 978-90-5867-212-4.
- Griffiths, Jane (2006). ""Shredis of sentence": Imitation and Interpretation in Speke Parrot". John Skelton and poetic authority: defining the liberty to speak. Clarendon Press. pp. 79–100. doi:10.1093/acprof:oso/9780199273607.003.0005. ISBN 978-0-19-927360-7.
- Leach, Arthur Francis (1915a). "Chorister's Schools". In Monroe, Paul (ed.). A Cyclopedia of Education. Vol. 1. New York: MacMillan. ISBN 978-1-4400-6149-3.
- Leach, Arthur Francis (1915b). "Eton College". In Monroe, Paul (ed.). Acyclopedia of education. A Cyclopedia of Education. Vol. 2. New York: MacMillan. ISBN 978-1-4400-6150-9.
- Leed, Drea (2010). "Elizabethan Make-up 101". Elizabethan Costume Page.
- Magoun, Francis Peabody (1938). History of football from the beginnings to 1871. H. Pöppinghaus.
- Mantello, Frank Anthony Carl; Rigg, A. G. (1996). Medieval Latin: an introduction and bibliographical guide. CUA Press. ISBN 978-0-8132-0842-8.
- Martin, Gary (1996). "Necessity is the mother of invention". The Phrase Finder.
- Maxwell-Lyte, Sir Henry Churchill (1875). A history of Eton college. 1440–1875. Macmillan and co.
- Murray, James A.H. (1900). The Evolution of English Lexicography. University of Oxford Clarendon Press. p. 21.
- Nugent, Elizabeth M., ed. (1956). "William Horman (c. 1440–1535)". The Thought and Culture of the English Renaissance: an Anthology of. Tudor Prose 1481–1555. Cambridge University Press.
- Orme, Nicholas (August 1995). "The Culture of Children in Medieval England". Past & Present (148). Oxford University Press: 48–88. doi:10.1093/past/148.1.48. ISSN 0031-2746.
- Rickards, Maurice; Twyman, Michael (2000). "Blotting Paper". The encyclopedia of ephemera: a guide to the fragmentary documents of everyday life for the collector, curator, and historian. Routledge. ISBN 978-0-415-92648-5.
- Shapiro, Fred R. (2006). The Yale book of quotes. Yale University Press. ISBN 978-0-300-10798-2.
- Simon, Joan (1979). Education and Society in Tudor England. Cambridge University Press. ISBN 978-0-521-29679-3.
- Singer, Samuel Weller (9 March 1850). "WHAT IS THE MEANING OF "LAERIG?"". Notes & Queries (19): 292.
- Wheatley, Henry Benjamin, ed. (1883). "Pynson's contract with Horman". The Bibliographer; a journal of book-lore. Vol. 4. Elliot Stock.
- Whiting, Bartlett Jere; Whiting, Helen Wescott (1968). Proverbs, sentences, and proverbial phrases: from English writings mainly before 1500. Cambridge, MA: Belknap Press of Harvard University Press.
- à Wood, Anthony; Bliss, Philip (1813). "William Horman". Athenae Oxonienses: An exact history of all the writers and bishops who have had their education in the University of Oxford. To which are added the Fasti, or Annals of the said University. Vol. 1 (3rd ed.). London: Rivington.

Academic offices
Preceded by Thomas Mache	Head Master of Eton College; 1485–1494	Succeeded by Edward Powell
