= Henry Scogan =

English poet and royal tutor

Henry Scogan (also Scoggin) (c.1361–1407) was an English poet and royal tutor.

== Life ==
Scogan belonged to a landowning Norfolk family; inn 1391 he succeeded his brother John as lord of Haviles. Becoming a courtier, he made the acquaintance of Geoffrey Chaucer, and became a poetic follower. Chaucer wrote a short poem Lenvoy a Scogan (1393).

In 1399 Scogan was granted letters of protection to attend Richard II of England on his expedition to Ireland. Subsequently, he became tutor to the four sons of Henry IV.

Scogan owned five Norfolk manors. When he died in 1407, he was succeeded by his son Robert.

== Works ==
In William Caxton's and later editions of Chaucer's Works there appears "moral ballad" composed by Scogan, for the sons of Henry IV. According to John Shirley (c.1366–1456), Scogan interpolated in it three stanzas by Chaucer.

Among manuscripts at Corpus Christi College, Oxford, there was a collection of metrical proverbs, headed Proverbium Scogani. It has been ascribed to Chaucer by John Urry, but also to Scogan.

== In literature ==
Henry Scogan has been confused by some authors with John Scogan, jester to Edward IV, and possibly apocryphal. Shakespeare's mention of "Skogan" in 2 Henry IV, and Ben Jonson's character Scogan of The Fortunate Isles and Their Union, both partake of a composite myth; Inigo Jones made a sketch of Scogan for the use of the masque's actor. The pairing of poet-characters "Scogan" and "Skelton" was worked up in 1600 by Richard Hathway and William Rankins.
