= The Puritan =

Anonymous 17th-century English play

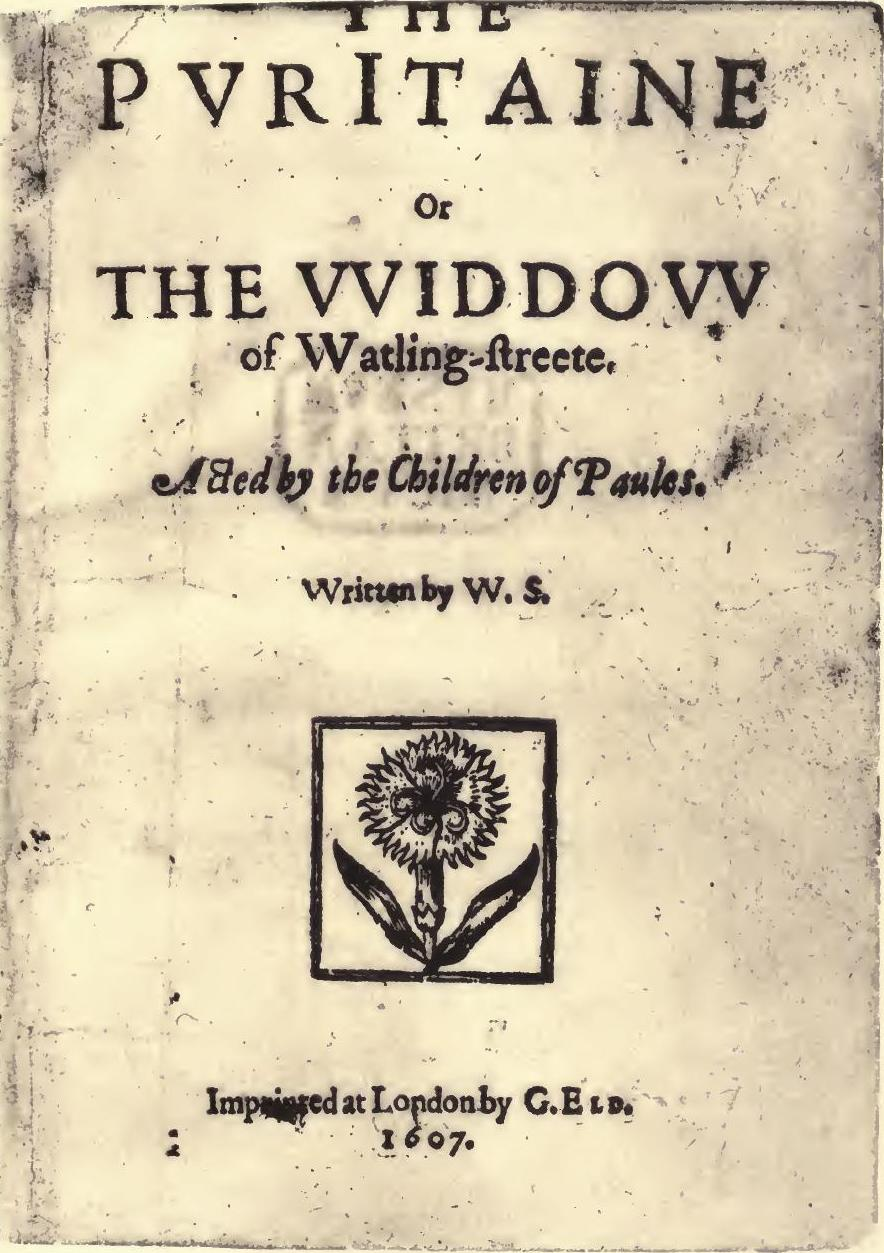
Title page of the 1607 quarto

The Puritan, or the Widow of Watling Street, also known as The Puritan Widow, is an anonymous Jacobean stage comedy, first published in 1607. It is often attributed to Thomas Middleton, but also belongs to the Shakespeare Apocrypha due to its title page attribution to "W.S.".

== Date and authorship ==
The Puritan probably dates from the year 1606. Some of its incidents are drawn from a contemporary work called The Merry Conceited Jests of George Peele, which attributes to the writer George Peele a number of tricks and jokes that can be found in previous popular literature. It contains an allusion to an almanac that specifies 15 July as a Tuesday, which was true only of 1606 in the first decade of the 17th century (although the author may not have intended it to be accurate). Also the play's interest in corporal oaths may be related to the demands for oaths of allegiance from Catholics following the Gunpowder Plot.

The Puritan was entered into the Stationers' Register on 6 August 1607, under the title The Puritan Widow. It was published in quarto format before the end of the year by the printer George Eld, now under the title The Puritan, or The Widow of Watling Street. The title page of the quarto states that the play was performed by the Children of Paul's, one of the boys' acting companies of the era, and attributes its authorship to "W. S." These initials were first identified with William Shakespeare by Edward Archer in his 1656 play list, published in his edition of The Old Law. The Puritan was later added to the second impression of the Shakespeare Third Folio (1664) by publisher Philip Chetwinde, bringing the play into the Shakespeare Apocrypha.

The modern scholarly consensus rejects the identification of "W. S." with Shakespeare. The obscure Jacobean dramatists Wentworth Smith and William Smith have been proposed as alternative candidates, but solely on the strength of the common initials. However, most studies of the play consider the true author to have been Thomas Middleton, and this is supported by stylistic analysis. It is included in Oxford University Press's 2007 Collected Works of Middleton.

== Characters ==
- Lady Plus, a citizen's widow
- Frank and Moll, her two daughters
- Sir Godfrey (Plus), brother-in-law to the Widow Plus
- Master Edmond, son to the Widow Plus
- George Pyeboard, a scholar and a citizen
- Peter Skirmish, an old soldier
- Captain Idle, a highwayman
- Corporal Oath, a vainglorious fellow
- Nicholas St. Tantlings and Simon St. Mary-Overies, serving-men to the Lady Plus
- Frailty
- Sir Oliver Muckhill, a rich city knight and suitor to the Lady Plus
- Sir John Pennydub, a country knight and suitor to Moll
- Sir Andrew Tipstaff, a courtier and suitor to Frank
- The Sheriff of London
- Puttock and Ravenshaw, two of the sheriff's sergeants
- Dogson, a yeoman
- A Nobleman
- A Gentleman Citizen
- A Keeper in the Marshalsea Prison
- Servants to the Gentleman and Sir Oliver Muckhill
- Officers, Musicians, and Attendants

== Synopsis ==
=== Act I ===
Scene 1: A garden behind Lady Plus' house

The opening scene introduces the family of Lady Plus, her son Edmond, and her daughters Francis ("Frank") and Moll. The family is of Puritan orientation. They have just returned from the funeral of Lady Plus's husband, and are accompanied by Sir Godfrey Plus, the dead man's brother. Lady Plus is vocal and demonstrative in her mourning, but two of her children, Edmond and Moll, are notably cool and cynical about their father's death. Sir Godfrey, with a cool and pragmatic spirit of his own, urges Lady Plus to consider remarrying, but she is appalled at the idea so soon after her husband's funeral. Lady Plus asks Edmond why is not weeping at his father's funeral. Edmond excuses himself by saying he is afraid of being mocked by his old schoolmates. In a bid to avoid the pain suffered by her grieving mother, Francis kneels and forswears marriage. Moll kneels too, but in an aside she says that she would never dream of forgoing marriage for her father's sake. In fact, she is very eager to get married as soon as possible. Everyone exits except Edmond. Left alone on stage, Edmond bids his father an unsentimental farewell. He makes plans to run his affairs following his father's example – in other words, he will cheat others ruthlessly and seek to please himself above all.

Scene 2: A street

The second scene introduces another set of characters, the play's rogues and con-men. George Pieboard is a poor and cynical scholar, reduced to living by his wits to survive. He is accompanied by a destitute, discharged soldier named Peter Skirmish. (Pieboard is the character based on George Peele, "peel" and "pieboard" being synonymous terms for the tool bakers use to move their wares into and out of their ovens.) Pieboard and Skirmish discuss the sorry state they have been reduced to. As an antidote to their poverty, Pieboard suggests that they work together to con Lady Plus, with Pieboard posing as a fortune teller and Skirmish posing as a conjurer (wizard). At the end of the scene, the pair witness another friend, Captain Idle, being taken to prison. They follow to learn the charges and to see what they can do.

Scene 3: A street

The two sets of characters, Puritans and scoundrels, begin to make contact in the third scene. Corporal Oath, another cashiered soldier, encounters three of Lady Plus's servants, Frailty, Simon St. Mary Overies, and Nicholas St. Antlings. Amid some comic back-and-forth about Puritan hypocrisy and the Corporal's bad breath, it is revealed that Nicholas St. Antlings is a kinsman of Captain Idle. At the scene's end, Nicholas and the Corporal also head off to the Marshalsea Prison to learn Captain Idle's fate. (St. Antlings and St. Mary Overies are two London parishes that were centres of Puritan activity in the early 17th century. The Puritan preacher William Crashaw took offence at the play's satire against Puritans, and preached a sermon on the subject in 1608.)

Scene 4: Idle's cell in the Marshalsea Prison

Pieboard and Skirmish visit Captain Idle in prison. Idle tells them that he has been imprisoned for robbery. He fears that he will be hanged. Pieboard promises to do everything in his power to see that Idle is set free. Nicholas and Corporal Oath enter. Idle – a man who holds Puritans in very low esteem – is not happy to see his kinsman, Nicholas. Corporal Oath insists that Nicholas could prove useful. Pieboard suggests a scheme whereby Nicholas could help to get Idle out of jail. According to Pieboard's plan, Nicholas should steal his master's expensive chain (an ornament worn around the neck) and hide it in the garden. When his master (Sir Godfrey) becomes upset at the loss of the item, Nicholas should tell him that he has an imprisoned kinsman (Idle) who has a supernatural ability to find things. If events transpire according to Pieboard's designs, the master will then spring Idle from prison, Idle will "find" the chain in the garden, and everybody will be happy. Nicholas agrees to follow Pieboard's scheme. He exits. As part of another piece of his scheme, Pieboard instructs Skirmish and the Corporal to fake a fight in front of Lady Plus's home that evening. Pieboard also notes that he has to be careful when walking about in public because he faces the threat of being arrested as a result of unpaid debts.

=== Act II ===
Scene 1: A room in Lady Plus' house

Speaking to herself, Moll looks forward to marrying her suitor, Sir John Pennydub, the son of a wealthy farmer. A servant enters and tells Moll that Pennydub has come to visit her. Moll is happy that Pennydub has managed to get into the house without alerting her mother's attention. Pennydub enters and asks Moll for a kiss. Moll kisses him. Lady Plus enters with Sir Godfrey. Moll and Pennydub exit to avoid being seen together. Sir Godfrey continues to encourage Lady Plus to remarry. Lady Plus will hear none of it. Sir Oliver Muckhill (suitor to Lady Plus), Sir Andrew Tipstaff (suitor to Francis) and Sir John Pennydub (suitor to Moll) enter. Lady Plus scorns them, assures them that she and her daughters will never marry, and tells them to leave. As the gentlemen make their exit, Sir Godfrey whispers that he will do everything in his power to convince Lady Plus to change her mind. Pieboard enters, posing as a fortune-teller. Sir Godfrey exits. Lady Plus's daughters, Francis and Moll, enter. Pieboard tells Lady Plus that her husband's soul is in Purgatory (Puritans rejected Purgatory as non-Biblical, and an invention of the Pope used to increase his power and extort money from believers.) Lady Plus is sceptical of Pieboard's claims. To prove his supernatural abilities, Pieboard makes a series of predictions: 1) Lady Plus's brother-in-law, Sir Godfrey, will lose something valuable (remember that Pieboard arranged for Nicholas to steal Godfrey's chain in 1.4); 2) There will be some bloodshed resulting in a death in front of Lady Plus's door (remember that Pieboard instructed Skirmish and Corporal Oath to stage a fight in front of Lady Plus's home); 3) Lady Plus and Francis will go mad and run naked in public; and 4) Moll will be struck dumb. The women are horrified by these predictions. Pieboard tells them that, if the first two predictions (the ones he has rigged) come true, there are measures the women can take to avoid going mad or being struck dumb: the two women who have forsworn marriage (Lady Plus and Francis) should get married as soon as possible, and the daughter who is in a hurry to get married (Moll) should remain single. The women exit, deeply troubled. Pieboard congratulates himself on his wit. He says that, to validate his "prophecy" about a death at Lady Plus's door, he will give Corporal Oath a sleeping potion that will make it seem as though he is dead.

Scene 2: A garden

Nicholas says that he has managed to steal Sir Godfrey's chain.

=== Act III ===
Scene 1: The street before Lady Plus's house

Corporal Oath and Skirmish stage a sword fight in front of Lady Plus's house. Oath pretends that he has been wounded in the leg. Lady Plus's servants witness the entire ordeal. A pair of officers arrest Skirmish and carry Oath off to get medical attention.

Scene 2: An room in Lady Plus's house

Lady Plus is convinced that Pieboard is a true fortune-teller now that his first "prophecy" (bloodshed at the door) has come true. Sir Godfrey enters, angry because he cannot find his chain. Following Pieboard's scheme (from 1.4), Nicholas tells Godfrey that he has an imprisoned kinsman (Idle) who has a supernatural ability to find lost items. Godfrey says he will arrange Idle's release.

Scene 3: A street

The sergeants Puttock and Ravenshaw arrest Pieboard for outstanding debts owed to his landlady. Pieboard tells the sergeants that he was on his way to collect five pounds from a Gentleman for a masque he has just written. He promises that, if they allow him to go to the Gentleman's house to collect the money, he will pay off all of his outstanding debts and give them whatever money remains of the five pounds. The sergeants agree to accompany Pieboard to the Gentleman's house.

Scene 4: A gallery in a Gentleman's house

Pieboard takes Puttock and Ravenshaw to the home of a wealthy Gentleman he does not know. When the Gentleman comes to the door, Pieboard pulls him aside, quietly explains his predicament, and begs to be admitted into the house so he can escape out the back door. Pleased by Pieboard's wit, the Gentleman loudly invites him inside to be paid. Pieboard and the Gentleman exit. Puttock and Ravenshaw wait in the gallery and make plans for how they will spend the money they think they are about to receive. After a while, the Gentleman re-enters and tells the sergeants that Pieboard left out of the back door long ago. The sergeants curse their luck and vow to see Pieboard rot in prison if they can ever lay hands on him again.

Scene 5: Idle's cell in the Marshalsea Prison

Pieboard visits Idle in prison and tells him that he will have to perform a phoney "conjuring ceremony" to find Sir Godfrey's chain. Sir Godfrey enters with Edmond and Nicholas. Pieboard poses as a fortune-teller and Idle poses as a conjurer. Sir Godfrey tells Idle that his release has been secured and promises a large reward if Idle is able to find the chain. Idle says that he will perform a conjuring ceremony to find the chain on the following day.

=== Act IV ===
Scene 1: A room in Lady Plus's house

Afraid of being struck dumb now that Pieboard's "prophesies" have come true, Moll tells Pennydub that she cannot marry him. Pennydub tells Moll that his father has just died and left him a considerable inheritance. Eager to get her hands on the money, Moll decides to ignore the prophecy and become Pennydub's wife.

Scene 2: Another room in Lady Plus's house

Sir Oliver Muckhill and Sir Andrew Tipstaff visit Lady Plus and Francis. Lady Plus is angry with the suitors for daring to present themselves again so soon after she told them to go away, but her attitude toward them seems to have softened now that Pieboard's first two "prophesies" have come true. She orders Francis to kiss Tipstaff and tells Muckhill that she has changed her mind and now intends to marry. Muckhill is overjoyed to hear this news. Tipstaff tempts Francis with promises of the extravagances she can expect to receive if she will become his wife. A servant enters and tells Lady Plus that Sir Godfrey and the "conjurer" will arrive shortly. The suitors exit. Lady Plus moves to an adjoining room. Sir Godfrey enters with Nicholas, Idle, Pieboard and Edmond. Idle says that the room is perfect for a conjuring ceremony. Frightened by the prospect of encountering a demon, Godfrey, Nicholas and Edmond retire to an adjoining room and plan to observe the ceremony through a keyhole. Idle recites some magical-sounding mumbo-jumbo. A touch of convenient thunder rumbles in the sky. Godfrey is frightened and impressed. Faking the voice of a demon, Pieboard asks the "conjurer" what he wants. When the ceremony is over, Idle calls Godfrey back into the room and tells him that the demon has dropped his chain in the garden. Godfrey, Lady Plus and Nicholas all run to the garden to collect the chain. Edmond enters. Fully convinced that a demon has just visited the house, he imagines that he can smell brimstone and inspects the hangings for signs of fire damage. Idle casts a "spell" to make Edmond invisible. To test his "invisibility", Edmond walks up to Pieboard and tweaks his nose. Pieboard pretends that he cannot see Edmond at all. Sir Godfrey enters. He is extremely happy to have his chain back. Convinced that he is invisible, Edmond strikes Godfrey across the face. Godfrey promises to whip Edmond as punishment for his impudence. Edmond is surprised that his "invisibility" has worn off. Godfrey hugs Idle and thanks him for helping to recover the chain. Lady Plus says that, if she must marry, she will marry Idle, whom she describes as a worthy captain and man of wit. (At this point, the action transfers to the street in front of Lady Plus's house, but there is not a formal scene break). Officers enter carrying Corporal Oath's coffin (he is assumed to be dead as a result of the "wound" Skirmish supposedly gave him in 3.1; in fact, he is merely sleeping deeply under the effect of Pieboard's sleeping potion). Other officers lead Skirmish in handcuffs; he is on his way to be executed as punishment for "murdering" Oath. Pieboard claims that he has the power to raise Oath from the dead. The officers tell him to go ahead and try. Oath wakes up. Everyone is very impressed. The officers agree to set Skirmish free – he is no longer guilty of murder because Oath has come back to life. Godfrey calls for a banquet to celebrate the day's miracles. Francis announces her intention to marry Pieboard.

=== Act V ===
Scene 1: The street before Lady Plus's house

The big wedding day has arrived. Lady Plus will marry Captain Idle, and Francis will marry Pieboard. Edmond says that he is looking forward to having Idle as a father-in-law and Pieboard as a brother-in-law. Pieboard and Idle enter. Pieboard asks Edmond to get the musicians drunk.

Scene 2: The street before Lady Plus's house

Sir John Pennydub goes to Moll's window. He asks her to admit him to her room, but she refuses.

Scene 3:. A room in Sir Oliver Muckhill's house

Skirmish talks with Sir Oliver Muckhill and Sir Andrew Tipstaff. Skirmish has told Sir Oliver the details of Pieboard's schemes – he apparently feels that Pieboard has abused him and wants revenge. Sir Oliver says that he has a prestigious friend (the "Nobleman") who will convince Lady Plus that Pieboard and Idle are rogues.

Scene 4: A street, a church appearing

The Nobleman (Sir Oliver Muckhill's friend) confronts Lady Plus before the weddings are set to commence. With Skirmish's help, he reveals the details of Pieboard's schemes. Sir Godfrey fires Nicholas for stealing his chain. Lady Plus announces that she will marry Muckhill, Francis will marry Tipstaff, and Moll will marry Pennydub. Pieboard and Idle make their escape, none the worse for wear. The play ends on a note of festivity.
