= Robert Whittington =

English grammarian

Robert Whittington (also spelt Wittinton, Whitynton, or Whitinton; c. 1480 – c. 1553) was an English grammarian. He was a pupil at Magdalen College School, Oxford, where he probably studied under the grammarian John Stanbridge.

In 1513 he was admitted as a BA at Oxford, having studied rhetoric for 14 years, and taught it for 12 years. About 1519 he presented Cardinal Wolsey with a verse and a prose treatise, with a dedication requesting patronage. In the same year he published Libellus epigrammaton, an anthology of poems addressed to Wolsey, Henry VIII, Thomas More, and John Skelton. His Vulgaria, published in 1520, pays compliments to the late king Henry VII, to Thomas Linacre, and to More, who was here first described as "a man for all seasons". Whittington's efforts succeeded by 1523, at the latest, when he enjoyed the favour of Henry VIII.

Whittington was most famous as the author of elementary Latin school books, including De nominum generibus (1511), Declinationes nominum (c. 1511), De heteroclitis nominibus (c. 1511), Syntaxis (second edition, 1512), De syllabarum quantitate (second edition, c. 1512), De octo partibus orationis (c. 1514), De synonymis together with De magistratibus veterum Romanorum (1515), Vulgaria (English and Latin sentences for translation, 1520), and Verborum preterita et supina (1521). He also edited John Stanbridge's Accidence (c. 1515). Each dealt with a different aspect of grammar, and could be bought individually and cheaply. They were widely sold and frequently republished up to the early 1530s.

Whittington's grammars continued to be printed during the 1520s, usually by Wynkyn de Worde but briefly also by Richard Pynson. About 1529, however, Whittington seems to have moved his custom to Peter Treveris, who issued his works for the next two years. By 1533 Whittington had returned to Worde. Following Worde's death in 1534 he turned his attention to translation from Latin into English. He brought out versions of Erasmus's De civilitate morum puerilium (1532), three works by Cicero (De officiis, 1534; Paradoxa, c. 1534; and De senectute, c. 1535), and three allegedly by Seneca (The Forme and Rule of Honest Lyvynge, 1546; The Myrrour or Glasse of Maners, 1547; and De remediis fortuitorum, 1547), the Forme and Myrrour actually being the work of Martin of Braga.

== See also ==
- Grammarians' War
