= Grammarians' War =

Conflict between rival systems of teaching Latin

William Lily on John Skelton
(British Library ms Harley 540, f. 57 verso)

Quid me Scheltone fronte sic aperta
Carnis vipero potens veneo
Quid versus trutina meos iniqua
Libras. Dicere vera num livebit
Doctrina tibi dum parari famam
Et doctus fieri studes poeta:
Doctrinam nec habes nec es poeta.

—William Lily

With face so bold, and teeth so sharp
Of Viper's venome, why dost carp?
Why are my verses by thee weigh'd
In a false scale? May truth be said?
Whilst thou, to get the more esteeme,
A learned Poet fain wouldst seem;
Skelton, thou art, let all men know it,
Neither learned, nor a poet.

— English translation by bishop Thomas Fuller in 1662

The Grammarians' War (1519–1521) was a conflict between rival systems of teaching Latin. The two main antagonists were English grammarians and schoolmasters William Horman and Robert Whittington. The War involved Latin primers called Vulgaria, which were thus named because they contained "vulgar" (in the 16th century sense, i.e. everyday and common) sayings or phrases that schoolchildren were expected to use in normal life, such as "Sit away or I shall give thee a blow," and, "Would God we might go play!"

== Description ==
Whittington began the feud. Horman had published his Vulgaria in 1519, and it was adopted by William Lily, the headmaster of St Paul's School, who had written several laudatory poems prefacing it. This replaced an earlier Vulgaria written by John Stanbridge, headmaster of St Mary Magdalen's School in Oxford. Stanbridge was Whittington's former tutor, and Whittington, in support of restoring the use of his former tutor's work in the school, attacked Horman's Vulgaria with satirical verse, which he printed and pinned to the door of St Paul's. He was critical of all aspects of Horman's work, including its size and its price, and also of Lily for his poor judgement. In riposte, Lily and Horman published Antibossicon in 1521. This was an attack on Whittington, mocking the airs and graces that he had assumed as "chief poet of England", and criticizing his abilities as a writer. Its title reflected Lily and Horman's characterization of Whittington as a bear. (The title page verso of the work contains an image of a bear being attacked by dogs.) This was a double-pronged reference, because in addition it parodied Whittington's pseudonym of "Bossus" ("bos" + "sus", the reasons for which are unknown), claiming that it was rather a reference to the "Bosse of Billingsgate" water tap, built in Billingsgate in London by Whittington's namesake, that Whittington had somehow fallen in love with. Whittington's response was entitled Antilycon ("against the wolf").

Other people joined in the fray, on one side or the other, and it became an exchange of pamphlets and Latin verse. One such was John Skelton, who supported Whittington and wrote poetry deriding Lily (one of which began "Urgeor impulsus tibi, retundere dentes", which translates as "One struck [Lily] I am bound to knock your teeth in"). Lily, in response, attacked Skelton, in Latin verse (at above right). The back and forth was very personal, and full of bitter invective, on both sides. However, ostensibly it was about pedagogy, in particular about the proper method for teaching Latin. Horman eschewed the earlier method of Latin primers that employed precepts, exemplified by Whittington's textbooks, in favour of a method that taught primarily by example. Whereas Whittington's, traditional, approach was to teach the rules of grammar first, and then progress to examples; Horman's approach was to start with the examples, and leave the grammatical precepts until later. Horman had prefaced his textbook with a general commentary on the state of Latin instruction in the country at the time — a critique that Whittington, an author of many textbooks, took very personally.

Historians usually characterize this as conflict between the "old" and the "new"; or between the "Greeks", who favoured a humanist approach to learning Latin, already employed at the time for other languages (and a pedagogical approach that St Paul's pioneered), that favoured learning from example over learning by rote, and the "Trojans" (so-named simply because they opposed the "Greeks") who favoured the traditional rote learning of grammar followed by progression to study of the writings of the classical authors. Indeed, Whittington's old, traditionalist, approach was eventually to lose the war, when in the late 1520s Cardinal Wolsey was to proclaim that Leonard Cox's revision of Lilly's grammar was to be the single grammar used in all schools across the country. However several (Orme 1973, pp. 112 and Carlson 1992) argue that in fact there was less concrete difference, as far as the pedagogy was concerned, between Whittington and Horman/Lily than their argument indicates; and that they had more in common with one another as contemporaries than they did with the grammarians who had preceded them. The "new" grammar as exemplified by Horman's Vulgaria, arranged according to directives laid down by Erasmus, was less colloquial than the "old" grammar exemplified by Whittington's Vulgaria. Whittington's Vulgaria was in fact to be the last such textbook ever published.

Another voice in the pedagogical dispute was that of John Colet, who argued vehemently that in teaching Latin it was as important to teach composition as it was to teach translation, and also maintained that teaching grammatical rules with excerpts from Classical writers as mere examples was putting the cart entirely before the horse. This reflected a shift in Latin education that was occurring at the time. Latin was less and less the everyday language of the schoolchild, despite school rules that required it in many places, and the purpose for which it was taught was shifting from a colloquial language of everyday use, the primary language of Renaissance scholarship for which translation from Latin to English was paramount, to a secondary (albeit not yet subordinate) scholastic language, used to study the works of classical scholarship, in which composition skill, to write in Latin based upon English scholastic thinking, was paramount.

Skelton's heavy criticism of the "Greek" way of thinking, where they do not master the basics of grammar before progressing to reading classical writings, and so are unable to compose even basic sentences to start with because they lack the basics that in his view they need, is preserved in his Speke, Parrott:

Let Parrot, I pray you, have lyberte to prate,
For aurea lyngya Greca ought to be magnified,
Yf it were cond perfytely, and after the rate,
As lyngua Latina in scole matter occupyed;
But our Grekis theyr Greke so well have applyed
That hey cannot say in Greke, rydynge by the way,
"How, hosteler, fetche my hors a botell of hay!"
