= The Fortunate Isles and Their Union =

Play

The Fortunate Isles and Their Union is a Jacobean era masque, written by Ben Jonson and designed by Inigo Jones, and performed on 9 January 1625. It was the last masque acted before King James I of England (who died two months later on 27 March), and therefore the final masque of the Jacobean era.

== The show ==
The masque had, as its theme, the vision of a unified British kingdom under the guidance of a wise king. "It reflected perfectly the image that he [James] had tried, in his rough-hewn way, to cultivate – even if history, in allotting him part of the blame for the catastrophe that was to befall his son, would be less generous to his reputation."

The Fortunate Isles opens with the entrance of Johphiel, "an airy spirit" who is supposedly "the intelligence of Jupiter's sphere." Johphiel has a long conversation with Merefool, "a melancholic student," which involves much material on the then-new and controversial subject of "the brethren of the Rosy Cross." Jonson devotes this masque to his skeptical and satirical view of the Rosicrucians, just as he had taken a similarly jaundiced view of alchemy in his masque of the previous decade, Mercury Vindicated from the Alchemists (1615).

A more specifically English cast to the masque comes with the introduction of the two poets John Skelton and Henry Scogan. The English theme is stronger in the anti-masque, which, in addition to generic figures ("four knaves"), introduces the figures of Mary Ambree, Elinor Rumming, Long Meg of Westminster, and Tom Thumb. Later come the stereotypical mythological figures of the masque form – in this case, the minor sea gods Proteus, Portunus, and Saron. Inigo Jones's staging featured a floating and moving island (another element that would have appeared in the cancelled masque of the previous year).

Though The Fortunate Isles was the major entertainment of the 1624–25 Christmas season at the Stuart Court, Jonson did not hesitate to re-cycle some lyrical passages from the previous year's masque, Neptune's Triumph for the Return of Albion, which had been cancelled due to Court scheduling controversies. (Jonson would re-use other material from Neptune's Triumph for his next stage play, The Staple of News.)

== Sources ==
For source material for his text, Jonson relied upon the Speculum Sophicum Rhodostauroticum of Teophilus Schweigardt (1618) and the Artis Kabbalisticae of Pierre Morestel (1621). The name Johphiel derives from Cornelius Agrippa's De Occulta Philosophia (later translated to English under the title Three Books of Occult Philosophy).

== Publication ==
The text of The Fortunate Isles was published in quarto soon after its performance in 1625. The quarto is dated "1624," since prior to 1751 the English started the New Year on 25 March. [See: Old Style and New Style dates.] The masque was reprinted in the second folio collection of Jonson's works in 1641, and in subsequent editions of the collected works.
