= Five Tudor Portraits =

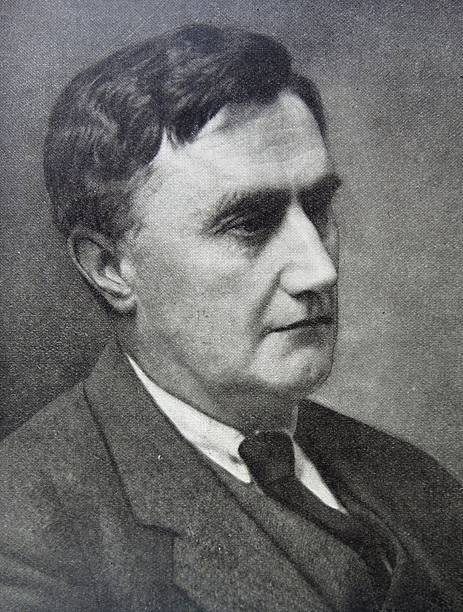
Portrait of Ralph Vaughan Williams by Herbert Lambert in the 1920s

Five Tudor Portraits (1935), by Ralph Vaughan Williams, is a work scored for contralto (or mezzo-soprano), baritone, mixed chorus and orchestra. It sets several poems, or extracts from poems, by the 15th- and 16th-century poet John Skelton, portraying five characters with a mixture of satire, compassion, acerbity and earthy humour. Though acclaimed by critics, it has not been so frequently performed as some of Vaughan Williams' other works. In its complete form it lasts about 42 minutes, though the composer also sanctioned the performance of individual movements separately.

== History ==
=== Composition ===
Five Tudor Portraits owes its origin to a conversation with Sir Edward Elgar, who suggested that Vaughan Williams set Elinor Rumming; Skelton's metre, he said, was often pure jazz. Vaughan Williams selected and began to set texts from Philip Henderson's edition of Skelton's poems for six portraits, eventually rejecting one, Margery Wentworth. The poems were treated with much freedom, the composer cutting them down radically (less than one third of Elinor Rumming and Philip Sparrow were used) and sometimes even rearranging the order of the lines. By 20 June 1935 he had "rough-finished" the work.

=== First performances ===
The first performance was given in St Andrew's Hall, Norwich on 25 September 1936 as part of the 34th Norwich Festival. The performers were Astra Desmond (contralto), Roy Henderson (baritone), the Festival Chorus and the London Philharmonic Orchestra conducted by the composer. At the same concert Benjamin Britten's Our Hunting Fathers was premiered. Many members of the audience were rather disconcerted by the earthy humour of some of the Portraits, one in particular, the Countess of Albemarle, walking out of the hall in the middle of the performance with the loud comment, "Disgusting!". Vaughan Williams was pleased at this proof of the chorus's good diction. The work was widely praised by critics, H. C. Colles writing that "Everyone concerned had caught the spirit of the thing", while Edwin Evans noted the audience were unusually "relieved of concert-room inhibitions". The fourth Portrait was a favourite with all.

The first London performance took place at the Queen's Hall on 27 January 1937, with the same soloists, the Croydon Philharmonic Society, the BBC Chorus, and the BBC Symphony Orchestra conducted by Sir Adrian Boult. It was later performed at the Proms in 1945 and 1952.

=== Publication ===
Oxford University Press published the vocal score in 1935, and the full score in 1971.

== Structure ==
The five movements are:

- Ballad: The Tunning of Elinor Rumming. Allegro pesante. Contralto solo, mixed chorus and orchestra. Poem: The Tunning of Elinour Rumming.
- Intermezzo: Pretty Bess. Allegretto grazioso. Baritone solo, mixed chorus and orchestra. Poem: Speak, Parrot.
- Burlesca: Epitaph on John Jayberd of Diss. Allegro. Male chorus and orchestra. Poem: A Devout Trental for Old John Clarke, Sometime the Holy Patriarch of Diss.
- Romanza: Jane Scroop (Her Lament for Philip Sparrow). Lento doloroso. Mezzo-soprano (or contralto) solo, female chorus and orchestra. Poem: Philip Sparrow.
- Scherzo: Jolly Rutterkin. Allegro moderato. Baritone, mixed chorus and orchestra. Poems: Jolly Rutterkin and Magnificence.

== Analysis ==
Though Vaughan Williams described the work as a "choral suite", it shows more sign of symphonic argument than that phrase implies, leading the composer and critic Wilfrid Mellers to call it "a cross between a symphony and an English oratorio, albeit one of a pronounced secular character." It is typical of Vaughan Williams' music in its frequent use of flattened sevenths, but atypical in showing hardly any trace of folksong.

The long first movement, The Tunning of Elinor Rumming, presents us with not only the title-character, a blowsy alehouse-keeper past her youth, but also with a mob of her customers, one of whom, Drunken Alice, eventually takes centre stage, and finally with a second mob of drinkers. The music, setting rhyming couplets only four or five syllables long and abounding in puns and scatological jokes, rattles along helter-skelter in 3/4 or 9/8 time. It progresses from an allegro to a scherzo, a slow movement, a fugato, and a final coda.

The much shorter second movement, Pretty Bess, is a love-song in which the baritone, sometimes echoed by male chorus, addresses Bess in terms reminiscent of the courtly love tradition. It is mostly modal until it resolves into G major.

The third movement, Epitaph on John Jayberd of Diss, is a splenetic scherzo celebrating in a mixture of Latin and English the death of a disreputable cleric, a historical character from Skelton's hometown who died in 1506 and whom he clearly did not miss. The basic tonality, though ambiguous, is at least arguably a modal F minor. It is full of ostinatos and percussive rhythms reminiscent of Orff's Carmina Burana.

The long fourth movement is a Requiem voiced by a convent novice, Jane Scroop, also a historical character, for her pet sparrow, Philip. Vaughan Williams saw the poem as being a perfectly sincere lament rather than a parody, and set it as such. A cello solo marked lento doloroso is taken up by the orchestra, then the chorus sings a Placebo. Answering a question from Jane, they explain that they are singing a Mass for Philip Sparrow. Jane describes his killing by a cat, and she and the chorus vow vengeance on all cats. She describes her sparrow's little ways, then summons all the varieties of bird one by one to its funeral, ending with a Miserere. The choir prays for the rest of Philip's soul and Jane makes her last farewells.

The short last movement, Jolly Rutterkin, portrays a character described by Michael Kennedy as "a Tudor spiv". Jazzy and marked by virtuosic use of cross-rhythms, it is divided into three sections, the first pentatonic, the second in E flat major, and the last a fugato passage combining the previous two themes.

== Instrumentation ==
The vocal forces used in this work are contralto or mezzo-soprano, baritone, and mixed chorus. The instrumentation is: 3 flutes (3rd doubling piccolo), 2 oboes, 1 cor anglais, 2 clarinets, 2 bassoons, 1 double bassoon, 4 French horns, 2 trumpets, 3 trombones, 1 tuba, timpani (chromatic ad lib.), percussion (2 players), harp and strings. Vaughan Williams sanctioned a degree of flexibility, the following instruments being dispensable at need: flute 2, oboe 2, double bassoon, French horns 3 and 4, tuba, percussion 2. He instructed that if a harp were unobtainable a piano should substitute for it.

== Reception ==
The Five Tudor Portraits have on the whole been a great critical success from the beginning. It is true that there have been some dissenting voices: John Caldwell, in 1999, found that "the impression of a fading period-piece is hard to resist", and after the first London performance Constant Lambert wrote, "Vaughan Williams' temperament seems to me too elegiac, nostalgic, and individual to interpret the extrovert bawdy directness of that admirable poet Skelton". A more recent critic, however, has given it as his opinion that "the composer [is] at his most dazzlingly inventive, the resourceful and witty writing fitting Skelton's words like a glove." For him, the fourth movement has "an irresistible humanity" and "contains music as compassionate as Vaughan Williams ever achieved". Frank Howes thought "the characterization...vivid and the music full-flavoured". Similarly, James Day, in his 1961 study of Vaughan Williams' music, wrote that "The whole suite is aflame with passion and feeling...This is a portrait gallery as vital and as colourful as Miss Power's Medieval People; here are gargoyles carved out with glee and impatience rather than carefully worked miniatures (except of course for 'Jane')". For Eric Saylor it "capture[s] Vaughan Williams at the height of his compositional powers", for Michael Kennedy it is "his happiest, raciest, most poetical choral work" which can be counted "among his finest achievements", and Nick Strimple thought it one of the best choral-orchestral works of the 20th century.

Notwithstanding the critical acclaim for Five Tudor Portraits, it has historically not been performed so often as the same composer's Sea Symphony. Various reasons for this have been suggested: that it is too unconventional for a strait-laced choral festival, that it makes such large demands on both chorus and conductor, that the humour of Skelton's poems is of too archaic a kind to be widely appreciated, or that the structure is at fault, with the two long movements overbalancing the three short ones, making the whole work too episodic.

== Discography ==
- Nell Rankin, Robert B. Anderson, The Mendelssohn Choir Of Pittsburgh, Russell Wichman, The Pittsburgh Symphony Orchestra, cond. William Steinberg (1953). Five Tudor Portraits (LP). Capitol. CTL7047.
- Elizabeth Bainbridge, John Carol Case, The Bach Choir, The New Philharmonia Orchestra, cond. David Willcocks (1969). Five Tudor Portraits (LP). His Master's Voice. ASD 2489.
- Eleanor Houston, Brian Hansford, Tudor Choristers, Melbourne Chamber Orchestra, cond. David Carolane (1974). Tudor Choristers in Concert (LP). AMS. AM 12/27 S.
- Sarah Walker, Henry Herford, Guildford Choral Society, Philharmonia Orchestra, cond. Hilary Davan Wetton (1988). Five Mystical Songs, Five Tudor Portraits (CD). Hyperion. CDA66306.
- Jean Rigby, John Shirley-Quirk, London Symphony Chorus, London Symphony Orchestra, cond. Richard Hickox (1998). Five Tudor Portraits, Five Variants Of Dives And Lazarus (CD). Chandos. CHAN 9593.
