= Old English Dicts of Cato =

The Old English Dicts of Cato is the editorial name given to the Old English text based on the Latin Distichs of Cato. It is a collection of approximately 80 prose proverbs, the exact number varying between each of the three manuscript versions. These can be found in MS Cambridge, Trinity College, R.9.17, MS British Library, Cotton Vespasian D.xiv and MS British Library, Cotton Julius A.ii respectively.

== Themes, structure and purpose ==
Being an adaptation of the Latin Distichs of Cato, the Old English Dicts of Cato shares many of its themes. However, Elaine Treharne argues that the Latin version was adapted into Old English for a monastic readership, perhaps lay people who had turned to monasticism later in life (in the early sense of conversi), and that in doing so, the Latin proverbs about "classical practices or legends" and those about secular concerns were removed. The impersonal grammatical structuring of the Latin version was also dropped in favour of the use of the second person pronoun þu. These two changes reflect contemporary ideological movements in which a monk's individual relationship with God was increasingly emphasised.

Each proverb in the Latin text is a distich of poetry, but these are translated into prose in the Old English version. Some of the distichs are imbued with additional material, while some are omitted. The Old English version also alters the ordering of the proverbs so that some that are thematically similar are placed in apposition to each other.

== Relationship of manuscripts ==
R.S. Cox considers the three extant manuscripts to be derived from the same Old English manuscript. That is, they are different copies of the same original Old English translation rather than three individual attempts at translation.

MS British Library, Cotton Julius A.ii lacks the proverbs numbers 13, 55, 66 and 81 as found in MS Cambridge, Trinity College R.9.17. This Trinity manuscript contains a parable attributed to St Augustine at the end of the text which is not found in either of the other two copies. Apart from this, MS British Library, Cotton Vespasian D.xiv contains all the 81 proverbs included in the Trinity manuscript as well as six additional proverbs from various other sources. These include the first proverb of the manuscript, Mann sceal þurh his modes snoternysse hine sylfne geglengen to wisre lare ('A man should, for the wisdom of his mind, adorn himself with wise learning'). Treharne reads this addition as evidence to indicate that the text was employed by individuals involved in "self-motivated" and "private" reading.
