= John Scogan =

Court jester

- Occupation: Court jester

John Scogan (fl. 1480), Scoggin, Scogin, or Skogyn, was a possibly fictitious jester in the court of Edward IV.

== Biography ==
No strictly contemporary reference to John Scogan has been discoverable. All that is known of him is derived from a volume purporting to collect his "Jests," which was compiled in the sixteenth century by, it is said, Dr. Andrew Boorde, a witty physician, who died in 1549. The anonymous editor of the volume states, in a prefatory note, that he had "heard say that Scoggin did come of an honest stock, no kindred, and that his friends did set him to schoole at Oxford, where he did continue till he was made master of art." Warton, on no known authority, assigned him to Oriel College. The "Jests" themselves include many that are familiar in "The merie tales of Skeltoun" and similar collections of earlier date. The pretension that they were edited by Andrew Boorde was doubtless the fraudulent device of an enterprising bookseller, and it is not unreasonable to suspect that the whole was a work of fiction, and that Scogan is a fictitious hero. The tales supply a rough biography of Scogan, which is clearly to a large extent apocryphal. According to them, he was educated at Oxford and graduated in arts. He prepared for the priesthood the son of a husbandman of the neighbourhood, and when the plague raged in Oxford—apparently in 1471—withdrew with other tutors to the hospital of St. Bartholomew in the suburbs. Subsequently, he dwelt in London, whence he removed for a time to Bury. At length he obtained the post of fool in the household of one Sir William Neville, whom it is difficult to identify. Neville brought him to court, and his wit delighted the king and queen. The former gave him a house in Cheapside. He went on progress with the court, and received rich gifts from the courtiers. Subsequently, by his freedom of speech, he offended the king and retired to Paris. He was well received by the French king, but was ultimately banished from France. Returning to England, he found himself still out of favour at the English court, and paid a visit to a friend named Everid, who resided at Jesus College, Cambridge. After travelling with Everid to Newcastle, he obtained pardon of the king and queen. Soon afterwards he died of a "perillous cough," and was buried on the east side of Westminster Abbey. The site of his grave was subsequently occupied by Henry VII's chapel. He married young, and had at least one son. Raphael Holinshed enumerates among the great men of Edward IV's time "Skogan, a learned gentleman, and student for a time at Oxforde, of a pleasaunte witte, and bente to mery devises, in respect whereof he was called into the courte, where, giving himself to his naturall inclination of mirthe and pleasant pastime, he plaied many sporting parts, althoughe not in suche uncivill maner as hath bene of hym reported." Holinshed evidently derived his information from the book of "Jests" traditionally associated with Scogan's name.

No early edition of Scogan's "Jests" is extant. In 1565–6 Thomas Colwell obtained a license for printing "the geystes of Skoggon gathered together in this volume." The wording of the entry suggests that some of the "geystes" had already been published separately. The only argument adduced in favour of Boorde's responsibility for the publication lies in the fact that Colwell, the first publisher, had succeeded to the business of Robert Wyer, who was Boorde's regular publisher. The work was repeatedly reissued; an edition dated 1613 was in the Harleian collection. The earliest now known is dated 1626, and the title runs, "The First and Best Part of Scoggins Jests. Full of Witty Mirth and Pleasant Shifts, done by him in France and other places: being a Preservative against Melancholy. Gathered by Andrew Boord, Doctor of physicke, London. Printed by Francis Williams, 1626," 12mo (black letter). An abridgment (chap-book) was issued about 1680, and again by James Caulfield in 1796. The full text is in William Carew Hazlitt's "Old English Jest-books" (1864, ii. 37–161).

Numerous references to "Scoggin's Jests" in sixteenth and seventeenth century literature attest their popularity. In 1575 the tract was in the library of Captain Cox. "Scoggin's Jests" was coupled with "The Hundred Merry Tales" as popular manuals of witticisms in the epilogue of "Wily Beguil'd," 1606 (written earlier). In 1607 there appeared a like collection of jests, under the title of "Dobson's Drie Bobbes, son and heire to Scoggin." "Scoggin's jests" is numbered among popular tracts of the day by John Taylor, the water-poet, in his "Motto" (1622), and in "Harry White his Humour" (1640?), as well as in the comedy called "London Chaunticleers" (1659). Fulke Greville, 1st Baron Brooke, versified a coarse anecdote of "Scoggin" in "Caelica," No. xlix. In 1680, at the trial of Elizabeth Cellier, one of the judges, Baron Weston, indicated his sense of the absurdity of the evidence of a witness who confusedly related his clumsy search after a suspected person by remarking, "Why, Scoggin look'd for his knife on the housetop." The words refer to Scogan's account of his search for a hare on the housetop (State Trials, vii. 1043).

He has been confused with Henry Scogan.
