= On Civility in Children =

Handbook written by Erasmus of Rotterdam

On Civility in Children (Latin: De civilitate morum puerilium) is a handbook written by Erasmus of Rotterdam, and is considered to be the first treatise in Western Europe on the moral and practical education of children. First published in 1530, it was addressed to the eleven-year-old Henry of Burgundy, son of Adolph, Prince of Veere, and gives instructions, in simple Latin, on how a boy should conduct himself in the company of adults. The book achieved immediate success and was translated into many languages. The first English version, by Robert Whittinton (or Whittington) was published in 1532, under the title of A Little Book of Good Manners for Children. Another translation by Thomas Paynell was issued in 1560.

The book is divided into seventeen sections, each dealing with an aspect of behaviour.

Norbert Elias describes On Civility in Children in his book The Civilizing Process as a landmark in the intellectual history of civility as a cultural concept in the West. As he points out, the book was reprinted so many times that a French typeface used for printing it in the 16th century became known simply as civilité and was used to print books of manners in the style of Erasmus's book until the 19th century.

== Sources ==
- Visser, Margaret (1991). The Rituals Of Dinner: the origins, evolution, eccentricities, and meaning of table manners (1st ed.). Harper Collins.
