= Philip Henderson =

British novelist and literature critic

Philip Prichard Henderson (17 February 1906 – 13 September 1977) was a British novelist and literature critic.

Henderson was born in Barnes, London, in the United Kingdom. After attending Bradfield College he worked as assistant editor of Everyman's Library from 1929 to 1932. During World War II he was employed as a fireman by the National Fire Service from 1939 to 1943, while at the same time writing books and articles as a free-lance author and editor. From 1943 to 1946 he co-edited the book trade magazine British Book News. He worked as an editor at the British Council from 1959 to 1965 and at the publishing house Chatto & Windus from 1964 to 1966.

His First Poems appeared in 1930 and his novel Events in the Early Life of Anthony Price: A Novel in 1935. Apart from composing complete editions of the poems of John Skelton and Emily Brontë, Henderson wrote several books on literary criticism, such as Literature and a Changing Civilisation (1935), The Novel Today (1936), and The Poet and Society (1939). Henderson also wrote several biographies of literary men, such as And Morning in His Eyes: A Book About Christopher Marlowe (1937), William Morris: His Life, Work, and Friends (1952), Samuel Butler: The Incarnate Bachelor (1953), The Life of Laurence Oliphant, Traveler, Diplomat, and Mystic (1956), Swinburne: Portrait of a Poet (1974) and Tennyson: Poet and Prophet (1978), as well as a biography of Richard I of England titled Richard Coeur de Lion: A Biography (1958).

He was awarded an Arts Council Award in 1967.
