= Andrew Boorde =

British doctor (c. 1490–1549)

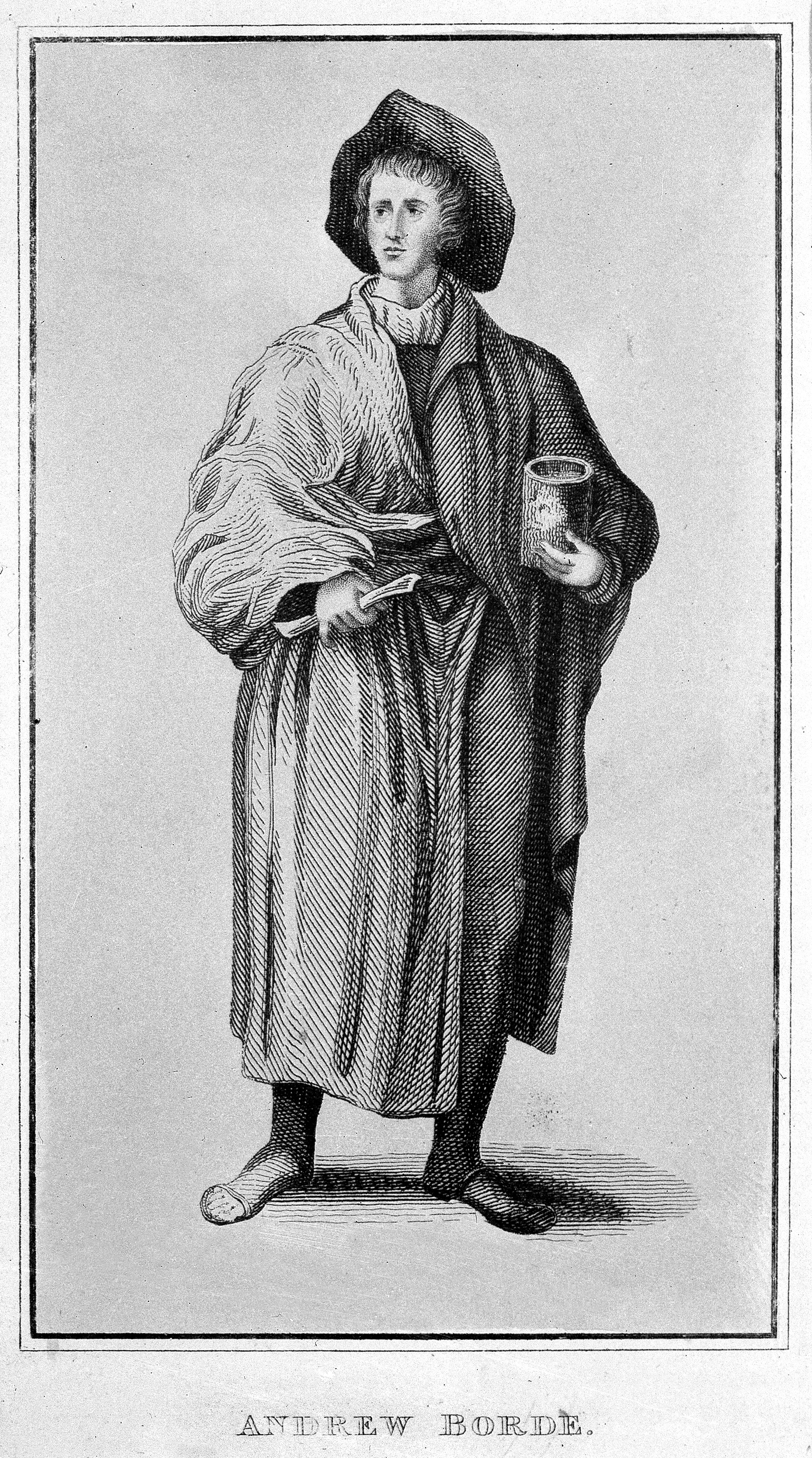
- Born: c. 1490; Boords Hill, Holms Dale, Sussex, England
- Died: April 1549 (aged c. 60)
- Occupations: traveller, physician, writer

Andrew Boorde (or Borde) (c. 1490 – April 1549) was an English traveller, physician and writer.

== Life ==
Born at Boords Hill, Holms Dale, Sussex, he was educated at the University of Oxford, and was admitted a member of the Carthusian order while under age. In 1521 he was dispensed from religion in order that he might act as suffragan bishop of Chichester, though he never actually filled the office, and in 1529 he was freed from his monastic vows, not being able to endure, as he said, "the rugorosite off your relygyon".

He then went abroad to study medicine, and on his return was summoned to attend the Duke of Norfolk. He subsequently visited the universities of Orléans, Poitiers, Toulouse, Montpellier and Wittenberg, saw the practice of surgery at Rome, and went on pilgrimage with others of his nation to Compostela in Galicia. In 1534 Boorde was again in London at the Charterhouse Monastery, and in 1536 wrote to Thomas Cromwell, complaining that he was in thraldom there.

Cromwell set him at liberty, and after entertaining him at his house at Bishop's Waltham in Hampshire, seems to have entrusted him with a mission to find out the state of public feeling abroad with regard to the English king. He writes to Cromwell from various places, and from Catalonia he sends him the seeds of rhubarb, two hundred years before that plant was generally cultivated in England. Two letters in 1535 and 1536 to the prior of the Charterhouse anxiously argue for his complete release from monastic vows.

In 1536 he wrote a letter from Glasgow, "wher I study and practyce physyck" meaning he worked in Scotland as a physician and not that he was there a medical student. Boorde frequented the house of the Earl of Arran and Lord Avondale, and gathered his observations about the Scots and the "devellyshe dysposicion of a Scottysh man, not to love nor favor an Englishe man". Around the year 1538 Boorde set out on his most extensive journey, visiting nearly all the countries of Europe except Russia and Turkey, and making his way to Jerusalem. Of these travels he wrote a full itinerary, lost by Cromwell, to whom it was sent.

He finally settled at Montpellier and before 1542 had completed his Fyrst Boke of the Introduction of Knowledge, which ranks as the earliest continental guidebook, his Dietary and his Brevyary. He probably returned to England in 1542, and lived at Winchester and perhaps at Pevensey. John Ponet, bishop of Winchester, in an Apology against Bishop Gardiner, relates as matter of common knowledge that in 1547 Doctor Boord, a physician and a holy man, who still kept the Carthusian rules of fasting and wearing a hair shirt, was convicted in Winchester of keeping in his house three loose women. For this offence, apparently, he was imprisoned in the Fleet, where he made his will on 9 April 1549. It was proved on the 25th of the same month. Thomas Hearne (Benedictus Abbas, i. p. 52) says that he went round like a quack doctor to country fairs, and therefore rashly supposed him to have been the original "Merry Andrew".

== Works ==
Boorde left works on domestic hygiene and medicine, and The Fyrst Boke of the Introduction of Knowledge. In it the Englishman describes himself and his foibles, his fickleness, his fondness for new fashions, and his obstinacy, in verse. Then follows a geographical description of the country, followed by a model dialogue in the Cornish language. Each country in turn is dealt with on similar lines.

His works include:

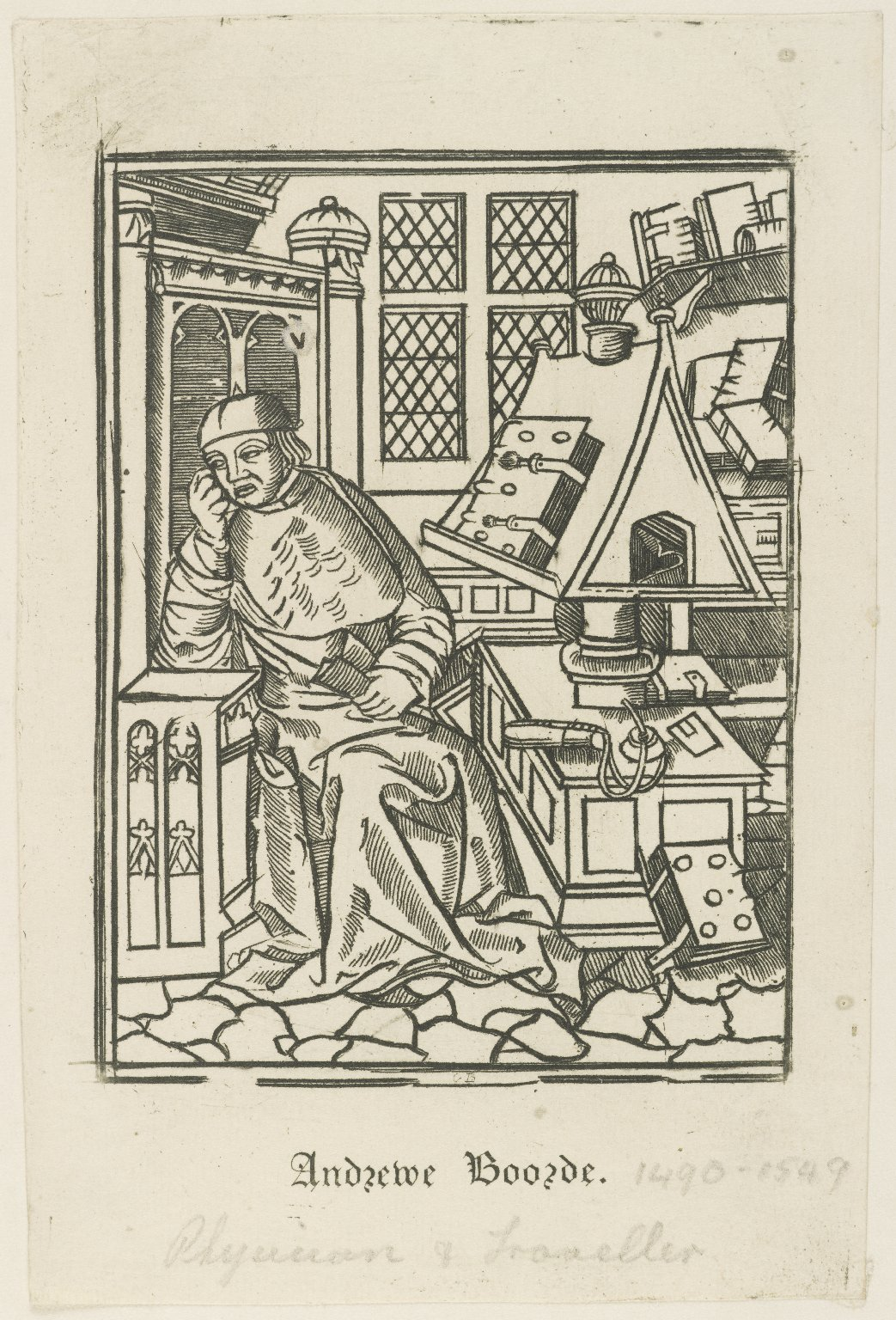
Image from Boorde's Breviary of Healthe.

- Here foloweth a Compenyous Regiment or Dyetary of health, made in Mountpyller (Thomas Colwell, 1542), of which there are undated and doubtless earlier editions;
- The Brevyary of health (1547?);
- The Princyples of Astronamy (1547?);
- The Peregrination of Doctor Board, printed by Thomas Hearne in Benedictus Abbas Petroburgensis, vol. ii. (1735);
- A Pronostycacyon or an Almanacke for the yere of our lorde MCCCCCXLV. made by Andrew Boorde.

Boordes Itinerary of Europe and Treatyse upon Berdes are lost. Attributed works include The book for to learn a man to be wise in building of his house for the health of body (London, 1540).

Several jest-books are attributed to him without authority: The Merie Tales of the Mad Men of Gotam (earliest extant edition, 1630), Scogins Jests (1626), A mery jest of the Mylner of Abyngton, with his wyfe, and his daughter, and of two poore scholers of Cambridge (printed by Wynkyn de Worde), and a Latin poem, Nos Vagabunduli.
