= Wentworth Smith =

English playwright (1571–c.1614)

- Born: Baptised 9 March 1571 (birth date unknown); London, England
- Died: Unknown
- Occupations: Playwright, scrivener
- Spouses: Agnes Gymber; Mary Poteman
- Children: Katherine Smith; Wentworth Smith
- Writing career
- Movement: English Renaissance theatre

Wentworth Smith (1571 – in or after 1614), was a minor English dramatist of the Elizabethan period who may have been responsible for some of the plays in the Shakespeare Apocrypha, though no work known to be his is extant.

== Life ==
Wentworth Smith, the son of one William Smith, was born in early March 1571 and baptized on 9 March 1571 at St James Garlickhythe, a parish church in the City of London. He married Agnes Gymber on 29 September 1594 in St Thomas the Apostle, another parish church in the city, later destroyed in the Great Fire of London. At the time of his marriage, Smith was employed as a scrivener, an occupation with which he continued to be identified as late as the death of his son in 1614.

Smith's first wife died in 1602 and he married Mary Poteman in Whitechapel on 16 May 1607. His children Katherine and Wentworth were baptized in 1607 and 1610, respectively; the younger Wentworth died in 1614, but it is not known when Smith himself died, or even if he was still living at the time of his son's death.

== Career as a playwright ==
That Wentworth Smith is known as a writer is due entirely to the presence of his name in the account book of Philip Henslowe. Between April 1601 and March 1603, Smith produced fifteen plays acted by the playing companies of Admiral's Men and Worcester's Men at Henslowe's Rose Theatre, some singly but most in partnership with other playwrights who also wrote for Henslowe. None of the works in which he had a hand is extant.

The last certain notice linking Smith to his dramatic profession is from 6 June 1605, when with one Elizabeth Lewes he witnessed the will of his dramatic collaborator William Haughton. He may have continued writing plays, though as Henslowe ceased recording the names of his writers after 1603 this cannot be confirmed.

== Possible identification with "W.S." and "W. Smith" ==
In addition to the works in which his hand is certain, Smith may have been responsible in whole or part for three plays of the period published under the initials "W. S." These were Locrine (1595), Thomas Lord Cromwell (1602) and The Puritan (1607). It is thought more probable that the initials are spurious, added to the published plays in an attempt by the publishers to suggest and capitalize on a connection with William Shakespeare, to whom indeed they were later misattributed. A like motivation might have held even if the initials were genuine, and have lain behind the abbreviation of the author's name.

Smith has also been suspected to be the W. Smith who wrote The Hector of Germany, acted about 1613 at the Red Bull and The Curtain and printed in 1615; in the dedication to this play "W. Smith" mentions a lost play he had written called The Freeman's Honour which was performed by the King's Men, probably before 1603 in their earlier incarnation as the Lord Chamberlain's Men. The actual author of this play, however, has been identified as the herald William Smith.

Smith is sometimes erroneously confused with another writer who signed his name W. Smith, the sonneteer William Smith who published a sonnet sequence entitled Chloris, or the Complaint of the Passionate Despised Shepherd in 1596.

== Known works ==
Plays in which Wentworth Smith is positively known to have had authorial hand include:

For the Admiral's Men, 1601-1602:

1. The Conquest of the West Indies, with John Day and William Haughton, April–September 1601.
2. Cardinal Wolsey, Part I, with Henry Chettle, Michael Drayton and Anthony Munday, August–November 1601.
3. The Six Clothiers, Part I, with Richard Hathwaye and William Haughton, October–November 1601.
4. The Six Clothiers, Part II, with Richard Hathwaye and William Haughton, October–November 1601. Apparently not finished.
5. Too Good to be True, with Henry Chettle and Richard Hathwaye, November 1601-January 1602.
6. Love Parts Friendship, with Henry Chettle, May 1602. E. K. Chambers conjectures that this play was published in 1605 as The Trial of Chivalry.
7. Merry as May be, with John Day and Richard Hathwaye, November 1602.

For Worcester's Men, 1602-1603:

1. Albere Galles, with Thomas Heywood, September 1602.
2. Marshal Osric, with Thomas Heywood, September 1602. Chambers suggests this may be The Royal King and the Loyal Subject, printed in 1637 as Heywood's alone.
3. The Three Brothers, October 1602. Also called The Two Brothers. H. H. Adams suggests this was a domestic tragedy, but Alfred Harbage describes it as Biblical history.
4. Lady Jane, Part I, with Henry Chettle, Thomas Dekker, Thomas Heywood and John Webster, October 1602. Thought to be the same as (or an early version of) the extant Sir Thomas Wyatt of Dekker and Webster.
5. The Black Dog of Newgate, Part I, with John Day, Richard Hathwaye and another, November 1602-February 1603.
6. The Black Dog of Newgate, Part II, with John Day, Richard Hathwaye and another, November 1602-February 1603. This and the previous were presumably plays on notorious criminal Luke Hutton.
7. The Unfortunate General, with John Day and Richard Hathwaye, January 1603.
8. The Italian Tragedy, March 1603.
