= Edmund Bolton =

English historian and poet

This is an article about the 17th-century poet. For the reality TV participant, see Beauty and the Geek (UK TV series)

Edmund Mary Bolton (c. 1575 – c. 1633) was an English historian and poet who was born, by his own account, in 1575.

== Life ==
Nothing is known of his family or origins, although he referred to himself as a distant relative of George Villiers. Brought up a Roman Catholic, he was educated at Trinity Hall, Cambridge. Bolton then lived in London at the Inner Temple. Both at Cambridge and in London, he participated in the literary life of the time. At Cambridge, he met John Selden, John Coke, and others. In London, he wrote occasional verse, contributing poems to England's Helicon, and commendatory verses to William Camden's Britannia and Ben Jonson's Volpone. He became a retainer of Villiers, and through the Duke's influence, Bolton secured a small place at the court of James I. Bolton married Margaret Porter, the sister of Endymion Porter, another of the Duke's retinue and a minor poet.

Throughout his life, Bolton was oppressed by poverty, about which he freely informed his numerous prospective patrons. These included, at one time or another, Cecil, Henry Howard, and even Edward Alleyn. He was caught up in Charles's campaign against recusancy in 1628; he was imprisoned first in the Fleet Prison and then in the Marshalsea, where he languished for want of a person of power to intercede for him.

Bolton was still living in 1633, but appears to have died that year or shortly after.

== Proposed Academy ==
With the support of Villiers, Bolton advanced a scheme for an English Academy. He proposed a three-part structure. The academy would include learned aristocrats as auxiliary members, and the Lord Chancellor and the two university chancellors as "tutelaries"; but the heart of the enterprise was to be the group of "essentials" who would carry on the work of licensing publications that did not fall under the purview of the Archbishop of Canterbury and advancing antiquarian and historical study. James seems to have approved of the proposal, but the plan died with that king.

== Works ==
One of the most important of his numerous works is Hypercritica, a short critical treatise begun about 1618 but not finished till 1621 (a date establishable by examination of its manuscript in the Bodleian Library, which refers to Bolton's contemporary Francis Bacon as Viscount St Alban, a title Bacon acquired in that year). This is valuable for its notices of contemporary authors such as Ben Jonson, whom he praises as the greatest English poet; this manuscript was reprinted in Joseph Haslewood's Ancient Critical Essays (vol. ii., 1815). Another important work of his is Nero Caesar, or Monarchie Depraved (1624), which takes special note of British affairs. Unsurprisingly, Bolton praised the virtues of a strong monarchy and asserted the horror of any rebellion, even against unjust authority. In the preface, Bolton hints that James had encouraged the work, and the language of the whole text is a more or less evident bid for the patronage of Charles I. The bid failed.

Hypercritica was a kind of prolegomenon to Bolton's most ambitious project, never completed: an updated history of Britain based on archives and other original sources, free of both the cant of medieval historians and the clumsiness of Tudor chroniclers such as Stow. Like the Academy, this work never materialized, though Bolton continued to work on related projects throughout his life. A surviving contents-list includes a projected chapter on "Joseph of Arimathea and the Abbie of Glastenberie", which raises the interesting possibility that Bolton might have been intending to use this controversial figure in a bid to reconcile Protestant and Catholic antiquarian narratives. In the early 1630s, he attempted to interest London's city government in an updated history of the city in English and Latin. After some initial interest, the aldermen balked at the cost (more than 3000 pounds). Shortly before his death, Bolton gave the manuscript to Selden; it is now lost. Also was thought lost a companion to the work on Nero, a biography of Tiberius. But it was bought by Aprosio, a collector from Ventimiglia, in the 17th century and then sold to the bibliophile Giacomo Filippo Durazzo; it is now part of the Durazziana.
