= The Durham Proverbs =

Medieval proverbs

The Durham Proverbs is a collection of 46 medieval proverbs from various sources. They were written down as a collection, in the eleventh century, on some pages (pages 43 verso to 45 verso, between a hymnal and a collection of canticles) of a manuscript that were originally left blank. The manuscript is currently in the collection of Durham Cathedral, to which it was donated in the eighteenth century. The Proverbs form the first part of the manuscript. The second part, to which it is bound, is a copy of Ælfric's Grammar (minus its glossary). Each proverb is written in both Latin and Old English, with the former preceding the latter. Olof Arngart's opinion is that the Proverbs were originally in Old English and translated to Latin, but this has since been disputed in a conference paper by T. A. Shippey (Shippey 1989).

== Origin ==
While Richard Marsden's introduction in The Cambridge Old English Reader discusses the essentials of the Durham Proverbs, there is still more to be learned. The Durham Proverbs are held in a manuscript that is kept in the library of Durham Cathedral, which is why they are named the "Durham" Proverbs. The original home of the manuscript is thought most likely to have been in Canterbury. The original manuscript of the Durham Proverbs contains copies of Ælfric's own work. Several of the proverbs also appear in later 13th-century works, which suggests a degree of ubiquity in medieval English society. The commonalities between the Latin versions of the proverbs and the Old English translations, in more than one manuscript, suggest that there was a common source from which the Durham Proverbs were created in Old English from Latin.

== Background and history ==
The Durham Proverbs are considered to have been used to document everyday business of the people of Anglo-Saxon England. The proverbs were used in monastic schools to teach text along with other texts such as the Disticha Catonis (also known as the "Dicts of Cato") and a Middle English collection titled the Proverbs of Hendyng. Several of the proverbs have parallels within other proverbs listed below, as well as the Old English Disticha Catonis and the Proverbs of Hendyng. Despite their use, the source of these proverbs is largely debated and still considered unknown.

Olof Arngart's notes on the Durham Proverbs say that some of the proverbs have a biblical reference. The book of Proverbs in the Bible resembles the Durham Proverbs by providing teachings on morals for a society of its time. The "Dicts of Cato" were also influenced by the Durham Proverbs, which in turn, influenced Christianity. The first of the Durham Proverbs can even be seen in the Dict of Cato 23.

== Purpose ==
The Durham Proverbs comprise a mixture of true proverbs and maxims, and are clearer in this regard, according to linguist and Anglo-Saxon anthropologist Nigel Barley (Barley 1972), than the collection of Old English poems entitled the Maxims are — the latter's status being comparatively unclear. According to the Encyclopedia of the Middle Ages a maxim is a short statement that (as Laingui puts it) "sets out a general principle", that briefly expounds a liturgical, legal, moral, or political rule as a short mnemonic device. The Durham Proverbs are called proverbs because the collection has what Marsden calls "transferability" to man.

The Durham Proverbs are not as serious as some of the Old English maxims and can even be considered humorous in some areas. The proverbs are similar to fables or parables seen in Modern English. Each proverb has a lesson to teach, as do the fables and parables. The proverbs' have a resemblance to Old English poetry. Using alliteration and rhythm, the proverbs show some of the earliest uses of words and phrases, such as "cwæþ se (þe)" which translates to "quoth he who", and is later seen in more Middle English sources. In addition to their importance of gaining knowledge of the Old English history, the proverbs include many words that are not seen anywhere else in Old English writings. Arngart suggests that the study of the proverbs "furnishes insights into contemporary folklore and social life".

== The proverbs themselves ==
The proverbs have their roots in gnomic poetry, and show a relationship in some places to the Disticha Catonis and other works of the surviving Anglo-Saxon corpus. The Old English versions are sometimes (but not always) alliterative, or in verse form, and employ the same formulae with "sceal" and "byþ" as other works do. However, they have a distinctive flavour of their own, one outstanding characteristic of which is the humorous expression that they embody (as in number 11, for example) — a quality that is lacking in the gnomes. A yet more distinctive feature is how often the proverbs echo the verse of other works, such as the echo of The Wanderer in number 23.

First 25 Durham Proverbs
No.	Latin original	Old English original	Modern English translation of O.E.
1	Portio beatitudinis.	Geþyld byð middes ēa[des].	Patience is a part of happiness.
2	Amicus tam prope quam longe bonus est.	Frēond dēah feor ge nēah: byð near nyttra.	A friend is good, far or near; a nearer one is more useful.
3	Amicus in necessitate probandus est.	Æt þearfe mann sceal freonda cunnian.	In (times of) need, one must test friends.
4	Amicos plures nemo habet.	Nafað ǣnigmann frēonda tō feala.	No man has too many friends.
5	Postule[t] coram amico qui penuriam suam predicat.	Beforan his frēonde biddeþ, sē þe his wǣdel mǣneþ.	He who laments his poverty is a beggar before his friend.
6	Bonus annus quando canis corvo exibet.	Gōd gēr byþ þonne se hund þām hrefne gyfeð.	It is a good year when the hound gives to the raven.
7	Sepe in [u]ile sacculo fulget aurum.	Oft on sōtigum bylige searowa licgað.	Treasures often lie in a sooty bag.
8	Post medum maxime sitit.	Hwīlum æfter medo menn mǣst geþyrsteð.	At times a man thirsts the most after the mead(-drinking).
9	Post amabilem hominen durissime ted[e]t.	Æfter leofan menn langað swīðost.	One longs greatly for the beloved man.
10	Nunc in iudicio porci dixit maritus sedens in apro.	Nū hit ys on swīnes dōme, cwæð se ceorl sæt on eoferes hricge.	'Now it is at the discretion of the pig,' said the churl who sat astride the boar's back.
11	[N]eque confiderem liceat bene ambulasset dixit qu[i] uidit [s]trigas capite pregredientes.	Ne swā þēah trēowde þēah þū teala ēode, cwæþ sē þe geseah hægtessan æfter hēafde geo[ngan.]	'Nonetheless, I would not trust you though you walked well,' said he who saw a witch passing along on her head.
12	Omne in ore quod in mente.	Eall on mūðe þæt on mōde.	
13	Commune peccunia propinquorum.	Gemǣne sceal māga feoh.	
14	Homo facit sicut fit quando potest sicut uult.	Man dēþ swā hē byþ þonne hē mōt swā hē wile.	
15	[N]ec caro carnem emendat dixit qui caccabum plenum ponderosum coxit.	Ne saga sagan, cwæð sē gesēah hwer fulne hēalena sēoþan.	(Note: Marsden suggests there is a word that has been omitted here, and thus there is an unclear translation that could hold various meanings. When Marsden attempted to compare this to the Latin version, it was quite different. Marsden says, "So far, we must accept defeat on this one".)
16	[P]rudent[i] facile caus[a] insinuatur.	Eaðe [wīs] man mæg witan spell and ēac secgan.	A wise man can easily master an argument [or question], and also pronounce upon it.
17	Cecus doubus oculis qui pectore non cernit.	Blind byþ bām ēagum, sē þe brēostum ne starat.	He is blind of both eyes who does not discern his own breast.
18	[S]ol[i] illi non contendunt qui in unum non conueniunt.	Ðā ne sacað þe ætsamne ne bēoð.	Those do not quarrel who are not together.
19	[Non omnia] uera dicend[a] sunt.	Ne dēah eall sōþ āsǣd ne eall sār ætwiten.	It does no good (for) all truth (to be) told nor all wrong imputed. (Note: For subsequent variations on this same proverb, from Chaucer to Horman's Vulgaria, see Whiting & Whiting 1968, pp. 533.)
20	Bene loquere sic bene facias.	Gyf þū well sprece, wyrc æfter swā.	Practice what you preach.
21	Veritas seips[a]m semper declarat.	Soþ hit sylf acþeð.	The truth announces itself.
22	[S]olu[m] igna[u]us [metuere pot]est.	Earh mæg þæt an þæt he him ondræde.	A coward can do only one thing: fear. (Note: "Earh" means coward here and is glossed as such in contemporary works ("timidorum militum" in Aldhelm's De Virginitate being translated as "eargra cempana"), although the more general meaning of the word in O.E. was "sloth" or "sluggard".)
23	Ne[c] cito pauidus nec ilico arri[d]ens qui esse debet.	Nē sceal man tō ǣr forht nē tō ǣr fægen.	One should be neither too soon fearful nor too soon glad. (Note: The proverb has echoes of The Wanderer ("nē tō forht nē tō fægen", 150). The twain have been variously translated. T. A. Shippey, who writes the O.E. of the Proverbs as "ǣrforht" and "ǣrfægen", explains "glad-too-soon" as meaning optimistic. The Latin version of the proverb is "nec ilico arrigens", which translates as "nor quick to rouse" rather than the "glad" or "happy" usually ascribed to the O.E. form. (For further exploration of the Latin see Arngart 1983.))
24	Reus propiti[ati]one indiget.	Forworht mann friþes behofað.	
25	Melius centum adire loc[os] quam centum perpati contumelias.	Selre byþ þæt mon hund heona gesece þonne man hund hynþa geþolie.	It is better for a man to seek a hundred places than to endure a hundred shames.
