= John Skelton (poet) =

English poet and tutor (1463–1529)

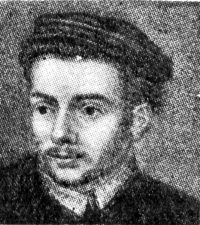
- Born: c.1463 Diss, Norfolk
- Died: 21 June 1529 (aged 65–66); Westminster
- Resting place: St Margaret's, Westminster
- Occupations: Poet, tutor

John Skelton, also known as John Shelton (c. 1463 – 21 June 1529) was an English poet, playwright, priest, and tutor to King Henry VIII. Writing in a period of linguistic transition between Middle English and Early Modern English, Skelton is one of the most important poets of the early Tudor period. As a poet, Skelton is mostly remembered for his invectives and satires, often written in a highly irregular metre now called Skeltonics. However, Skelton's poetic oeuvre (which survives only in part) encompasses a wide range of genres, including dream vision, parody, ballad, panegyric, and Latin elegiac. He also wrote the first secular morality play in English, Magnyfycence, an important landmark in the development of English Renaissance theatre.

Skelton served as a tutor to the young Henry VIII, and lived in his court for much of his adult life. He took up the style of poet laureate, possibly after appointment by Henry, and was rector of Diss for nearly 30 years. Skelton was involved in the Grammarians' War, and, in his last years, came into conflict with Thomas Wolsey. Fearing for his life, he took sanctuary in Westminster, where he died in 1529. He was buried in St. Margaret's Church, although no trace of the tomb remains.

As a poet, Skelton's reputation has been mixed. Though very popular in the decades after his death, by the late 16th century his reputation had declined. Derided by Alexander Pope as "beastly", it was only in the 20th century that his work began to be seen more favorably, where his exponents include W. H. Auden and C. S. Lewis.

== Education ==
Skelton is said to have been educated at Oxford, though it is documented that he studied at Cambridge. He could be the "one Scheklton" mentioned by William Cole as taking his M.A. degree at Cambridge in 1484, but this is unconfirmed. In 1490, William Caxton, in the preface to The Boke of Eneydos compyled by Vyrgyle, refers to him as though Skelton already had a scholarly reputation when the book was published. "But I pray mayster John Skelton," he says, "late created poete laureate in the unyversite of Oxenforde, to oversee and correct this sayd booke ... for him I know for suffycyent to expowne and englysshe every dyffyculte that is therin. For he hath late translated the epystlys of Tulle, and the boke of dyodorus siculus, and diverse other works ... in polysshed and ornate termes craftely ... suppose he hath drunken of Elycons well."

The laureateship referred to was a degree in rhetoric. As well as Oxford, in 1493 Skelton received the same honour at Cambridge, and also at Leuven. He found a patron in the pious and learned Countess of Richmond, Henry VII's mother, for whom he wrote Of Mannes Lyfe the Peregrynacioun, a lost translation of Guillaume de Diguileville's Pèlerinage de la vie humaine. An elegy (1489) on the death of Henry Percy, fourth earl of Northumberland, is among his earliest poems, as may be another (Of the death of the noble prince Kynge Edwarde the forth), though this latter is now usually thought not to be by Skelton.

== Poet laureate ==
In the last decade of the 15th century he was appointed tutor to Prince Henry (afterwards King Henry VIII). He wrote for his pupil a lost Speculum principis, and Erasmus, in 1500, dedicated an ode to the prince speaking of Skelton as unum Britannicarum literarum lumen ac decus. This Latin phrase roughly translates as "the one light and glory of British letters." In 1498 he was successively ordained sub-deacon, deacon and priest. He seems to have been imprisoned in 1502, but no reason is known for his disgrace. Two years later he retired from regular court attendance to become rector of Diss, a benefice he retained nominally until his death.

Skelton frequently signed himself "regius orator" and poet-laureate, but there is no record of any emoluments paid in connection with these dignities, although the Abbé du Resnel, author of Recherches sur les poètes couronnez, asserts that he had seen a patent (1513–1514) in which Skelton was appointed poet-laureate to Henry VIII. As rector of Diss he caused great scandal among his parishioners, who thought him, says Anthony Wood, more fit for the stage than the pew or the pulpit. He was rumoured to be secretly married to a woman who lived in his house, and earned the hatred of the Dominican friars by his fierce satire. He consequently came under the formal censure of Richard Nix, the bishop of the diocese, and appears to have been temporarily suspended. After his death a collection of farcical tales, no doubt chiefly, if not entirely, apocryphal, gathered round his name—The Merie Tales of Skelton.

During the rest of the century he figured in the popular imagination as an incorrigible practical joker. His sarcastic wit made him enemies, among them: Sir Christopher Garnesche or Garneys, Alexander Barclay, William Lilly and the French scholar Robert Gaguin (c. 1425–1502). With Garneys he engaged in a regular "flyting", undertaken, he says, at the king's command, but Skelton's four poems read as if the abuse in them were dictated by genuine anger. Earlier in his career he found a friend and patron in Cardinal Wolsey, and the dedication to the cardinal of his Replycacion is couched in the most flattering terms. But in 1522, when Wolsey in his capacity of Papal legate dissolved convocation at St Paul's, Skelton put in circulation the couplet:

Gentle Paul, laie doune thy sweard
For Peter of Westminster hath shaven thy beard.

In Colyn Cloute he incidentally attacked Wolsey in a general satire on the clergy. Speke, Parrot and Why Come Ye nat to Courte? are direct and fierce invectives against the cardinal. To avoid another arrest Skelton took sanctuary in Westminster Abbey. He was kindly received by the abbot, John Islip, who continued to protect him until his death. According to his biographer, Edward Braynewood, Skelton was buried before the high altar of Saint Margaret's Church with this inscription on alabaster: Joannes Skeltonus vates pierius hic situs est (Here lies John Skelton, Pierian bard).

== His works ==
In his Garlande of Laurell Skelton gives a long list of his works, only a few of which are extant. The garland in question was worked for him in silks, gold and pearls by the ladies of the Countess of Surrey at Sheriff Hutton Castle, where he was the guest of the duke of Norfolk. The composition includes complimentary verses to the various ladies, and a good deal of information about himself. But it is as a satirist that Skelton merits attention. The Bowge of Court is directed against the vices and dangers of court life. He had already in his Boke of the Thre Foles drawn on Alexander Barclay's version of the Narrenschijf of Sebastian Brant, and this more elaborate, imaginative poem belongs to the same class.

Skelton, falling into a dream at Harwich, sees a stately ship in the harbour called the Bowge of Court, the owner of which is the "Dame Saunce Pere", Her merchandise is Favour; the helmsman Fortune; and the poet, who figures as Drede (modesty), finds on board F'avell (the flatterer), Suspect, Harvy Hafter (the clever thief), Dysdayne, Ryotte, Dyssymuler and Subtylte. These figures explain themselves in turn, until at last Drede, who finds they are secretly his enemies, is about to save his life by jumping overboard, when he wakes with a start. Both poems are written in the seven-lined rhyme royal, a Continental verse-form first used in English by Geoffrey Chaucer, but it is in an irregular metre of his own—known as "Skeltonics"—that his most characteristic work was accomplished.

The Boke of Phyllyp Sparowe, the lament of Jane Scroop, a schoolgirl in the Benedictine convent of Carrow near Norwich, for her dead bird, was no doubt inspired by Catullus. It is a poem of some 1,400 lines and takes many liberties with the formularies of the church. The digressions are considerable. It depicts Jane as having a wide reading in the romances of Charlemagne, of the Round Table, The Four Sons of Aymon and the Trojan cycle. Skelton finds space to give an opinion of Geoffrey Chaucer, John Gower and John Lydgate. Whether we can equate this opinion, voiced by the character of Jane, with Skelton's own is contentious. It would appear that he seems to have realised Chaucer's value as a master of the English language. Gower's matter was, Jane tells us, "worth gold", but his English she regards as antiquated. The verse in which the poem is written, called from its inventor "Skeltonical", is here turned entirely to whimsical use. The lines are usually six-syllabled but vary in length, and rhyme in groups of two, three, four and even more. It is not far removed from the old alliterative English verse, and well fitted to be chanted by the minstrels who had sung the old ballads. For its comic admixture of Latin Skelton had abundant example in French and Low Latin macaronic verse. He makes frequent use of Latin and French words to carry out his exacting system of frequently recurring rhymes. This breathless, voluble measure was in Skelton's energetic hands an admirable vehicle for invective, but it easily degenerated into doggerel.

By the end of the 16th century he was a "rude rayling rimer" (Puttenham, Arte of English Poesie), and at the hands of Pope and Warton he fared even worse. His own criticism is a just one:

For though my ryme be ragged,
Tattered and jagged,
Rudely rayne beaten,
Rusty and moughte eaten,
It hath in it some pyth.

Colyn Cloute represents the average country man who gives his opinions on the state of the church. It is an indictment of the sins of the clergy before the Reformation. He exposes their greed and ignorance, the ostentation of the bishops and the common practice of simony, taking care to explain the accusations do not include all and that he writes in defence of the church. He repeatedly, indirectly hits at Wolsey in this satire. Speke, Parrot has only been preserved in a fragmentary form, and is very obscure. It was apparently composed at different times, but in the latter part of the composition he openly attacks Wolsey. In Why Come Ye nat to Courte? there is no attempt at disguise. The wonder is not that Skelton had to seek sanctuary, but that he had any opportunity of doing so. He rails at Wolsey's ostentation, at his almost royal authority, his overbearing manner to suitors high and low, and taunts him with his mean extraction. This scathing invective was not allowed to be printed in the cardinal's lifetime, but no doubt widely circulated in manuscript and by repetition. The charge of coarseness regularly brought against Skelton is based chiefly on The Tunnynge of Elynoare Rummynge, a realistic description in the same metre of the drunken women who gathered at a well-known ale-house kept by Elynour Rummynge at Leatherhead, not far from the royal palace of Nonsuch.

"Skelton Laureate against the Scottes" is a fierce song of triumph celebrating the victory of Flodden. "Jemmy is ded And closed in led, That was theyr owne Kynge", says the poem; but there was an earlier version written before the news of James IV's death had reached London. This, the earliest singly printed ballad in the language, was entitled A Ballade of the Scottysshe Kynge, and was rescued in 1878 from the wooden covers of a copy of Huon de Bordeaux. "Howe the douty Duke of Albany, lyke a cowarde knight" deals with the Campaign of 1523, and contains a panegyric of Henry VIII. To this is attached an envoi to Wolsey, but it surely was misplaced, for both satires on the cardinal are of earlier date.

Skelton also wrote three plays, only one of which survives. Magnificence is one of the best examples of the morality play. It deals with the same topic as his satires—the evils of ambition. The play's moral, namely "how suddenly worldly wealth doth decay", was a favourite with him. Thomas Warton in his The History of English Poetry described another piece titled Nigramansir, printed by Wynkyn de Worde in 1504. It deals with simony and the love of money in the church; but no copy is known to exist, and suspicion has been cast on Warton's statement.

Illustration of Skelton's hold on public imagination is supplied from the stage. A play (1600) called Scogan and Shelton, by Richard Hathwaye and William Rankins, is mentioned by Henslowe. In Anthony Munday's Downfall of Robert, Earl of Huntingdon, Skelton acts the part of Friar Tuck, and Ben Jonson in his masque, The Fortunate Isles, introduced Skogan and Skelton in like habits as they lived.

Very few of Skelton productions are dated; their titles are here necessarily abbreviated. De Worde printed the Bowge of Court twice. Divers Batettys and dyties salacious devysed by Master Shelton Laureat, and Shelton Laureate agaynste a comely Coystroune have no date or printer's name, but are evidently from the press of Richard Pynson, who also printed Replycacion against certain yang scalers, dedicated to Wolsey. The Garlande or Chapelet of Laurell was printed by Richard Faukes (1523); Magnificence, A goodly interlude, probably by John Rastell about 1533, reprinted (1821) for the Roxburghe Club. Hereafter foloweth the Boke of Phyllyp Sparowe was printed by Richard Kele (1550?), Robert Toy, Antony Kitson (1560?), Abraham Veale (1570?), John Walley, John Wyght (1560?). Hereafter foloweth certaine bokes compyled by mayster Shelton ... including "Speke, Parrot", "Ware the Hawke", "Elynoure Rumpiynge and others", was printed by Richard Lant (1550?), John King and Thomas March (1565?), and by John Day (1560). Hereafter foloweth a title boke called Colyn Cloute and Hereafter ... Why Come Ye nat to Courte? were printed by Richard Kele (1550?) and in numerous subsequent editions. Pithy, plesaunt and profitable workes of maister Shelton, Poete Laureate. Nowe collected and newly published was printed in 1568, and reprinted in 1736. A scarce reprint of Filnour Rummin by Samuel Rand appeared in 1624.

Five of Skelton's "Tudor Portraits", including The Tunnying of Elynour Rummyng were set to music by Ralph Vaughan Williams in or around 1935. Although he changed the text to suit his music, the sentiments are well expressed. The four others are "My Pretty Bess", "Epitaph of John Jayberd of Diss", "Jane Scroop (her lament for Philip Sparrow)", and "Jolly Rutterkin". The music is rarely performed, although it is considered funny, and captures the coarseness of Skelton in an inspired way.

Until recent decades, the only critical edition of Skelton was the two-volume The Poetical Works of John Shelton by Rev. Alexander Dyce (2 volumes, 1843) However, more recent scholarship has found that several pieces which Dyce considered Skelton's are almost certainly not by him, and new (authentic) works have since been found. As of 2025, John Scattergood's The Complete English Poems of John Kelton (1983, revised 2015) and David R. Carlson's The Latin Writings of John Skelton (1991) form the standard editions of his work.

== Family ==
John Skelton's lineage is difficult to prove. Some scholars have thought he may have been related to Sir John Shelton and his children, who also came from Norfolk. Sir John's daughter, Mary Shelton, was a mistress of Henry VIII's during the tenure of her cousin, Anne Boleyn. Mary Shelton was the main editor and contributor to the Devonshire MS, a collection of poems written by various members of the court.

It is said that several of Skelton's works were inspired by women who were to become mothers to two of Henry VIII's six wives. Elizabeth Boleyn (Howard), Countess of Wiltshire and Ormonde, was said to be so beautiful that Skelton compared her to Cressida. This comparison may have been a double entendre, because Cressida, as depicted by Chaucer in his work Troilus and Criseyde, was notable as a symbol of female inconstancy. A popular but unverifiable legend suggests several poems were inspired by Margery Wentworth; she is noted as one of the women portrayed in Skelton's Garland of Laurel. She also is reported as having an eponymous poem written in her honour by Skelton. Elizabeth was the mother of Anne Boleyn, Henry's second wife; Margery was the mother of his third, Jane Seymour.

== See also ==
- Grammarians' War
