= Englands Helicon =

1600 poetry anthology by John Flaskett

Englands Helicon is an anthology of Elizabethan pastoral poems compiled by John Flaskett, and first published in 1600. There was an enlarged edition in 1614. The word Helicon refers to the Greek mountain on which, in Greek mythology, two springs sacred to the Muses were located.

The poets involved cannot all be identified, since there are a number of poems marked as 'anonymous'. The others were written by Edmund Bolton, William Byrd, Henry Chettle, Michael Drayton, Robert Greene, Christopher Marlowe, Anthony Munday, George Peele, Walter Raleigh, Henry Constable, William Shakespeare, Edward de Vere, Philip Sidney, Edmund Spenser, John Wootton, William Smith. The most celebrated poem is Marlowe's 'Come live with me and be my love'. This and several other lyrics have musical settings extant, in this case by William Corkine.

== Poets of the anthology ==
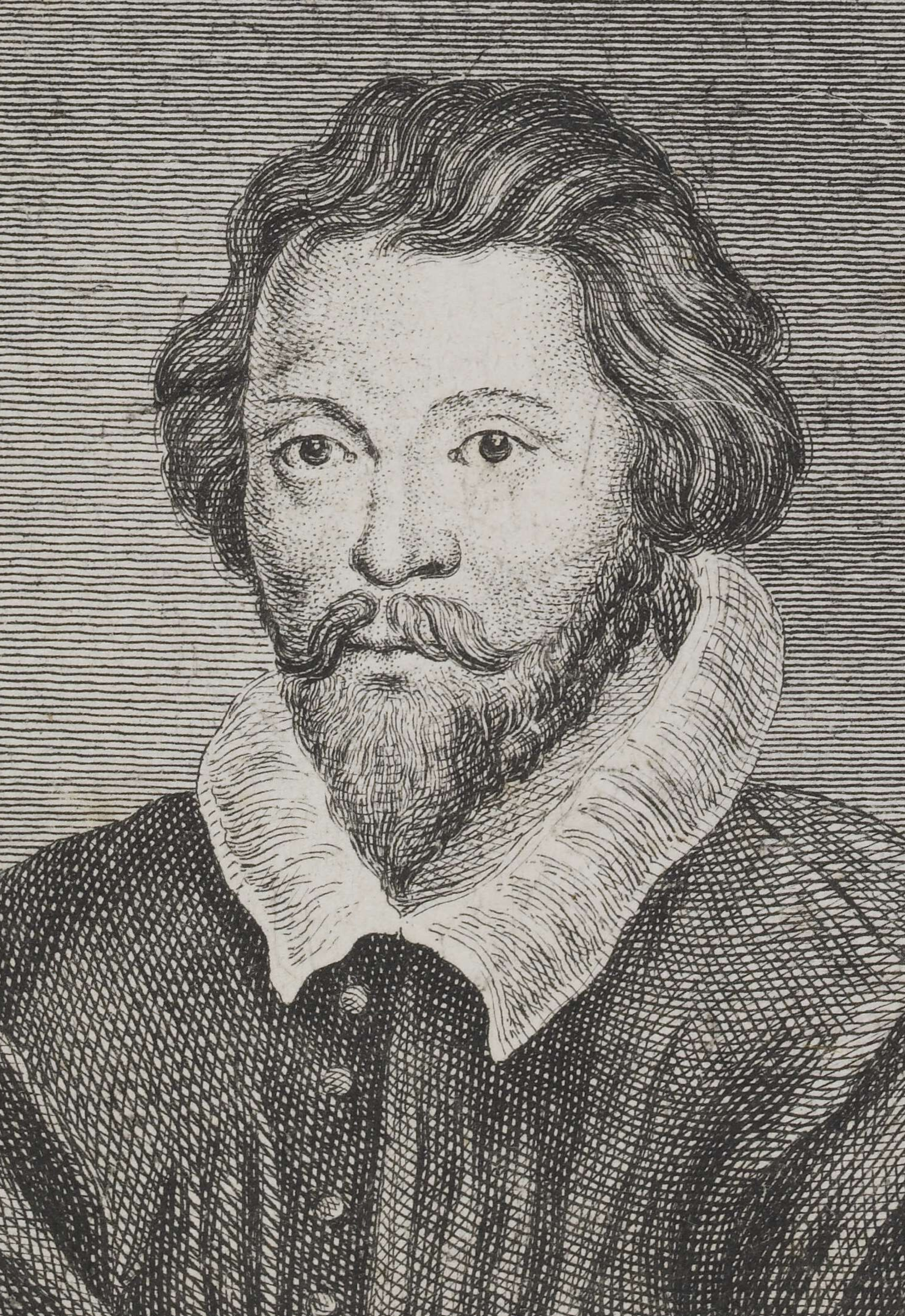
William Byrd

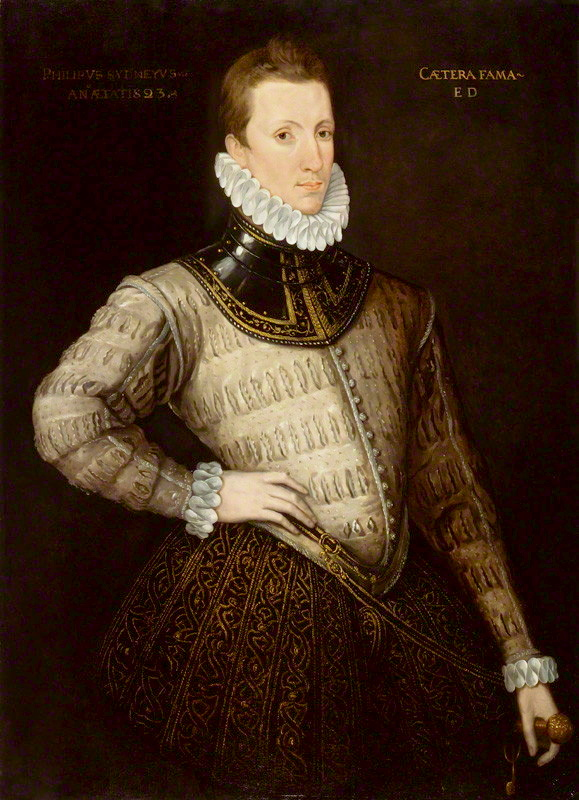
Philip Sidney

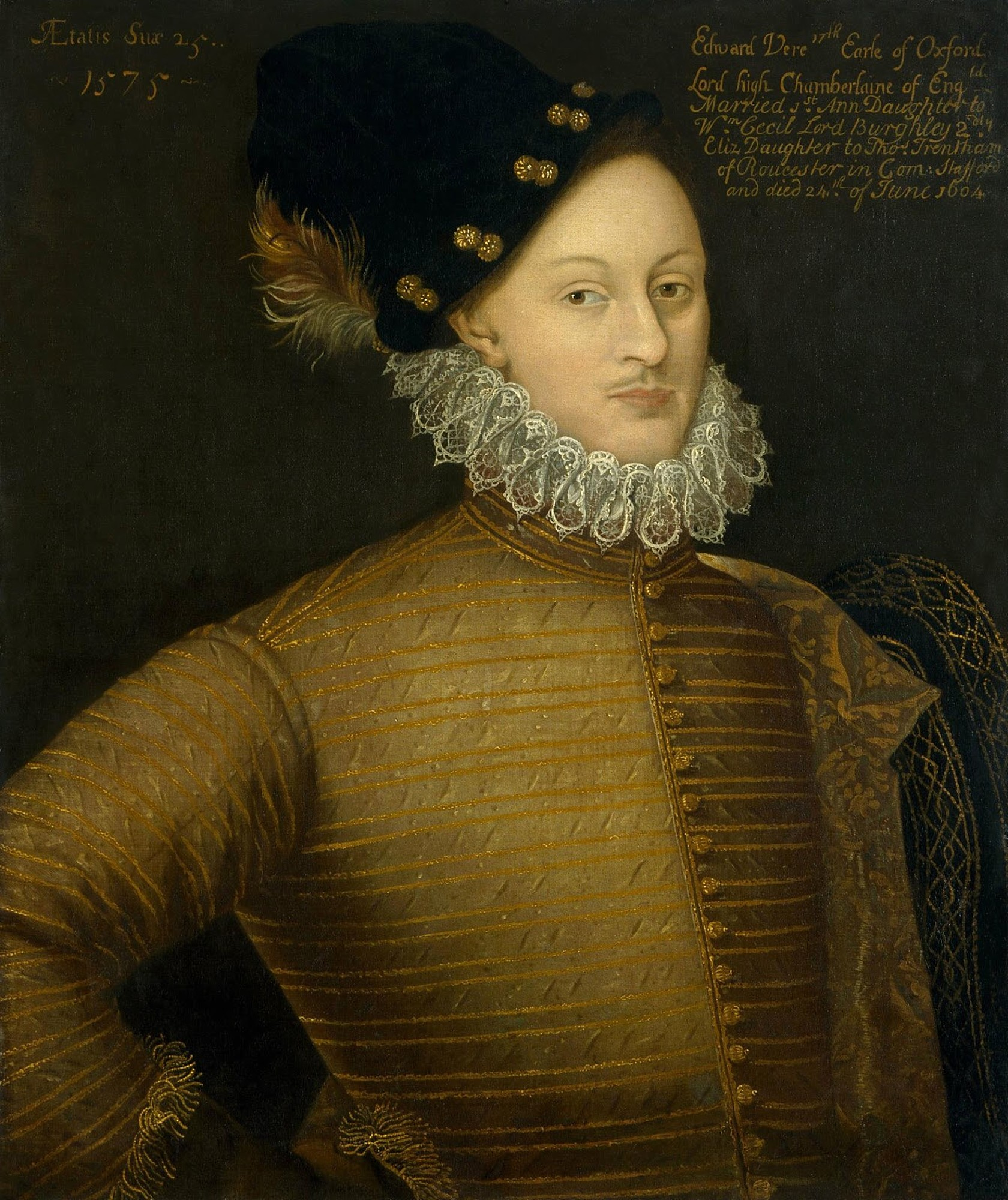
Edward de Vere

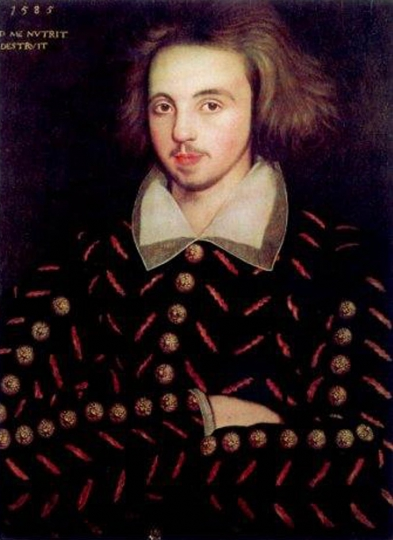
Christopher Marlowe

William Shakespeare
