= The Tunning of Elynour Rummyng =

1550 English poem

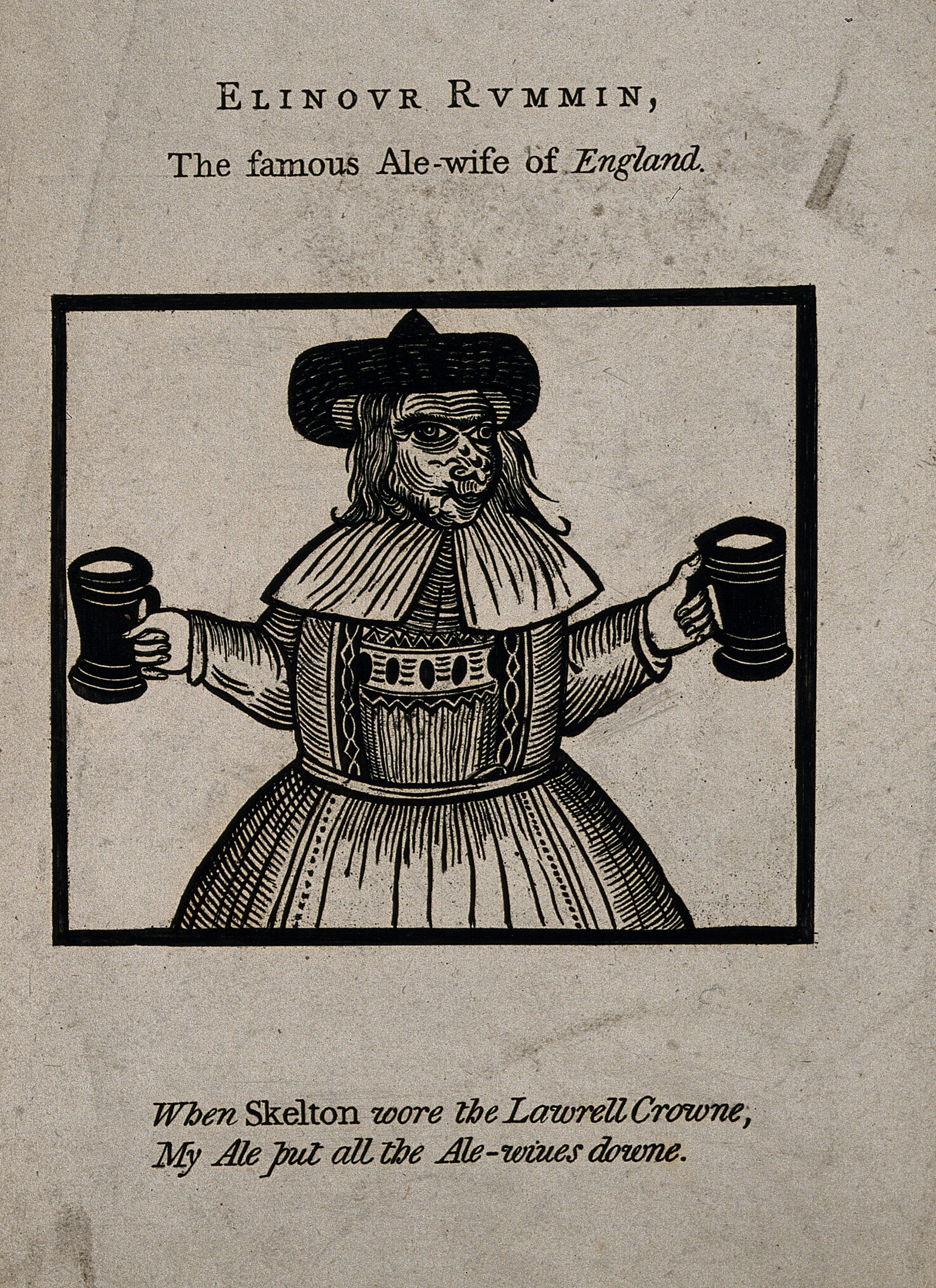

The Tunning of Elynour Rummyng is a long raucous, misogynous and libellous poem by English poet John Skelton. The poem concerns a publican who was fined in Leatherhead in 1525 for selling short measures at expensive prices. Her name is recorded as, Eleanor Romyngr or Elynour Rummyng.

The poem was printed by Richard Lant sometime in 1550 and presents what many would consider disgusting images of rural drinking and drunkenness. For all its gritty description, Skelton has modeled the poem on Church liturgy of that time. The verse form itself closely resembles a liturgical chant. The poem is held as an example of misogyny. Women and men brewed ale for sale but it was frequently women who were charged with giving short measure. Elynour's husband was also a brewer but he was not brought to court.

Elynour is a character in the poem who runs a "public house," or pub. In the early 16th century, the male or female owner of the pub not only sold the ale, but also probably brewed it. Elynour easily acquires all her ingredients for quite acceptable ale from the local farmers in southern England where her pub was apparently located. Nevertheless, the kind of hard language which is found in the poem, is not uncommon as "bar talk." Today, much like in the 16th century, many brands of beer have been derisively referred to as "pig piss" perhaps because of beer's pale yellowish color and its bland and very slightly bitter taste. The poet says that chickens roost over Elynour's fermentation tank and drop their excrement into the froth. The yeast will sometimes form a white cap on the fermenting beer. Alcoholic beverages are also often associated with sex and indeed will sometimes reduce the inhibitions of men and women. However, Elynour advises her female customers that the ale will make them more desirable to their husbands, in part because she has the chicken excrement in the ale. Ralph Vaughan Williams set extracts in his Five Tudor Portraits with other poems by Skelton.
