= William Corkine =

English composer

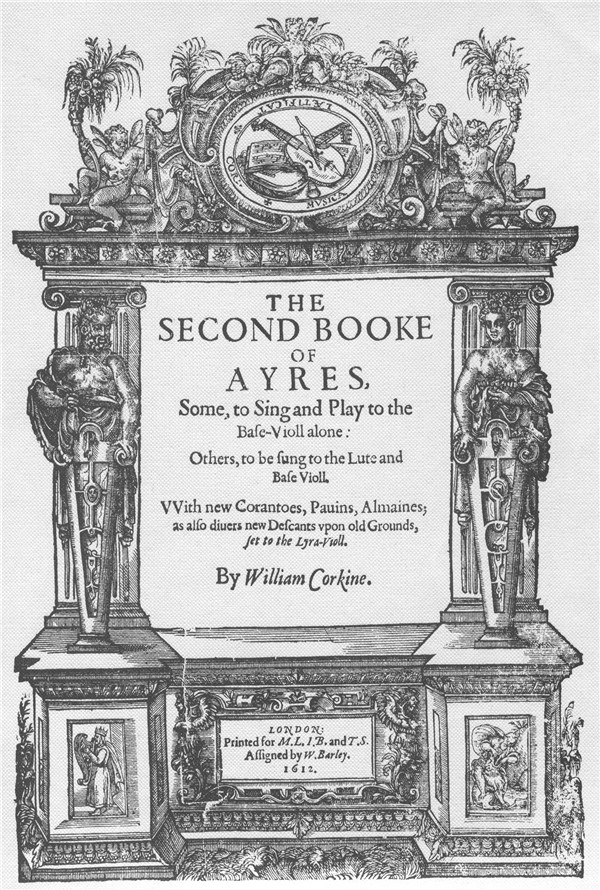
Second Booke of Ayres

William Corkine (fl. 1610 - 1617) was an English composer, lutenist, gambist and lyra viol player of the Renaissance.

In private service in the second decade of the 17th century before traveling to Poland in 1617. He published a first book of Ayres to Sing and Play to the Lute and Basse-Viollin in 1610 and a Second Booke of Ayres, some to sing and play to the Basse-Violl alone: others to be sung to the Lute and Bass Viollin in 1612. The second is notable in that thirteen of the songs are without tablature accompaniment or alternative partsong versions, but are instead marked to be sung 'to the Base-Violl alone.'

== Works, editions and recordings ==
- Fly swift my thoughts. We yet agree on Pastoral Dialogues Australian Eloquence 4802143
