= Arthur Francis Leach =

Arthur Francis Leach (16 March 1851 – 28 September 1915) was an English historian who wrote a number of books on the development of education in England. He has been called "the father of the history of education in England".

== Life ==
Leach was born in 1851, the son of Thomas Leach, barrister. He was educated from 1862 at Highgate School, then at Winchester College and won a scholarship to New College, Oxford, where he obtained a first in Classics. He won the Stanhope essay prize in 1872, and from 1874 to 1881 was a fellow of All Souls College, Oxford. He studied law, and became a barrister of the Middle Temple in 1876. In 1884, Leach became an assistant charity commissioner.

He was asked to investigate the histories of The Prebendal School, Chichester, and Southwell Grammar School. He found that, contrary to common belief, there had been many such schools in the medieval period that were independent of the monasteries, founded long before the independent schools of the Renaissance and Reformation such as Winchester, Eton College and Warwick School. The exploration of this subject became his life study, and he published many books on his findings while continuing to work at the Charity Commission, where he rose to a senior position before his death in 1915.

== Work ==
Leach's main theses were that English schools had greater antiquity than had been thought, and that the Tudors had not been the major patrons of English education. Between 1894 and 1915 he published nine books on the history of education, based on material from the British Museum, the Public Record Office and local archives; his approach laid the foundation for modern research into the subject. He was, however, sometimes slapdash with dates, opinionated and inclined to ignore aspects that did not interest him, which undermined his reputation. He downplayed the contributions of monastic schools, overestimated the role of chantry schools and failed to explore the curricula of the non-monastic schools.

Leach had an eye for beauty. Several of his works related to Beverley Minster in Yorkshire, of which he said there is no more beautiful building in England. He said it "dominates the landscape with an impressiveness of grandeur that the mother-church of York cannot surpass".

His main focus was on schools of the 16th century or earlier. He did publish an article on 18th century schools in the Encyclopædia Britannica, but it was dismissive. He said "Never probably since the 9th century was the condition of the public schools of England worse than in the years 1750 to 1840." He thought that the fundamental goal of a school in meeting its obligations as a charitable trust was to teach Latin and Greek, and was strongly opposed to non-classical teaching.

Leach pointed out that the history of education differs from the history of opinions about what education should be, and is more than a collection of biographies of prominent teachers. A modern scholar has said that his The Schools of Medieval England published in 1915, the year of his death, "formed the basis for all subsequent work on medieval and Reformation schooling until the publication of Nicholas Orme.s English Schools in the Middle Ages in 1973". However, the same scholar goes on to say that his claims "were not always sufficiently supported by his sources".

== Bibliography ==
- Arthur Francis Leach (1872). The protectorate: the Stanhope prize essay read in the theatre, Oxford, June 12, 1872. Rivingtons.
- Arthur Francis Leach (1878). Digest of the law relating to probate duty: with the new scale of duties. W. Maxwell & Son.
- Arthur Francis Leach (1879). Club cases: being considerations on the formation management, and dissolution of clubs, with especial reference to the liabilities and expulsion of members. Harrison.
- Arthur Francis Leach (1883). The English land question.
- Arthur Francis Leach (1893). Wykeham's Models.
- Arthur Francis Leach (1894). School of the Cathedral Church of St. Peter of York, or St. Peter's School, York: Report of assistant-commissioner. Spottiswoode for Charity Commission of Great Britain.
- Arthur Francis Leach (1895). A clerical strike at Beverley Minster in the fourteenth century. Nichols and Sons.
- Arthur Francis Leach (1896). English schools at the Reformation, 1546-8. A. Constable.
- Arthur Francis Leach (1898). Memorials of Beverley minster: the chapter act book of the collegiate church of S. John of Beverley, A. D. 1286–1347, with illustrative documents and introduction, Volume 98. Andrews & co.
- Arthur Francis Leach (1898). The Chapter Act Book of the Collegiate Church of S. John of Beverley A.D. 1286–1347 with ill. documents and introd. by Arthur Francis Leach. Surtees Society).
- Arthur Francis Leach (1899). Early Yorkshire schools, Volume 1. Printed for the Society.
- Arthur Francis Leach (1899). York. Beverley. Ripon.
- Arthur Francis Leach (1899). A History of Winchester College. ISBN 1-177-79427-6.
- Arthur Francis Leach (1903). Pontefract. Howden. Northallerton. Acaster. Rotherham. Giggleswick. Sedbergh.
- Arthur Francis Leach (1906). Stamford University. Archibald Constable and Co.
- Arthur Francis Leach (1915). Some results of research in the history of education in England with suggestions for its continuance and extension. H. Milford.
- Arthur Francis Leach (1915). Schools of Medieval England.
- Southwell Cathedral, Arthur Francis Leach (30 August 2010). Visitations and Memorials of Southwell Minster. BiblioBazaar. ISBN 978-1-178-00970-5.
- Arthur Francis Leach. Educational charters and documents 598 to 1909. The University press.
- Arthur Francis Leach (March 2010). Beverley Town Documents. General Books LLC. ISBN 978-1-154-63717-5.
- Arthur Francis Leach (February 2010). A History of Warwick School with Notices of the Collegiate Church, Gilds, and Borough of Warwick. BiblioBazaar. ISBN 978-1-145-84490-2.
- Arthur Francis Leach (1977). Milton as schoolboy and schoolmaster. ISBN 0-8482-1557-5.
- Arthur Francis Leach. A History of Bradfield College. ISBN 1-177-76764-3.
- Arthur Francis Leach (January 2010). Documents Illustrating Early Education in Worcester 685 To 1700. General Books LLC. ISBN 978-1-152-88730-5.
- Arthur Francis Leach. The Schools of Medieval England. ISBN 1-176-96647-2.
- Arthur Francis Leach (March 2010). Report on the Manuscripts of the Corporation of Beverley. Great Britain. Royal Commission on History, Beverley. ISBN 978-1-147-37166-6.

== Sources ==
- Adamson, John William (1919). "Preface". A Short History of Education. London: Cambridge University Press.
- Clancey, Richard W. (2000). Wordsworth's classical undersong: education, rhetoric and poetic truth. Palgrave Macmillan. ISBN 0-312-22560-1.
- Incorporated Council of Law Reporting for England and Wales (1876). The Weekly notes, Volume 11. W. Clowes and Sons. p. 495.
- Hesperides (2007). The Annual Register – A Review of Public Events at Home and Abroad for the Year 1915. READ BOOKS. ISBN 978-1-4067-5197-0.
- Kieckhefer, Richard (2004). Theology in stone: Church architecture from Byzantium to Berkeley. Oxford University Press US. ISBN 0-19-515466-5.
- Orme, Nicholas (2006). Medieval schools: from Roman Britain to Renaissance England. Yale University Press. ISBN 0-300-11102-9.
- Hamilton, David (2001). "Notes from Nowhere". In Popkewitz, Thomas S.; Franklin, Barry M.; Pereyra, Miguel A. (eds.). Cultural history and education: critical essays on knowledge and schooling. Routledge. ISBN 0-415-92806-0.
- Tompson, Richard S. (1971). Classics or charity?: the dilemma of the 18th century grammar school. Manchester University Press. ISBN 0-7190-0468-3.
- Tate, William (1963). A. F. Leach as a Historian of Yorkshire Education. York: St Anthony's Press.
