= Distichs of Cato =

Latin collection of proverbs

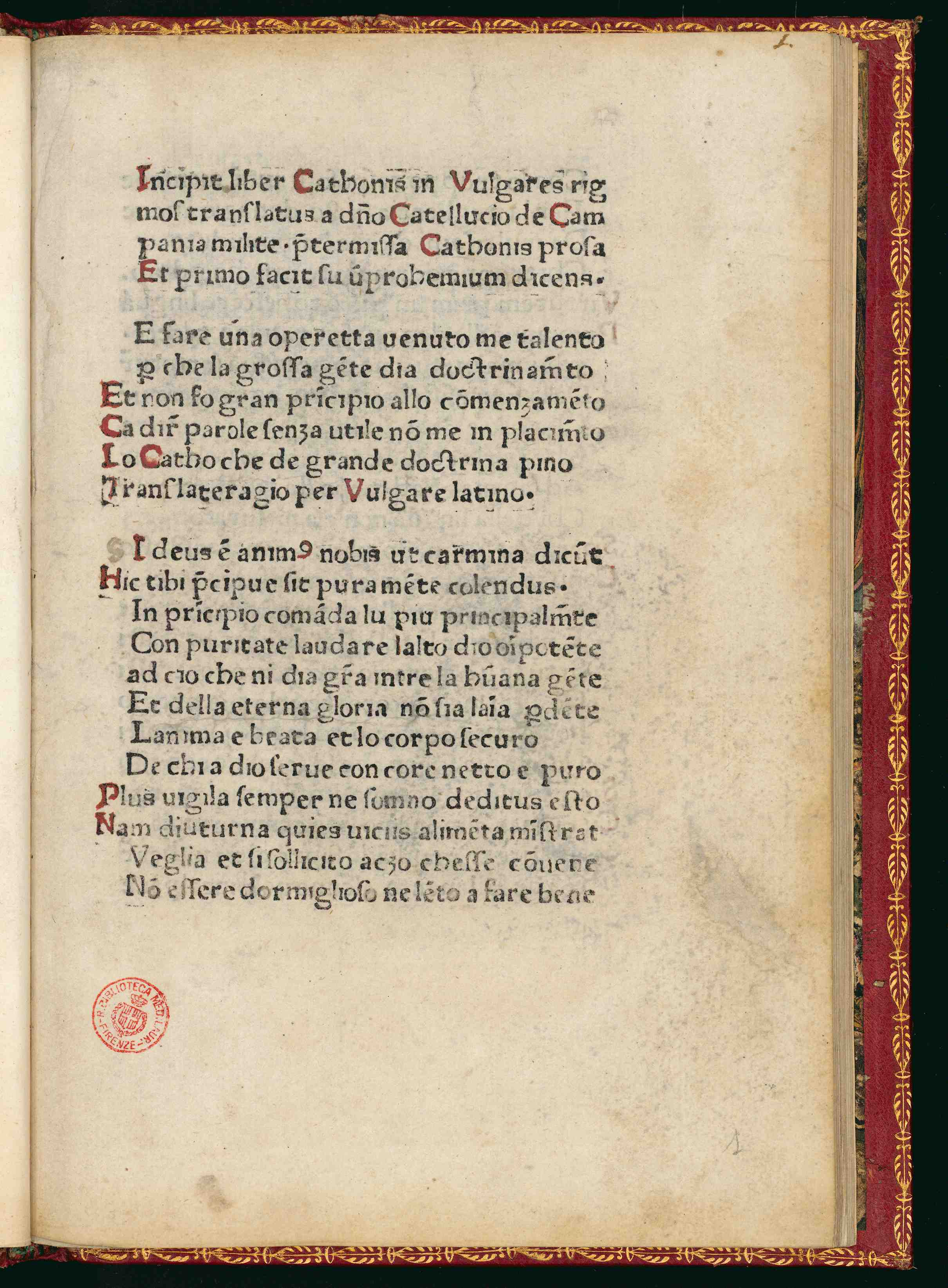
The beginning of a 1475 edition of the Distichs of Cato (Incipit liber Cathonis in vulgares)

The Distichs of Cato (Latin: Catonis Disticha, most famously known simply as Cato) is a Latin collection of proverbial wisdom and morality by an unknown author from the 3rd or 4th century AD. The Cato was the most popular medieval schoolbook for teaching Latin, prized not only as a Latin textbook, but as a moral compass. Cato was in common use as a Latin teaching aid in the 18th century when it was used by Benjamin Franklin. It was one of the best-known books in the Middle Ages and was translated into many languages. It was still used in schools in parts of Britain in the 19th century.

== Background ==
Along with the grammar books Ars Minor by Aelius Donatus and Institutiones Grammaticae by Priscian, Cato was the most popular Latin textbook during the Middle Ages, prized not only as a Latin textbook, but as a moral compass for impressionable students. It was translated into many languages, including Norse.

He knew nat Catoun, for his wit was rude.

— Canterbury Tales

Geoffrey Chaucer referred to Cato in Canterbury Tales, through which modern students, less versed in Latin, often first come upon it.

The Distichs of Cato was most commonly referred to as simply "Cato". In the Middle Ages it was assumed the work had been written by Cato the Elder, or even Cato the Younger. Cato the Elder was assumed to have included tracts of the prose in his Carmen de Moribus, but this was found to be a later addition. It was eventually attributed to the anonymous author Dionysius Cato (also known as Catunculus) from the 3rd or 4th century AD, based upon evidence in a manuscript discussed by Julius Caesar Scaliger (1484–1558). This manuscript no longer exists, though Scaliger found it authoritative.

In 1513 Erasmus corrected and commented on the text in a new edition of his own.

Corderius made the French translation, enriching it with commentaries on classical authors. His work was aimed at children with a summary, verses and an analysis of the structure. It was actually a grammatical treatise.

There were several Spanish translations of the work of Corderius. From the first one in 1490 down to 1964, there are records of 6 Spanish translations. An authority on Michael Servetus, González Echeverría, presented at the ISHM the thesis that Servetus was actually the author of the anonymous Spanish translation of 1543 of this work of Corderius.

There were several English translations, one being that of John Kingston in 1584.

Benjamin Franklin probably studied Cato when he was at Boston Latin School. He cites Cato in Poor Richard's Almanack and believed in the moral advice with such fervor he was troubled to print James Logan's translation called Cato's Moral Distichs Englished in Couplets in 1735, the first in the Colonies. Of its limited need in the morally puritan New England colonies, Franklin says:

"It would be thought a Piece of Hypocrisy and pharisaical Ostentation in me, if I should say, that I print these Distichs more with a view to the Good of others than my own private Advantage: And indeed I cannot say it; for I confess, I have so great Confidence in the common Virtue and Good Sense of the People of this and the neighboring Provinces, that I expect to sell a very good impression."

== Cato ==
Libros lege (Read books)
—Cato, Monostichs.

"Distich" means closed couplets, a style of writing with two-liners. It is a collection of moral advice, each consisting of hexameters, in four books. Cato is not particularly Christian in character, but it is monotheistic.

=== Sample distichs ===
2.1. If you can, even remember to help people you don't know.
More precious than a kingdom it is to gain friends by kindness.

2.9. Do not disdain the powers of a small body;
He may be strong in counsel (though) nature denies him strength.

3.2. If you live rightly, do not worry about the words of bad people,
It is not our call as to what each person says.

== See also ==
- The Durham Proverbs
- Medieval literature
- Publilius Syrus

== Sources ==
- Cato translation. Scanned and translated by James Marchand from Leopold Zatocil, Cato a Facetus, Opera Universitatis Masarykianae Brunensis, Facultas Philosophica. Cislo 48 (Brno, 1952), 229–237. Reedited and marked up by Martin Irvine. This is a more modern, and perhaps understandable, translation; it is of unknown copyright status, and thus not included in Wikisource.
- Hazelton, Richard (1960). "Chaucer and Cato". Speculum. 35 (3): 357–380. doi:10.2307/2849730. ISSN 0038-7134. JSTOR 2849730. S2CID 162410982.
- The Distichs of Cato at The Latin Library (in Latin)
- Disticha Catonis. Recensuit et apparatu critico instruxit Marcus Boas. Opus post Marci Boas mortem edendum curavit Henricus Johannes Botschuyver (Amsterdam, 1952). This is the best critical edition of the Disticha Catonis available today.
