= Richard Hathwaye =

16th/17th-century English playwright

- Died: 22 April 1604; St. Botolph Aldgate, London, England
- Occupations: Playwright, poet
- Children: John Hathway
- Writing career
- Literary movement: English Renaissance theatre

Richard Hathwaye (fl. 1597–1603), was an English dramatist.

== Life ==
Little is known about Hathwaye's life. There is no evidence that he was related to his namesake Richard Hathaway, the father of Shakespeare's wife, Anne Hathaway, though Richard's theatrical troupe "the Admiral's Men" was sponsored by Admiral Charles Howard, the son in law of Sir Henry Carey, Lord Chamberlain of England, the sponsor of William Shakespeare's theatrical troupe the Lord Chamberlain's Men. Hathwaye is not heard of after 1603 and died in 1604 and is buried at St Botolph's Aldgate, London.

== Career as a dramatist ==
Information on Hathwaye's dramatic career is derived mostly from the papers of Philip Henslowe. He wrote eighteen plays for Henslowe for production by the Admiral's Men and Worcester's Men at the Rose Theater, both as sole author and in partnership with other playwrights who also produced copy for Henslowe. The first of these, King Arthur (1597), is the only play for which he received sole credit. He had likely already been writing for the stage for some time, however, since Francis Meres refers to him as if he was a veteran dramatist in 1598, including him among those "best for comedy."

Hathwaye also wrote commendatory verses for John Bodenham's Belvedere, published in 1600.

Aside from his Belvedere verses all of Hathwaye's works are lost except for the first part of the collaborative Sir John Oldcastle, commissioned as a counterblast to the negative depiction of the title character in the original versions of William Shakespeare's plays Henry IV (Part 1) and Henry IV (Part 2). Objections from descendants of the historical John Oldcastle, a Protestant martyr, appears to have been responsible both for the writing of the corrective Oldcastle play and the alteration of Oldcastle to Sir John Falstaff in later versions of the Henry IV plays.

== Known works ==
Known plays by Hathwaye, either singly or in conjunction with others, include:

For the Admiral's Men, 1598-1602:

1. King Arthur, April 1598. 1597. Not printed.
2. Valentine and Orson, with Anthony Munday, July 1598. Not printed.
3. Sir John Oldcastle, Part I, with Michael Drayton, Anthony Munday and Robert Wilson, October–December 1599. Editions published in 1600 and 1619.
4. Sir John Oldcastle, Part II, with Michael Drayton, Anthony Munday and Robert Wilson, October–December 1599. Not printed.
5. Owen Tudor, with Michael Drayton, Anthony Munday, and Robert Wilson, January 1600. Not printed; possibly not finished.
6. Fair Constance of Rome, Part I, with Thomas Dekker, Michael Drayton, Anthony Munday, and Robert Wilson, June 1600. Not printed.
7. Fair Constance of Rome, Part II, with Thomas Dekker, Michael Drayton, Anthony Munday, and Robert Wilson, June 1600. Not printed; possibly not finished.
8. Hannibal and Scipio, with William Rankins, January 1601. Not printed.
9. Scogan and Skelton, with William Rankins, January–March 1601. Not printed.
10. The Conquest of Spain by John of Gaunt, with William Rankins, March–April 1601. Never finished, at least for Henslowe, as the manuscript was returned to Hathwaye.
11. The Six Clothiers, Part I, with William Haughton and Wentworth Smith, October–November 1601. Not printed.
12. The Six Clothiers, Part II, with William Haughton and Wentworth Smith, October–November 1601. Not printed; possibly not finished.
13. Too Good to be True, with Henry Chettle and Wentworth Smith, November 1601-January 1602. Not printed.
14. Merry as May Be, with John Day and Wentworth Smith, November 1602. Not printed.

For Worcester's Men, 1602-1603:

1. The Black Dog of Newgate, Part I, with John Day, Wentworth Smith, and an anonymous "other poet," November 1602-February 1603. Not printed.
2. The Black Dog of Newgate, Part II, with John Day, Wentworth Smith, and an anonymous "other poet," November 1602-February 1603.
3. The Unfortunate General, with John Day, Wentworth Smith, and a third author, January 1603. Not printed.

For the Admiral's Men, 1603:

1. The Boss of Billingsgate, with John Day and one or more others, March 1603. Not printed.
