= William Smith (poet) =

English sonneteer, poet and friend of Edmund Spenser

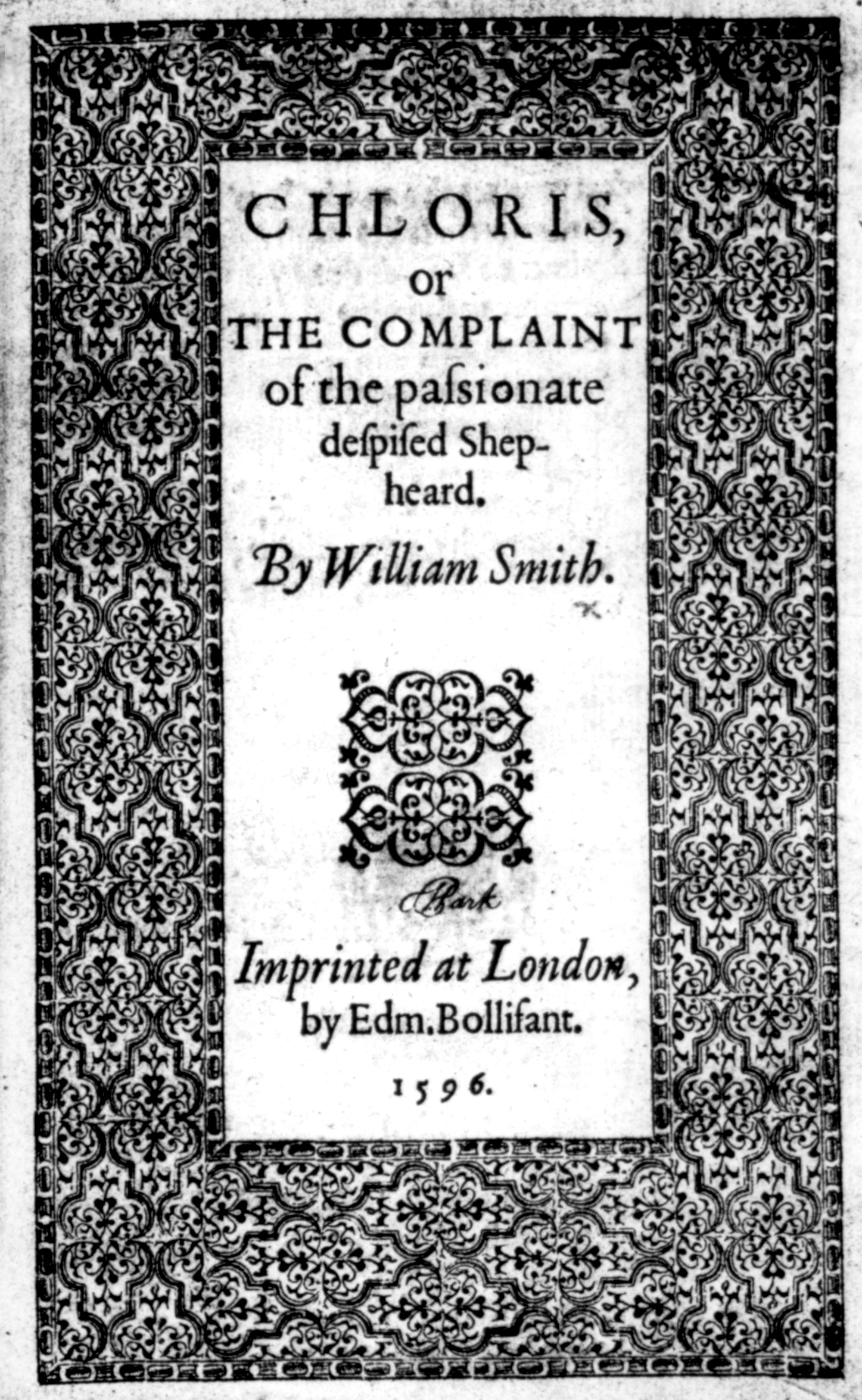
Title page of the first edition of Chloris, published in 1596 (British Library)

William Smith (15??-16??) was an English poet who published a sonnet sequence entitled Chloris in 1596. Nothing is known about his life except that he moved in the circles of Edmund Spenser, whom he considered a mentor and to whom he dedicated Chloris, and Sir Philip Sidney, to whose sister he dedicated at least one and possibly two poems preserved only in manuscripts.

== Works ==
Smith's sonnet sequence, Chloris, or the Complaint of the Passionate Despised Shepheard, was published in 1596 by the London printer Edmund Bollifant. The collection consists of 53 poems, most but not all of them sonnets, combining the Petrarchan convention of unhappy love with a pastoral setting inspired by Spenser's Shepheardes Calender. The first and last poems in the collection are addressed to "Colin Cloute", i.e. Spenser, whom Smith describes as "the patron of my maiden verse". One of the poems from Chloris was included in the Elizabethan poetic miscellany, England's Helicon, first published in 1600, but otherwise the collection seems to have attracted little attention, and it was not reprinted until the 19th century.

A manuscript now in the British Library (MS Additional 35186) contains another collection of short verse by Smith, originally presented to Mary Herbert, Countess of Pembroke and sister of Sir Philip Sidney. Entitled A Newyeares Guifte Made upon Certen Flowers, it consists of a dedication to the Countess followed by seven short poems, most of them sixains rhyming ABACC, each devoted to a different flower. The manuscript is written in "a beautiful italic hand" and assumed to be an autograph by Smith himself.

A third poem by Smith is preserved in a manuscript in the library of Yale University. It is another presentation copy, written in the same hand as the British Library manuscript and signed "your Ladyshippes devoted servante as a stranger William Smythe". The name of the addressee is unknown, but it was perhaps again the Countess of Pembroke. The poem is an allegory in which Time explains his attributes and introduces his legitimate family (Opportunity, Patience, Experience) and his bastard children (Excuse, Protraction, and Deceit).

== Attributions ==
Poems printed in other Elizabethan publications and identified only by the author's initials "W. S." have sometimes been attributed to Smith. Examples include commendatory verses in John Grange's Golden Aphroditis (1577) and Nicholas Breton's The Will of Wit, Wit's Will, or Will's Wit, Chuse You Whether (1597). The lyric "My thoughts are wingde with hopes, my hopes with love", first printed in John Dowland's First Book of Songes or Ayres (1597) and reprinted in Englands Helicon, has been variously attributed to Smith, George Clifford (Earl of Cumberland), Fulke Greville, John Lyly, and Sir Walter Raleigh. In the absence of evidence to support the identifications, all of these attributions are speculative. A poem entitled "A Notable Description of the World" and printed in The Phoenix Nest, a miscellany published in 1593, shares some characteristics with the allegory of Time in the Yale manuscript, and may have a slightly stronger claim to be Smith's work.

Several plays signed "W. Smith" and occasionally in the past attributed to William Smith are now usually assumed to have been written by the playwright Wentworth Smith.

== Modern editions ==
- A. B. Grosart, ed., Chloris by William Smith (1596) (Manchester 1877). A privately printed edition limited to 50 copies.
- E. Arber, ed., An English Garner, vol. VIII (London 1896), pp. 171–199. Reprints Chloris (but omits sonnet 47).
- M. F. Crowe, ed., Elizabethan Sonnet-Cycles: Idea by Michael Drayton, Fidessa by Bartholomew Griffin, Chloris by William Smith (London 1897). Reprints Chloris (complete).
- S. Lee, ed., Elizabethan Sonnets (London 1904), vol. II, pp. 321–349. Reproduced from Arber's edition; reprints Chloris (but omits sonnet 47).
- L. A. Sasek, ed., The Poems of William Smith (Baton Rouge 1970). Reprints Chloris (complete) together with A Newyeares Guifte Made upon Certen Flowers from the British Library MS.
- K. T. Van den Berg, "An Elizabethan Allegory of Time by William Smith", English Literary Renaissance 6.1 (1976), pp. 40–59. Reprints An Allegory of Time from the Yale MS.
