= John Bodenham =

English anthologist

- Born: c. 1559
- Died: c. 1610 (aged c. 50)
- Occupation: anthologist
- Years active: c. 1600

John Bodenham (c. 1559–1610), an English anthologist, was the patron of some of the Elizabethan poetry anthologies.

== Life ==
Bodenham was the eldest of the five children of William Bodnam, a London grocer, and Katherine Wanton of York. He was educated at Merchant Taylors' School.

According to Arthur Henry Bullen in the Dictionary of National Biography, Bodenham did not himself edit any of the Elizabethan miscellanies attributed to him by bibliographers. He simply projected the publication of them and befriended their editors.

== Works ==
- Politeuphuia (Wits' Commonwealth) (1597)
- Wits' Theater (1598)
- Belvidere, or the Garden of the Muses (1600)
- England's Helicon (1600). This "prints for the first time [Christopher] Marlowe's 'The Passionate Shepherd to his Love', with [Sir Walter] Ralegh's reply."
