= William Rankins =

16th-century English pamphleteer and playwright

William Rankins (fl. 1587) was an English writer. He was classed by Francis Meres in his Palladis Tamia (1598) as one of the three leading contemporary satirists, with Joseph Hall and John Marston.

== Life ==
Baptised 1565, Rankins was the elder son of Henry Rankyn, master of the Barber–Surgeons' Company in 1587, and Mary Robynson. His father's will of 1597 favoured his younger brother, Henry.

Rankins is regarded as a professional writer. Indeed, while his anti-theatrical Mirrour of 1587 apparently allied him with Puritan criticisms, he was involved in some fashion with the theatre beforehand and afterwards. It has been suggested that he was insincere, and that, as a hack writer, he was paid for the pamphlet by the City of London corporation.

Rankins died in 1609.

== Works ==
Rankins wrote:

- Mirrour of Monsters, wherein is plainly described the manifold vices and spotted enormities that are caused by the infectious sight of Playes, London, 1587, a savage attack on the theatre, in the manner of Stephen Gosson, John Northbrooke and Philip Stubbes. Like also John Field, John Norden and George Whetstone, he argued against Sunday performance. It may have been a literary exercise in an established genre; in any case within a few years Rankins was a playwright. The work is allegorical, with main conceit a demonic parody of a wedding masque.
- Mulmutius Dunwallow, a play bought by Philip Henslowe in 1598, likely an adaptation; the subject was Dyfnwal Moelmud, and possible sources the Historia Regum Britanniae and Holinshed's Chronicles.
- Hannibal and Scipio, play written for Henslowe with Richard Hathway, and based on Livy; the same team produced c.1600 a comic play, and The Conquest of Spain by John of Gaunt. None of these plays are extant.
- Works dedicated to Sir Christopher Hatton, The English Ape, the Italian imitation, the Foote-steppes of Fraunce. Wherein is explained the wilfull blindnesse of subtill mischiefe, the striuing for Starres, the catching of Mooneshine, and the Secrete Sounde of many hollowe heartes (1588), against the imitation of foreign fashions, and My Roughcast Conceit of Hell.
- Dedicated to John Salisbury of Lleweni, Seaven Satyres applyed to the weeke, including the worlds ridiculous follyes. True felicity described in the Phœnix. Maulgre. Whereunto is annexed the wandring Satyre (1598), publisher Edward Allde. True felicity described in the Phœnix, a religious poem, is with seven satires, in seven-line stanzas.

Before the Belvedere (1600) by John Bodenham are three seven-line stanzas, "A Sonnet to the Muse's Garden" by Rankins; who also contributed anonymously to the anthology Plato's Cap of 1604.

== Notes ==
Attribution

This article incorporates text from a publication now in the public domain: Lee, Sidney, ed. (1894). "William Rankins". Dictionary of National Biography. Vol. 38. London: Smith, Elder & Co.
