= John Stanbridge =

English academic

John Stanbridge (1463–1510) was an English grammarian and schoolmaster.

He was born in Heyford, Northamptonshire and educated at Winchester College. In 1480 he went to New College, Oxford and stayed until 1486, when he joined the staff of the newly founded Magdalen College School, founded by William Waynflete. Stanbridge became headmaster in 1488, following the death of John Anwykyll.

He is best remembered for the series of educational books which he wrote and edited:

- Accidence (c.1505)
- Parvulorum institutio (c.1507)
- Gradus comparationum together with Sum es fui (c.1509)
- Vulgaria (c.1509)
- Vocabula (1510)

These works were important as they were among the first in England to incorporate humanist educational principles and standards of Latin with the older style of teaching materials.
