= The Noble Spanish Soldier =

1622 play by Thomas Dekker

- Original language: English
- Written by: Thomas Dekker
- Characters: King of Spain; Cardinal; Count Malateste of Florence; Roderigo; Valasco; Lopez; Duke of Medina; Marquis Daenia; Alba; Carlon; Alanzo; Sebastian; Balthazar; Cornego; Cockadillio; Signor No; A Poet; Queen of Spain; Onaelia; Juanna
- Genre: Comedy
- Setting: 16th century Spain

Premiere
- Date: c. 1622
- Place: England

The Noble Spanish Soldier (1622) is a Jacobean play written by English author Thomas Dekker.

== Dramatic characters ==
- King of Spain
- Cardinal, advisor to the King
- Count Malateste of Florence, confidant of the Queen
- Roderigo, Don of Spain, supporter of the King
- Valasco, Don of Spain, supporter of the King
- Lopez, Don of Spain, supporter of the King
- Duke of Medina, leader of the Faction
- Marquis Daenia, member of the Faction
- Alba, Don of Spain, member of the Faction
- Carlo, Don of Spain, member of the Faction
- Alanzo, Captain of the Guard, member of the Faction
- Sebastian, illegitimate son of the King
- Balthazar, a Spanish soldier
- Cornego, servant to Onaelia
- Cockadillio, a courtier
- Signor No
- A Poet
- Queen of Spain, Paulina, daughter of Duke of Florence
- Onaelia, niece to the Duke of Medina, mother of Sebastian
- Juanna, maid to Onaelia
- Ladies in waiting
- Attendants, guards

== Plot ==
After enjoying the favours of Onaelia, niece to the duke of Medina, the Spanish king repudiates her and her son, Sebastian, making Paulina, daughter of the duke of Florence, his queen. On hearing this, the noble soldier Balthazar works on the conscience of the king to take back Onaelia. Despite the threat of civil war, the king refuses. Count Malatesta proposes to the queen that she pretend to be pregnant, to sound the hearts of the Spanish people. Roderigo, Lopez, and Valasco, dons of Spain, rally to the cause of their majesties against the duke of Medina's faction. Angered at her rival, the queen proposes to Balthazar the murder of Onaelia and her son, to which he pretends to acquiesce after receiving the king's command. But, loyal to Onaelia, Balthazar announces these plots to Medina, who disguises himself as a French doctor to gain access to the king.

When the disguised Medina speaks to the king, he becomes convinced of the legitimacy of the king's plot to murder his niece as well as Balthazar's loyalty. To appease the rebellious faction, the king proposes a marriage between Onaelia and Cockadillio, a courtier, an offer which is accepted. The queen and Malateste again confer, deciding to poison Onaelia. During the marriage ceremony, the king takes up the poisoned cup meant for Onaelia, to the queen's and Malateste's consternation. While the king is drinking, Malateste admits their crime and is stabbed to death by the faction. While dying, the king passes the crown to Sebastian and commands that the queen be sent back to Florence with treble dowry. Onaelia and Balthazar are appointed to protect Sebastian in his youth.

== Sources, Authorship and Date ==
The first clear reference to the play is dated as 16 May 1631 when an entry was made in the Stationer's Register, effectively licensing texts for publication. The entry, made for John Jackman, referred to manuscripts of two plays by ‘Tho: Dekker’, these being ‘The Wonder of a Kingdom’ and ‘a Tragedy called The Noble Spanish Soldier’. A similar entry was made on 9 December 1633, this time for Nicholas Vavasour. The play was printed in a quarto version in 1634, probably by John Beale, on behalf of Vavasour, who initialled the foreword entitled ‘The Printer to The Reader’.

These aspects of the play have attracted more critical attention than all others combined, reference frequently being made to the following known facts:

(1) Although the entries in the Stationer’s Register refer unambiguously to Dekker as the author, the title page of the Quarto states that the play is written by ‘S.R.’, the only Jacobean playwright with those initials being Samuel Rowley.

(2) It has been observed, initially by nineteenth century scholar A. H. Bullen, that three sections of a play by John Day called 'The Parliament of Bees’ are nearly identical to sections of NSS. Furthermore, a further five sections correspond closely to parts of 'The Wonder of a Kingdom’ which as is noted above, was registered alongside NSS in 1931.

(3) In 1601, theatre manager Philip Henslowe made part payment for an anonymous play called 'The Spanish Fig', no text of which survives under that name.

(4) In April 1624 a poster appeared in Norwich advertising a touring play, being 'An excellent Comedy called 'The Spanish Contract’ to be performed by Lady Elizabeth's men, a company with which Dekker is believed to have had connections.

(5) There is some evidence of confusion in how the play has been compiled for printing, in particular, a cast list which omits several significant characters, the late appearance of two pointless characters (Signor No and Juanna) and the delayed identification of Alanzo as Captain of the Guard. These have been argued to be evidence of revision of an earlier work.

(6) Dekker's 'The Welsh Embassador’ reworked much of the material in NSS, albeit in a comedic form. This is generally dated as c1623.

As may be imagined, these facts offer a considerable range of possibilities as to authorship and provenance of the play. Various critics, such as Fleay and Bullen, have tried to make sense of all of them by postulating, largely without evidence, a variety of permutations of collaboration and revision so as to give all of the authorship candidates a role in the production of the text we now have. The most persuasive contribution however, comes from Julia Gasper who, building on work by R. Koeppel, convincingly identifies the source of NSS as being Volume V of Jacques-Augueste de Thou's Latin 'Historiarum Sui Temporis', published in 1620.

The de Thou volume tells of how Henry IV of France reneged on a written promise of marriage to Henriette d’Entragues, by marrying Marie de' Medici in 1600; both women bore sons by the King, who is later assassinated. This closely anticipates the marriage plot of NSS but the critical detail which seals the identification of de Thou as the source, is his reference to a soldier called Balthazare Sunica who acted against the King and was clearly, the original of the character Balthazar in NSS. This evidence demonstrates that the earliest date for composition of NSS is 1620. Furthermore, due to the likelihood that NSS predated 'The Welsh Embassador’ of 1623/4, a last possible date for the writing of NSS can also be deduced and a composition date of around 1622 can be established with some certainty.

With respect to the relationship with other plays, any connection with 'The Spanish Fig’ would seem to be ruled out on the grounds that it pre-dates the publication of de Thou's Historiarum. In the case of the later play 'The Spanish Contract', a connection is possible although any theories that may be advanced little more than conjecture. One such theory, put forward by Tirthanker Bose, is that 'the Spanish Contract’ is a version of NSS, reworked as a comedy and thus is an intermediate stage on the road to 'The Welsh Embassador'.

The more pressing matter, the question of the connection with 'The Parliament of Bees', is also addressed by Julia Gasper. The crucial evidence here relates to instances where details, meaningful only in the context of NSS, have become embedded in the text of 'The Parliament of Bees'. The most significant example of this occurs in Scene 1, Line 29 of 'The Parliament of Bees’ where a character asks 'Is Master Bee at leisure to speak Spanish / With a Bee of Service?’. There is no connection between 'The Parliament of Bees’ and Spain or indeed, the Spanish language, so it would seem strong evidence that NSS was the source for 'The Parliament of Bees’ and not the other way around. This evidence is supplemented by an analysis of NSS, Act 2 Scene 1, a scene common to both plays, when Balthazar sets out his credentials of loyal service in seeking to advise the King. Gasper points out that this scene in NSS contains elements from de Thou, not to be found in The Parliament of Bees, principally the need to intervene on behalf of Onaelia. The only plausible order of composition for the plays therefore places NSS before 'The Parliament of Bees'. Furthermore, as Day's name has never been associated with NSS, there is no reason to suppose he was involved in its composition. The likelihood is therefore that he was lifting dialogue from an earlier work by another writer to serve his own convenience.

The remaining question to be considered concerns the relative claims to authorship of Dekker and Rowley. In weighing the evidence, it is important to consider that the first records, those on the Stationer's Register, unequivocally record Dekker as the sole author. Furthermore, textual scholarship is happy to place NSS within the Dekker cannon, while, as Hoy says 'no scholar has ever succeeded in demonstrating Rowley's share in the play’. Given that it has been established that the play post-dates 1620, the possibility of a Dekker revision of an earlier Rowley text would appear to be implausible. The attribution to ‘S.R.’ remains unexplained, although it may be noted in passing that the initials are the final letters of Dekker's names, so it may just be a coded reference to Dekker. More likely perhaps, it could be the result of the editorial confusion which led to the title page being headed 'The Noble Soldier' and also pervades the compilation of the cast list.

== Commentary ==
The sub-title given to the text in the Quarto edition is 'A contract Broken, Justly Revenged'. Although this title is likely to have been added by the printers, it does succinctly sum up one aspect the play, the theme of revenge which is reminiscent of Elizabethan revenge plays such as Thomas Kyd's 'The Spanish Tragedy'. Revenge plays however, are generally patterned around a revenger and what may be termed a ‘revengee’, while the action of NSS revolves around a power struggle between two factions both of whom are concerned with violent intent. In reality, the play reflects the seventeenth century fashion for mixing elements of tragedy and comedy in a style first identified by Sir Philip Sydney in 1579 as being 'mongrel tragicomedy’; thus while death intrudes on the final act, it only strikes unsympathetic characters. There is also regular light relief provided by two comic characters, Cornego and Cockadillio, as well the cameo appearances of Signor No and Medina as a French Doctor.

The two groups of characters at the centre of the play are on one hand, the ruling cabal, that is the King, his Italian Queen and their supporters, including the Italian Malateste, and on the other a number of disenchanted Spanish noblemen who are in sympathy with the King's former betrothed lover, Onaelia. This later faction, led by the Duke of Medina, eventually includes the key figure of the patriotic soldier Balthazar, a man who has earned respect for his martial exploits and whose ‘nobility’, as celebrated in the title to the play, is a tribute earned by action rather than by birth or inheritance. He is thus differentiated from the King, whose nobility of birth is cancelled out by the dishonesty of his character.

Nevertheless, Balthazar is something of a problematic figure and in many ways an unconvincing hero for a play with ostensibly, a strong moral theme. His basic character is presented as that of an honest uncomplicated soldier; in his first appearance(2.1), he has already been slighted by the Dons, and presents an unkempt appearance and rails against the ‘pied-winged butterflies’ of the effete court who put appearance before patriotic duty. Nevertheless, subterfuge seems to come too readily to him as we see in 2.2 when he makes a false offer to assassinate the King to test Onaelia, again in 3.3 when he pretends to agree to murder Sebastian and Onaelia to placate the Queen and finally in 5.1 when he tells the King that the murder has been carried out. Scene 3.3 shows a further unedifying side of Balthazar when he bursts in on the King and stabs a servant and refuses to express remorse as the servant is a mere groom. On a different note, the character is also used to comic effect, especially in 4.2 when he acts out bawdy dialogue with Cornego. His last significant act is to dissuade the faction from attempting to assassinate the King, before being reduced to a minor role in the closing scene where he only has five short speeches and plays no significant part in the denouement. The character then, is something of a patchwork affair, playing different roles as the play progresses before being effectively jettisoned at the conclusion.

The King by contrast maintains a degree of consistency, notwithstanding his formulaic deathbed renunciation of evil. As we have seen, his Queen is Italian, but he may be associated with Italy by more reasons than his marriage. In Act 5 Scene 2, Daenia says that ‘There’s in his breast / Both fox and lion, and both those beasts can bite’ This is a direct reference to the works of the Italian courtier Niccolò Machiavelli who wrote in his work on statecraft 'The Prince’: 'A Prince must know how to make good use of the beasts; he should choose from among the beasts the fox and the lion; for the lion cannot defend itself from traps and the fox cannot protect itself from wolves.’. Although the book from which this extract was taken, 'The Prince', had yet to be published in English, the ideas it contained (or at least a caricature of them) had been in circulation for many years following its initial publication in Italy in 1531. These were often treated with profound suspicion by the English who saw the advocacy of the use of manipulation and deception to maintain power as being the idea of a disreputable foreign country. Indeed, Machiavelli was seen as a satanic figure who was known as 'Old Nick', a still-used reference to the devil, and the machiavel became a stock figure on the early modern stage, a tradition which the portrayal of the King is drawing on.

The other interesting opposition within the play is between the two claimants to the title of Queen, the current incumbent and Onaelia. There is little doubt that it is Onaelia who is the representative of virtue, her behaviour often rising above that of the ‘noble’ Balthazar. In Act 1 Scene 2 she makes a fearless statement in defacing the King's portrait, this being an act of treason. Despite her strong feelings however, she does not rise to Balthazar's bait when he introduces the possibility of assassinating the King; the remnants of her love for him and her concern for the stability of the realm rule this possibility out. She is not however prepared to accept her treatment without protest and, in Act 3 Scene 2, engages a poet to propagandise on her behalf. His refusal, on the grounds of self-preservation is denounced in striking terms when she accuses poets generally of being 'apt to lash / Almost to death poor wretches not worth striking / but fawn with slavish flattery on damned vices / so great men act them'. The effective conclusion of her involvement as early as the end of 3.2 impoverishes the rest of the play. The Queen's less admirable character is highlighted by the way she is prepared to condone the taking of life to secure her position. Her ruthless outlook is punished when she is deprived of her position and forced to return to Italy .

The final scene of the play utilises a dramatic technique that had played an important part in Dekker's most famous play, The Shoemaker's Holiday: the banquet scene. Planned by the King in an attempt to achieve reconciliation and remove the threat of Onaelia by marrying her off, it represents a means of bringing almost the entire cast on stage to witness the meting out of justice. It is ironic that the King's scheme is undermined, not by his political rivals but by his allies, The Queen and Malateste, who do not believe that the marriage will provide a stable settlement and instead seek to pursue a deadlier course of action. The banquet provides the context for the unwinding of this plot as vengeance consumes itself, bringing about the regime change that justice demands.

== Publications ==
- Dekker, T. – 'The Noble Spanish Soldier’ – Tudor facsimiles – 1913.
- Dekker, T. – 'The Noble Spanish Soldier’ BiblioLife (18 August 2008) ISBN 978-0-554-35603-7
- https://www.gutenberg.org/ebooks/16753
