= Lust's Dominion =

English Renaissance stage play

Lust's Dominion, or The Lascivious Queen is an English Renaissance stage play, a tragedy written perhaps around 1600, probably by Thomas Dekker in collaboration with others and first published in 1657.

The play has been categorized as a revenge tragedy, comparable to Kyd's The Spanish Tragedy, Shakespeare's Titus Andronicus and Hamlet, and to tragedies by Thomas Middleton (The Revenger's Tragedy), John Webster (The White Devil) and Cyril Tourneur (The Atheist's Tragedy).

== Authorship ==
The first edition attributed the authorship of the play to Christopher Marlowe, though this attribution has been recognized as spurious by critics and scholars for nearly two centuries. (The play borrows from a pamphlet, published in 1599, about the death of King Philip II of Spain in 1598. Marlowe died in 1593.)

The 1657 duodecimo edition was published by Francis Kirkman, to be sold by the bookseller Robert Pollard. Of the four surviving copies of the 1657 edition, three attribute the play to Marlowe on their title pages—but one does not. This fourth copy also includes three dedicatory poems prefacing the play.

Many critics who have studied the play judge the internal evidence to be suggestive of the style of Thomas Dekker. John Payne Collier was the first to identify Lust's Dominion with The Spanish Moor's Tragedy, a play that has not survived under its original name. Collier's argument has been accepted by a number of subsequent commentators. Philip Henslowe's Diary records a down-payment of £3 to Dekker, John Day, and William Haughton in February 1600 for The Spanish Moor's Tragedy; the Diary, however, does not show that that play was ever finished, and its identification with Lust's Dominion remains uncertain. Individual scholars have also discussed the hypothesis that Henry Chettle may have had a hand in the play, and a few have allowed a possibility that Marlowe may have had some connection with the text in an earlier form. John Marston has also been linked to the play as a potential part-author. However, Darren Freebury-Jones, Marina Tarlinskaja, and Marcus Dahl reject the part-attribution to Marston and ascribe the play to Dekker, Day, and Haughton.

== The plot ==
Moor Eleazar, Prince of Fez, the anti-hero protagonist, is a prisoner in the Spanish Court, but honored for his military victories. Eleazar has a strong grudge against the Spaniards over his father's death; and he is ruthless enough to make a bold attempt to seize the Spanish crown for himself. The Queen Mother of Spain, Eugenia, is in love with Eleazar; King Ferdinando loves the Moor's wife, Maria. Cardinal Mendoza, bishop of Salamanca, loves the Queen. All of these characters are consumed by ungovernable passions — except for the cold and Machiavellian Eleazar. The Moor pretends to love the Queen Mother, but manipulates her into murdering her son Philip; then he kills her as well. To strike at the Cardinal, he betrays his chaste young wife. And he stabs King Ferdinando as the culmination of his evil plans. Despite all of his stratagems, however, Eleazar is defeated in the end; he goes to his death unrepentant.

Eleazar's opponents dye their skin to approach him in the final act.

== Abd-el-Oahed ben Massood ==
If Lust's Dominion is The Spanish Moor's Tragedy by another name, it may have been influenced by the August 1600 arrival in London of Abd el-Ouahed ben Messaoud, Ambassador of Muley Ahmad al-Mansur, King of Barbary or Morocco. The embassy had the goal of building an Anglo-Moroccan alliance against Spain. The visit, which ended in February 1601, was inconclusive.

== Adaptations ==
In the Restoration era, Aphra Behn adapted the play into Abdelazar, or The Moor's Revenge (1676), her sole venture into Restoration tragedy. The play, under the title of "Lust's Dominion", has also been adapted in the 21st century.
