= The Merry Month of May =

The Merry Month of May may refer to:

- The Merry Month of May (novel), a 1971 novel by James Jones
- "The Merry Month of May" (poem), a 16th-/17th-century poem by Thomas Dekker
- The Merry Month of May, a 1955 film featuring Lee Hoi-chuen
- "The Merry Month Of May", regimental march of the 10th Royal Hussars
- "The Merry Month of May", Irish folksong whose tune was used for the ballad "The Patriot Game"
- "It is the Merry Month of May", a duet from Edward German's operetta Merrie England
- "In the merry merry month of May", memorable line from the song "The Fountain in the Park"
