= The Weakest Goeth to the Wall =

Elizabethan-era stage play

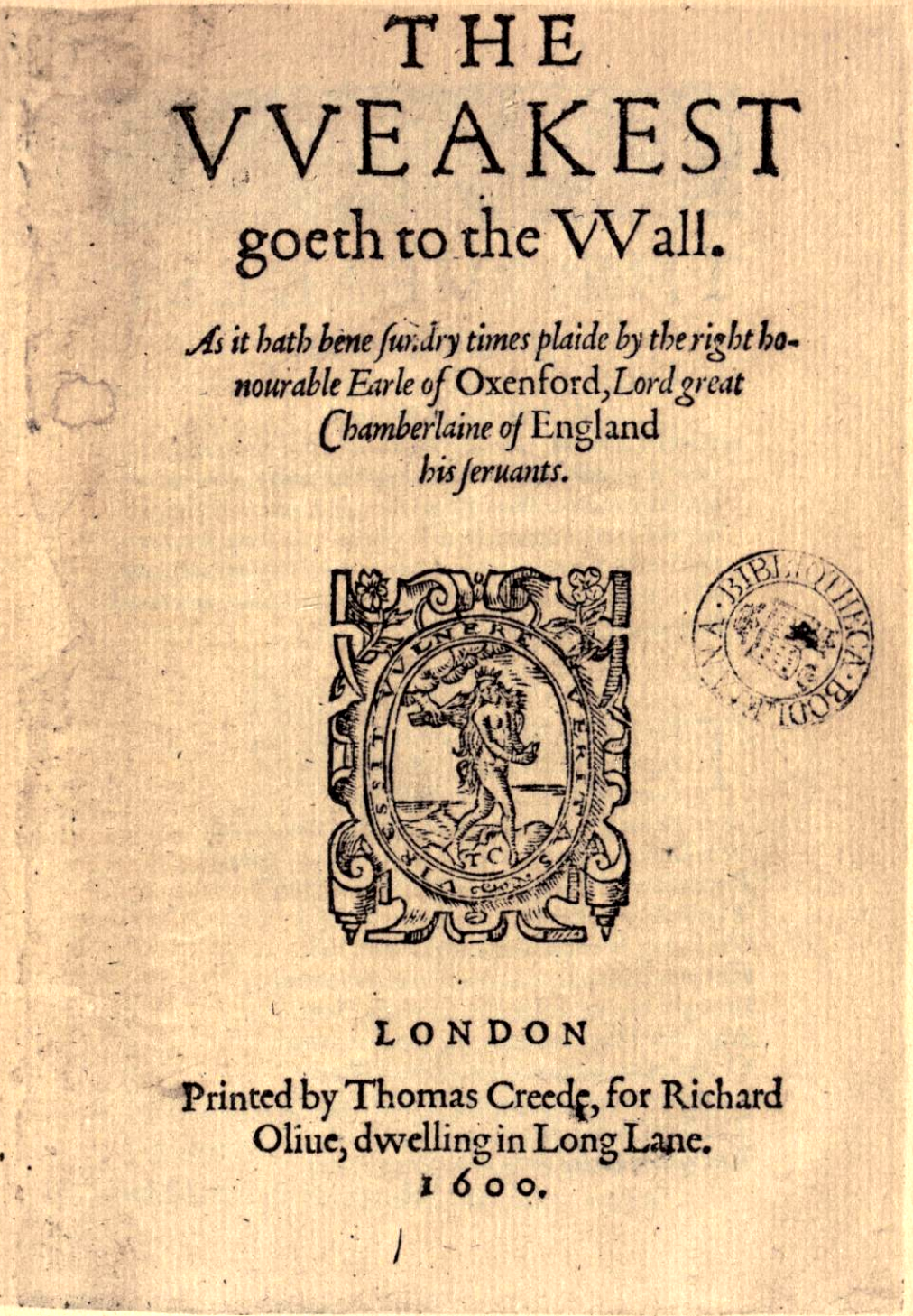
- Title page of the 1600 edition of The Weakest Goeth to the Wall
- Original language: English
- Genre: Tragicomedy

The Weakest Goeth to the Wall is an anonymous Elizabethan-era stage play. Though the play is set in France, its plot is a reworking of a novel and the work has no historical connection. It is an early example of the kind of romantic comedy which evolved, in the Jacobean period, into the dominant genre of tragicomedy, though its historical setting complicates its classification. The play was at one point attributed to John Webster, but this attribution is now considered erroneous, and the question of its authorship remains elusive, with Thomas Dekker the most widely-accepted candidate for (at least partial) authorship.

== Characters ==
- Louis – The King of France
- Lodowick – The Duke of Bullen (or Bulloigne)
- Mercury – The Duke of Anjou
- Barnabe Bunch – An English tailor and cobbler
- Jacob (or Yakob) Van Smelt – A Flemish innkeeper
- Oriana – Wife to Lodowick
- Diana – Lodowick's daughter
- Hernando de Medina – The Spanish General
- Ugo de Cordova – Lieutenant to Hernando
- Emmanuel – The Duke of Brabant
- Leontius – A courtier of Emmanuel's
- Ferdinand (Frederick) – Son to Lodowick who was lost as an infant and raised by Emmanuel
- Odilla – Daughter to Emmanuel
- Sir Nicholas – A parish priest
- Shamont – A courtier of Emmanuel's
- Lord Epernon – The French General
- Villiers – A merchant
- Two Gentlemen, three Citizens, two Messengers, a Nuncio, some members of Hernando's retinue, two Citizens of Shamount, two Soldiers in Epernon's service, two Messengers,

== Plot ==
John Genest summarized the plot of The Weakest Goeth to the Wall in the last of his ten-volume work on the history of the English stage as follows:

It begins with a dumb show: the Duke of Anjou kills the Duke of Burgundy — the Dutchess of Burgundy leaps into a river to avoid the French — she leaves Frederick, who is her nephew and an infant, on the bank — the Duke of Brabant finds the child, [and] here ends the dumb show. The King of France is very desirous to set out on a pilgrimage to Jerusalem; he reconciles the Dukes of Anjou and Bulloigne and appoints them to govern during his absence. (Lodwick, Duke of Bulloigne, is brother to the Dutchess of Burgundy). Anjou is so far from being sincere in his reconciliation, that he drives Lodwick by force of arms from Bulloigne. Lodwick, with his wife and daughter, Oriana and Diana, makes his escape into Flanders. Lodwick is reduced to poverty. He leaves his wife and daughter, and sets out to seek his fortune. He arrives at Ards in Picardy. He begs alms of Sir Nicholas, the Curate. Sir Nicholas has no money to spare, but offers him the place of sexton which is vacant; Lodwick accepts the offer. In the mean time the Spaniards invade France. They carry [i.e. defeat] all before them. Anjou opposes them, but is put to flight. the Duke of Brabant had brought up the child whom he had found, without knowing who he is; he calls him Ferdinand. Ferdinand becomes a man. He falls in love with Odillia, the Duke's daughter, [and] she falls in love with him. They make their escape, and come to Ards, where they are married [by Sir Nicholas], Lodwick being at that time sexton. Ferdinand's money is exhausted, [and] he is forced to leave Odillia and enter into the French army. The Duke of Epernoune and the rest of the French nobility issue a proclamation, inviting the Duke of Bulloigne to resume the government of the kingdom. He [Lodwick] leaves Ards in consequence of the proclamation. A battle takes place between the French and Spaniards— the latter are defeated, [and] Ferdinand distinguishes himself in the battle. The Dukes of Brabant and Bulloigne join the Duke of Epernoune. The Duke of Brabant, on seeing Ferdinand, is [enraged] — he insists that Ferdinand should be put to death, according to law, for having stolen the heiress of a prince without being a prince himself. Ferdinand turns out to be Frederick, and the son of the Duke of Bulloigne. The Duke of Brabant is reconciled [to Ferdinand and Bulloigne]. Odillia, Oriana and Diana arrive, and all ends happily.

== Date and text ==
The play was printed in two quarto volumes, the first in 1600, the second in 1618. Facsimile editions of these quartos were produced in the early 20th century by the Malone Society under the editorship of J. S. Farmer and W. W. Greg.

There is no consensus on the date of the play's authorship. If Rich's Farewell to the Military Profession is indeed the source of the play's plot (see Sources), then the play cannot be earlier than 1581. On stylistic grounds, Rev. Ronald Bayne requires it to come after the appearance of Marlowe's Tamburlaine in 1587, while noting the presence of "signs of an older style", viz. the couplet and the six-lined-stanza forms. This dates the play only to the range 1587–1600, and does not exclude the possibility of revision.

In her critical edition, Jill L. Levenson makes a case for dating the play to the late 1590s, arguing on the basis of the chronology the Earl of Oxford's Men, on entries in Henslowe's Diary, on the relevance of the political intrigue of the plot to the issue of succession crisis of England in the winter of 1597/8, and on the timeline of Dekker's career.

== Sources ==
The source for the plot of the play is the first novel of Barnabe Rich's eight-story collection Farewell to the Military Profession, published 1581. The connection was first identified by the editors of the Shakespeare Society (under John Payne Collier) in 1846. They write:

The incidents in the first novel of the ensuing series are very much the same as those of the play "The Weakest goeth to the Wall[.]" [...] Not one of the names of the characters is the same as in Rich's novel, the scene of action is entirely changed, and an attempt is made to give the piece a historical appearance, by the introduction of the King of France and various members of his court.

The editors go on to speculate that Rich's novel and The Weakest Goeth to the Wall may have had a common source, but modern scholarship rejects this, regarding the play as dependent on the novel for its plot.

== Authorship ==
The quarto editions list no author, but note the play "hath been sundry times plaid by the right-honourable Earle of Oxenford, Lord great Chamberlaine of England his seruants." Edward Phillips attributed the play to Webster and Dekker in 1675, but this is known to have been due to a catalogue misreading of a type common to Phillips's work. In any case, Webster's authorship has been roundly rejected by all modern scholars on stylistic and stylometric grounds.

The idea that Dekker had a hand in the play has seen a good deal of scholarly support. The comic characters in particular bear a "family likeness" (in the phrase of Mary Leland Hunt) to those in plays known to have been by Dekker. Thus, Barnaby Bunch, a jovial tradesman, brings to mind Simon Eyre, and Yakob van Smelt, a lecherous stage-Dutchman, speaks a dialect remarkably like those in Dekker's Northward Ho, Westward Ho, and The Shoemaker's Holiday. Indeed, this play is one of less than a dozen plays of the period to employ stage-Dutch, and the dialect in The Weakest Goeth to the Wall is markedly different from all stage-Dutch known to have been written by other authors (as, for instance, Marston's The Dutch Courtesan or Middleton's No Wit, No Help Like a Woman's).

Other candidates for authorship include Anthony Munday (favored by Collier and Bayne), on account of his and the play's connection to the Oxford's Men, under Edward de Vere (though the chronology which connects these two is disputed by Levenson); and Thomas Heywood, on stylometric grounds.

== Appraisal ==
The secondary literature on The Weakest Goeth to the Wall is very meager, and the play has seen only one critical edition: that of Jill L. Levenson. But the play has been seen favorably by those editors who have spent time working on it. In his four-volume edition of Webster's plays, William Carew Hazlitt quotes the praise of John Genest and John Payne Collier for the work. One of the most effusive is Rev. Bayne, who writes:

Its chief merit is the force and fluency of portions of its blank verse[.] [...] The humorous scenes are a great advance upon Kemp’s applauded "Merriments" already referred to. They are excellent examples of the low life comedy that grew out of the part of the extempore clown in earlier interludes. Barnaby Bunch the “botcher,” and Sir Nicholas the country vicar, are vigorously etched from contemporary English life, and speak a fluent vernacular prose which, in one or two places, recalls Falstaff. [...] but [Munday] cannot have written the sonorous blank verse of the historic scenes[.]

In terms of genre, the play belongs to the a small group of Elizabethan pseudohistorical romances. Within this group, it is the only one to display a substantial interest in politics.
