= Oxford's Men =

The Earl of Oxford’s Men, alternatively Oxford’s Players, were acting companies in late Medieval and Renaissance England patronised by the Earls of Oxford. The name was also sometimes used to refer to tumblers, musicians, and animal acts that were under the patronage of the Earls or hired by them. The most notable troupe of this name was the acting company of the Elizabethan era patronised by Edward de Vere, the 17th Earl of Oxford (1550-1604), that originally derived from an earlier company, the Earl of Warwick’s Men, and was active from 1580 to 1587. It was revived probably in the late 1590s and ultimately was absorbed by yet another troupe, Worcester's Men, in late 1602.

== Beginnings ==
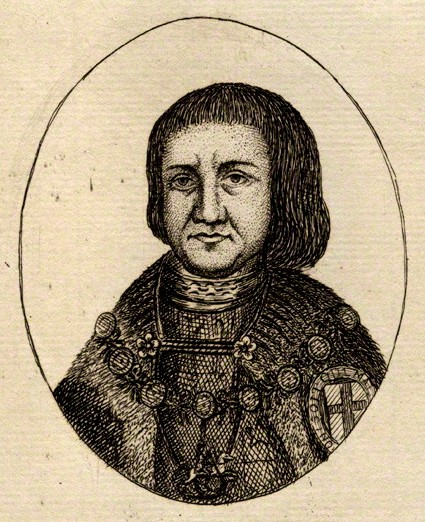
John de Vere, 15th Earl of Oxford, patronised not only a playing company but playwright John Bale. Engraving after funerary monument, National Portrait Gallery, London.

The Earl of Oxford’s Entertainers, a troupe patronised by John de Vere, 7th Earl of Oxford (1312 – 1360), was paid 6 shillings, 8 pence for a performance in Canterbury, Kent, on 29 September 1353 or 1354, the earliest record for an Oxford company. Records exist for 57 provincial performances of various animal acts, minstrels, musicians, and tumblers, including five performances by two playing companies, sponsored by the 13th earl (1442 – 1513) from 1465 to 1513, as well as two performances at the court of Henry VII. The 14th Earl (1499 – 1526) patronised animal acts and a minstrel company.

John de Vere, 15th Earl of Oxford (<1490 – 1540), kept a playing company and also employed John Bale to write six plays for them from 1534-6. A favourite of Henry VIII, after 1536 Oxford directed Bale to Richard Morison for his campaign against the Pope to write anti-Catholic propaganda plays.

John de Vere, 16th Earl of Oxford (1516 – 1562), maintained a playing company that toured the provinces and also played in London, most famously a performance in Southwark on 5 February 1547 at the same time of a dirge for Henry VIII a week after his death, despite the earl serving as one of the twelve chief mourners for the deceased monarch. Records for 25 separate provincial performances survive, and the troupe continued until two years after the earl's death.

== Edward de Vere, 17th Earl of Oxford ==
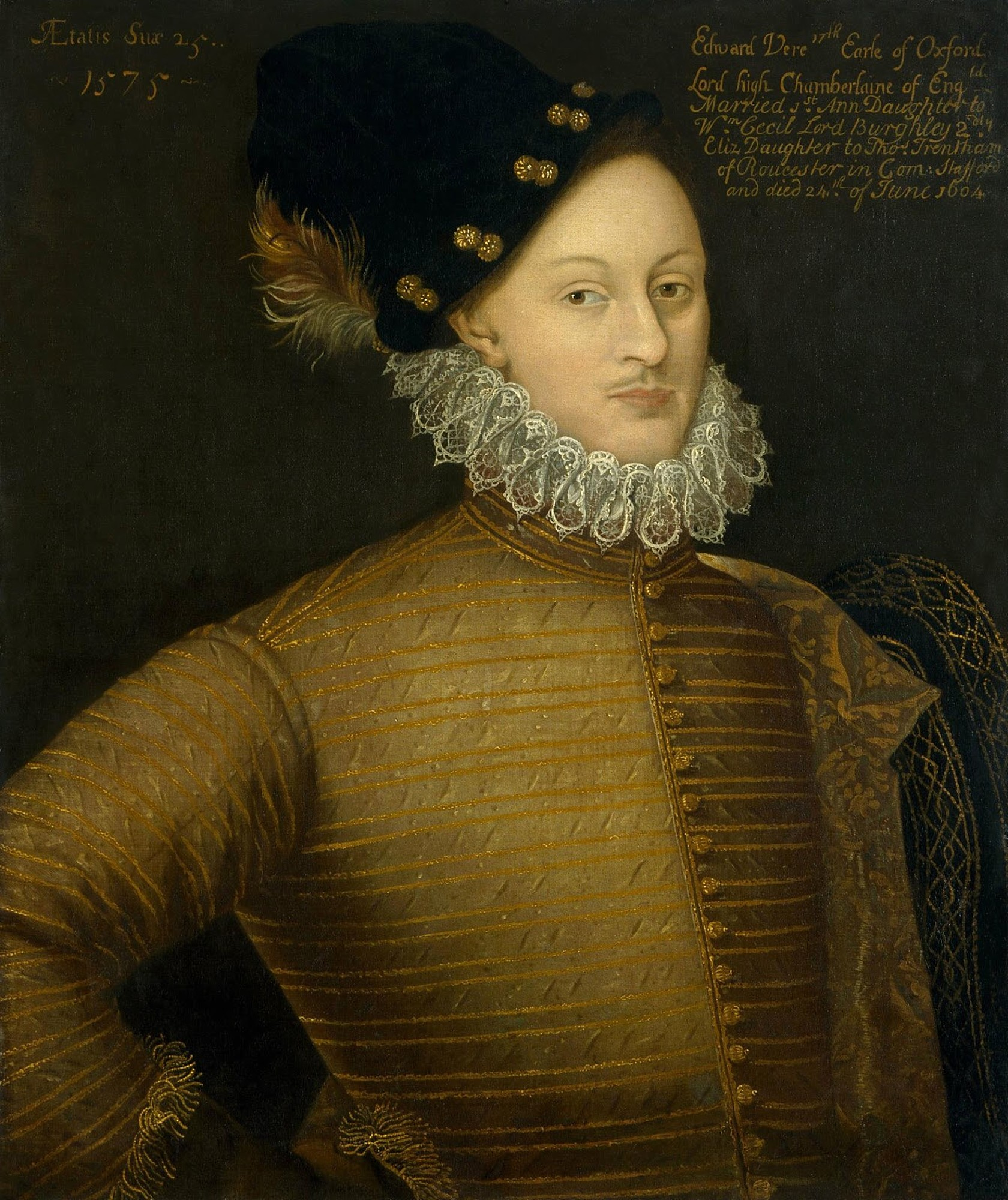
Edward de Vere, the 17th Earl of Oxford, was the patron of several theatrical companies. Unknown artist after lost original, 1575; National Portrait Gallery, London.

Edward de Vere, 17th Earl of Oxford (1550-1604), was an enthusiastic and persistent promoter of theatrical companies, and was himself known as a playwright. He sponsored both adult and boys' acting companies, and it is difficult to distinguish between their performance records. He also sponsored a Christmas 1584 court performance of tumbler John Symons and his group of acrobats between his tenure with Lord Strange's Men and Queen Elizabeth's Men.

Oxford’s adult playing company was formed with actors who were formerly members of the Earl of Warwick’s Men in the early 1580s during the period when noblemen were using their playing companies to promote themselves at court by competing to furnish court entertainments. The original members included the well-known actor brothers John and Laurence Dutton, Robert Leveson, Thomas Chesson, and possibly Jerome Savage and Richard Tarlton. The formation of the troupe by the desertion of the Duttons caused court gossip and served as the occasion of an excoriating poem by an unknown court poet in the tradition of scatological court flyting.

Oxford's players almost immediately got involved in a brawl with some Inns of Court students while playing at The Theatre in Shoreditch, and several members were thrown into gaol, but they were out and on the road by early June. De Vere solicited letters of recommendation for his players from his father-in-law, Lord Burghley, and the Lord Chamberlain, the Earl of Sussex, addressed to the vice-chancellor of Cambridge University. Burghley's letter is dated 9 June 1580:

Where the bearers hereof servauntes to the Right honorable my very good Lord the Erle of Oxford are desierous to repaire to that universitie and there to make shewe of such playes and enterludes as have bene by them heretofore played by them publykely, aswell before the Queens majestie as in the Citie of London, and intend to spend iiij or v. daies there in Cambridg as heretofore they have accustomed to do with other matters and arguments of late yeres, and because they might the rather be permitted so to do without empeachment or lett of yow the vicechauncelor or other the heades of howses, have desired my lettre unto yow in their favor.

No record exists of Oxford's players entertaining the court before 1583, so Burghley's claim that they had done so by 1580 is taken by Andrew Gurr as promotional hyperbole. Of course, court records of the time are unreliable. In any case, the vice-chancellor refused permission to play with the excuse that the plague was still feared and that commencement was at hand, and gave them 20 shillings towards their expenses.

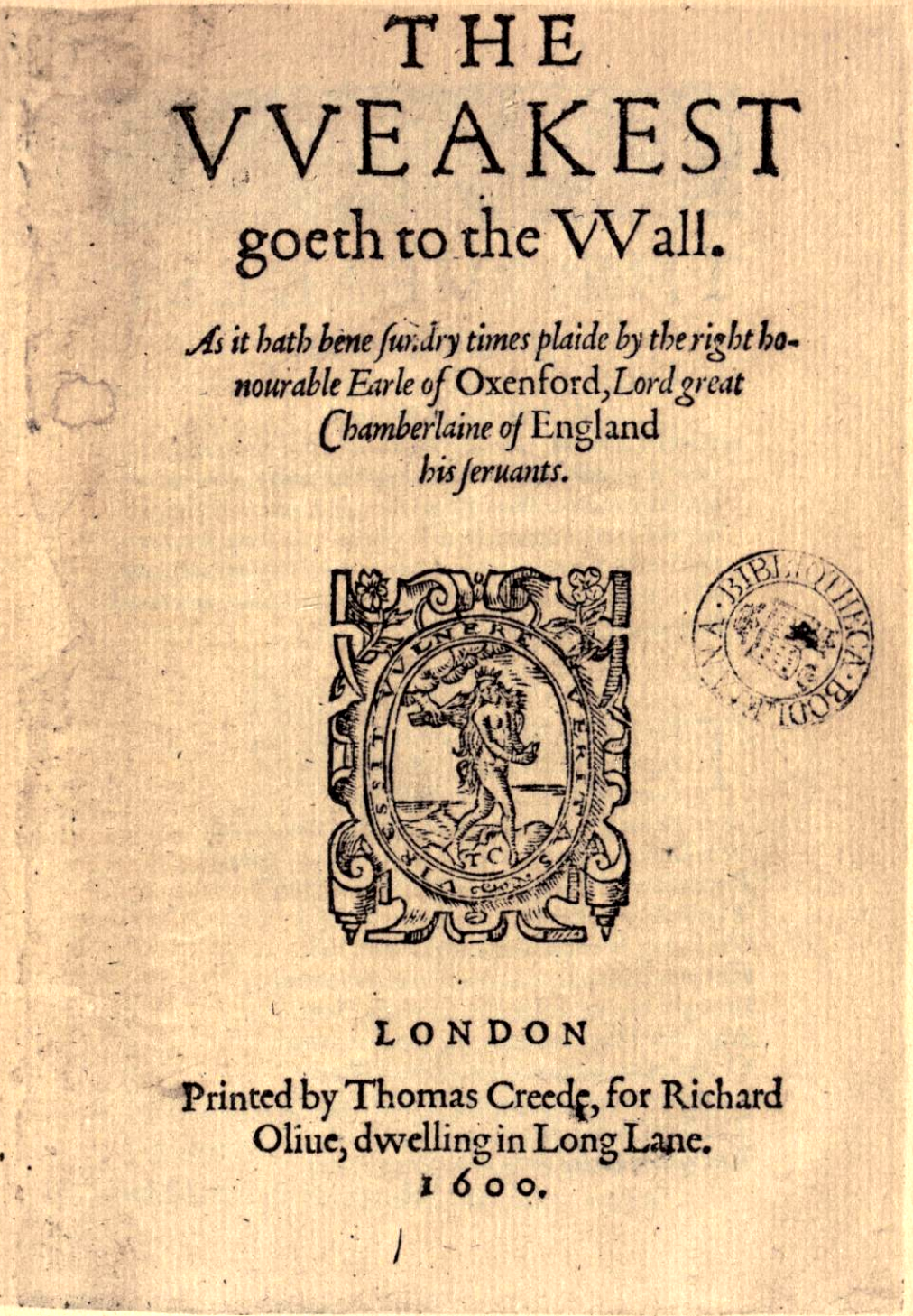
The Weakest Goeth to the Wall (1600), a play probably written by Thomas Dekker in the late 1590s, was in the 17th Earl of Oxford's Players' repertoire ("THE/VVEAKEST/goeth to the Wall./As it hath bene sundry times plaide by the right ho-/nourable Earle of Oxenford, Lord great/Chamberlaine of England his seruants. / LONDON / Printed by Thomas Creede, for Richard/Oliue, dwelling in Long Lane./1600")

The company supported itself touring the provinces in what appears to be a regular circuit that wound across England, ranging from Gloucestershire to Kent up to East Anglia, including towns in the Midlands. While Oxford's biographer Alan Nelson calls Oxford's troupe "one of the four principal companies of London" based it being mentioned in a 1587 letter complaining about stage plays, Gurr, a specialist in English Renaissance theatre, notes that no evidence exists that the company appeared regularly in London after 1580. John Dutton was drafted into the Queen's Men and left the company in 1583.
