= The Wonderfull Yeare =

1603 pamphlet by Thomas Dekker

The Wonderfull Yeare is Thomas Dekker's first pamphlet, written and printed in 1603, the year of Queen Elizabeth's death, James I's accession, and an outbreak of the bubonic plague in England.

== Context ==
Prior to writing The Wonderfull Yeare, Dekker was a playwright in London, but upon the closing of London's theatres in 1603 due to the plague, Dekker turned to pamphleteering to generate an income. Dekker was just one of thousands of Londoners affected by the outbreak of plague, though he did not actually become sick.

Dekker's work focuses on the "wonderful" events that took place in the London area in 1603, where "wonderful" refers to something surprising or astonishing. The year 1603 was generally characterised by extreme instability, both politically and economically.

== Summary ==
Dekker first eulogises the death of Queen Elizabeth I, who had been queen since 1558. He laments the Elizabethan golden age and recalls how England's joy was suddenly eclipsed by Elizabeth's death. Dekker personifies Death and blames him for taking the queen's life.

Dekker recalls how the announcement of Elizabeth's death "tooke away hearts from millions" and plunged her subjects into grief. He recalls the widespread lamentation at her death and includes in his work some of the epigrams written for her funeral at Whitehall. Dekker was not the only one to view the outbreak of plague as a divine consequence of Elizabeth's death.

Dekker then turns to the accession of James I: he says that the "holesome receipt of a proclaymed King" temporarily cured the grief caused by Elizabeth I's death. He recalls the sudden change in monarch and the particular effect that this has on the kingdom: "Upon Thursday it was treason to cry God save king James of England, and upon Friday treason not to cry so". He says that the feeling of the golden age returned in the first months of James I's rule, but when the plague struck in the summer of 1603, people were once again struck with lamentation.

The remainder of The Wonderfull Yeare recounts the horrors of the plague epidemic in 1603, both in London and the surrounding countryside. Dekker also gives the plague a persona in order to personally blame it for the thousands of deaths that it causes, and describes how the plague cannot be avoided: it affects everyone to some extent and takes its victims without warning. Dekker comments on how the number of plague victims could double from morning to night. Overall, Dekker concludes that Death has the last say, and the widespread fear of and the struggle to avoid death during 1603 made "fooles" of everyone.
