= Blurt, Master Constable =

1602 Elizabethan comedy

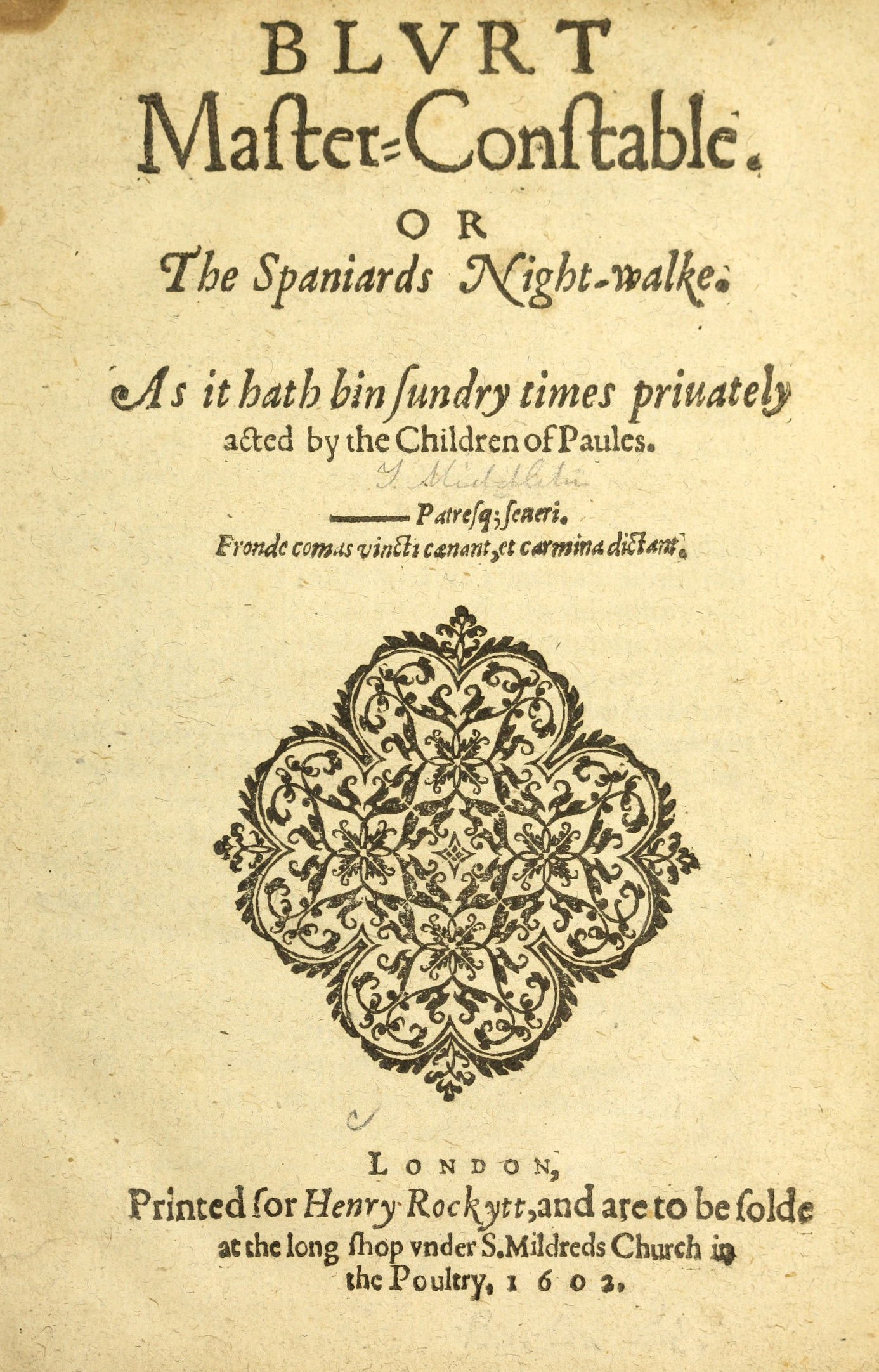
Title page of the first edition of Blurt, Master Constable (1602).

Blurt, Master Constable, or the Spaniards' Night Walk is a late Elizabethan comedy, printed anonymously in 1602 and usually attributed to either Thomas Middleton or Thomas Dekker.

The subtitle of the play, "The Spaniards' Night Walk," together with an allusion to the Spanish in Ireland in its final scene, helps to fix the date of composition to late 1601 or early 1602, following the Spanish landing in Ireland in September 1601 and their role in the battle of Kinsale. It was entered into the Stationers' Register on 7 June 1602, and published later in that year in quarto, printed by Edward Allde for the bookseller Henry Rocket. The title page of the quarto states that the play was acted by the Children of Paul's, one of the troupes of boy actors performing at the time.

== Authorship ==
There is no direct attribution of authorship in any contemporary source. Francis Kirkman, the Restoration era printer, attributed the play to Thomas Middleton in 1661. Thomas Dekker was first linked to the play by the scholar E. H. C. Oliphant in 1926. Since then, 20th-century scholars have looked at Blurt as the work of Middleton, or Dekker, or both. The majority view through much of the middle and later 20th century tended to favor the hypothesis that Blurt is a Dekker/Middleton collaboration. Yet David Lake, in his analysis of authorship problems in the Middleton canon, concludes that Middleton had nothing to do with the play and assigns the whole of it to Dekker with no collaborator.

== Synopsis ==
Camillo and Hippolito are young Venetian noblemen, just returned from the wars; Camillo brings with him a captured French gentleman named Fontinelle. Camillo turns his prisoner over to Hippolito's sister Violetta for safekeeping. Violetta is the object of Camillo's affections; but Fontinelle and Violetta fall in love. Learning of this unwelcome development, Camillo and Hippolito try to tempt Fontinelle to infidelity by sending his portrait to the courtesan Imperia, hoping to interest her in the Frenchman. The ploy fails (at first), and Camillio has Fontinelle thrown into prison. But Fontinelle and Violetta are secretly married. In the last act, however, the Venetians' plotting bears fruit: Fontinelle falls for Imperia, and Violetta has to resort to the standard Elizabethan bed trick to consummate her marriage.

Blurt has an obvious relationship with Shakespeare's Romeo and Juliet. The two lovers, partisans of opposing factions, meet at a ball and fall instantly in love; there is a balcony scene, and a secret marriage by a friar. Verbal echoes of Shakespeare's play also occur in Blurt — though the latter play is bawdier. A similar borrowing from Shakespeare's Much Ado About Nothing is evident in the play's comic subplot, which features the title character of Blurt the constable, rather as if Much Ado were titled Dogberry.
