= The Merry Month of May (poem) =

English poem by Thomas Dekker

"The Merry Month of May" is a poem by Thomas Dekker (c. 1572–1632), an English Elizabethan dramatist and pamphleteer. "The Merry Month of May" is a part of Dekker's play The Shoemaker's Holiday, first performed in 1599. In Ernest Rhys's 1887 publication of Dekker's work, he titled the poem The First Three-Men's Song.

The poem is included within Act 3 Scene V of the play.

== Text ==
O the month of May, the merry month of May,
So frolic, so gay, and so green, so green, so green!
O, and then did I unto my true love say:
"Sweet Peg, thou shalt be my summer's queen!

Now the nightingale, the pretty nightingale,
The sweetest singer in all the forest's choir,
Entreats thee, sweet Peggy, to hear thy true love's tale;
Lo, yonder she sitteth, her breast against a brier.

But O, I spy the cuckoo, the cuckoo, the cuckoo;
See where she sitteth: come away, my joy;
Come away, I prithee: I do not like the cuckoo
Should sing where my Peggy and I kiss and toy."

O the month of May, the merry month of May,
So frolic, so gay, and so green, so green, so green!
And then did I unto my true love say:
"Sweet Peg, thou shalt be my summer's queen!"
