= Patient Grissel =

Elizabethan drama by Thomas Dekker, Henry Chettle, and William Haughton

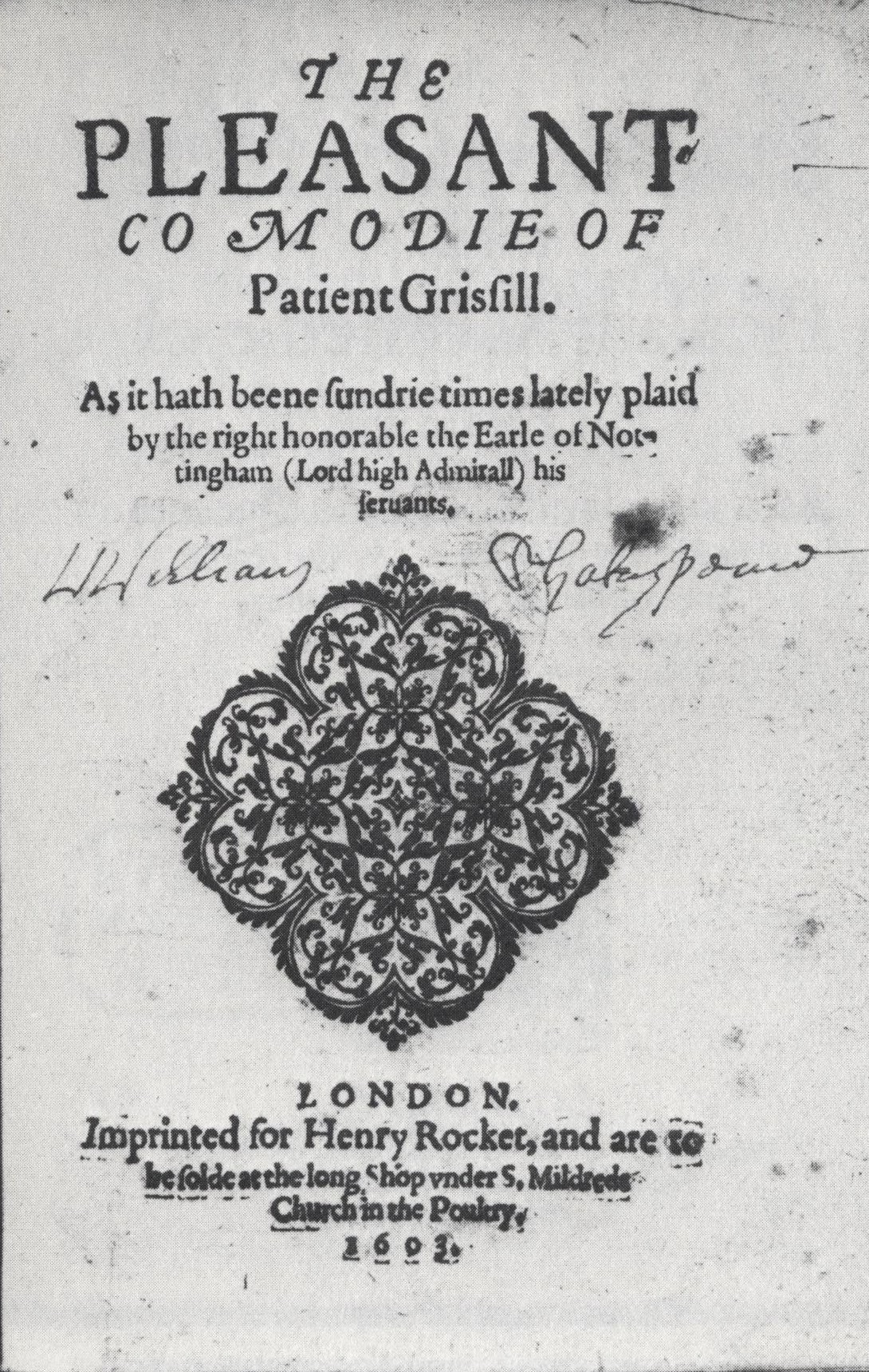
1603 title page

Patient Grissel, or Patient Grissil, is a comedy by Thomas Dekker, written in collaboration with Henry Chettle and William Haughton in 1600. It is a variation of the Griselda folktale. More than three centuries later, Paul McCartney of the Beatles adapted a lullaby from the play, "Golden Slumbers", into a song of the same name, having encountered the sheet music for the lullaby in a book of nursery rhymes.

== Plot ==
The Concise Oxford Companion to English Literature gives the following plot summary: "The marquess of Salucia, smitten with the beauty of Grissil, the virtuous daughter of a poor basket‐maker, makes her his bride. Wishing to try her patience, he subjects her to a series of humiliations and cruelties."

== Background ==
Patient Grissel was first printed in 1603 and, according to the scholar John Payne Collier, premiered by 1600. A variation of the medieval tale of Griselda, it is one of three extant Elizabethan works to adapt the tale, the other two being John Phillip's morality play The Play of Patient Grissel (c. 1558–1566) and Thomas Deloney's ballad "Of Patient Grissel and a Noble Marquess" (c. 1593). The tale itself was first recorded in Giovanni Boccaccio's Decameron in 1353; over 40 years later, Geoffrey Chaucer based his "Clerk's Tale" on an expanded version by Petrarch. By the mid-17th century, the Griselda legend had faded into irrelevance. Patient Grissel is mentioned in Henslowe's diary.

== Critical analysis ==
Elizabethan adaptations of the tale of Griselda have generally been ignored in academia. The scholar Vivian Comensoli notes that Elizabethan writers departed from the medieval adaptations' focus on Christian submission in marriage and instead covered the "desirability of marriage." Whereas Phillip's and Deloney's works feature the motif of the wife relieving marital turmoil by staying patient and modest, Patient Grissel employs a more nuanced perspective. Comensoli adds that it "explores more fully than do its analogues the male-female/sovereign-subject hierarchies, relating marriage to a broader framework encompassing the individual's ambiguous relationship to social rank and authority." Thus, it reflects the conflict between the Christian ideal of family and the reality of domestic trouble in late-16th-century/early-17th-century societal outlooks. In light of this, Comensoli considers Patient Grissel "the most innovative and complex of the Renaissance versions of the Griselda legend." Collier writes, "The subject [of the play] cannot be said to be a very good one for the stage, however easily adapted, because the chief incidents are violent and improbable."

== "Golden Slumbers" ==
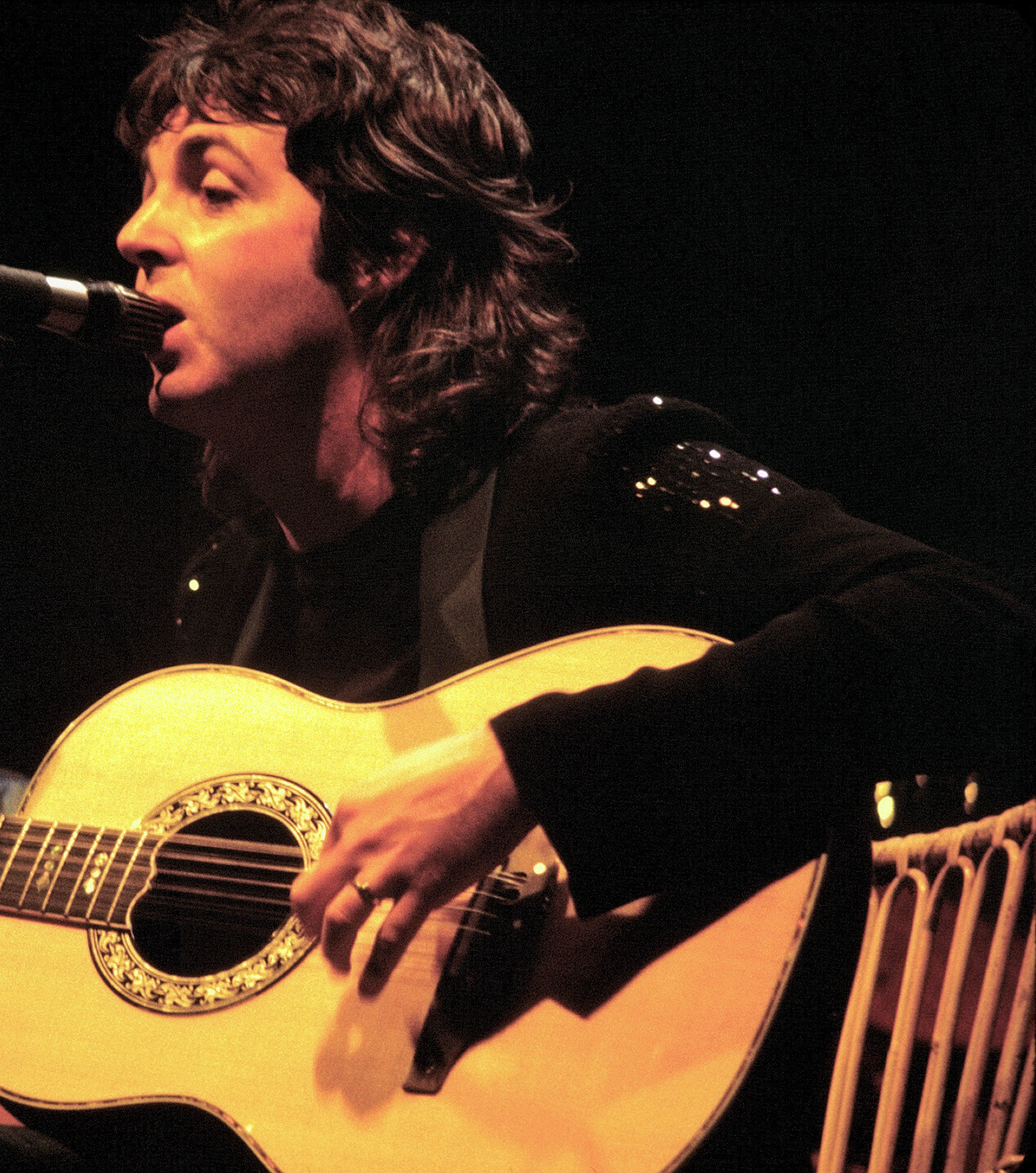
Paul McCartney of the Beatles (pictured in 1976) adapted a lullaby from the play into "Golden Slumbers".

Act 4, Scene 2, features Dekker's lullaby "Golden Slumbers", later adapted by Paul McCartney for the song of the same name on Abbey Road (1969). He had found the sheet music for "Golden Slumbers" in a nursery rhymes collection in his father's house near Liverpool. Since he could not read music, he wrote his own tune. McCartney later said, "I thought it was very restful, a very beautiful lullaby …". As the Beatles historian Kenneth Womack notes, Dekker's poem was repurposed into a rock song providing comfort against "the painful realities of interpersonal strife, adulthood, and loss." McCartney added the lines, "Once there was a way to get back homeward," and, "Once there was a way to get back home."

Golden slumbers kiss your eyes,
Smiles awake you when you rise.
Sleep, pretty wantons; do not cry,
And I will sing a lullaby:
Rock them, rock them, lullaby.

Care is heavy, therefore sleep you;
You are care, and care must keep you;
Sleep, pretty wantons; do not cry,
And I will sing a lullaby:
Rock them, rock them, lullaby.
