= The Virgin Martyr =

Play by Thomas Dekker and Philip Massinger

The Virgin Martyr is a Jacobean era stage play, a tragedy written by Thomas Dekker and Philip Massinger, and first published in 1622. It constitutes a rare instance in Massinger's canon in which he collaborated with a member of the previous generation of English Renaissance dramatists – those who began their careers in the 1590s, the generation of Shakespeare, Lyly, Marlowe and Peele.

== Performance and publication ==
The play was licensed for performance on 6 October 1620; the license refers to a "reforming" of the play, which has been taken to indicate an element of censorship. The work was reportedly staged at the Red Bull Theatre.

The play was popular, and was revived during the Restoration era, in 1661 and 1668, when it was seen by Samuel Pepys. John Dryden was influenced by the Dekker/Massinger play in writing his Tyrannick Love, or The Royal Martyr (1669).

The Virgin Martyr was published in quarto in 1622, with subsequent quarto editions in 1631, 1651, and 1661. The 1661 quarto, a reprint of the 1651 text, was "the only play by Massinger to be printed without alteration during the Restoration period."

== Collaboration ==
Scholars have disputed the nature of that collaboration: it has been suggested that the extant text may be a revision by Massinger of the lost play Diocletian (1594). Others have doubted this hypothesis, since it supposes that Dekker wrote the lost Diocletian, a conclusion for which there is no evidence. And since Diocletian is a secondary figure in The Virgin Martyr, it can make as much sense to suppose that the two are completely different plays.

Critics have tended to argue that Dekker most likely wrote the prose comedy scenes in the play, while Massinger concentrated on the main plot. Some have also seen Dekker's hand in the title role of Dorothea. Massinger would return to the subject of Diocletian's reign two years after this play, in The Prophetess, one of his collaborations with John Fletcher.

== Sources ==
The play's central event, the martyrdom of St. Dorothea of Caesarea, is mentioned by John Foxe in his Acts and Monuments, or Book of Martyrs. Robert S. Miola claims that Dekker and Massinger modeled their play on the Mercia of Joseph Simon, a tragedia sacra on Saint Chad. However, that argument is implausible: Mercia by Joseph Simons was published only in 1648.

== Genre ==
The Virgin Martyr has been categorized as a "saint's play" or tragedia sacra, a dramatic form that evolved in Roman Catholic societies after the Counter-Reformation, but was generally unknown in Protestant England. The work has been called "the only post-Reformation saint's play on the London stage before the theatres were closed in 1642." Critics have disagreed as to whether the play indicates something about the personal faith of the authors; it has sometimes been taken as an indication of Massinger's supposed Catholicism, though other commentators have considered the play a work of superficial and sensational entertainment, produced "for exclusively theatrical purposes" with no larger religious meaning. (If the play had been perceived as pro-Catholic in its own era, it would not have been allowed on the stage.)

The play presents several challenging aspects. It is generally classed as a tragedy, since the protagonist dies at the end – but the spiritual message of the play complicates the normal catharsis of tragedy. (If Sophocles or Shakespeare showed Oedipus or Hamlet returning as a happy ghost at the end of his play, the drama in question would be very different.) The Virgin Martyr presents problems of staging, such as the appearance of an "invisible" angel in Act IV. In his edition of Massinger's works, William Gifford notes that the Admiral's Men had among their props a "robe for to go invisible." Gifford speculates that "It was probably of a light gauzy texture, and afforded a sufficient hint to our good-natured ancestors, not to see the character invested with it." The same or a similar effect could have been employed in The Virgin Martyr.

The subject matter of the play, Christian conversion and martyrdom, is almost guaranteed to provoke passionate and extreme reactions. A few have classed the play among Massinger's best works; yet Charles Kingsley called it "one of the foulest plays known," one that "contains the most supra-lunar rosepink of piety, devotion and purity" coupled with "the stupidest abominations of any extant play." Modern critics have focused a more tempered attention on the play's religious and spiritual themes.

== Music ==
The play was also associated with dramatic and innovative uses of music in its productions. Its music inspired one of the most striking entries in Pepys' Diary: "but that which did please me beyond any thing in the whole world was the wind-musique when the Angell comes down, which is so sweet that it ravished me; and endeed, in a word, did wrap up my soul so that it made me really sick, just as I have formerly been when in love with my wife." (Pepys was then unfamiliar with the exotic sounds of the recorder, a rare instrument in England at the time.)

== Synopsis ==
The play, which is based on the life of the historical Dorothea of Caesarea, is set in Caesarea during the reign of the Roman emperor Diocletian, one of the last of the pagan emperors before Constantine I's conversion to Christianity. The opening scene shows the arrival in the city of Diocletian and his daughter Artemia, and introduces the local governor, Sapritius, and his main persecutor of Christians, Theophilus. Theophilus is ruthless and brutal in his pursuit of Christians to torture and execute; he is assisted by his secretary Harpax, who is an actual devil in human guise, and who uses second sight to aid his master's activities. The Roman emperor and his court are celebrating a victory over rebellious vassals; Diocletian gives his daughter a choice among three captured kings for her husband – but Artemia prefers Antoninus, the son of governor Sapritius and the hero of the recent battle.

Antoninus, however, is deeply reluctant to accept the young woman, to the distress and outrage of the assembled company. Antoninus later confesses to his friend Macrinus that he is in love with the local maiden Dorothea; this is why he cannot accept Artemia as his wife.

Act II introduces Dorothea and her household servants, Angelo, Spungius, and Hircius. Spungius is "a drunkard," and Hircius is "a whoremaster;" both have accepted Christianity under Dorothea's influence, though they have trouble avoiding their habitual vices. (The two provide the play's comic relief, though their dialogues also contain the "foulness" that distressed traditional critics like Kingsley.) Angelo, in contrast, is an angel in disguise, and serves as Dorothea's guide and guardian. Dorothea is presented in highly idealized terms as an epitome of "Beauty and chastity;" she is also a Christian, and Theophilus is aware of her and is eager to apprehend her. Antoninus pursues her in the hope of marriage, though Dorothea resists him. One of their interviews is spied upon by Artemia and Theophilus (Dorothea has been betrayed to them by Hircius and Spungius). Dorothea is taken into custody for her faith, but Theophilus wants a chance of converting her to paganism once again, which would be an even greater triumph than merely killing her. Theophilus sends his two daughters to convert Dorothea – but Dorothea's faith is so strong, and her words and example so persuasive, that the two young pagan women are instead converted to Christianity. They astound their father by overturning and spitting upon a statue of Jupiter; Theophilus is so outraged that he murders both of his daughters on the spot.

Spungius and Hircius fare badly once they are out of Dorothea's service. Angelo gives them gold, but they waste it on their vices, and then fall under the influence of Harpax. Antoninus falls ill after Dorothea is arrested, and pines away during her time in custody. Sapritius, disgusted with his son's weakness, orders a British slave to rape Dorothea – but the slave indignantly refuses. Theophilus tries to have Dorothea publicly beaten by her two former servants, but the abuse is totally ineffective: Dorothea is protected by divine influence, and Hircius and Spungius are themselves beaten for their failure. Finally, Dorothea is taken to the scaffold to be executed. Angelo appears in his true angelic form, invisible to all but Dorothea – and Harpax, who is driven away by the angelic radiance. Dorothea mocks pagan beliefs in Tempe and the Garden of the Hesperides, and claims that the joys of the Christian Heaven put these to shame; Theophilus sarcastically requests her to send him some of Heaven's choice fruits when she gets there. Dorothea is beheaded; Antoninus dies of his illness at the same time.

In the play's final Act, Theophilus is visited by Angelo in angelic form, and receives the gift of Heavenly fruits that he'd sarcastically requested. Through meeting an angel and tasting the fruits of Heaven, Theophilus is converted to Christianity. He drives Harpax away with a crucifix, and then confronts Diocletian and Sapritius; they have him tortured in response. Angelo and the spirits of Dorothea, Antoninus, and the two murdered daughters appear to Theophilus as he is being tortured; their influence allows him to go to his death in a state of bliss.
