= John Day (dramatist) =

English dramatist (1574–c.1638)

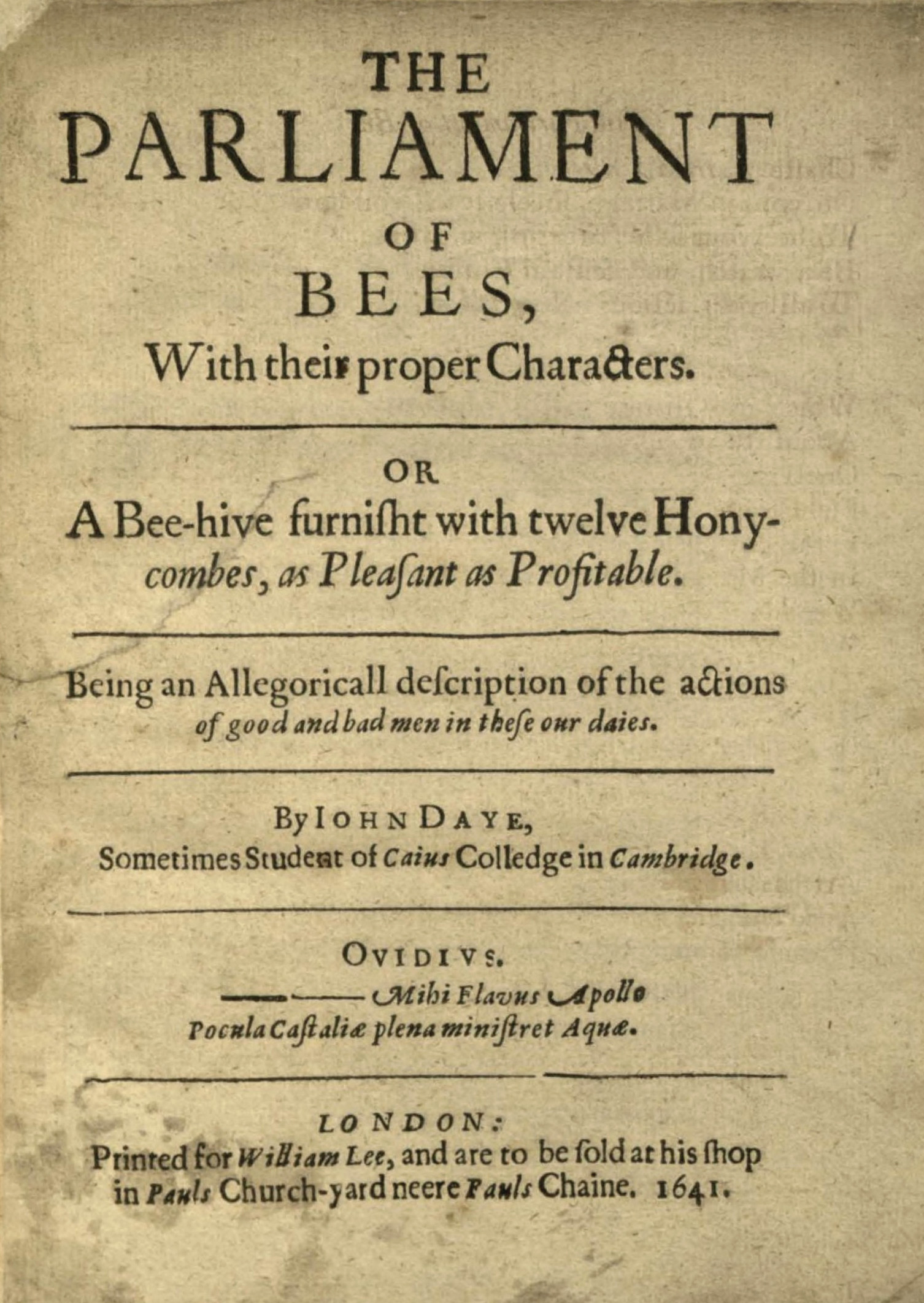
Title page of the first edition of Parliament of the Bees (1641)

John Day (1574–1638?) was an English dramatist of the Elizabethan and Jacobean periods.

== Life ==
He was born at Cawston, Norfolk, and educated at Ely. He became a sizar of Caius College, Cambridge, in 1592, but was expelled in the next year for stealing a book. He became one of Philip Henslowe's playwrights, collaborating with Henry Chettle, William Haughton, Thomas Dekker, Richard Hathwaye and Wentworth Smith. There are 22 plays to which he is linked.

However his almost incessant activity does not seem to have paid, to judge by the small loans, of five shillings and even two shillings, that he obtained from Henslowe. Little is known of his life beyond these small details, and disparaging references by Ben Jonson in 1618/19, describing him, (with Dekker and Edward Sharpham) as a "rogue" and (with Thomas Middleton and Gervase Markham) as a "base fellow". It may be indicative of his abilities that of all the writers who did a substantial amount of work for Henslowe's companies Day is one of only two not mentioned and praised by Francis Meres in his lists of "the best" writers in 1598. In Peregrinatio Scholastica, or Learning's Pilgrimage, a collection of 22 morall Tractes written towards the end of his life, but not published until 1881, he laments that "notwithstanding . . . Industry . . . he was forct to take a napp at Beggars Bushe", and elsewhere he refers to "being becalmde in a fogg of necessity" having been passed over by "Credit" and "Opinion". It seems likely that he was the "John Daye, yeoman" who killed fellow dramatist Henry Porter in Southwark 1599. If so it does not seem have to interrupted his career; he continued to collaborate with writers such as Henry Chettle, who had written with Porter.

== Works ==
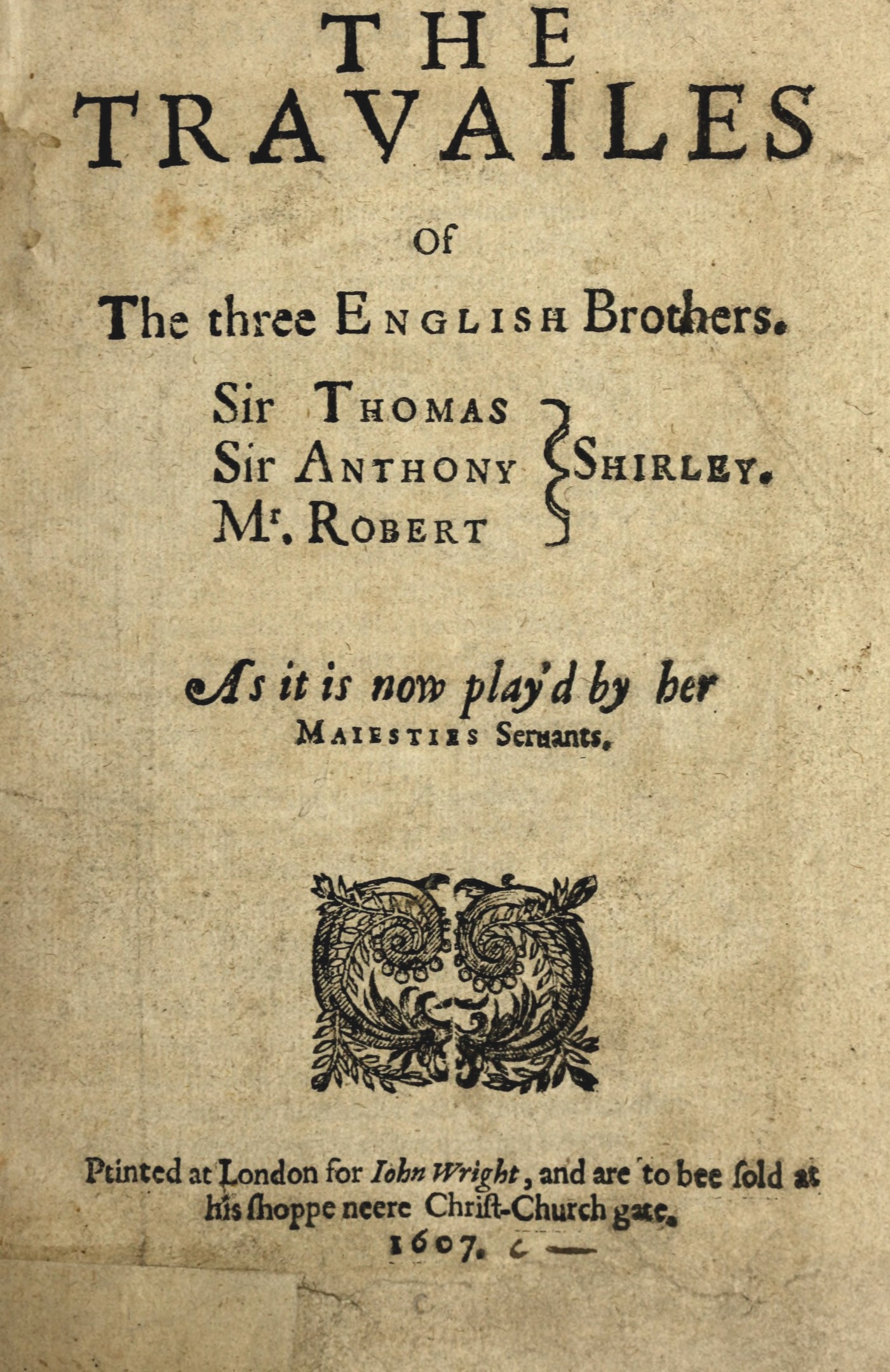
Title page of the first edition of The Travails of the Three English Brothers (1607)

The first play in which Day appears as part-author is The Conquest of Brute, with the finding of the Bath (1598), which, with most of his early work, is lost. Day's earliest extant work, written in collaboration with Chettle, is The Blind Beggar of Bethnal Green (acted 1600, printed 1659), a drama dealing with the early years of the reign of Henry VI. It bore the sub-title of The Merry Humor of Tom Strowd, the Norfolk Yeoman, and was so popular that second and third parts, by Day and Haughton, were produced in the next year. The Isle of Gulls (printed 1606), a prose comedy founded upon Sir Philip Sidney's Arcadia, contains in its light dialogue much satire to which the key is now lost, but Algernon Charles Swinburne notes in Manasses's burlesque of a Puritan sermon is a curious anticipation of the eloquence of Mr. Chadband in Bleak House. In 1607 Day produced, in conjunction with William Rowley and George Wilkins, The Travels of the Three English Brothers, which detailed the adventures of Sir Thomas, Sir Anthony and Robert Shirley. This play is a dramatic romance of a type that hearkened back to the early decades of the public stage in London. In 1608 Day published two comedies, Law-trickes: Or, Who Would have Thought It and Humour out of Breath.

The Parliament of Bees is the work on which Day's reputation chiefly rests. The piece contains much for which parallel passages are found in Thomas Dekker's Wonder of a Kingdom (1636) and The Noble Spanish Soldier (printed 1634). The passages which echo The Noble Spanish Soldier include references to speaking Spanish which are only meaningful in the context of Dekker's play; this suggests that the Dekker play is the original, a possibility reinforced by the consideration that there is no known edition of The Parliament of Bees earlier than 1641.

The six dramas by Day which we possess show a delicate fancy and dainty inventiveness all his own. He preserved, in a great measure, the dramatic tradition of John Lyly, and affected a kind of subdued euphuism. Without ever wholly abandoning these characteristics, Day's comedy also reveals some influence of early Jacobean satirists such as John Marston, who like Day wrote for the children's companies. The Maid's Metamorphosis (1600), once supposed to be a posthumous work of Lyly's, may be an early work of Day's. It possesses, at all events, many of his marked characteristics. His prose Peregrinatio Scholastica or Learninges Pilgrimage, dating from his later years, was printed by A. H. Bullen from a manuscript of Day's. Considerations partly based on this work have suggested that he had a share in the anonymous The Pilgrimage to Parnassus and the Return from Parnassus. The beauty and ingenuity of The Parliament of Bees were noted and warmly extolled by Charles Lamb; and Day's work has since found many admirers. The date of his death is unknown, but an elegy on him by John Tatham, the city poet, was published in 1640.

== Publication ==
His works, edited by Bullen, were printed at the Chiswick Press in 1881. The same editor included The Maid's Metamorphosis in Vol. 1 of his Collection of Old Plays. The Parliament of Bees and Humour out of Breath were printed in Nero and other Plays (Mermaid Series, 1888), with an introduction by Arthur Symons. An appreciation by Algernon Charles Swinburne appeared in The Nineteenth Century (October 1897).
