= Thomas Dekker (writer) =

English dramatist and pamphleteer (c. 1572–1632)

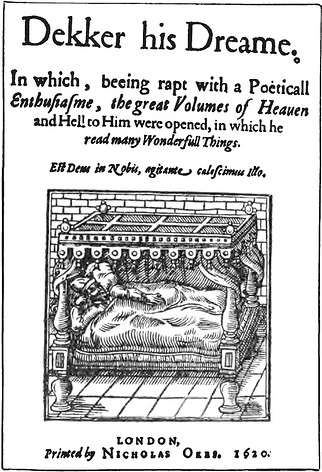
- Thomas Dekker lying in bed, from the title page of Dekker his Dreame (1620)
- Born: c. 1572; London, England
- Died: 25 August 1632 (aged 60); London, England
- Occupation: Writer

Thomas Dekker (c. 1572 – 25 August 1632) was an English Elizabethan dramatist and pamphleteer, a versatile and prolific writer, whose career spanned several decades and brought him into contact with many of the period's most famous dramatists.

== Early life ==
Little is known of Dekker's early life or origins. From references in his pamphlets, Dekker is believed to have been born in London around 1572, but nothing is known for certain about his youth. His last name suggests Dutch ancestry, and his work, some of which is translated from Latin, suggests that he attended grammar school.

== Career ==
Dekker embarked on a career as a theatre writer in the middle 1590s. His handwriting is found in the manuscript of Sir Thomas More, though the date of his involvement is undetermined. More certain is his work as a playwright for the Admiral's Men of Philip Henslowe, in whose account book he is first mentioned in early 1598. While there are plays connected with his name performed as early as 1594, it is not clear that he was the original author; his work often involved revision and updating. Between 1598 and 1602, he was involved in about forty plays for Henslowe, usually in collaboration. To these years belong the collaborations with Ben Jonson and John Marston, which presumably contributed to the War of the Theatres in 1600 and 1601. But Dekker is credited as the sole author of The Shoemaker's Holiday (1599), his acknowledged masterpiece – a boisterous, rowdy comedy of London life as seen through the eyes of a romanticist. Francis Meres includes Dekker in his list of notable playwrights in 1598.

For Jonson, however, Dekker was a bumbling hack, a "dresser of plays about town"; Jonson lampooned Dekker as Demetrius Fannius in Poetaster and as Anaides in Cynthia's Revels. Dekker's riposte, Satiromastix, performed both by the Lord Chamberlain's Men and the child actors of Paul's, casts Jonson as an affected, hypocritical Horace.

Satiromastix marks the end of the "poetomachia"; in 1603, Jonson and Dekker collaborated again, on a pageant for the Royal Entry, delayed from the coronation of James I, for which Dekker also wrote the festival book The Magnificent Entertainment. After this commission, however, the early Jacobean period was notably mixed for the author. In late 1602, he appears to have broken his association with Henslowe, for unknown reasons. He wrote for Worcester's Men for a time, then returned to the Admiral's Men (now patronized by Prince Henry) to produce The Honest Whore, an apparent success. But the failures of The Whore of Babylon (1607) and If It Be Not Good, the Devil Is In It (indicated as If This Be Not a Good Play, the Devil Is In It on the first page of the play; 1612) left him crestfallen; the latter play was rejected by Prince Henry's Men before failing for Queen Anne's Men at the Red Bull Theatre.

== Legal troubles ==
In 1612, Dekker's lifelong problem with debt (he had earlier, 1599, been imprisoned in Poultry Compter) reached a crisis when he was imprisoned in the King's Bench Prison on a debt of forty pounds to the father of John Webster. He remained there for seven years, and despite the support of associates such as Edward Alleyn and Endymion Porter, these years were difficult; Dekker reports that the experience turned his hair white. He continued as pamphleteer throughout his years in prison.

== Later years ==
On release, he resumed writing plays, now with collaborators both from his generation (John Day and John Webster) and slightly younger writers (John Ford and Philip Massinger). Among these plays is one, Keep the Widow Waking (1624, with Ford, Webster, and William Rowley), which dramatized two recent murders in Whitechapel. In the latter half of the decade, Dekker turned once more to pamphlet-writing, revamping old work and writing a new preface to his most popular tract, The Bellman of London.

== Death ==
Dekker died on 25 August 1632 and was buried at St James's Church, Clerkenwell.

== Work ==
=== Drama ===
- Old Fortunatus (1599)
- The Shoemaker's Holiday (1599)
- The Weakest Goeth to the Wall (a. 1600)
- Lust's Dominion (1600)
- Satiromastix (1601)
- Blurt, Master Constable (1601–02)
- The London Prodigal (1603)
- Patient Grissel (1603) (co-written with Henry Chettle and William Haughton)
- The Merry Devil of Edmonton (1604)
- The Honest Whore (1604) (co-written with Thomas Middleton)
- Westward Ho (1604) (co-written with John Webster)
- Northward Ho (1607) (co-written with Webster)
- Sir Thomas Wyatt (1607) (co-written with Webster)
- The Bloody Banquet (1608–09) (co-written with Middleton)
- The Roaring Girl (1607–10) (co-written with Middleton)
- Match Me in London (1611)
- If It Be Not Good, the Devil Is In It (1612)
- The Tragical History of Guy Earl of Warwick (1620)
- The Virgin Martyr (1620) (co-written with Philip Massinger)
- The Witch of Edmonton (1621) (co-written with William Rowley and John Ford)
- The Noble Spanish Soldier (1622)
- The Spanish Gypsy (1623) (co-written with Rowley, Middleton and Ford)
- The Sun's Darling (1624) (co-written with Ford)

When Dekker began writing plays, Thomas Nashe and Thomas Lodge were still alive; when he died, John Dryden had already been born. Like most dramatists of the period, he adapted as well as he could to changing tastes; however, even his work in the fashionable Jacobean genres of satire and tragicomedy bears the marks of his Elizabethan training: its humour is genial, its action romantic. The majority of his surviving plays are comedies or tragicomedies.

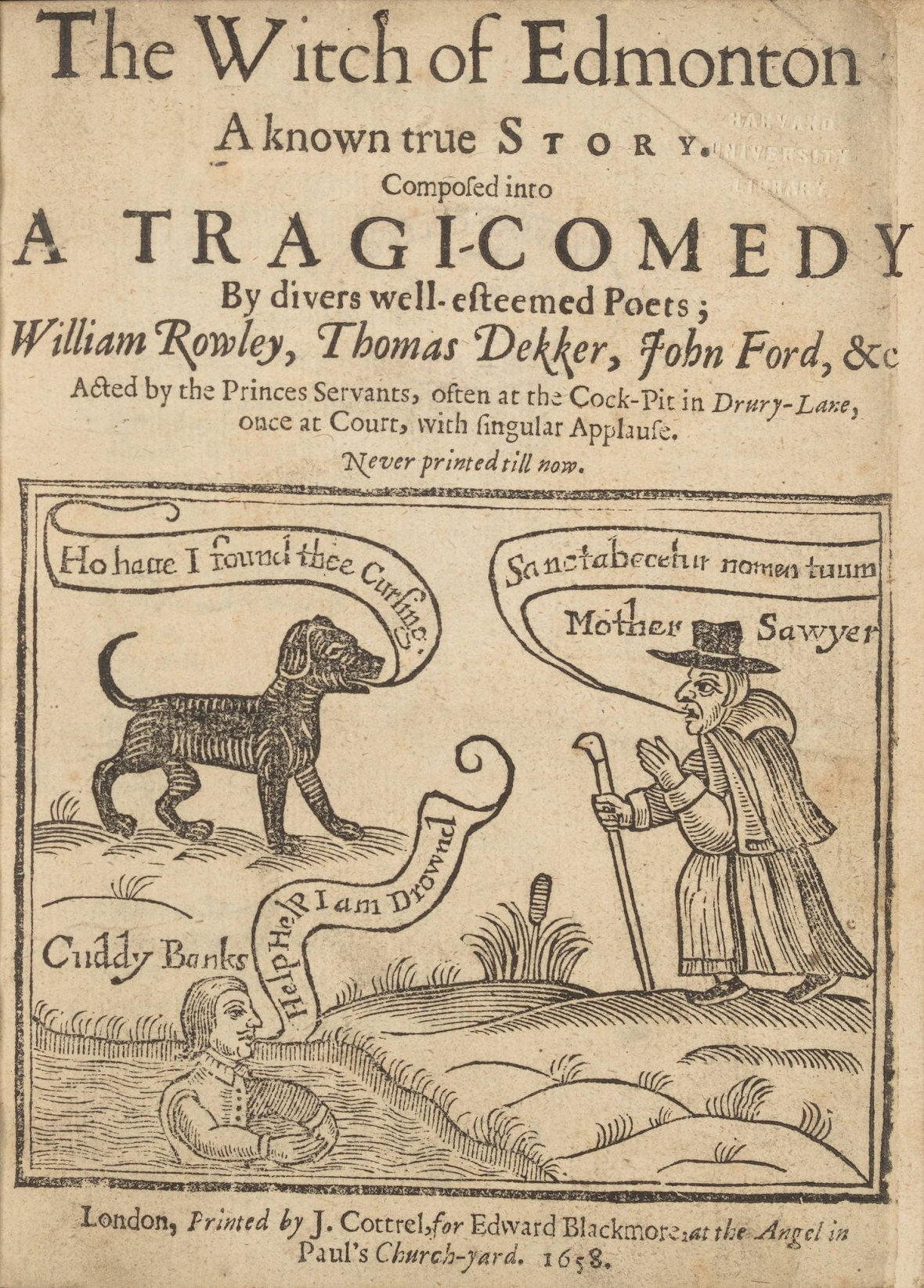
Title page from a 1658 printed edition of The Witch of Edmonton

Most of Dekker's work is lost. His apparently disordered life, and his lack of a firm connection (such as Shakespeare or Fletcher had) with a single company, may have militated against the preservation or publication of manuscripts. Close to twenty of his plays were published during his lifetime; of these, more than half are comedies, with three significant tragedies: Lust's Dominion (presumably identical to The Spanish Moor's Tragedy, written with Day, Marston, and William Haughton, 1600), The Witch of Edmonton (with Ford and Rowley, 1621), and The Virgin Martyr (with Massinger, 1620).

The first phase of Dekker's career is documented in Henslowe's diary. His name appears for the first time in connection with "fayeton" (presumably, Phaeton) in 1598. There follow, before 1599, payments for work on The Triplicity of Cuckolds, The Mad Man's Morris, and Hannibal and Hermes. He worked on these plays with Robert Wilson, Henry Chettle, and Michael Drayton. With Drayton, he also worked on history plays on the French civil wars, Earl Godwin, and others. In 1599, he wrote plays on Troilus and Cressida, Agamemnon (with Chettle), and Page of Plymouth, as well as a play about Robert II in collaboration with Chettle, Jonson, and Marston. All these have been lost.

1599 also saw the production of three plays that have survived. It was during this year that he produced his most famous work, The Shoemaker's Holiday, or the Gentle Craft, categorised by modern critics as citizen comedy. This play reflects his concerns with the daily lives of ordinary Londoners, and contains the poem The Merry Month of May. This play exemplifies his intermingling of everyday subjects with the fantastical, embodied in this case by the rise of a craftsman to Mayor and the involvement of an unnamed but idealised king in the concluding banquet. In the same year he also produced Old Fortunatus and Patient Grissel, the latter on the folkloric theme treated by Chaucer in The Clerk's Tale. At some point before 1600, it is likely he had a hand in the anonymous play The Weakest Goeth to the Wall, which may contain the first instance of stage-Dutch on the Elizabethn stage. In 1600, he worked on The Seven Wise Masters, Fortune's Tennis, Cupid and Psyche, and Fair Constance of Rome. The next year, in addition to Satiromastix, he worked on a play possibly about Sebastian of Portugal and Blurt, Master Constable, on which he may have worked with Thomas Middleton. In 1602 he revised two older plays, Pontius Pilate (1597) and the second part of Sir John Oldcastle. He also collaborated on Caesar's Fall, Jephthah, A Medicine for a Curst Wife, Sir Thomas Wyatt (on Wyatt's rebellion), and Christmas Comes But Once a Year.

Except for Blurt, which was performed by the Blackfriars Children, the earlier of these works were performed at the Admiral's Fortune Theatre. After 1602, Dekker split his attention between pamphlets and plays; thus, his dramatic output decreased considerably. He and Middleton wrote The Honest Whore for the Fortune in 1604, and Dekker wrote a sequel himself the following year. The Middleton/Dekker collaboration The Family of Love also dates from this general era. Dekker and Webster wrote Westward Ho and Northward Ho for Paul's Boys. The failures of the anti-Catholic Whore of Babylon and tragicomic If This Be Not... have already been noted. The Roaring Girl, a city comedy that incorporates the real-life contemporary figure 'Moll Cutpurse', otherwise known as Mary Frith, was a collaboration with Middleton in 1611. In the same year, he also wrote another tragicomedy called Match Me in London.

During his imprisonment, Dekker did not write plays. After his release, he collaborated with Day on Guy of Warwick (1620), The Wonder of a Kingdom (1623), and The Bellman of Paris (1623). With Ford, he wrote The Sun's Darling (1624), The Fairy Knight (1624), and The Bristow Merchant (1624). He also wrote the tragicomedy The Noble Spanish Soldier (1622) and later reworked material from this play into a comedic form to produce The Welsh Ambassador (1623). Another play, The Late Murder of the Son upon the Mother, or Keep the Widow Waking, a dramatization of two recent murders in Whitechapel, occasioned a suit for slander heard in the Star Chamber. That play is lost.

Dekker's plays of the 1620s were staged at the large amphitheatres on the north side of London, most commonly at the Red Bull; only two of his later plays were seen at the more exclusive, indoor Cockpit Theatre, and these two were presumably produced by Christopher Beeston, who operated both the Red Bull and the Cockpit. By the 1620s, the Shoreditch amphitheaters had become deeply identified with the louder and less reputable categories of play-goers, such as apprentices. Dekker's type of play appears to have suited them perfectly. Full of bold action, careless about generic differences, and always (in the end) complementary to the values and beliefs of such audiences, his drama carried some of the vigorous optimism of Elizabethan dramaturgy into the Caroline era.

=== Prose ===
He exhibited a similar vigour in his pamphlets, which span almost his whole writing career, and which treat a great variety of subjects and styles.

Dekker's first spate of pamphleteering began in 1603, perhaps during a period when plague had closed the theaters. His first was The Wonderfull Yeare, a journalistic account of the death of Elizabeth I, accession of James I, and the 1603 plague, that combined a wide variety of literary genres in an attempt to convey the extraordinary events of that year ('wonderful' meaning astonishing, not excellent). It succeeded well enough to prompt two more plague pamphlets, News From Gravesend and The Meeting of Gallants at an Ordinary. The Double PP (1606) is an anti-Catholic tract written in response to the Gunpowder Plot. News From Hell (1606) is an homage to and continuation of Nash's Pierce Penniless. The Seven Deadly Sins of London (1606) is another plague pamphlet.

After 1608, Dekker produced his most popular pamphlets: a series of "cony-catching" pamphlets that described the various tricks and deceits of confidence-men and thieves, including thieves' cant. These pamphlets, which Dekker often updated and reissued, include The Belman of London (1608, now The Bellman of London), Lanthorne and Candle-light, Villainies Discovered by Candlelight, and English Villainies. They owe their form and many of their incidents to similar pamphlets by Robert Greene.

Other pamphlets are journalistic in form and offer vivid pictures of Jacobean London. The Dead Term (1608) describes Westminster during summer vacation. The Guls Horne-Booke (1609, now The Gull's Hornbook) describes the life of city gallants, including a valuable account of behaviour in the London theatres. Work for Armourers (1609) and The Artillery Garden (1616) (the latter in verse) describe aspects of England's military industries. London Look Back (1630) treats 1625, the year of James's death, while Wars, Wars, Wars (1628) describes European turmoil.

As might be expected, Dekker turned his experience in prison to profitable account. Dekker His Dreame (1620) is a long poem describing his despairing confinement; he contributed six prison-based sketches to the sixth edition (1616) of Sir Thomas Overbury's Characters; and he revised Lanthorne and Candlelight to reflect what he had learned in prison.

Dekker's pamphlets, even more than his plays, reveal signs of hasty and careless composition, while also offering precise depictions of everyday life in the Jacobean period.

Dekker's poetry entered into modern popular song (although almost unnoticeably) when some of the lyrics of the poem "Golden Slumbers", from Dekker's play Patient Grissel, were included by Paul McCartney in the Beatles' 1969 song "Golden Slumbers".

== Bibliography ==
- Bednarz, James P. Shakespeare and the Poets' War. New York: Columbia University Press, 2001.
- Bowers, F. – 'The Dramatic Works of Thomas Dekker', In 4 Volumes – Cambridge University Press – 1961
- Chapman, L.S. – 'Thomas Dekker and the Traditions of the English Drama' – Lang – 1985
- Gasper, J. – 'The Dragon and the Dove: The Plays of Thomas Dekker' – Oxford: Clarendon – 1990.
- Gregg, Kate. Thomas Dekker: A Study in Economic and Social Backgrounds. Seattle: University of Washington Press, 1924.
- G.R. Hibbard, ed., Three Elizabethan pamphlets by Robert Greene, Thomas Nash, Thomas Dekker (Folcroft, PA: Folcroft Library Editions, 1972).
- Hunt, Mary. Thomas Dekker: A Study. New York: Columbia University Press, 1911.
- McLuskie, Kathleen. Dekker and Heywood: Professional Dramatists. New York: St. Martin's Press, 1993.
- Wilson, F. P, editor. The Plague Pamphlets of Thomas Dekker. Oxford: Clarendon Press, 1925.
