= The Shoemaker's Holiday =

Elizabethan play by Thomas Dekker

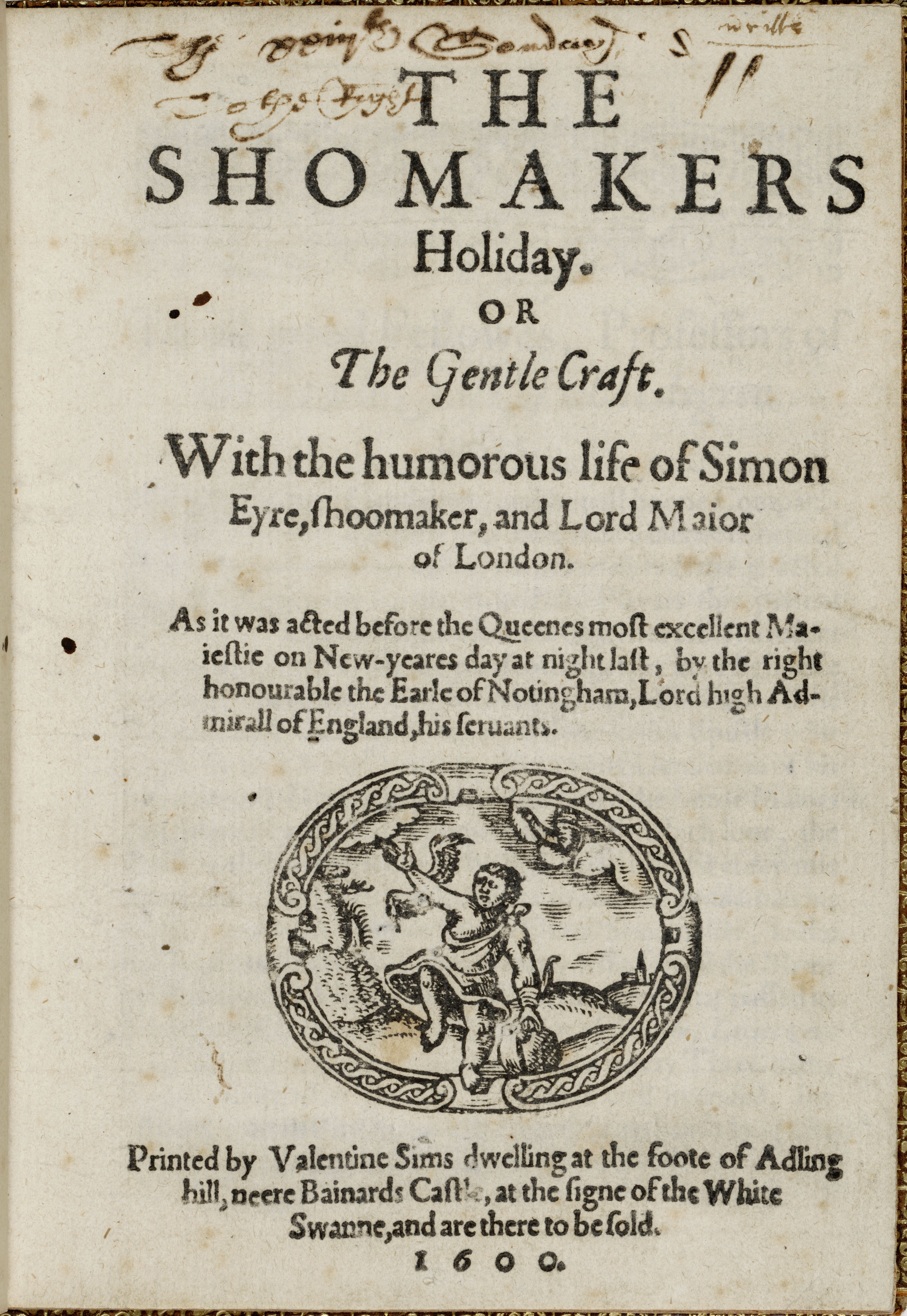
Title page of the first edition, 1600

The Shoemaker's Holiday or the Gentle Craft is an Elizabethan play written by Thomas Dekker. The play was first performed in 1599 by the Admiral's Men, and it falls into the subgenre of city comedy. The story features three subplots: an inter-class romance between a citizen of London and an aristocrat, the ascension of shoemaker Simon Eyre to Lord Mayor of London, and a romance between a gentleman and a shoemaker's wife, whose husband appears to have died in the wars with France.

The play is a "citizen" drama, or a depiction of the life of members of London's livery companies, and it follows in Dekker's style of depicting everyday life in London. The events of the play occur during the reign of King Henry VI, though also hinting at the reign of Henry V. Henry V succeeded his father, Henry IV, as leader of England following Henry IV's death in 1413 at the age of 26. He is best known for securing the French crown and for his depiction in Shakespeare's plays Henry IV, Part 1, Henry IV, Part 2, and Henry V. Dekker uses this correlation in The Shoemaker's Holiday, as an English king appears in scenes 19 and 21; however, he is only identified as "The King" in the speech prefix in the first printed edition of the play.

== Characters ==
- Rowland Lacy: Love interest of Rose Otley. Lacy avoids going to war by taking on the identity of Hans, a Dutch shoemaker.
- Rose Otley: The daughter of Roger Otley and the love interest of Rowland Lacy.
- Sir Roger Otley: The Lord Mayor of London and father of Rose. He attempts to marry Rose to Hammon.
- Sir Hugh Lacy: The Earl of Lincoln and Rowland's uncle. He attempts to have Rowland sent to war.
- Askew: Lacy's cousin.
- Simon Eyre: A master Shoemaker for whom Hans and Ralph work. Eyre is based on the historical figure Simon Eyre (1395–1458) a London merchant and artisan who was elected Lord Mayor in 1445.
- Margery Eyre: The wife of Simon Eyre.
- Roger: Simon Eyre's foreman, known as Hodge.
- Ralph: Simon Eyre's journeyman and husband to Jane. He is drafted into the war.
- A boy: Servant of Simon Eyre.
- Jane: Wife of Ralph. She almost marries Hammon after being falsely informed her husband had died in war.
- Hammon: A wealthy London citizen who attempts to court and wed Jane.
- Warner: Hammon's brother-in-law.
- Scott: A friend of Otley's.
- Sybil: Rose Otley's maid.
- Lovell: A courtier.
- Dutch skipper: A trader and associate of Rowland Lacy who sells his commodities inexpensively to Simon Eyre.
- Dodger: Lincoln's servant.
- Firk: Eyre's journeyman who plays a key role in the union of Rose and Rowland and the reunion of Ralph and Jane.
- The King
- Cornwall

== Synopsis ==
=== Act I ===
Scene 1

Sir Hugh Lacy (Lincoln) and Sir Roger Otley discuss the potential relationship blooming between their charges Rowland Lacy and Rose Otley. The men discuss the class barrier that would be broken by the said relationship. Lincoln discovers the King's plan for Rowland to lead an army in France. Rowland arrives as Otley is leaving.

Lincoln advises Lacy to enter the war in France and leave Rose behind. Lacy agrees, and Lincoln exits. Lacy asks his cousin Askew to go ahead to France without him because he has business in London. Askew agrees, but the two are interrupted by a band of shoemakers led by Simon Eyre.

Eyre and his men ask Lacy to allow Ralph, Eyre's youngest apprentice and a newly conscripted soldier, to be allowed to stay in London with his new bride, Jane. Lacy refuses. Ralph gifts Jane a pair of shoes specifically designed for her and then departs.

=== Act II ===
Scene 1

Rose dreamt of Lacy, her absent love. Rose's maid, Sybil, arrives with news from London: she recognizes Lacy in costume. Rose asks Sybil to ensure that Lacy has embarked for France. Rose promises Sybil expensive clothes for her troubles.

Scene 2

Lacy soliloquizes about his plan to seek a job as a shoemaker so that he can remain in London and see Rose.

Scene 3

Simon Eyre wakes his fellow shoemakers and wife to begin the work day. Lacy, disguised as a Dutch Shoemaker named "Hans", passes the shop singing a Dutch song. One of Eyre's apprentices, Firk, notices Lacy and asks Eyre to hire him. Eyre denies the request, but is met by Hodge, his foreman, and Firk threatening to leave unless their desire is met. Eyre eventually hires Lacy.

Scene 4

Master Hammon and Master Warner, two wealthy men, are hunting deer on the land adjacent to Roger Otley's country house. A boy informs them that their targeted game has left.

Scene 5

Hammon and Warner arrive at Roger Otley's house looking for the deer. Rose and Sybil say they have not seen it, and they have further discussion with the men. Otley arrives and welcomes the hunters. Otley later claims that he intends to marry Hammon to Rose.

=== Act III ===
Scene 1

On behalf of Eyre, "Hans" uses his previous connection with a Dutch skipper to secure the purchase of a valuable cargo. Hodge explains that Eyre stands to make a lot of money when he sells on the cargo. Eyre and his wife Margery arrive at the shoemaker's shop and Margery lambasts the men for not working harder. When Firk and Hodge threaten to quit, Eyre scolds his wife and buys a round of beer to smooth things over. Hodge reveals the plan to buy the cargo and Eyre, getting ahead of himself, dons a velvet coat and alderman's gown. He leaves with the Skipper to complete the deal.

Scene 2

Dodger, Lincoln's servant, finds out that Lacy was staying in England to woo Rose. Dodger is paid by Lincoln to find Lacy.

Scene 3

Hammon attempts to court Rose with Otley's blessing, but she is not receptive to his advances. He then decides to pursue a local shop-girl that he knows. Otley decides to send his daughter back to their country house following this news. This allows him then to do business with Simon Eyre.

Master Scott reveals to Otley that Simon Eyre has made a lot of money on the sale of the Dutch cargo. Otley promises to do business with Eyre.

Dodger arrives and asks Otley if he knows where Lacy might be hiding. Otley is furious to learn that Lacy might be in London and suspects that this explains why Rose rebuffed Hammon's advances.

Scene 4

Margery sends Firk to Guildhall to discover whether Eyre has been made Master Sheriff of London. Afterwards, she asks Hans and Hodge to craft a special pair of shoes for her. She then lists other accessories that she needs, including a wig and fan, despite the criticism of the men surrounding her.

Ralph returns from the war, during which he has injured his leg. The shoemakers welcome him home and commiserate with him. Ralph asks about his wife Jane and learns that she is reputed to be in London.

Scene 5

Otley welcomes Eyre and Margery to his home. Otley asks Margery to counsel Rose on her behavior, and she does so. The shoemakers arrive and perform a morris dance. Rose instantly recognizes Lacy. After the shoemakers leave, Sybil promises Rose that she will devise a plan to marry her mistress to "Hans."

=== Act IV ===
Scene 1

Hammon spies on Jane while she works alone in a clothes shop. He attempts to woo her, but she says she is already married and her husband Ralph is fighting in France. Hammon reveals that he has received word that Ralph is dead. Jane is upset upon hearing this news, prompting Hammon to propose marriage to her. Hammon does not leave until Jane promises that, if she does remarry, it will be to him.

Scene 2

The shoemakers discuss their increasing prosperity. Sybil arrives and requests that "Hans" come to meet with Rose, and they depart.

Scene 3

Hammon's servant visits the shoemakers to order a pair of shoes for his master's bride, since they will be married the next day. He shows Ralph a shoe belonging to the woman and asks him to make a pair of the same dimensions. Ralph recognizes the shoe and realizes that the bride is his own wife, Jane.

The servant leaves and Firk arrives. The shoemakers strategize about how to interrupt Jane's wedding and reunite her with Ralph.

Scene 4

Sybil interrupts Lacy and Rose with news that Otley approaches. Lacy falls back on his disguise and pretends to fit Rose with a shoe. Otley arrives and suspects nothing. A servant brings news that Lincoln is on his way, leaving Lacy just enough time to escape.

Scene 5

Otley and Lincoln discuss how they intend to separate Rose and Lacy. Their plan is to find Lacy and send him to France. Sybil bursts in to reveal that Rose has eloped with a shoemaker. While Otley demands an explanation, Firk arrives with some shoes for Rose. He reveals that Hans and Rose are planning to be married. Lincoln then realizes that Hans must be Lacy and pays Firk to tell him at which church Rose and Hans will be married. Firk gives Lincoln and Otley directions to the church where Hammon will marry Jane.

=== Act V ===
Scene 1

Eyre, who is now the Lord Mayor, sends Rose and Lacy to be married with his blessing. Left alone, Simon soliloquizes about an impending visit from the King, who wishes to see the new market buildings Eyre has constructed. Eyre also looks forward to the holiday feast he is planning.

Scene 2

Ralph, Hodge, and Firk approach Hammon and Jane on their way to be wed. Hodge and Firk berate Jane and then reveal that their companion is none other than Jane's husband, Ralph. Jane is elated and chooses to return to Ralph. Hammon offers money to Ralph for Jane's hand in marriage and is met with outrage.

Lincoln and Otley arrive to stop the wedding, thinking Jane and Ralph are Rose and Lacy in disguise. As soon as they learn their mistake, Dodger arrives with news that Rose and Lacy are married and that Eyre intends to beg the King that Lacy be pardoned for his crimes.

The church bells ring to begin the holiday and the shoemakers rejoice.

Scene 3

The King travels towards Simon Eyre's feast and looks forward to meeting the new Lord Mayor.

Scene 4

Eyre's men serve a feast to the apprentices of London. Margery reports that the King is on his way. Lacy asks Eyre to advocate for him with the King. Margery warns Eyre to speak politely to the King, and Eyre berates her.

Scene 5

The King states that he is disappointed in Lacy, yet he pardons Lacy's crimes. The King also meets the shoemakers and is amused by Simon Eyre. Lincoln arrives and asks for the King to intervene. The King reports that he has already pardoned Lacy. Lincoln and Otley ask the King to annul Lacy and Rose's marriage. The King does so, then promptly remarries them. He knights Lacy, names Eyre's new building "The Leaden Hall", and grants Eyre's request that the sale of leather at the market be permitted two days per week. Eyre invites the King to partake of his banquet. The King agrees.

== Date and text ==
There are five surviving editions of the play printed during Dekker's lifetime. The first edition was published in 1600 by the printer, Valentine Simmes, after having been performed for the Queen on New Year's Day, 1600. This first edition includes a prologue that was performed before Elizabeth I. This prologue does not feature in the other five editions printed 1599 to 1657.

The diary of theatrical impresario Philip Henslowe records a payment of £3 to "Thomas Dickers" for the play. Dekker was a regular contributor to the repertory of the Admiral's Men, Henslowe's company.

== Thomas Dekker's sources ==
=== The Gentle Craft ===
Dekker's chief source was Thomas Deloney's The Gentle Craft, a work of prose fiction. Deloney focuses on the perspective of guildsmen, the working class of that time. Deloney's influence on Dekker's work is impossible to overlook considering that two of the three interwoven plots of The Gentle Craft are found within The Shoemaker's Holiday. The story of Simon Eyre, the shoemaker-become-Lord-Mayor, as well as that of Crispine and Crispianus provided direct narrative inspiration for Dekker's plotlines of Simon Eyre and that of Rose and Lacy, respectively. Deloney's narrative follows the two lovers as they are separated by class and fear, and with Crispine ultimately disguising himself as a shoemaker. Dekker's play does the same, with additions including characters who disapprove of the relationship.

=== The myth of Simon Eyre ===
The character of Simon Eyre is based upon a historical figure of the same name. Simon Eyre was not, in fact, a shoemaker, but rather a draper and a merchant, acting as a distributor of foreign goods throughout London. After accumulating a modest fortune, he was elected Sheriff of London, mobilizing his involvement in numerous civic projects, including service as both a councilman and as an alderman of multiple wards. He was eventually elected Lord Mayor of London in 1445, while Henry VI was king.

Thomas Deloney reinvents Eyre as a draper and a shoemaker, Dekker portrays Eyre exclusively as a shoemaker. Scholars hold that Dekker's reasoning for portraying Eyre as a shoemaker lies in the desire to romanticize an already-popular urban myth of the time by combining the historical and the stuff of legend. Dekker's version of the character is humorous and "colorful."

=== Additional sources ===
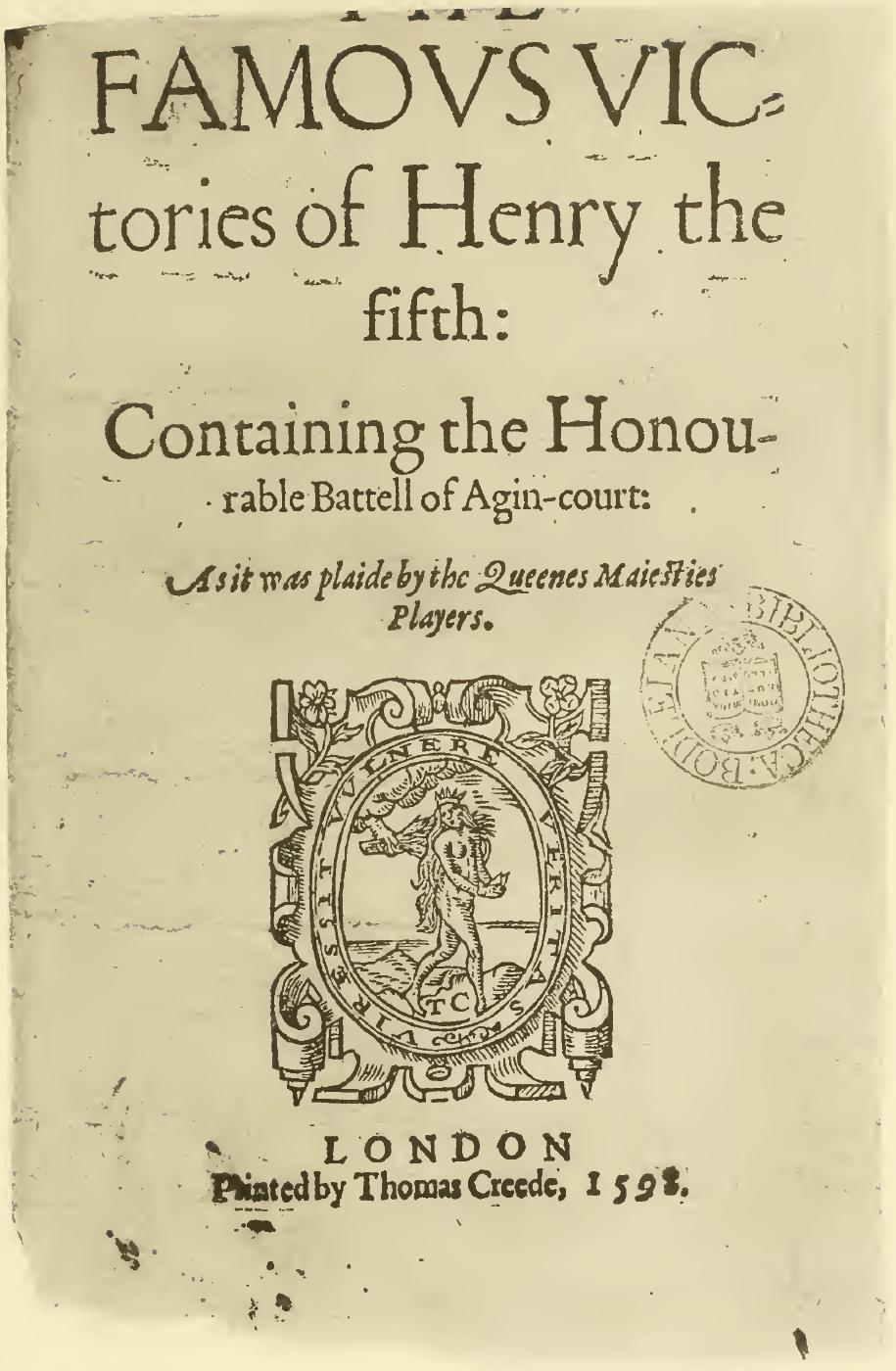
Title page of The Famous Victories of Henry the Fifth

Another possible source that Dekker used when writing The Shoemaker's Holiday, is the anonymous play The Famous Victories of Henry the Fifth, first performed during the 1580s. Scholar W.L. Halstead asserts that Dekker most likely drew from The Famous Victories of Henry the Fifth when writing The Shoemaker's Holiday, because of the similarities found between each plays impressment scenes.

Dekker also used John Stow's A Survey of London as a source of details about London including Eyre's patronage of Leadenhall.

== Themes ==
=== Social class ===
Social class tensions are a key aspect of life within Dekker's play. The relationship between Rose and Rowland is an example of this. Hugh Lacy, Rowland's uncle, will not allow the two to be married, despite their obvious feelings for each other. Social class affects other relationships in the play as well, particularly Ralph and Jane. As Ralph is of a lower social class, he is unable to avoid inscription into the army, and he is injured fighting in the war.

The presentation of class is also a key point. The lower artisan class is raised to be the centerpiece of the play. Artisans are positioned to be more deserving of attention and are depicted as the true strength in society. With this, the functions and bodily motions of the shoemakers are presented as symbols of health and vitality rather than low or common motions. This is particularly evident in the Morris dance that they perform.

Simon Eyre rises from a shoemaker, to the Lord Mayor of London. This rise in social status is a key event to follow within the play. The trend of social mobility is further explored in the theme Fashion.

=== Fashion ===
Clothing style is a strong indicator of status. For example, the shoes that Ralph gives to Jane as a farewell gift are a vain attempt to ensure her faithfulness in his absence. The shoes themselves are stylish and impractical. They are described as being heavily pinked and are meant to indicate indoor use, and in turn represent Jane's movement from artisan class to a genteel class. Jane's shoes give her the appearance of an upper-class woman; this symbolism is furthered by Hammon's interest in Jane, as well as his hand in her transformation. Jane's shoes symbolize both Ralph's devotion to her and skill in shoemaking, but they also open the door for Hammon's intrusion. The transfer in class that comes with a change in attire is presented also by Simon Eyre, his wife, and their company: "See here, my Maggy, a chain, a gold chain for Simon Eyre. I shall make thee a lady – here's a French hood for thee" (Act 1, Scene 10, Lines 129-30).

=== Gender ===
Gender and sexism are prevalent themes in The Shoemaker's Holiday. Margery endures constant verbal abuse, even though she is arguably contributing the most to the family business and to ensuring its success. From the beginning, Margery frowns on hiring Lacy, proposes to replace the workers who threaten to quit, does not want the staff to take off for the holiday, and supports her husband's rise to sheriff and then mayor. While being verbally abused and pushed out of most of the discussion, she is silenced and banished from the business deal with the Dutch merchant. Margery is reduced to the female stereotype of "the talkative woman", yet she is an important influence over the shoemakers' economy.

Jane, who must work to survive in her husband's absence, is also subject to sexism. Hammon attempts to exploit her vulnerability, asking her, "How sell you this hand?" Later when Jane's husband Ralph returns, Hammon again tries to buy Jane off, this time from Ralph himself: "dost thou think a shoemaker is so base to be bawd to his own wife for commodity? Take thy gold and choke with it! Were I not lame, I would make thee eat thy words."

=== Commerce ===
The various transactions and business interactions in the play reveal an early capitalist culture in which gains are made at the expense of others. Business transactions give way to social interactions depicting social mobility and the economy of love.

In Act 3 Scene 1, Eyre's purchase of the heavily discounted cargo from the Dutch skipper reveal the theme of insider capitalism. Eyre is able to purchase the cargo at a bargain because of "the love he [the shipowner] bears to Hans." However, acknowledging the historical context reveals other motivations. Towards the end of the 16th century London suffered sharp increases in food and rent prices which drastically increased the citywide proportion of poverty. Meanwhile, immigrant populations rose which created significant tension. Specifically, the Dutch were seen as a threat to the "whole commercial and maritime sector of the English economy." These circumstances imply that "[w]ealth is a fixed pie; an increase in one's position depends upon the diminution of another's." Eyre prioritizes honest dealing in order to foster a longer-term trade relationship, but he also seeks to maximize gain. This calculated investment decision is a "triumph of capitalist enterprise."

Act 3 Scene 1 also reveals the inherent link between capital and class. The profit from this venture increases Eyre's wealth substantially, which "enables Eyre to expand his social network", or in other words, "buys him the social capital that will allow him to be appointed alderman and later Lord Mayor of London".

Furthermore, there are two attempts at exchanging money for love that each speak on the commercial culture and the general power of capital. The first is seen in Act 1 Line 76, as Lord Mayor Roger Otley gifts Rowland Lacy 20 pounds to forgo his love/separate from Rose. This gesture stems from cultural expectations concerning "gift-giving and hospitality in order to craft connections to noblemen and gentlemen who were then obliged to reciprocate with tangible benefits such as economic aid and protection." Otley's previous gifts include hosting feasts and financing wars, and his gift to Lacy is in a similar vein. This demonstrates that the Lord Mayor believes that "emotions can be purchased or compensated in a commercial exchange,".

The second attempt to exchange money for love comes in Act 5 Scene 2 and highlights a status distinction. Hammon attempts to pay Ralph 20 pounds in order to claim Jane for himself. Hammon, like Otley, operates under the assumption that money can buy anything, even love, and approaches Jane not as a person but as a commodity. This can be contrasted with Ralph's position: "Dost thou think a shoemaker is so base to be a bawd to his own wife for commodity?"

=== Wartime and disability ===
The male artisan body is prominent in the play, with many descriptions of male hunger, thirst, sexual activity, and, most prominently, labor. The labor and strength of the male artisan body, which is "generally written as 'low' in early modern discourses", here stands in for the strength of the nation as a whole. Emphasis of the male body is one way the play valorizes artisanship. The character of Ralph in the play, a shoemaker who returns from the war disabled, contributes to the uniquely artisan conception of the body in the play. As an artisan, Ralph's body is his livelihood. Ralph's disability, although it does literally hinder his ability to work, is not viewed as a hindrance by his community, which values labor in and of itself. Because of this conception of labor and the body, Ralph's disability does not exclude him from his fellow artisans, as evidenced by Hodge's encouragement of him after he says he "wants limbs." It is instead viewed as an opportunity to be supported by his community and to take comfort in labor.

A constant undercurrent in the play is the war between England and France. Each character's view of the war is a 'litmus test' of his or her personality. Lincoln and Otley, for example, use the war as an excuse to break up Rose and Lacy, demonstrating their opportunistic qualities. Simon Eyre dislikes war but supports his country's participation in it strongly, accentuating his role as a stand-in for the common citizen. Each of these reactions reveals the war in France underpins the many conflicts of the play, "uniting them under a common metaphor."

== Criticism ==
=== Work and class structure criticism ===
Scholars have approached the idea of class and class disparity in The Shoemaker's Holiday. An academic debate is still active as to whether Dekker's play maintains or dissents against the class structure of early modern Britain. In her essay Work, Bodies, and Gender in The Shoemaker's Holiday, Ronda Arab claims that Eyre's rise in social status does not compromise his "artisanal identity." She claims that Eyre's multiple identities challenge the hierarchal class structures of early modern English societies. Arab also suggests that Eyre's method of gaining political power reveals a class disparity and dependence upon economic "borrowing privileges" of the aristocratic class. Bartolovich, in Mythos of Labor: The Shoemaker's Holiday and the Origin of Citizen History also acknowledges the complex relationship between the classes in The Shoemaker's Holiday, suggesting that the differences between citizen and noble life are not dichotomous.

=== Feminist criticism ===
Scholars have argued that the physical work of women in The Shoemaker's Holiday is undervalued compared to the labor of their husbands. Ann Christensen notes that the work done by Margery Eyre in the play is disregarded as inconsequential and stripped of political significance. Christensen also argues that Dekker and other early modern dramatists of city comedies often portray tradesmen's wives as "crafty, skilled and profit-minded", embodying the negative aspects of capitalism.

Amy L. Smith describes cross-class marriages in The Shoemaker's Holiday as a means of attaining agency through "conflicting investments". She argues that female characters are able to use the conservative social institution of marriage to their advantage. For instance, Rose reshapes the conventions of courtship "so that she is more than a pawn between two men seeking to use her marriage to advance or maintain their own status."

=== Criticism on English identity ===
Christopher L. Morrow has suggested that The Shoemaker's Holiday constructs England's national identity through a culture of corporate community. Morrow argues that Thomas Dekker's vision of a "corporate nationalism" is more "open, tolerant and fair" than "monarchic nationalism" in Shakespeare's Henry V. He suggests that one pursuit of The Shoemaker's Holiday is to "renegotiate the boundaries of a nation", shifting from one that is defined by individual needs to one that is defined by corporate communal inclusion.

Andrew Fleck takes up the theme of English identity in The Shoemaker's Holiday by focusing on the presence of a foreign identity. Fleck notes that The Shoemaker's Holiday, like other comedies of the late Elizabethan period, celebrates "... the traits of English subjects living in London, often at the expense of foreigners." Fleck argues that the conclusion of the play, with the marriage of Lacy and Rose, implies that aristocrats may unite with citizens to "prepar[e] the way for a unified England to face a foreign enemy".

== Performance history ==
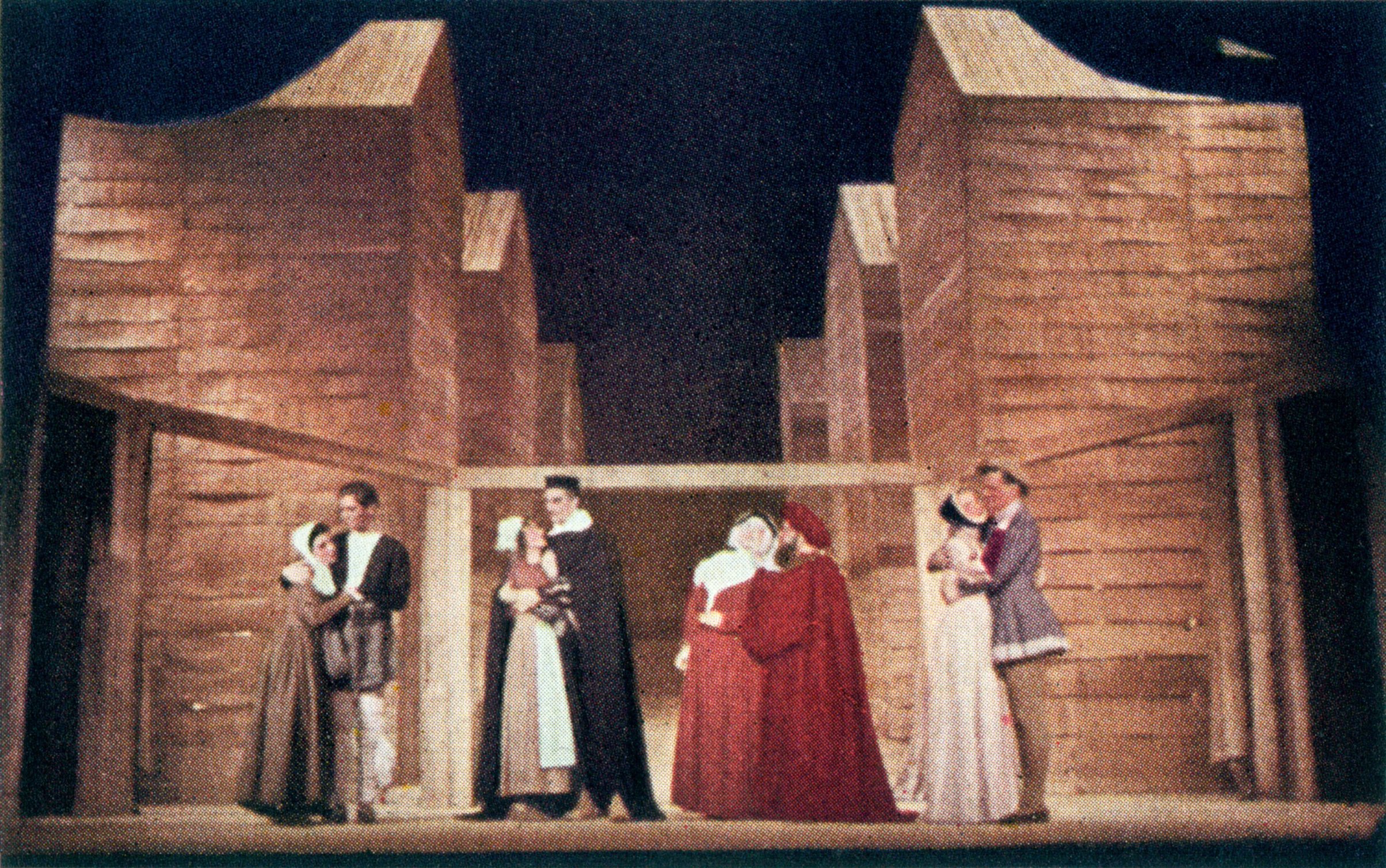
Stage production of The Shoemaker's Holiday in 1938

Scholars believe the Admiral's Men first performed The Shoemaker's Holiday in 1599 at The Rose theatre and then later in 1600. During Dekker's lifetime, the only surviving performance record of The Shoemaker's Holiday is in 1600 on New Year's Day as part of Queen Elizabeth I's annual Christmas celebrations and entertainment.

In April 1898, a Harvard University fraternity performed an abridged version with attention to costuming, music, and dance.

In November 1912, at Brinkerhoff Theatre, the Philolexian Society of Columbia University presented a well-received parodic interpretation with an all male-cast performing men's and women's roles.

In January 1938, Orson Welles brought significant attention to The Shoemaker's Holiday with his abridged version in the Mercury Theatre in New York. Some critics gave the production highly favorable reviews while others criticized the extreme humor. Welles' production of The Shoemaker's Holiday was offered "in repertory" with his previous show, Julius Caesar.

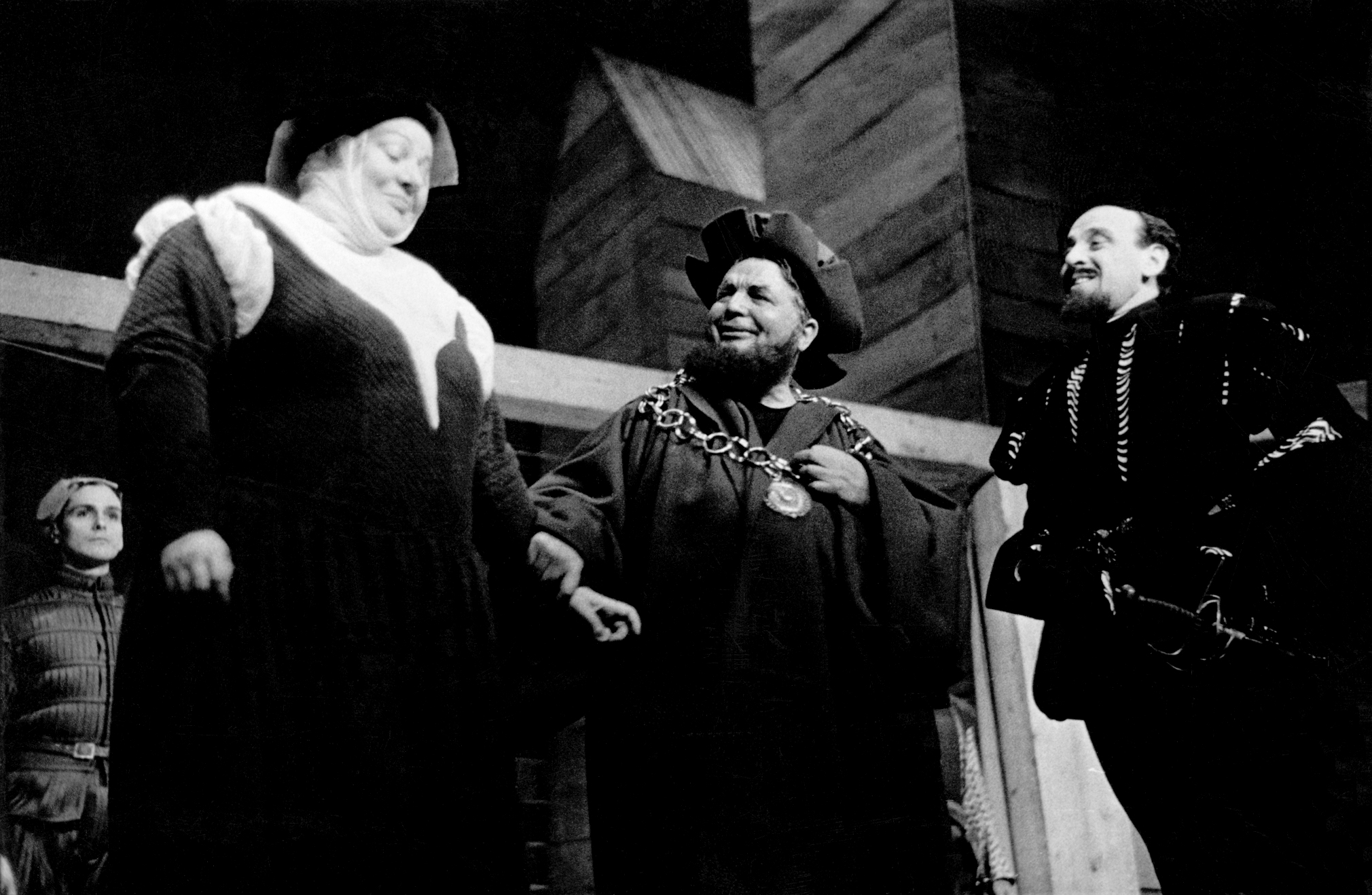
Marian Warring-Manley as Margery, Whitford Kane as Simon Eyre, and George Coulouris as the King in the Mercury Theatre production of The Shoemaker's Holiday (1938)

In 1967, Director Douglas Campbell of the Guthrie Theater in Minneapolis, Minnesota presented an adaptation with an instrumental score composed by Dominick Argento. Campbell inserted an extra scene of Ralph singing "How Does My Jane?"

In 1970, the play was translated by Dan Almagor into Hebrew and directed by David William to celebrate the rebuilding of the Habima Theatre.

The Shoemaker's Holiday has also been a part of Shakespearean festivals celebrating Elizabethan theatre.

In February 2005, Peter Dobbins as artistic director of Storm Theatre presented a performance in contrast to Welles' comedic abridgment. The Wall Street Journal favorably reviewed the production for both its comedic and somber moments.

In 2015, the Royal Shakespeare Company produced The Shoemaker's Holiday at the Swan Theatre, Stratford-upon-Avon to highly acclaimed reviews. Critics praised director Phillip Breen for reinterpreting scenes and evoking contemporary issues of war trauma and oppression.

In 2016, the Baltimore Shakespeare Factory produced the play with modern music such as "Blue Suede Shoes" by Elvis Presley. Reviewers described the show as a light-hearted, comedic interpretation with exceptional costuming.

=== Other media forms ===
A BBC World Theatre Radio play adaptation was aired in the early 1960s.

In 1967, there was a short-lived musical version.

In December 1974, CUNY's Queens College presented a drama and dance ballad opera adaptation by lyricist John Olon and with music by Argento.

In April 2015, Willing Suspension Productions, Boston University's Renaissance theater group, performed and filmed a freely viewable performance.
