= 1598 in literature =

This article contains information about the literary events and publications of 1598.

== Events ==
- Before September – A second edition of Love's Labour's Lost appears in London as the first known printing of a Shakespeare play to have his name on the title page ("Newly corrected and augmented by W. Shakespere").
- February 23 – Thomas Bodley refounds the Bodleian Library at the University of Oxford.
- March 28 – Philip Henslowe contracts Edward Alleyn and Thomas Heywood to act for the Admiral's Men in London for two years.
- April 30 – A comedy, by an anonymous playwright about an expedition of soldiers, is the very first theatrical performance in North America, staged near El Paso for Spanish colonists.
- May 3 – The Spanish playwright Lope de Vega marries for the second time, to Juana de Guardo.
- c. May – The premiėre of William Haughton's Englishmen for My Money, or, A Woman Will Have Her Will introduces what is seen as the first city comedy, probably by the Admiral's Men at London's Rose Theatre.
- c. July/September – Ben Jonson's comedy of humours Every Man in His Humour is probably first performed, by the Lord Chamberlain's Men at the Curtain Theatre, London, perhaps with Shakespeare playing Kno'well.
- September 7 – Francis Meres' Palladis Tamia, Wits Treasury is registered for publication, including the first list and critical discussion of Shakespeare's works; he also mentions that Shakespeare's "sugar'd sonnets" are circulating privately.
- September 22 – Ben Jonson kills actor Gabriel Spenser in a duel in London and is briefly held in Newgate Prison, but escapes capital punishment by pleading benefit of clergy.
- October – Edmund Spenser's castle, Kilcolman Castle near Doneraile in Ireland, is burned down by native forces under Hugh O'Neill, Earl of Tyrone. Spenser leaves for London shortly after.
- November 25 – Henry Chettle is paid for "mending" a play about Robin Hood to make it suitable for performance at court.
- December 28 – London's The Theatre is dismantled.
- unknown dates
  - Lancelot Andrewes turns down the bishoprics of Ely and Salisbury.
  - The English poet Barnabe Barnes is prosecuted in the Star Chamber for attempted murder of one John Browne, first by offering him a poisoned lemon and then by sweetening his wine with sugar laced with mercury sublimate; Browne survives both attempts.
  - John Marston's The Metamorphosis of Pigmalion's Image and Certaine Satyres begins a trend in English satirical writing that leads to official suppression in the following year.

== New books ==
=== Prose ===
- John Florio – A World of Words, Italian/English dictionary, the first dictionary published in England to use quotations ("illustrations") for meaning to the words
- Emanuel Ford – Parismus, the Renowned Prince of Bohemia (first part)
- King James VI of Scotland – The True Law of Free Monarchies
- Francis Meres – Palladis Tamia
- Merkelis Petkevičius – Polski z litewskim katechism
- John Stow – Survey of London
- Zhao Shizhen – Shenqipu (3rd century, possible first publication)
- Lucas Janszoon Waghenaer – Enchuyser zeecaertboeck (Enkhuizen book of sea charts)

=== Drama ===
- Anonymous
  - The Famous Victories of Henry V earliest known publication
  - Mucedorus published
  - The Pilgrimage to Parnassus (earliest possible date of composition)
- Jakob Ayrer
  - Von der Erbauung Roms (The Building of Rome)
  - Von der schönen Melusina (Fair Melusina)
- Samuel Brandon – Virtuous Octavia
- Henry Chettle, Henry Porter and Ben Jonson – Hot Anger Soon Cold
- Robert Greene – The Scottish History of James IV published
- William Haughton – Englishmen for My Money
- Ben Jonson – Every Man in His Humour
- Anthony Munday – The Downfall of Robert Earl of Huntingdon
- Anthony Munday (and Henry Chettle?) – The Death of Robert Earl of Huntingdon
- Henry Porter – Love Prevented
- William Shakespeare
  - Henry IV, Part 1 (published)
  - Love's Labour's Lost (published)

=== Poetry ===
- Richard Barnfield
  - The Encomium of Lady Pecunia
  - Poems in Divers Humours
- George Chapman – translation of Homer's Iliad into English
- Lope de Vega – La Arcadia and La Dragontea
- Christopher Marlowe – Hero and Leander (completed by Chapman following Marlowe's death)
- John Marston – The Metamorphosis of Pigmalian's Image and The Scourge of Villanie

== Births ==
- March 12 – Guillaume Colletet, French writer (died 1659)
- March 13 – Johannes Loccenius, German historian (died 1677)
- July 29 – Henricus Regius, Dutch philosopher and correspondent of René Descartes (died 1679)
- August 7 – Georg Stiernhielm, Swedish poet (died 1672)
- unknown date – Johann George Moeresius, German poet (died 1657)

== Deaths ==
- January 2 - Morris Kyffin, Welsh soldier and author (born c.1555)
- January 9 – Jasper Heywood, English translator (born 1535)
- February 27 – Friedrich Dedekind, German theologian (born 1524)
- April 10 – Jacopo Mazzoni, Italian philosopher (born 1548)
- August – Alexander Montgomerie, outlawed Scottish poet (born c. 1545/1550)
- December 6 – Paolo Paruta, Venetian historian (born 1540)
- December 15 – Philips van Marnix, lord of Sint-Aldegonde, Dutch statesman and author (born 1540)
- December 31 – Heinrich Rantzau, German humanist writer (born 1526)
- unknown date – David Powel, Welsh historian who popularised continuing legends such as that of Prince Madoc (born c. 1549)
