= Anthony Munday =

English playwright (c.1560 - 1633)

Anthony Munday (or Monday) (1560? – 10 August 1633) was an English playwright and miscellaneous writer. He was baptised on 13 October 1560 in St Gregory by St Paul's, London, and was the son of Christopher Munday, a stationer, and Jane Munday. He was one of the chief predecessors of Shakespeare in English dramatic composition, and wrote plays about Robin Hood. He is believed to be the primary author of Sir Thomas More, on which he is believed to have collaborated with Henry Chettle, Thomas Heywood, William Shakespeare and Thomas Dekker.

== Biography ==
Munday was once thought to have been born in 1553, because the monument to him in the church of St Stephen Coleman Street, since destroyed, stated that at the time of his death, he was eighty years old. From the inscription we likewise learn that he was "a citizen and draper". In 1589 he was living in the city, and dates his translation of The History of Palmendos "from my house in Cripplegate". That he carried on the business of a draper or had some connection with the trade as late as 1613, may be gathered from the following passage at the close of The Triumphs of Truth, the city pageant for that year, by Thomas Middleton: "The fire-work being made by Maister Humphrey Nichols, a man excellent in his art; and the whole work and body of the Triumph, with all the proper beauties of the workmanship, most artfully and faithfully performed by John Grinkin; and those furnished with apparel and porters by Anthony Munday, Gentleman." The style of "gentleman" was probably given to him with reference to the productions of his pen.

=== Early years ===
He probably already had appeared on the stage as an actor when he was bound apprenticed in 1576 for eight years to the stationer John Allde, an apprenticeship from which he was soon released. By 1578 he was in Rome. In the opening lines of his English Romayne Lyfe (1582), he states that he went abroad solely in order to see strange countries and to learn foreign languages; but he may have been a spy sent to report on the Jesuit English College in Rome or a journalist intent on making literary capital out of the designs of the English Catholics then living in France and Italy. He writes that he and his companion, Thomas Nowell, were robbed of all their possessions on the road from Boulogne to Amiens, where they were helped by an English priest who entrusted them with letters to be delivered in Reims. These they handed over to the English ambassador in Paris. Under a false name, as the son of a well-known English Catholic, Munday gained recommendations which secured his reception at the English College in Rome. He was treated with special kindness by the rector, Dr Morris, for the sake of his supposed father. He gives a detailed account of the routine of the place, of the dispute between the English and Welsh students, of the carnival at Rome, and finally of the martyrdom of Richard Atkins.

=== The playwriting years ===
His political services against the Catholics were rewarded in 1584 by the post of messenger to her Majesty's chamber, and from this time he seems to have given up acting. In 1598–1599, when he travelled with the Earl of Pembroke's men in the Low Countries, it was in the capacity of playwright to rewrite old plays. He devoted 'himself to writing for the booksellers and the theatres, compiling religious works, translating Amadis de Gaule and other French [sic] romances, and putting words to popular airs.

He was the chief pageant writer for the City from 1605 to 1616. These works included London's Love to Prince Henry (1610), his publication describing the city's pageant on the Thames for the investiture of Prince Henry as Prince of Wales in May 1610. One of the more gorgeous Lord Mayor's shows was that of 1616, which was devised by Munday. It is also possible that he supplied most of the pageants between 1592 and 1605, of which no authentic record has been kept.

== His works ==
At what date he acquired the title of "poet to the city" is not known; he had certainly been previously employed in a similar capacity, as Ben Jonson introduces him in that capacity in The Case is Altered, which was written in 1598 or 1599. He pours ridicule upon Don Antonio Balladino (as he calls Munday)—though Munday has also been put forward as a possible part-author of Jonson's play. Thomas Middleton mentions him in his The Triumphs of Truth.

Munday was a prolific author in verse and prose, original and translated, and may be counted among the predecessors of Shakespeare in dramatic composition. One of his earliest works was The Mirror of Mutability, from 1579: he dedicated it to his long-time patron Edward de Vere, 17th Earl of Oxford, and perhaps then belonged to the Earl's company of players, to which he had again attached himself on his return from Italy. Munday's Banquet of Dainty Conceits was printed in 1588.

Nearly all the existing information respecting Anthony Munday's dramatic works is derived from Philip Henslowe's papers. At what period he began to write for the stage cannot be ascertained: the earliest date in these manuscripts connected with his name is December 1597, but he may have been a member of the Earl of Oxford's theatrical company before he went to Rome prior to 1578. In the old catalogues, and in Gerard Langbaine's Momus Triumphans, 1688, a piece called Fidele and Fortunatus is mentioned, and such a play was entered at Stationers' Hall on 12 November 1584. There is little doubt that this is the same production, two copies of which have been discovered, with the running title of Two Italian Gentlemen, that being the second title to Fidele and Fortunatus in the Register. Both copies are without title pages; but to one of them is prefixed a dedication signed A. M., and we may with tolerable certainty conclude that Anthony Munday was the author or translator of it, and that it was printed about the date of its entry on the Stationers' Books.

Munday wrote two plays on the life of Robin Hood, The Downfall and The Death of Robert Earl of Huntington, first mentioned in the Rose theatre records in 1597–8 and published in 1601.

=== Catalogue of plays ===
The subsequent catalogue of plays which Munday wrote, either alone or in conjunction with others, is derived from the materials supplied by Edmond Malone.

- Fidele and Fortunio or Fedele and Fortuna, by Anthony Munday. c. 1584.
- Sir Thomas More, by Anthony Munday, Henry Chettle, Thomas Heywood, William Shakespeare, Thomas Dekker, c. 1591–3.
- Mother Redcap, by Anthony Munday and Michael Drayton. December 1597. Not printed and therefore did not survive.
- The Downfall of Robert Earl of Huntington, by Anthony Munday. February 1597–8. Printed in 1601.
- The Death of Robert Earl of Huntington, by Anthony Munday and Henry Chettle. February 1597–8. Printed in 1601.
- The Funeral of Richard Cordelion, by Robert Wilson, Henry Chettle, Anthony Munday, and Michael Drayton. May 1598. Not printed.
- Valentine and Orson, by Richard Hathwaye and Anthony Munday. July 1598. Not printed.
- Chance Medley, by Robert Wilson, Anthony Munday, Michael Drayton, and Thomas Dekker. August 1598. Not printed.
- Owen Tudor, by Michael Drayton, Richard Hathwaye, Anthony Munday, and Robert Wilson. January 1599 – 1600. Not printed.
- Fair Constance of Rome, by Anthony Munday, Richard Hathwaye, Michael Drayton, and Thomas Dekker. June 1600. Not printed.
- Fair Constance of Rome, Part II., by the same authors. June 1600. Not printed.
- The Rising of Cardinal Wolsey, [154] by Anthony Munday, Michael Drayton, Henry Chettle, and Wentworth Smith. 12 November 1601. Not printed.
- Two Harpies, by Thomas Dekker, Michael Drayton, Thomas Middleton, John Webster, and Anthony Munday. May 1602. Not printed.
- The Widow's Charm, by Anthony Munday. July 1602. Printed in 1607, as Malone conjectured, under the title of The Puritan or Widow of Watling Street, and ascribed to Shakespeare.
- The Set at Tennis, by Anthony Munday. December 1602. Not printed.
- The first part of the Life of Sir John Oldcastle, by Anthony Munday, Michael Drayton, Robert Wilson, and Richard Hathwaye; printed anonymously in 1600 (Q1), and again in 1619 (Q2) under the name of William Shakespeare.
- London's love, to the Royal Prince Henrie meeting him on the river of Thames, at his returne from Richmonde, with a worthie fleete of her citizens, on Thursday the last of May (London, 1610).

=== Translations ===
- Palmerin D'Oliva (1588)
- Francisco de Morais's The honorable, pleasant and rare conceited historie of Palmendos (1589)
- Etienne de Maisonneuf's Gerileon of England (1592)
- The Defence of Contraries. Paradoxes against Common Opinion, Debated in Forme of Declamations in Place of Publike Censure (1593), a translation of Charles Estienne's Paradoxes, ce sont propos contre la commune opinion (1553)
- The anonymous Primaleon of Greece (from 1594)
- Amadis de Gaul (from 1596)
- Francisco de Morais's Palmerin of England (from 1596)
- The Dumbe Diuine Speaker by Giacomo Affinati d'Acuto Romano (1605)

=== Contemporary reception ===
The earliest praise of Munday is contained in William Webbe's "Discourse of English Poetrie", 1586, where his "Sweete Sobs of Sheepheardes and Nymphes" is especially pointed out as "very rare poetrie." Francis Meres, in 1598 ("Palladis Tamia," fo. 283, b.), enumerating many of the best dramatic poets of his day, including Shakespeare, Heywood, Chapman, Porter, Lodge, etc., gives Anthony Munday the praise of being "our best plotter".
