= The Downfall and The Death of Robert Earl of Huntington =

Two closely related Elizabethan-era stage plays

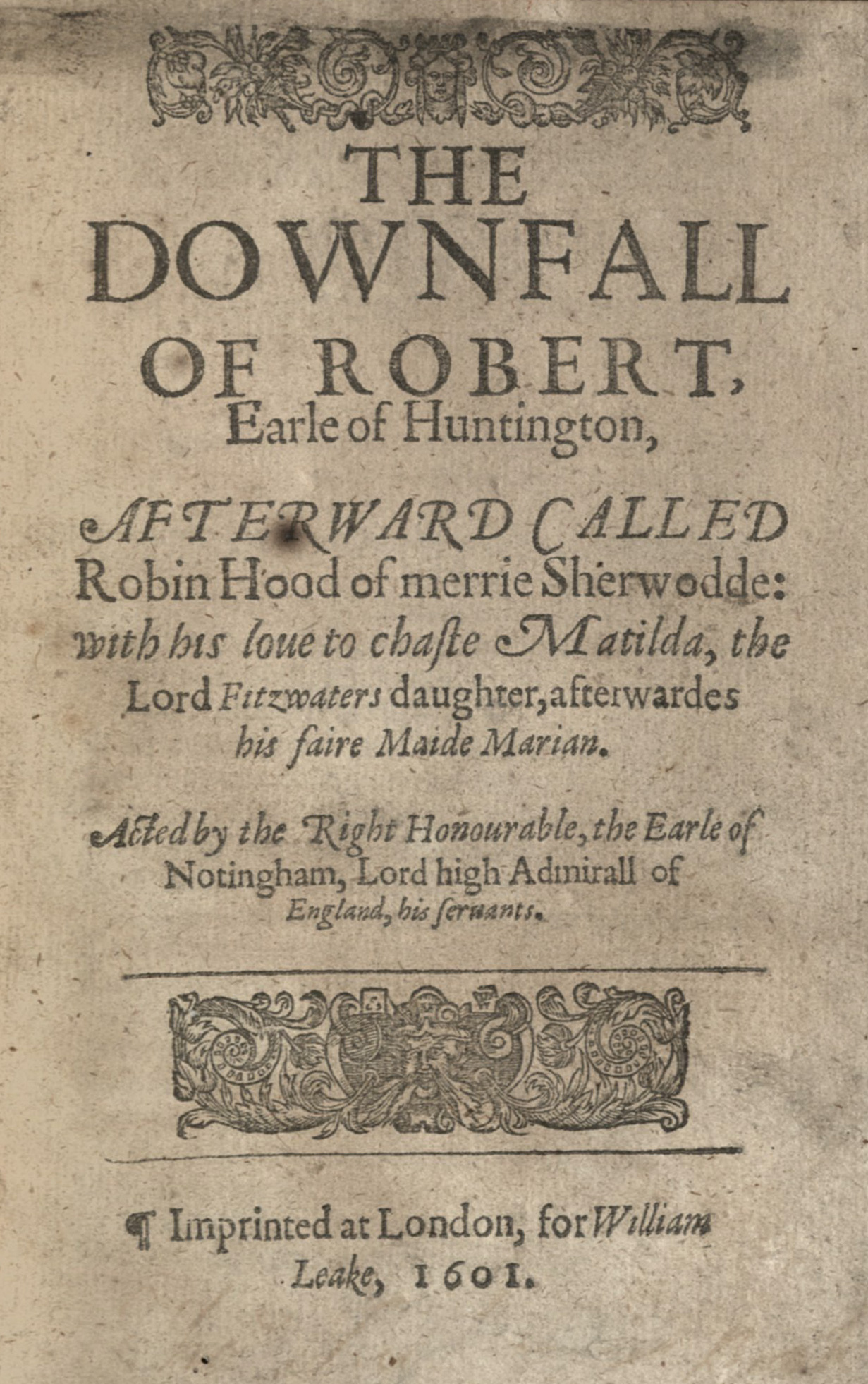
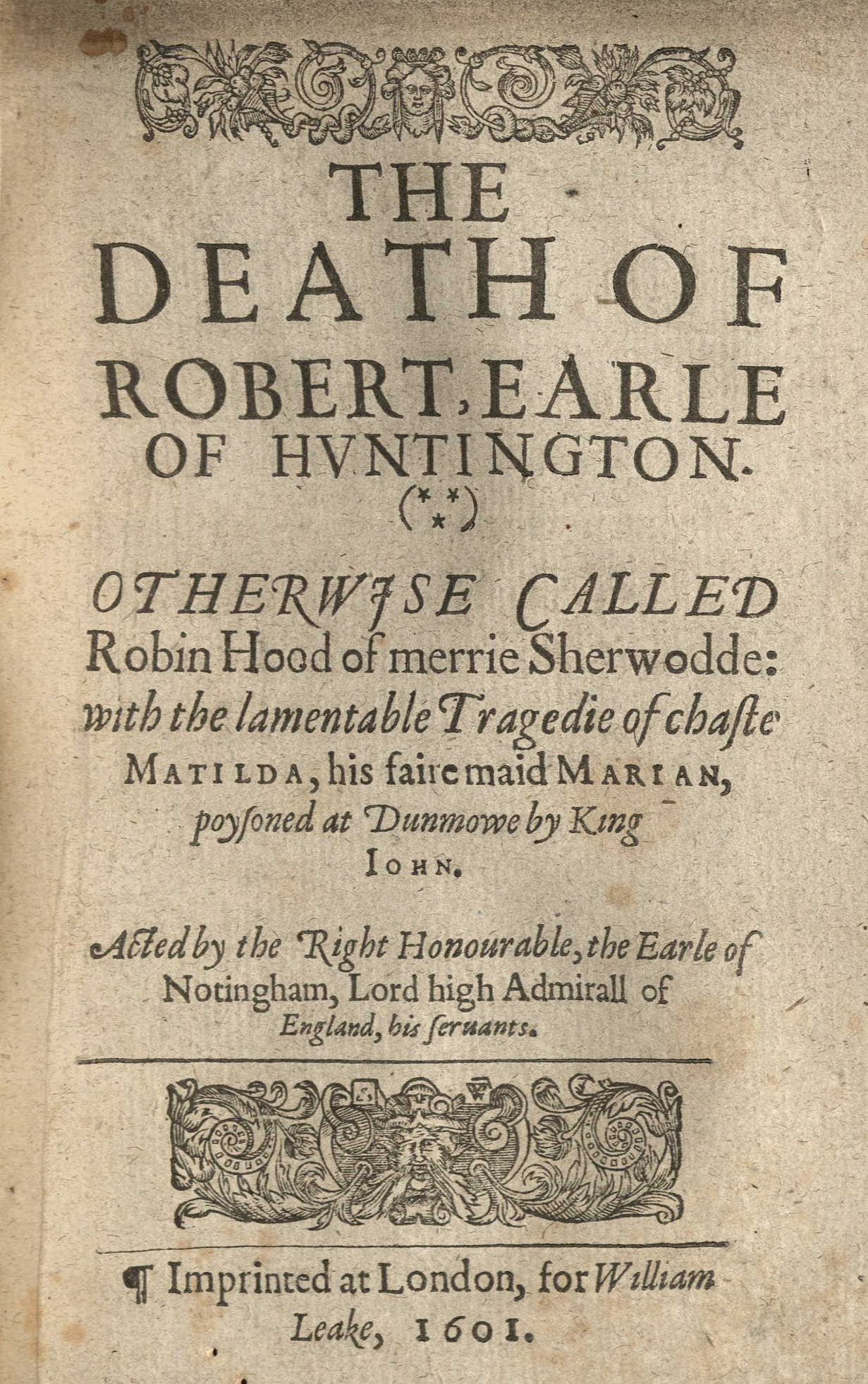
Title pages of the first editions of The Downfall of Robert, Earl of Huntington and The Death of Robert, Earl of Huntington (1601)

The Downfall of Robert Earl of Huntington and The Death of Robert Earl of Huntington are two closely related Elizabethan-era stage plays on the Robin Hood legend, that were written by Anthony Munday (possibly with help from Henry Chettle) in 1598 and published in 1601. They are among the relatively few surviving examples of the popular drama acted by the Admiral's Men during the Shakespearean era.

Scholars and critics have studied the plays for their place in the evolution of the Robin Hood legend. Munday has been credited as the first person to identify Robin Hood with the Earl of Huntingdon.

== Publication ==
Both plays were entered into the Stationers' Register on 1 December 1600, and were printed in separate quartos in the next year by stationer William Leake. The 1601 quartos were the only editions in the era of English Renaissance theatre; the plays would not be reprinted until the nineteenth century.

Leake's 1601 quartos employ a blackletter or Gothic typeface for the speeches in the plays, with a Roman font used for stage directions and speech prefixes.

== Authorship ==
The plays were originally published anonymously; the 1601 quartos lack any attribution of authorship on their title pages. The account book of theatrical manager Philip Henslowe (known as Henslowe's Diary) records a payment, dated 15 February 1598, to "Antony Monday" for "a playe booke called the firste parte of Robyne Hoode." The Diary records subsequent payments to Munday on 20 and 28 February the same year for "the second pte of Roben Hoode." Given the plays' general resemblances with Munday's earlier drama John a Kent and John a Cumber (c. 1594), scholars have had no problem in accepting Munday's authorship.

Henslowe's Diary also records a payment, dated 25 February 1598, to Henry Chettle for "the second pte of Robart hoode." Chettle was later (25 November 1598) paid for "mending" a Robin Hood play for a Court performance. Based on these facts, many scholars have assigned The Death to Munday and Chettle as collaborators. Comparing The Death to Munday's John a Kent on one hand and to Chettle's Hoffman on the other, some critics have considered Munday the likely author of the Robin Hood material in The Death, and Chettle the probable author of the story of King John's pursuit of Matilda Fitzwater.

Yet John C. Meagher, editor of the Malone Society reprints of the plays, argues that the case for Chettle's participation in the play's authorship is weak. In his judgement, The Downfall is the work of Munday alone, and The Death is also "either primarily or exclusively the work of Munday."

== "Foul papers" ==
For both of the 1601 quartos, the texts were set into type from the author's working drafts or "foul papers" rather than from "fair copies" of the finished texts or from theatrical promptbooks. Both plays contain major discontinuities that would have been corrected in their final versions.

- The most serious problem in The Downfall is the most obvious. The heroine is called Maid Marian for the first 781 lines of the play; then, suddenly and without explanation, she becomes Matilda. She should have been called Matilda from the start, since later in the play she deliberately changes her name to Marian, as a sign of the new identity she has adopted when joining Robin and his Merry Men.
- The Death shows the same type of problems. Characters' names change for no reason. Lord Salisbury becomes Aubery de Vere, Earl of Oxford, and switches back and forth between the two identities. Similarly, Hugh becomes Mowbray.
- In The Death, the character Bonville speaks two speeches before his entrance, and then disappears.

All of these difficulties would have to have been resolved in the plays' finished texts.

== Genre ==
This view of The Downfall and The Death as, to some significant degree, unfinished works in their existing texts, has a bearing on perceptions of the plays' artistic quality and their deficiencies. In Munday's Robin Hood plays, "Motivation is scanty, inner conflict is barely hinted at, and qualities are painted in with primary colors...not much attention is paid to cause and effect. Intrigues are begun and quickly forgotten, important episodes seem to be omitted completely, and diversions frequently have precedence over any logical sequence of events."

Some of these problems could have been remedied or at least palliated in the final versions. Yet some of these traits are inherent in the dramatic form and genre in which Munday worked. The plays "have been strongly criticized as unsatisfactory mixtures of folk tale, melodrama, and farce," when they should be considered as "primarily romances" – "not chronicle plays nor pastoral comedy mixed with tragedy of blood...." As romances, comparable to the romances of Robert Greene and to Shakespeare's late plays, the Munday works show more sense and coherence.

To a substantial degree, the two works form a single whole, a "two-part play." Like other works of this type, Munday's double play employs a dichotomy of dramatic forms: the first part moves "in a comic direction," or "at least toward reconciliation," while the second bends "in a tragic direction."

== Other plays ==
The story of Robin Hood was integral to English folklore, and Munday was far from the first or only dramatist of his time to exploit it. The most prominent Robin Hood play of Munday's era was George a Greene, the Pinner of Wakefield, registered in 1595 and printed in 1599. This anonymous work has often been attributed to Robert Greene. The anonymous Look About You (1599?; printed 1600) also features Robin Hood; one researcher has ascribed it to Munday, or Chettle, or both.

An early Robin Hood play, author unknown, was printed in 1560. An anonymous Robin Hood and Little John (1594) has not survived. William Haughton worked on a Robin Hood's Pennyworths around 1600, but apparently left it unfinished.

In turn, Robert Davenport based his later play King John and Matilda (published 1655) securely on The Death. Some critics have called Davenport's play a mere rewriting of Munday's.

During the Restoration, a drama titled Robin Hood and His Crew of Soldiers was acted at Nottingham on the day of King Charles II's coronation.

== Admiral's drama ==
In Shakespeare's generation, the Admiral's Men were the primary competitors with Shakespeare's company, the Lord Chamberlain's/King's Men. In the years from 1594 to 1602, the two companies were the only ones allowed permanent residence in London. The Admiral's Men performed two early works by George Chapman, and Thomas Middleton's The Roaring Girl; most of their plays, though, were written by a coterie of house playwrights, regularly employed by manager Henslowe. These writers sometimes collaborated in teams of three, four, or even five per play. Henslowe's Diary preserves the titles of dozens of plays written by Chettle, Haughton, Thomas Dekker, John Day, Michael Drayton, Richard Hathwaye, and others. A huge body of this work has disappeared, lost to history; out of the thirty plays Henslowe ordered from his house dramatists in 1598, only Munday's Huntington plays survive. Along with a few other survivors, like Sir John Oldcastle or Haughton's Englishmen for My Money, they illustrate what a whole style of drama was like.

== See also ==
- Robert Fitzooth
