= Devil's Paintbrush =

Devil's Paintbrush may refer to:

- Pilosella aurantiaca, a flower in the daisy family
- Pilosella caespitosa, a flower in the daisy family
- The Devil's Paintbrush, a 2009 novel by Jack Arnott
- a machine gun, see Maxim gun
- a golf course in Ontario

== See also ==
- "The Devil's Paintbrush Road", a song by Annabelle Chvostek from the 2004 album Burned My Ass
