= Luigi Pasqualigo =

Luigi Pasqualigo (1536–1576) was a Venetian soldier and man of letters who wrote the play Il Fedele which was adapted by the English playwright Anthony Munday under the title, Fidele and Fortunio (1584). According to his brother, he was "more a follower of Mars than of Apollo". Pasqualigo apparently took part in the Battle of Lepanto in 1571. He is named as commander of the Spanish galleon Idra (Hydra) of Naples which was stationed on the left wing of the battle.

== Publications ==
- Dalle Lettere Amorose, Libri Quattro, Vinegia, 1573, 1581 and 1607.
- Il Fedele, Venezia, Bolognino Zaltieri, 1576.
- Il Fedele, Comedia…Di Novo Ristampata, e ricorretta, Venetia, appresso Francesco Zinetti, 1579.
- Il Fedele, a cura di Francesca Romana de’Angelis, Roma, E & A editori associati, 1989.
- Gl'Intricati, (pastoral romance), 1581.
- Rime Volgari, Venetia, appresso Gio.Battista Ciotti, 1605.

== Influences ==
Plays influenced by Pasqualigo's play, Il Fedele, include:

- Pierre de Larivey, Le Fidelle, a French version of Luigi Pasqualigo's Il Fedele.
- Anthony Munday, Fidele and Fortunio.
- Abraham Fraunce, Victoria: A Latin Comedy
