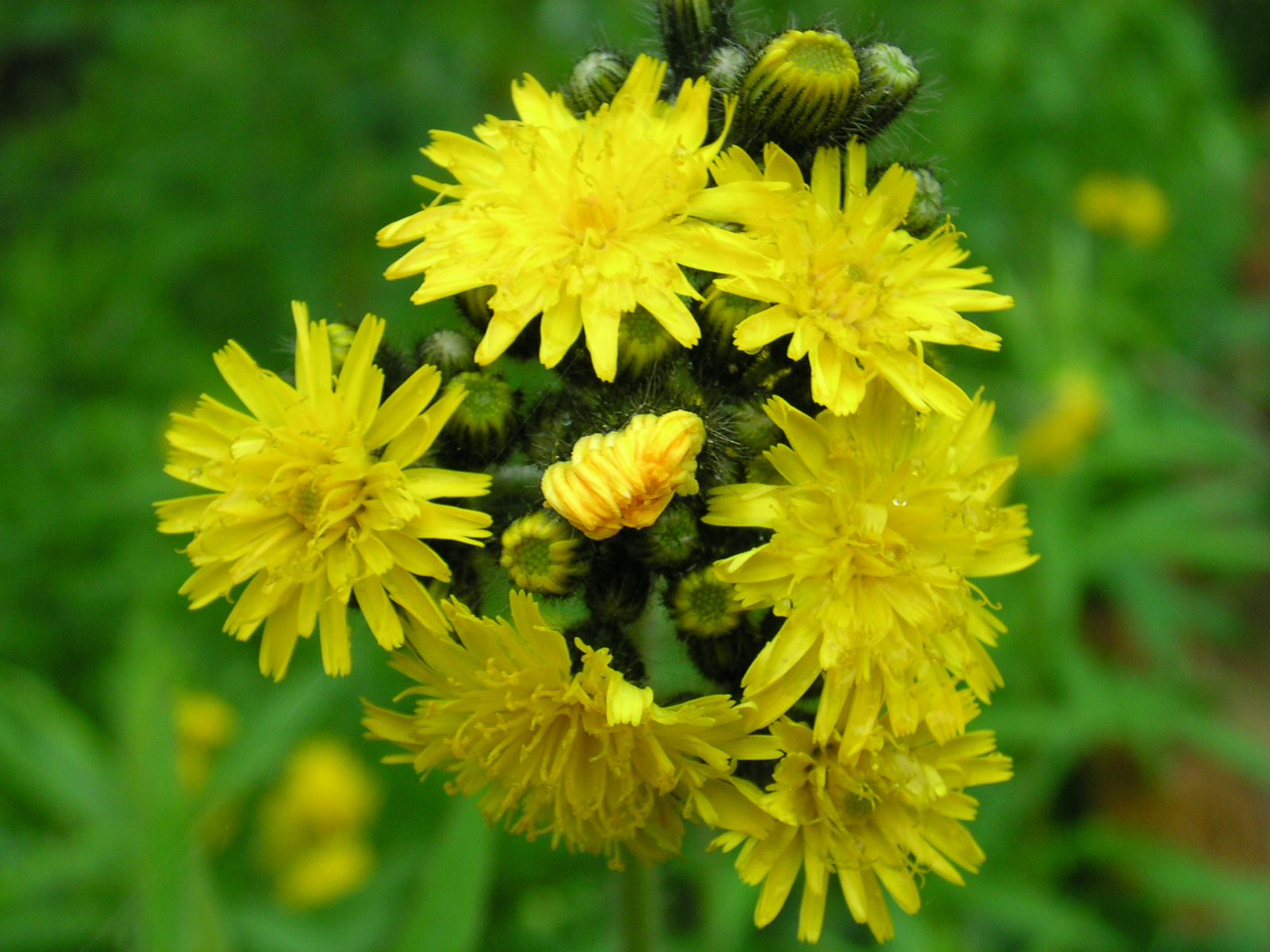

Scientific classification
- Kingdom: Plantae
- Clade: Embryophytes
- Clade: Tracheophytes
- Clade: Angiosperms
- Clade: Eudicots
- Clade: Asterids
- Order: Asterales
- Family: Asteraceae
- Genus: Pilosella
- Species: P. floribunda

Binomial name
- Pilosella floribunda (Wimmer & Grab) Fr.

Synonyms
- Hieracium apatorium (Nägeli & Peter) Üksip; Hieracium arvicola subsp. apatorium; Hieracium assimilatum Norrl.; Hieracium × atramentarium (Nägeli & Peter) Zahn; Hieracium auricula L.; Hieracium baenitzii (Nägeli & Peter) Üksip; Hieracium brachycephalum Norrl. ex Nyman; Hieracium fennicum Norrl. ex Vain.; Hieracium floribundum Wimm. & Grab.; Hieracium fulvescens (Nägeli & Peter) Üksip; Hieracium islandiciforme (Dahlst.) Omang; Hieracium islandicum Dahlst.; Hieracium ladogense Norrl.; Hieracium limbatum Brenner; Hieracium lobarzewskii Rehmann; Hieracium longatum (Peter) Üksip; Hieracium oeneo-roratum Norrl.; Hieracium pubens Norrl.; Hieracium regiomontanum (Nägeli & Peter) Üksip; Hieracium spathophyllum Nägeli & Peter; Hieracium subfloribundum Dahlst.; Hieracium subpratense Norrl. ex Nyman; Hieracium sudavicum (Nägeli & Peter) Üksip; Hieracium svirense Norrl.; Hieracium vitellinum Norrl.; Pilosella assimilata Norrl.; Pilosella atramentaria (Nägeli & Peter) Soják; Pilosella auricula (L.) F.W.Schultz & Sch.Bip.; Pilosella brachycephala Norrl.; Pilosella fennica (Nägeli & Peter) Soják (part); Pilosella fennica subsp. exorrhabda (Nägeli & Peter) Soják; Pilosella interrupta Norrl.; Pilosella islandica (Lange ex Grønlund) Á.Löve; Pilosella ladogensis Norrl.; Pilosella lobarzewskii (Rehmann) Soják; Pilosella subpratensis Norrl.; Pilosella subpubens Norrl.; Pilosella subswirensis Norrl.; Pilosella suecica (Fr.) F.W.Schultz & Sch.Bip.; Pilosella versicolor Arv.-Touv.; Pilosella xanthostigma Norrl.

= Pilosella floribunda =

Species of flowering plant in the daisy family

Pilosella floribunda (synonym Hieracium floribundum, also known as pale hawkweed, smoothish hawkweed, yellow hawkweed, and yellow devil hawkweed) is a species of noxious and herbaceous perennial plant from family Asteraceae that is known in Europe (particularly France) and can also be found in United States and Canada. It was believed that it was a hybrid of Pilosella caespitosa (Hieracium caespitosum and Pilosella lactucella (Hieracium lactucella).

== Description ==
The plant is 10 to 36 inches (250 to 910 mm) tall. The flowers bloom from June to July, are clustered, and are 1/2 inch (13 mm) wide. The leaves are hairy and spatula shaped.
