= Grim the Collier of Croydon =

Seventeenth-century play of uncertain authorship

Grim the Collier of Croyden; or, The Devil and his Dame: with the Devil and Saint Dunston is a seventeenth-century play of uncertain authorship, first published in 1662. The play's title character is an established figure of the popular culture and folklore of the time who appeared in songs and musicals stories – a body of lore the play draws upon. The London coal and charcoal industry was centred on Croydon, to the south of London in Surrey; the original Grimme or Grimes has been claimed to be a real individual, but evidence for this is not forthcoming.

== History ==
On 6 May 1600 the Diary of Philip Henslowe records a payment to playwright William Haughton for a play called The Devil and His Dame. H. Dugdale Sykes made a case for Haughton's authorship of Grim based on common features with Haughton's play Englishmen for my Money, a case that is accepted by some commentators.

Grim first appeared in print in 1662 in a duodecimo drama collection titled Gratiae Theatrales; or, A Choice Ternary of English Plays, a volume that also contains the plays The Marriage Broker and Thorny Abby; or, The London Maid. The collection assigns Grim to "I. T." (which in modern usage could be "J. T."); John Tatham has been proposed as one possible candidate for "I. T." Reports of earlier editions of Grim, in 1599, 1600 and 1606, have proved unverifiable.

The inclusion of a collier and a devil in Grim seems to link it to an earlier play with the same elements. Like Will to Like, an old play (c. 1568) by Ulpian Fulwell, appears to have been acted by Pembroke's Men at Henslowe's Rose Theatre on 28 October 1600; the old play may have influenced Grim, or its revival may have been a response to it. (Fulwell's play employs the traditional tune "Tom Collier of Croydon hath sold his coals".) Grim the Collier also appears in the old (c. 1565) play Damon and Pythias, by Richard Edwardes; both plays employ the same joke, absurdly identifying the character as "collier to the King's own majesty's mouth". One of the sources for Grim is Machiavelli's novella Belfagor arcidiavolo; the play's treatment of Saint Dunstan draws upon the Golden Legend of Jacobus de Voragine.

Grim is one in a long series of devil plays that unite Elizabethan drama with the medieval drama from which it grew. Later examples include Dekker's If This Be Not a Good Play the Devil is in It (1611–12) and Jonson's The Devil Is an Ass (1616).

== Synopsis ==
The devil Belphagor comes to live on Earth for a time, to investigate reports that women have grown extreme in their misbehaviors and have made marriage a curse. He disguises himself as a Spanish doctor named Castiliano. He offers to cure a mute woman named Honoria if she will marry him in return – a proposal that is accepted by the young woman and her family. Once he cures her, however, she repudiates her marital promise, calling him a "base Spaniard" who she wouldn't allow her slave to marry.

All the English seem to turn on him: he is bed-tricked into marrying Honoria's shrewish maid, who cheats on him; one of the maid's former suitors tries to kill him; and his wife eventually poisons him. Castiliano dies just as Belphagor's predetermined time on Earth expires, and the devil returns to Hell with great relief at escaping the toils of earthly existence and its ferocious females.

The play's depiction of its devil is surprisingly restrained; he is described as "patient, mild, and pitiful", and is rather a sympathetic character than otherwise. Its infernal domain, ruled by Pluto, is a mixture of Christian and classical elements.

In the play's subplot, Grim the collier is a simple and good-hearted soul who is devoted to his love, Joan of Badenstock. After complications with Clack the Miller and Parson Shorthose, Grim wins her in the end, with the help of Puck or Robin Goodfellow (alias Akercock; in this play, a devil like Belphagor).

== Grim-the-collier as a common name for Pilosella aurantiaca ==
Grim-the-collier is also the common name for Pilosella aurantiaca (sometimes under the genus Hieracium). Other common names are Orange Hawkweed, Fox and Cubs, Devil's paintbrush and Red devil.
