= London's Love to Prince Henry =

1610 pageant

London's Love to Prince Henry (31 May 1610), was a pageant on the River Thames organised by the city of London for the investiture of Prince Henry as Prince of Wales.

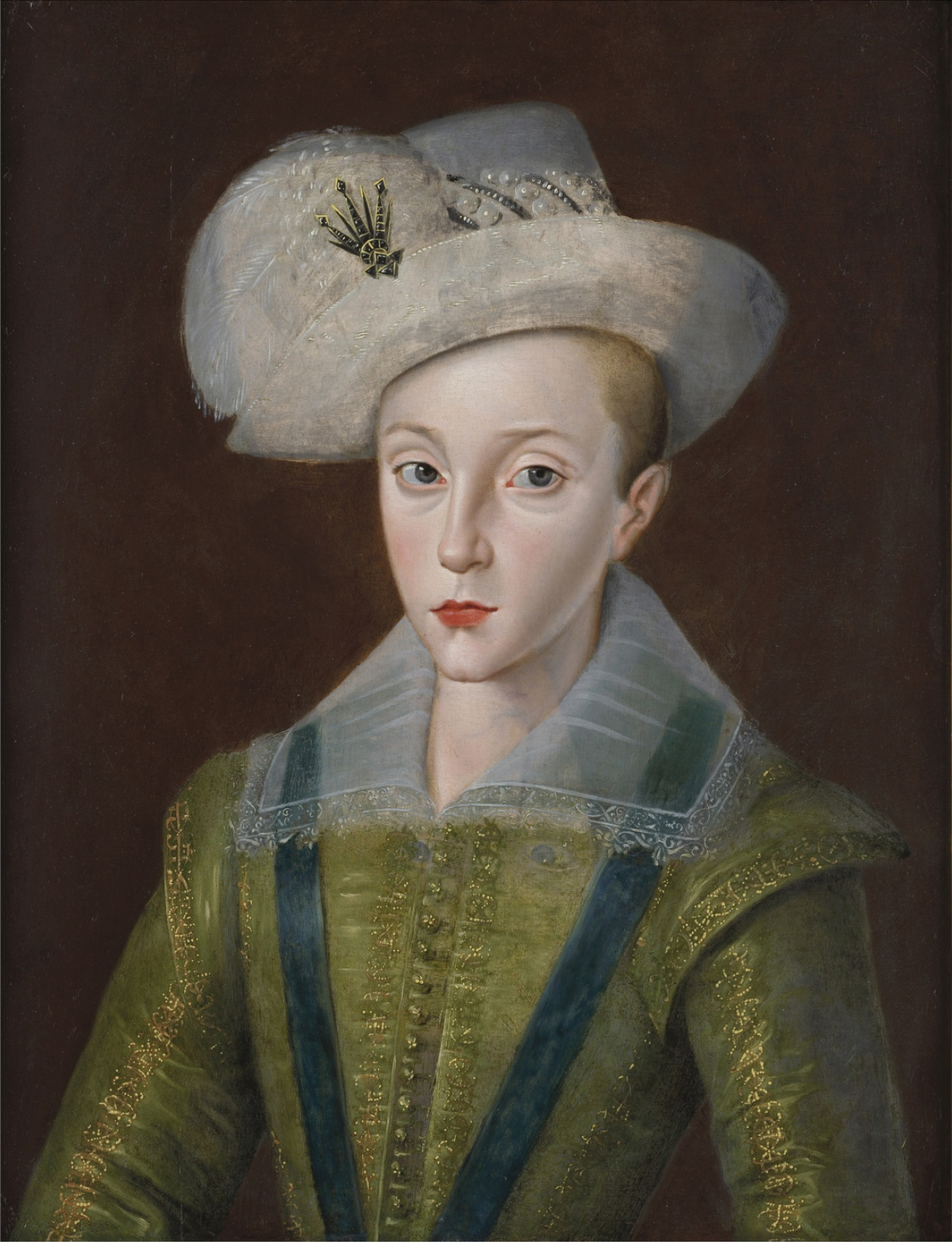
Prince Henry by Robert Peake

== Organisation and composition ==
This pageant was performed on the Thames between Chelsea and Whitehall. It was organised by the Lord Mayor of London, and written by Anthony Munday who subsequently published an account of the spectacle. Fireworks costing £700 were provided by Roger Dallison of the Royal Ordnance.

== Themes and symbols ==
=== Symbols of Cornwall and Wales ===
Prince Henry's barge coming from Richmond Palace encountered Corinea, Queen of Cornwall (John Rice), at Chelsea riding on a whale. She declared London's love for him. Next at Whitehall, Henry met Amphion, a Genius of Wales, (Richard Burbage), riding a dolphin, who bid the Prince farewell. Musicians were concealed in the whale and the dolphin. The mayor and the guilds followed the prince in fifty barges.

Corinea, riding on a whale, wore a "watrie habit yet riche riche and costly, with a Coronet of Pearles and Cockle shelles on her head." Amphion was "a grave and judicious Prophet-like personage, attyred in his apt habits, every way answerable to his state and profession, with a wreathe of Sea-shelles on his head, and his harpe haging in fayre twine before him."

=== Aquatic themes from mythology ===
Frederick Ulrich, Duke of Brunswick-Lüneburg nephew of Anne of Denmark, was among the audience and passengers on the prince's barge. The following Monday a water-fight and fireworks night was planned, and announced by the appearance of Proteus. This event was rained off, but on 5 June 1610 the aquatic theme continued with the court masque Tethys' Festival.

=== Tilting and pageant costume ===
There was tilting on the afternoon of Wednesday 6 June. A Scottish lord made a pageant device of a cloud. Lord Compton disguised himself as a shepherd in a bower designed by Inigo Jones and his mounted attendants "wore verie brave attyre, howbeit everie wearinge a hat of strawe, and havinge theyer faces paynted as blacke as the devill". More usually, pageant actors at the English court wore fabric vizards rather than blackface make-up, with the exception of The Masque of Blacknesse.

=== Staged sea battle ===
The delayed sea fight took place that evening. A Turkish pirate ship defending a castle engaged with two merchant ships. The merchants came under fire from the pirate castle, then two warships assisted, many sailors appeared to be killed and thrown in the sea, and finally the pirate castle was blown up in a firework display.

== Record of the festivities ==
John Noyes, Member of Parliament for Calne, compiled an account of the festivities for his wife, including material which he "received by hearsay". Noyes thought that Compton's disguise as a shepherd might refer to the wealth of his father-in-law Sir John Spencer, founded on woollen cloth. He was impressed by a description of the rockets on 6 June, powerful enough "to fly up into the air twice so high as St Paul's tower and when it was highest it would stream down again as long as bellropes, and the fires did seem to fight and skirmish one with another in the skies; which was very pleasant to behold in the dark evening".
