= Pilosella levieri =

Scientific classification
- Kingdom: Plantae
- Clade: Embryophytes
- Clade: Tracheophytes
- Clade: Angiosperms
- Clade: Eudicots
- Clade: Asterids
- Order: Asterales
- Family: Asteraceae
- Genus: Pilosella
- Species: P. levieri

Binomial name
- Pilosella levieri (Peter) Soják

Synonyms
- Hieracium levieri Peter; Hieracium longiscapum Boiss.; Hieracium spathophyllum subsp. longiscapum; Pilosella longiscapa (Nägeli & Peter) Coșkunç; Pilosella longiscapa (Nägeli & Peter) Sennikov

Species of flowering plant in the daisy family

Pilosella levieri (synonym Hieracium longiscapum) is a species of flowering plant in the family Asteraceae.
