= The Stepmother's Tragedy =

The Stepmother's Tragedy is a play written by Henry Chettle and Thomas Dekker. It is mentioned in Philip Henslowe's diary in August 1599. No extant copies of the play are known.
