= Pilosella schultesii =

Scientific classification
- Kingdom: Plantae
- Clade: Tracheophytes
- Clade: Angiosperms
- Clade: Eudicots
- Clade: Asterids
- Order: Asterales
- Family: Asteraceae
- Genus: Pilosella
- Species: P. schultesii

Binomial name
- Pilosella schultesii (F.W.Schultz) F.W.Schultz & Sch.Bip. 1862

Synonyms
- Hieracium schultesii F.W.Schultz

Species of flowering plant

Pilosella schultesii is a European plant species in the tribe Cichorieae within the family Asteraceae. It grows France including Corsica, Sardinia, Switzerland, Austria, Switzerland, Hungary, Romania, and Slovenia.
