= Abraham Fraunce =

16th-century English poet c. 1558/1560 – c. 1592/1593

Abraham Fraunce (c. 1558/1560 – c. 1592/1593) was an English poet.

== Life ==
A native of Shropshire, he was born between 1558 and 1560. His name appears in a list of pupils of Shrewsbury School in January 1571, and he joined St John's College, Cambridge, in 1576, becoming a fellow in 1580/1. His Latin comedy, Victoria, dedicated to Sir Philip Sidney, was probably written at Cambridge, where he remained until he had taken his M.A. degree in 1583. He was called to the bar at Gray's Inn in 1588, and then apparently practised as a barrister in the court of the Welsh marches.

After the death of his patron, Sidney, Fraunce was protected by Sidney's sister, Mary Herbert, Countess of Pembroke. His last work was published in 1592. According to the 19th-century antiquary Joseph Hunter in his Chorus Vatum, in 1633 Fraunce wrote an Epithalamium in honour of the marriage of Lady Magdalen Egerton, seventh daughter of the Earl of Bridgwater, in whose service he may have been; thus, it was long assumed that Fraunce died in or after 1633. More recent scholarship, however, places Fraunce's death in 1592 or 1593 and attributes the Cutler-Egerton epithalamium to Abraham Darcie.

== Works ==
His works are:

- The Lamentations of Amintas for the death of Phyllis (1587), a version in English hexameters of his friend, Thomas Watson's, Latin Amyntas
- The Lawiers Logike, exemplifying the praecepts of Logike by the practise of the common Lawe (1585)
- The Arcadian Rhetorike (1588)
- Abrahami Fransi Insignium, Armorum ... explicatio (1588)
- The Countess of Pembroke's Yvychurch (1591/2), containing a translation of Tasso's Aminta, a reprint of his earlier version of Watson
- The Lamentation of Corydon for the love of Alexis (Virgil, eclogue II), a short translation from Heliodorus, and, in the third part (1592) "Aminta's Dale," a collection of "conceited tales" supposed to be related by the nymphs of Ivychurch
- The Countess of Pembroke's Emanuell (1591)
- The Third Part of Pembroke's Ivychurch, entitled Aminta's Dale (1592)
- Victoria, a Latin Comedy (written before or in 1583; not published until 1906). It is a translation of Luigi Pasqualigo's play, Il Fedele.

The Arcadian Rhetorike owes much to earlier critical treatises, but has a special interest from its references to Edmund Spenser, and Fraunce quotes from the Faerie Queene a year before the publication of the first books. In Colin Clouts Come Home Again, Spenser speaks of Fraunce as Corydon, on account of his translations of Virgil's second eclogue. His poems are written in classical metres, and he was regarded by his contemporaries as the best exponent of Gabriel Harvey's theory. Even Thomas Nashe had a good word for "sweete Master Fraunce".

The Countess of Pembroke's Emanuell, hexameters on the nativity and passion of Christ, with versions of some psalms, were reprinted by Alexander Grosart in the third volume of his Miscellanies of the Fuller Worthies' Library (1872). Joseph Hunter in his Chorus Vatum stated that five of Fraunce's songs were included in Sidney's Astrophel and Stella, but these should probably be attributed not to Fraunce, but to Thomas Campion. See a life prefixed to the transcription of a manuscript Latin comedy by Fraunce, Victoria, by Professor GC Moore Smith, published in W Bang's Materialien zur Kunde des älteren Englischen Dramas, vol. xiv, 1906.

Dana Sutton argues that Fraunce may be the author of Hymenaeus (1578).
