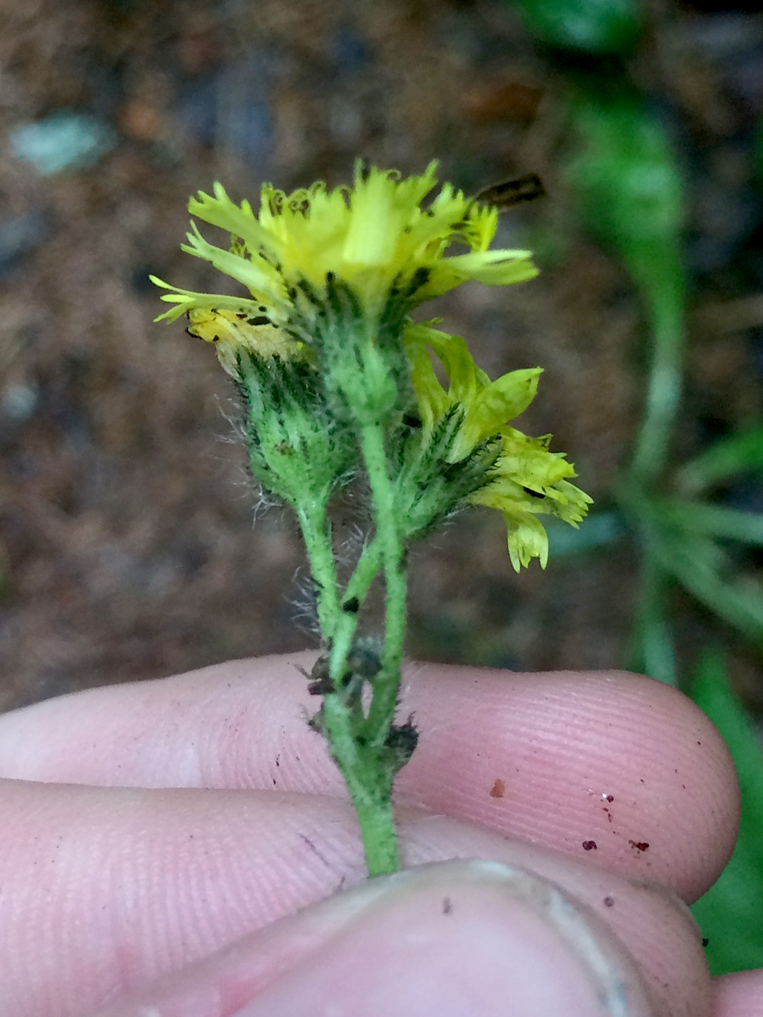

Scientific classification
- Kingdom: Plantae
- Clade: Embryophytes
- Clade: Tracheophytes
- Clade: Angiosperms
- Clade: Eudicots
- Clade: Asterids
- Order: Asterales
- Family: Asteraceae
- Genus: Pilosella
- Species: P. flagellaris

Binomial name
- Pilosella flagellaris (Willd.) Arv.-Touv.

Synonyms
- Hieracium chrysophthalmum Norrl.; Hieracium flagellare Willd.; Hieracium homostegium Norrl.; Hieracium inceptans Norrl.; Hieracium niankoviense Rehmann; Hieracium petunnikovii (Peter) Üksip; Hieracium prognatum Norrl.; Hieracium tatrense (Nägeli & Peter) Üksip

= Pilosella flagellaris =

Species of flowering plant in the daisy family

Pilosella flagellaris (synonym Hieracium flagellare) is a European plant species in the tribe Cichorieae within the family Asteraceae. It is native to Europe but naturalized in scattered locations in the United States and Canada.

Pilosella flagellaris is a small herb up to 20 cm (7.9 in) tall, with leaves mostly in a rosette at the bottom. Leaves are up to 130 mm (5.1 in) long, with no teeth on the edges. One stalk will produce 2-4 flower heads in a flat-topped array. Each head has 90–120 yellow ray flowers but no disc flowers.
