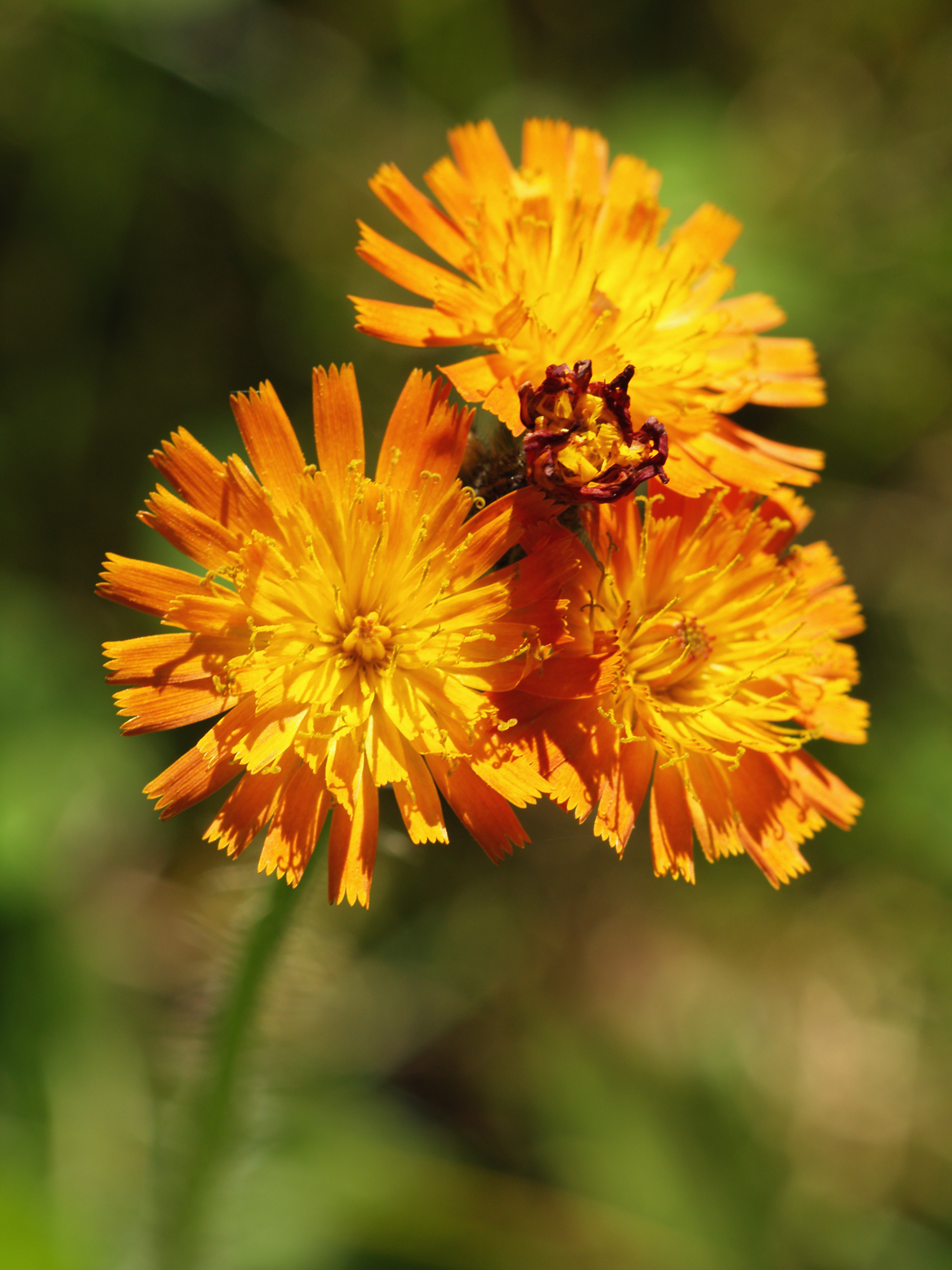
- Pilosella aurantiaca

Scientific classification
- Kingdom: Plantae
- Clade: Embryophytes
- Clade: Tracheophytes
- Clade: Angiosperms
- Clade: Eudicots
- Clade: Asterids
- Order: Asterales
- Family: Asteraceae
- Subfamily: Cichorioideae
- Tribe: Cichorieae
- Subtribe: Hieraciinae
- Genus: Pilosella; Hill

= Pilosella =

Genus of flowering plants in the daisy family

Pilosella is a genus of flowering plants in the family Asteraceae. It includes approximately 250 species native to temperate Eurasia and northwestern Africa. Some sources include it within the genus Hieracium.

== Species ==
As of August 2022, Plants of the World Online accepted the following species:

- Pilosella abakurae (Schelk. & Zahn) Soják
- Pilosella acutifolia (Vill.) Arv.-Touv.
- Pilosella adenocantabrica Mateo & Egido
- Pilosella adenogaliciana Mateo & Egido
- Pilosella aiboensis (Mateo & Egido) Mateo, Egido & E.Fidalgo
- Pilosella aletschensis (Zahn) Soják
- Pilosella alpicola (Schleich. ex Hoppe) F.W.Schultz & Sch.Bip.
- Pilosella alturgelliana Mateo
- Pilosella amaurocephala (Peter) Soják
- Pilosella anchusoides Arv.-Touv.
- Pilosella aneimena (Nägeli & Peter) Soják
- Pilosella anobrachia (Arv.-Touv. & Gaut.) S.Bräut. & Greuter
- Pilosella aranii Mateo
- Pilosella arbasiana Mateo & Egido
- Pilosella argyrocoma (Zahn) F.W.Schultz & Sch.Bip.
- Pilosella argyrogaliciana Mateo & Egido
- Pilosella argyrolegionensis Mateo & Egido
- Pilosella arida (Freyn) Soják
- Pilosella arnoseroides (Nägeli & Peter) Soják
- Pilosella aurantella (Nägeli & Peter) Soják
- Pilosella aurantiaca (L.) F.W.Schultz & Sch.Bip.
- Pilosella auriculiformis (Fr.) F.W.Schultz & Sch.Bip.
- Pilosella auriculoides (Láng) Arv.-Touv.
- Pilosella balansae (Boiss.) S.Bräut. & Greuter
- Pilosella basifurca (Peter) Soják
- Pilosella bauhini (Schult.) Arv.-Touv.
- Pilosella biflora Arv.-Touv.
- Pilosella × bifurca (M.Bieb.) F.W.Schultz & Sch.Bip.
- Pilosella biglana (Bornm. & Zahn) S.Bräut. & Greuter
- Pilosella billyana (de Retz) Mateo
- Pilosella blaui (B.Schütt & Zahn) Gottschl.
- Pilosella blyttiana (Fr.) F.W.Schultz & Sch.Bip.
- Pilosella bodewigiana (Zahn) Soják
- Pilosella bonaquae (Buttler & W.Lippert) S.Bräut. & Greuter
- Pilosella brachiata (Bertero ex DC.) F.W.Schultz & Sch.Bip.
- Pilosella brachycoma (Nägeli & Peter) H.P.Fuchs
- Pilosella breviscapa (DC.) Soják
- Pilosella bryhnii (Blytt ex Omang) Soják
- Pilosella brzovecensis (Horvat & Pawł.) Soják
- Pilosella budensis (Borbás) Soják
- Pilosella bulgarica Szeląg & Vladimir.
- Pilosella × byzantina (Boiss.) P.D.Sell & C.West
- Pilosella caballeroi (Mateo) Mateo
- Pilosella caespitosa (Dumort.) P.D.Sell & C.West
- Pilosella calodon (Tausch ex Peter) Soják
- Pilosella calomastix (Nägeli & Peter) Soják
- Pilosella capillata (Arv.-Touv.) Mateo
- Pilosella castellana (Boiss. & Reut.) F.W.Schultz & Sch.Bip.
- Pilosella caucasica (Nägeli & Peter) Sennikov
- Pilosella cernua (Fr.) F.W.Schultz & Sch.Bip.
- Pilosella × chaetocephala (H.Hofmann) Holub
- Pilosella chaetophyton (Zahn) S.Bräut. & Greuter
- Pilosella cinereiformis (R.Meissn. & Zahn) S.Bräut. & Greuter
- Pilosella cinerosiformis (Nägeli & Peter) Soják
- Pilosella cochlearis Norrl.
- Pilosella corymbulifera (Arv.-Touv.) Arv.-Touv.
- Pilosella corymbuloides (Arv.-Touv.) S.Bräut. & Greuter
- Pilosella crassiseta (Peter) Soják
- Pilosella cymiflora (Nägeli & Peter) S.Bräut. & Greuter
- Pilosella cymosa (L.) F.W.Schultz & Sch.Bip.
- Pilosella czerepninii Tupitz.
- Pilosella densiflora (Tausch) Soják
- Pilosella × derubella (Gottschl. & Schuhw.) S.Bräut. & Greuter
- Pilosella × deschatresii J.-M.Tison
- Pilosella dichotoma Soják
- Pilosella dimorphoides Norrl.
- Pilosella dubia (L.) F.W.Schultz & Sch.Bip.
- Pilosella dublitzkii (B.Fedtsch. & Nevski) Tupitz.
- Pilosella × dutartrei J.-M.Tison
- Pilosella echioides (Lumn.) F.W.Schultz & Sch.Bip.
- Pilosella eglandulosa (Sudre) Mateo
- Pilosella eminens (Peter) Soják
- Pilosella erythrochrista (Nägeli & Peter) S.Bräut. & Greuter
- Pilosella erythrodonta (Zahn) Soják
- Pilosella euchaetia (Nägeli & Peter) Soják
- Pilosella euchaetiiformis (Zahn.) Gottschl.
- Pilosella fainensis Gottschl.
- Pilosella fallacina (F.W.Schultz) F.W.Schultz
- Pilosella fallax (Willd.) Arv.-Touv.
- Pilosella faurei Arv.-Touv.
- Pilosella flagellaris (Willd.) Arv.-Touv.
- Pilosella floribunda (Wimm. & Grab.) Fr.
- Pilosella fontqueri (Pau) Mateo
- Pilosella frigidaria (Nägeli & Peter) Soják
- Pilosella fuernrohrii (Vollm.) S.Bräut. & Greuter
- Pilosella fulviseta (Bartol.) Soják
- Pilosella fusca (Vill.) Arv.-Touv.
- Pilosella × fuscoatra (Nägeli & Peter) Soják
- Pilosella galliciana (Pau) M.Laínz
- Pilosella glacialis (Reyn. ex Lachen.) F.W.Schultz & Sch.Bip.
- Pilosella glomerata (Froel.) Fr.
- Pilosella grossheimii (Zahn) Coșkunç. & Beyazoğlu
- Pilosella × gudarica Mateo
- Pilosella guthnikiana (Hegetschw. & Heer) Soják
- Pilosella halacsyi (Heldr. ex Halácsy) Soják
- Pilosella × heterodoxa (Tausch) Soják
- Pilosella heterodoxiformis (Zahn) S.Bräut. & Greuter
- Pilosella heterogaliciana Mateo & Egido
- Pilosella heteromelana (Zahn) Mateo
- Pilosella hirtocastellana Mateo & Egido
- Pilosella hoppeana (Schult.) F.W.Schultz & Sch.Bip.
- Pilosella hybrida (Vill.) F.W.Schultz & Sch.Bip.
- Pilosella hyperborea (Fr.) F.W.Schultz & Sch.Bip.
- Pilosella hypeurocinerea Mateo & Egido
- Pilosella hypeurya (Peter) Soják
- Pilosella hypeurygenes (A.W.Hill) S.Bräut. & Greuter
- Pilosella hypoleuca Arv.-Touv.
- Pilosella iberoatlantica Mateo & Egido
- Pilosella ilgazensis Vladimir., Coșkunç. & Kit Tan
- Pilosella iserana (R.Uechtr.) Soják
- Pilosella katunensis Tupitz.
- Pilosella kebeshensis (Stepanov) Tupitz.
- Pilosella koernickeana (Nägeli & Peter) Soják
- Pilosella kozlowskyana (Zahn) Soják
- Pilosella kumbelica (B.Fedtsch. & Nevski) Sennikov
- Pilosella lactocantabrica Mateo & Egido
- Pilosella lactucella (Wallr.) P.D.Sell & C.West
- Pilosella laggeri (Sch.Bip. ex Rchb.) F.W.Schultz & Sch.Bip.
- Pilosella lamprocantabrica Mateo & Egido
- Pilosella lamprocoma (Nägeli & Peter) Schljakov
- Pilosella lamprogaliciana Mateo & Egido
- Pilosella lathraea (Peter) Soják
- Pilosella legiogudarica Mateo & Egido
- Pilosella legionensis Mateo & Egido
- Pilosella legiotremedalis Mateo & Egido
- Pilosella leptadeniiformis (Üksip) Tupitz.
- Pilosella leptoclados (Peter) Soják
- Pilosella leptophyton (Nägeli & Peter) S.Bräut. & Greuter
- Pilosella leucopsilon (Arv.-Touv.) Gottschl.
- Pilosella levieri (Peter) Soják
- Pilosella litardiereana (Zahn) Soják
- Pilosella longisquama (Peter) Holub
- Pilosella lydiae (Schischk. & Steinb.) Tupitz.
- Pilosella macranthela (Nägeli & Peter) Soják
- Pilosella macranthiformis (Zahn) S.Bräut. & Greuter
- Pilosella macrostolona (Gus.Schneid.) Soják
- Pilosella macrotricha (Boiss.) F.W.Schultz & Sch.Bip.
- Pilosella macutensis (K.Malý & Zahn) Soják
- Pilosella mampodrensis Mateo & Egido
- Pilosella maraniana Mateo & Egido
- Pilosella × maschukensis (Litv. & Zahn) Soják
- Pilosella massagetovii (Gamajun. ex Kamelin & Zuckerw.) Sennikov
- Pilosella mayeri (Vollm.) Soják
- Pilosella medioposita (Gottschl.) Gottschl.
- Pilosella megargyrocoma Mateo & Egido
- Pilosella megatricha (Borbás) Soják
- Pilosella × melinomelas (Peter) Holub
- Pilosella merxmuelleriana (S.Bräut.) S.Bräut. & Greuter
- Pilosella moechiadia (Peter) S.Bräut. & Greuter
- Pilosella montiberica Mateo & Egido
- Pilosella muscelii (Prodan) S.Bräut. & Greuter
- Pilosella neogelmii (Gottschl.) Gottschl.
- Pilosella neotremedalis Mateo
- Pilosella nevadensis (Arv.-Touv.) Mateo & Greuter
- Pilosella nigrogudarica Mateo & Egido
- Pilosella nigrolegionensis Mateo & Egido
- Pilosella niveocantabrica Mateo & Egido
- Pilosella niveocastellana Mateo & Egido
- Pilosella niveogaliciana Mateo & Egido
- Pilosella noguerensis Mateo
- Pilosella norrliniiformis (Pohle & Zahn) Soják
- Pilosella notha (Huter) S.Bräut. & Greuter
- Pilosella novosibirskensis Tupitz.
- Pilosella occidentalis (Nyár.) Soják
- Pilosella officinarum Vaill.
- Pilosella onegensis Norrl.
- Pilosella oroasturica Mateo & Egido
- Pilosella orogaliciana Mateo & Egido
- Pilosella orolegionensis Mateo & Egido
- Pilosella pachycymigera (Gottschl.) Gottschl.
- Pilosella pachypilon (Peter) Soják
- Pilosella pannoniciformis (Litv. & Zahn) Soják
- Pilosella panticosae Mateo
- Pilosella paragoga (Nägeli & Peter) Soják
- Pilosella paragogiformis (Besse & Zahn) Soják
- Pilosella pavichii (Heuff.) Holub
- Pilosella pavichiodes S.Bräut. & Greuter
- Pilosella × pawlowskiellum (Merxm.) Holub
- Pilosella peleteriana (Mérat) F.W.Schultz & Sch.Bip.
- Pilosella permutata (Nägeli & Peter) Soják
- Pilosella petraea F.W.Schultz & Sch.Bip.
- Pilosella pieriana Gottschl. & Dunkel
- Pilosella piloselliflora (Nägeli & Peter) Soják
- Pilosella pilosellina (F.W.Schultz) F.W.Schultz & Sch.Bip. ex Soják
- Pilosella piloselloides (Vill.) Soják
- Pilosella pinea (Schischk. & Serg.) Tupitz.
- Pilosella pintodasilva (de Retz) Mateo
- Pilosella plaicensis (Woł.) Soják
- Pilosella polioderma (Dahlst.) Soják
- Pilosella × polymastix (Peter) Holub
- Pilosella portae (Willk. ex T.Durand & B.D.Jacks.) Mateo & Greuter
- Pilosella procera (Fr.) F.W.Schultz & Sch.Bip.
- Pilosella procerigena (Litv. & Zahn) Sennikov
- Pilosella × promeces (Peter) Holub
- Pilosella prussica (Nägeli & Peter) Soják
- Pilosella pseudofidalgoana Mateo & Egido
- Pilosella pseudogalliciana Mateo
- Pilosella pseudogudarica Mateo & Egido
- Pilosella × pseudolactucella Gottschl.
- Pilosella pseudomaraniana Mateo & Egido
- Pilosella pseudopanticosae Mateo & Egido
- Pilosella pseudopilosella (Ten.) Soják
- Pilosella pseudosulphurea (Touton) Soják
- Pilosella pseudotrichodes (Zahn) Soják
- Pilosella pseudovahlii (de Retz) Mateo
- Pilosella puenteana Mateo & Egido
- Pilosella rhenovulcanica (Gottschl. & Heinrichs) Bomble
- Pilosella rhodopea (Griseb.) Szeląg
- Pilosella ricoana Mateo
- Pilosella rothiana (Wallr.) F.W.Schultz & Sch.Bip.
- Pilosella × rubra (Peter) Soják
- Pilosella ruprechtii (Boiss.) P.D.Sell & C.West
- Pilosella sabinopsis (Ganesch. & Zahn) Tupitz.
- Pilosella salernicola (Vetter & Zahn) Soják
- Pilosella samokoviensis (T.Georgiev & Zahn) S.Bräut. & Greuter
- Pilosella saussureoides Arv.-Touv.
- Pilosella scandinavica (Dahlst.) Schljakov
- Pilosella schelkownikovii (Zahn.) Soják
- Pilosella × schizosciadia Gottschl.
- Pilosella schneidii (Schack & Zahn) S.Bräut. & Greuter
- Pilosella schultesii (F.W.Schultz) F.W.Schultz & Sch.Bip. ex H.P.Fuchs
- Pilosella × sciadogena Gottschl.
- Pilosella sedelmeyeriana (Zahn) S.Bräut. & Greuter
- Pilosella segoviensis Mateo
- Pilosella serbica (F.W.Schultz & Sch.Bip.) Szeląg
- Pilosella setifolia (Touton) S.Bräut. & Greuter
- Pilosella sintenisii (Freyn) Soják
- Pilosella solacolui S.Bräut. & Greuter
- Pilosella soleiroliana (Arv.-Touv. & Briq.) S.Bräut. & Greuter
- Pilosella stenosoma (Nägeli & Peter) Soják
- Pilosella sterrochaetia (Nägeli & Peter) Soják
- Pilosella stoloniflora (Waldst. & Kit.) F.W.Schultz & Sch.Bip.
- Pilosella subdecolorans (Norrl.) S.Bräut. & Greuter
- Pilosella subgudarica Mateo & Egido
- Pilosella subrubens (Arv.-Touv.) Zahn
- Pilosella substoloniflora (Peter) Soják
- Pilosella subtardans (Nägeli & Peter) Soják
- Pilosella subulatissima (Zahn) Mateo
- Pilosella sulphurea (Döll) F.W.Schultz & Sch.Bip.
- Pilosella × tambovica Sennikov
- Pilosella tardiuscula (Peter) Soják
- Pilosella tardogaliciana Mateo & Egido
- Pilosella tendina (Nägeli & Peter) Soják
- Pilosella tephrocephala (Vuk.) Soják
- Pilosella tephrochlorella (Ganesch. & Zahn) Tupitz.
- Pilosella tephrodes (Nägeli & Peter) S.Bräut. & Greuter
- Pilosella tephroglauca (Nägeli & Peter) Soják
- Pilosella tephrophyton (Oborný & Zahn) Soják
- Pilosella tinctilingua (Zahn) Soják
- Pilosella tjumentzevii (Serg. & Üksip) Tupitz.
- Pilosella transbotnica (Norrl.) T.Tyler
- Pilosella × tremedalis Mateo
- Pilosella tricholepia (Nägeli & Peter) Dostál
- Pilosella trigenes (Peter) Soják
- Pilosella triplex (Peter) Soják
- Pilosella tubulascens Norrl.
- Pilosella turolensis Mateo
- Pilosella ullepitschii (Błocki) Szeląg
- Pilosella unamunoi (C.Vicioso) Mateo
- Pilosella universitatis Mateo & Egido
- Pilosella vahlii (Froel.) F.W.Schultz & Sch.Bip.
- Pilosella vansoestii (de Retz) Mateo
- Pilosella × variifurca (Zahn) Gottschl.
- Pilosella velutina (Hegetschw.) F.W.Schultz & Sch.Bip.
- Pilosella verruculata (Link) Soják
- Pilosella × viridifolia (Peter) Holub
- Pilosella visianii F.W.Schultz & Sch.Bip.
- Pilosella walteri-langii (Gottschl.) S.Bräut. & Greuter
- Pilosella willingorum Gottschl.
- Pilosella wolgensis (Zahn) Soják
- Pilosella woronowiana (Zahn) Soják
- Pilosella xilocae Mateo
- Pilosella ziziana (Tausch) F.W.Schultz & Sch.Bip.

Later discovered species include:

- Pilosella kalinensis Szelag & Vladimirov, discovered on the highest peaks in the Rila Mountains in Bulgaria and described in 2025
