= Fidele and Fortunio =

1584 play by Anthony Munday

Fidele and Fortunio was a comedy written by Anthony Munday and first published in 1584. Its authorship has been disputed but scholars are now generally agreed that the initials "A.M." appearing in the first edition of the play refer to Anthony Munday. Its chief interest nowadays lies in its possible influence on Shakespeare as the play was performed around the time he arrived in London and established himself as an actor and later as a playwright. It also gives us a view of the English language prior to the influence of Shakespeare on the language. The play is loosely based on the Italian play Il Fedele by Luigi Pasqualigo.

== The Plot ==
Fidele is an Italian gentleman who returns from a journey abroad to find that his lover Victoria has fallen in love with his friend Fortunio who loves her in his turn. However, Fortunio is unsure of Victoria's love and the play opens with his asking an opportunist called Captain Crackstone to investigate this, though Crackstone is himself secretly in love with Victoria. Victoria in her turn is unsure of Fortunio's love for her and employs a sorceress named Medusa to enchant him into loving her. Fidele's schoolmaster, Pedante, and Victoria's maid, Attilia are brought into the plot. Another character Virginia is in love with Fidele, and Fortunio turns his attentions on her after he is persuaded falsely that Victoria has betrayed him. After further entanglements and misadventures, the play ends happily with Fortunio marrying Virginia and with further marriages between Fidele and Victoria, Crackstone and Attilia, and Pedante and Medusa.

== Influence on Shakespeare ==
Shakespeare may have been influenced by the play, for example, in the ingredients used by the witch Medusa which are remarkably similar to the ingredients used by the witches in Macbeth in casting their spells, for example:

Fidele and Fortunio

Medusa: A wanton's Goates braine,
and the Liver of a purple Doove.
A Cockes eye, and a Capons spurre,
the left legge of a Quaile:
a Ganders tung, a mounting Eagles tayle.

Macbeth-

Second Witch: Fillet of a fenny snake,
In the cauldron boil and bake;
Eye of newt and toe of frog,
Wool of bat and tongue of dog,
Adder's fork and blind-worm's sting,
Lizard's leg and owlet's wing,

The "deceived lover" plot is a version of that used in Much Ado About Nothing.

== Sources ==
- Renata Oggero, "Translated out of Italian". From Pasqualigo to Munday: Rewriting Italian Comedy in Elizabethan England. Available at http://dspace.unitus.it/bitstream/2067/93/1/Oggero_Translated_out_of_Italian.pdf
- Richard Hosley, A Critical Edition of Anthony Munday's Fedele and Fortunio (Renaissance Drama) Garland Publishing, 1981.
- Martin Wiggins and Catherine Richardson, British Drama - 1533-1642: A Catalogue, (Oxford: OUP, 2012), Vol. III, 1567-1589, 'Fedele and Fortunio', pp. 325–327.
