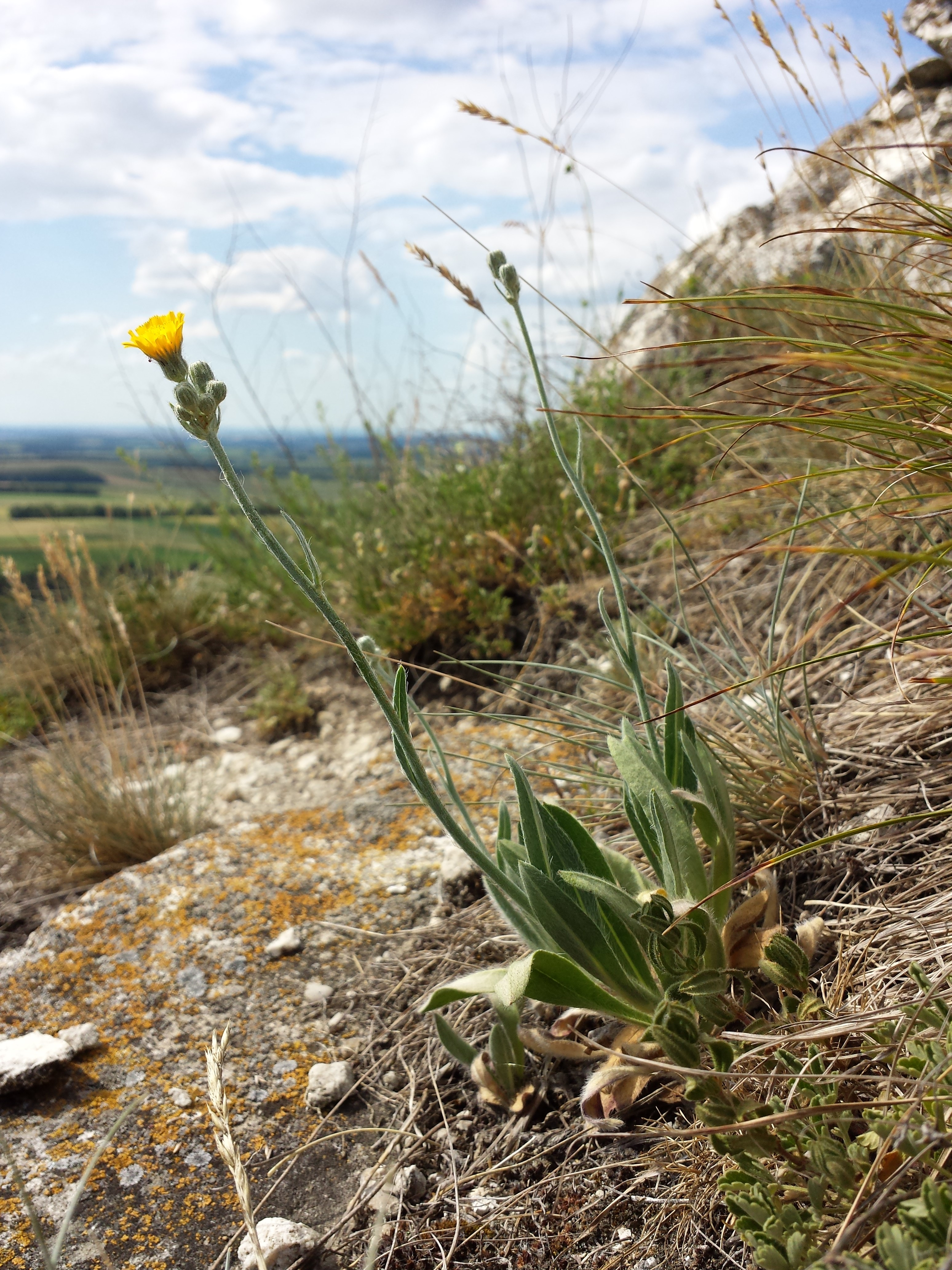

Scientific classification
- Kingdom: Plantae
- Clade: Tracheophytes
- Clade: Angiosperms
- Clade: Eudicots
- Clade: Asterids
- Order: Asterales
- Family: Asteraceae
- Genus: Pilosella
- Species: P. echioides

Binomial name
- Pilosella echioides (Lumn.) F.W.Schultz & Sch.Bip.

= Pilosella echioides =

Species of flowering plant

Pilosella echioides is a species of flowering plant belonging to the family Asteraceae.

Its native range is Europe to Central Siberia and Himalaya.
