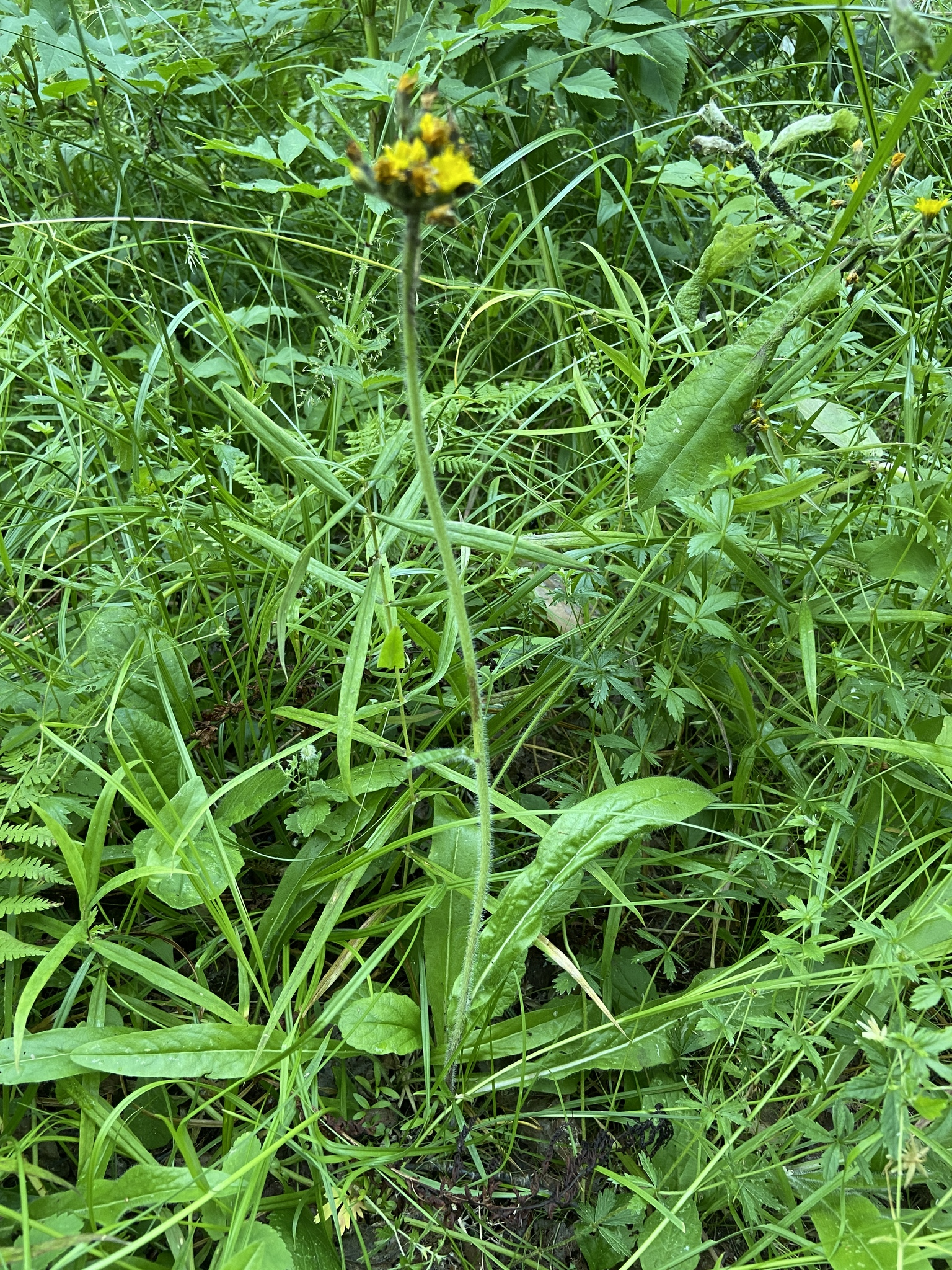

Scientific classification
- Kingdom: Plantae
- Clade: Tracheophytes
- Clade: Angiosperms
- Clade: Eudicots
- Clade: Asterids
- Order: Asterales
- Family: Asteraceae
- Genus: Pilosella
- Species: P. onegensis

Binomial name
- Pilosella onegensis Norrl.

= Pilosella onegensis =

Species of flowering plant

Pilosella onegensis is a species of flowering plant belonging to the family Asteraceae.

Its native range is Europe to Siberia and Turkey.
