= Hot Anger Soon Cold =

16th century lost play written by Henry Chettle, Henry Porter and Ben Jonson

Hot Anger Soon Cold is a play written by Henry Chettle, Henry Porter and Ben Jonson. No extant copies of the play are known.

The play is mentioned in Philip Henslowe's diary for August 1598. On 18 August, the authors were paid £6 for the script by the Admiral's Men.
