= Richard Atkins (martyr) =

Richard Atkins (1559?–1581), was an English Protestant martyr.

Atkins was born at Ross in Herefordshire. Until he was nineteen years old he was a Catholic, after that a Protestant, but for how long is uncertain. About Midsummer 1581 he was at Rome armed with his New Testament. For his language towards the clergy on the 'misorder of their lives', and his denunciations against the Church, he was imprisoned for a short time by the Inquisition. Upon his release he proceeded to a series of acts that finally brought him to torture and the stake.

He was charged with exclaiming against (western) Christianity as it then stood and in particular against the Pope in public places of resort, and with an act of sacrilege in attempting to throw down the sacrament while being carried through the streets by a priest. It was stated that a few days later, he had gone to St Peter's Basilica once again, while diverse gentlemen and others were hearing mass, he stepped forward to the altar 'and threw down the chalice with the wine', and strove to pull the host out of the priest's hand before its consecration. Being committed to prison a second time and examined, his reply was 'that he came purposely to rebuke the popes' wickedness and their idolatry.' After many exhortations by his countrymen to recant, but in vain, he was brought to the stake with many tortures and burned before St. Peter's, 2 August 1581.
