= Emanuel Ford =

Elizabethan romancer

Emanuel Ford (fl. 1607) was an Elizabethan romancer. He was the author of Parismus, in two parts (1598–99), long exceedingly popular, and of the similar romances, Ornatus and Artesia (1607) and Montelion (1633, but probably published earlier).
