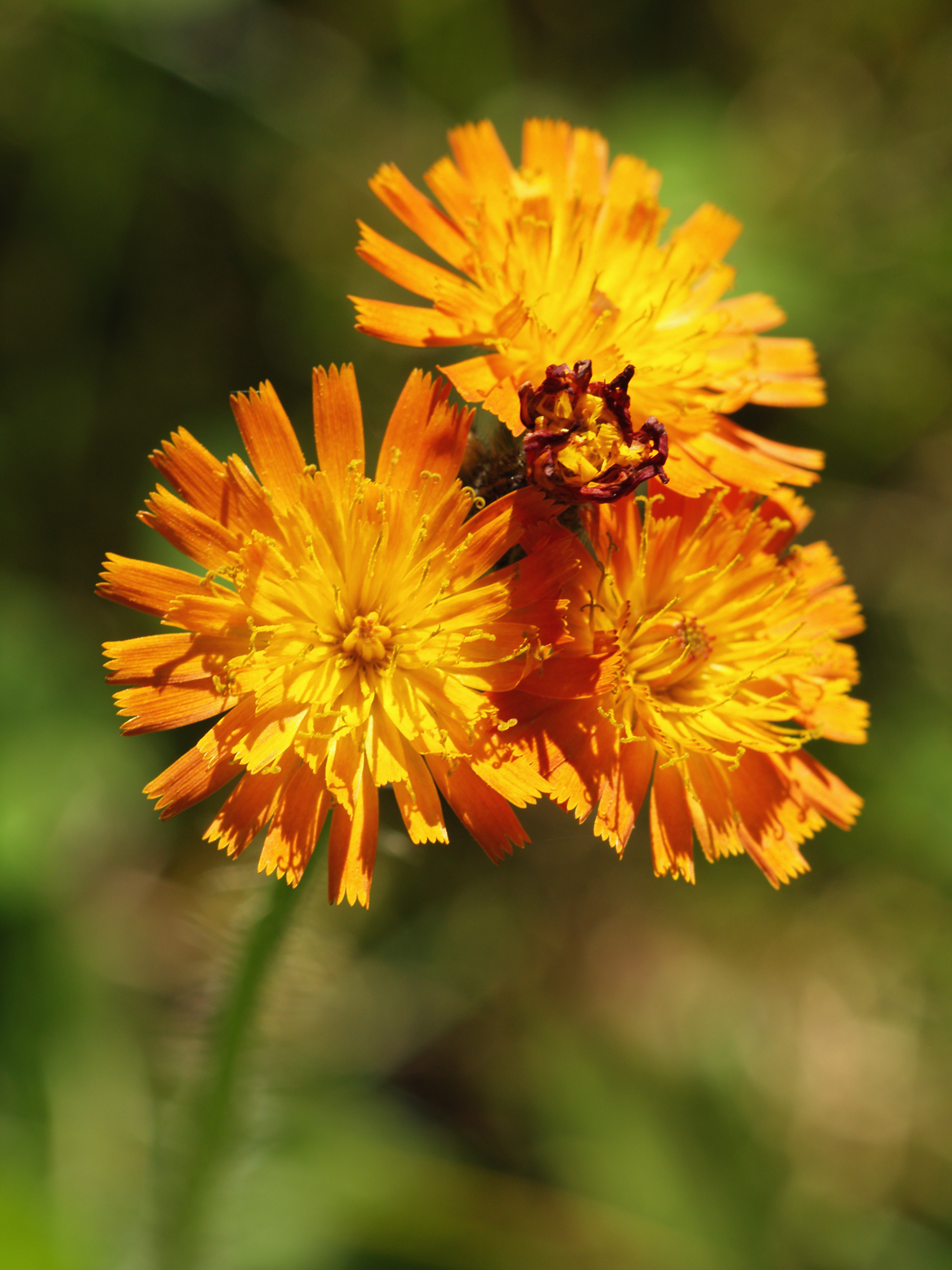

Scientific classification
- Kingdom: Plantae
- Clade: Tracheophytes
- Clade: Angiosperms
- Clade: Eudicots
- Clade: Asterids
- Order: Asterales
- Family: Asteraceae
- Genus: Pilosella
- Species: P. aurantiaca

Binomial name
- Pilosella aurantiaca (L.) F.W.Schultz & Sch.Bip.

Synonyms
- Hieracium aurantiacum L.

= Pilosella aurantiaca =

Species of flowering plant in the daisy family

Pilosella aurantiaca (fox-and-cubs, orange hawkweed, devil's paintbrush, and historically grim-the-collier) is a perennial flowering plant in the family Asteraceae. It is native to mountainous regions of Europe and has been widely introduced elsewhere, where it is invasive in parts of North America, New Zealand, and Australia.

== Description ==
It is a low-growing plant with shallow fibrous roots and a basal rosette of elliptical to lanceolate leaves 5–20 centimetres (2.0–7.9 in) long and 1–3 centimetres (0.39–1.18 in) broad. All parts of the plant exude a milky juice. The flowering stem is usually leafless or with just one or two small leaves. The stem and leaves are covered with short stiff hairs (trichomes), usually blackish in color. The stems may reach a height of 60 centimetres (24 in) and have 2–25 capitula (flowerheads), each 1–2 1/2 cm diameter, bundled together at the end of short pedicels. The flowers are orange, almost red, which is virtually invisible to bees, yet they also reflect ultraviolet light, increasing their conspicuousness to pollinators. The flowers are visited by various insects, including many species of bees, butterflies, pollinating flies. The flowers themselves come in a range of colors from a deep rust-orange to a pure yellow and often show striking gradients of color. In the UK, it flowers in June and July. After flowering, it produces seed heads of the "dandelion clock" type, each individual cypsela (achene-like fruit resembling a seed) being equipped with its own pappus ("parachute") of white or pale brown hairs evolved as a mechanism for wind-dispersal.

The plant propagates through its wind-dispersed seeds, and also vegetatively via the stolons and shallow rhizomes in autumn or spring.

== Taxonomy ==
The Latin specific epithet aurantiaca means 'orange', referring to the usual colour of the blooms. The common name of fox-and-cubs is due to the appearance of the open flowers (the fox) beside the flower buds (the cubs).

== Distribution ==
Pilosella aurantiaca is native to parts of Europe (central, eastern, northern, southeastern and southwestern). It is widely naturalized elsewhere, including other parts of Europe such as Great Britain and Ireland, Central Asia, Canada, many states in the United States, Japan and New South Wales.

== Use in horticulture ==
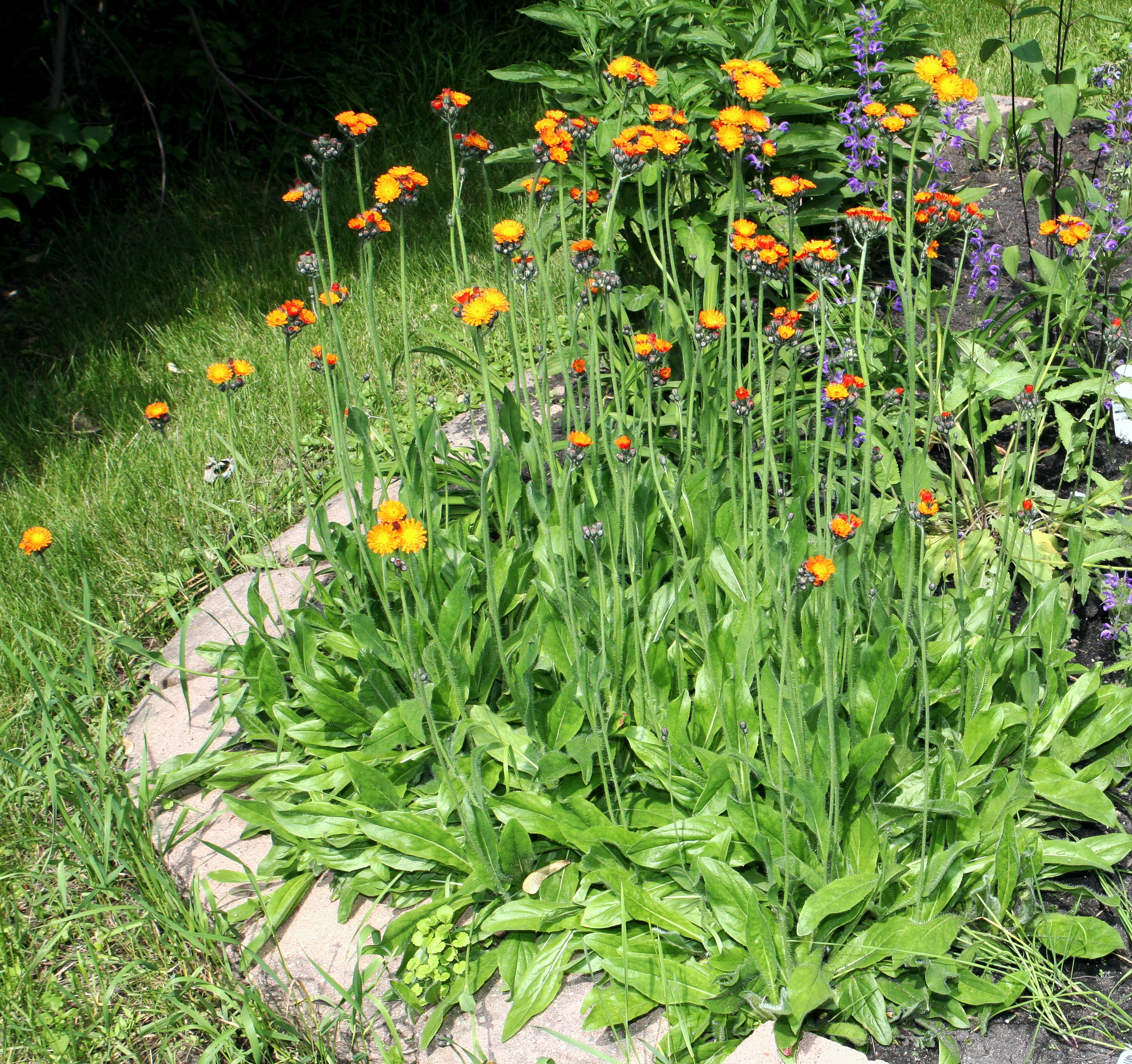
Showing dense habit and flowering

P. aurantiaca is widely grown as an ornamental plant in gardens for its very decorative flowers. It is often used in wildflower gardens because its bright orange flowers are highly attractive to a wide array of pollinators.

== Use in folk medicine ==
Fox and cubs has a long history of use in the folk medicine of Europe, in which it has been used in preparations believed to benefit a variety of diseases, including respiratory infections, digestive problems, and skin conditions. The leaves have also been used to prepare a tisane believed to have tranquilising and sleep-inducing properties. Herbal teas prepared from the leaves and flowers are credited with having diuretic, anti-inflammatory, and antioxidant properties. The plant itself is believed to have some value in the treatment of cancer and has also been employed as a natural remedy for the control of blood sugar levels and the treatment of high blood pressure.

== In myth and folklore ==
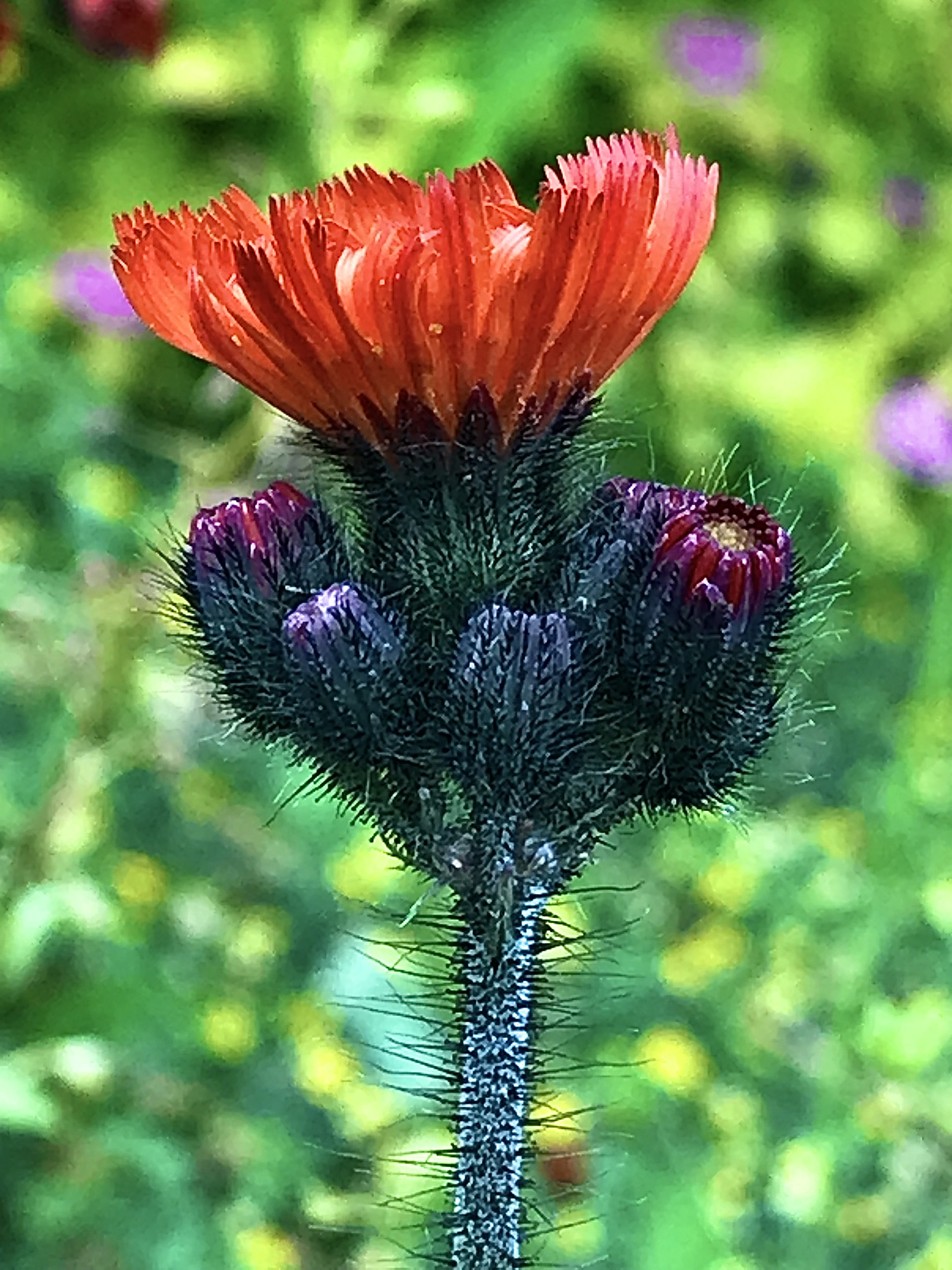
The fiery orange inflorescence of P. aurantiaca, showing to advantage its black hairs reminiscent of coal (or charcoal) dust

Although not native to the British Isles, P. aurantiaca was introduced there at least as early as sixteenth century, as is evidenced by the English common name grim-the-collier, which is that of a folkloric figure of uncertain origin who features in a once-familiar proverb and subsequently in no fewer than three early modern English plays. In one of these he is actually named in the title: "Grim the Collier of Croydon; or, The Devil and his Dame: with the Devil and Saint Dunston". The name Grim was originally a by-name of the Germanic deity Odin/Woden, which came later to be associated, in mediaeval mystery plays with sooty devils blackened by the fires of hell. The term collier can designate not only a coal miner or coal merchant but also a charcoal-burner or charcoal merchant and the town of Croydon in Surrey was formerly noted for the number of its charcoal-burners. The reason for the application of the name of this folk villain to Pilosella aurantiaca is that it has a sooty appearance due the distinctive black hairs in which the flower heads are covered. The proverb linking colliers to the Devil and his fiery abode runs thus: 'like will to like, quoth the devil to the collier' i.e. the Devil and the collier are natural companions thanks to their shared black and sooty appearance. This hellish association between, on the one hand the flower with its black hairs and, on the other, the sooty Devil and his equally sooty friend the coal miner is reinforced by the fiery orange colouration of the flowers, reminiscent of both the flames of a coal fire and the unquenchable flames of hellfire – as further recognised in the plant's common names red devil and devil’s paintbrush.

One website claims that the plant features in Celtic mythology, being believed to possess apotropaic powers employed in magical practices intended to bring good luck and ward off evil spirits. It claims further that in certain (unspecified) cultures, it was planted deliberately around homes and gardens to keep them safe from harm. Kew's definitive Plants of the World Online website states that the plant is not native to Ireland or the U.K. an aspect of its distribution which rules out its featuring in ancient insular Celtic belief but not its playing a role in the mythology of Brittany (P. aurantiaca is native to much of continental Europe – including France).

== Invasive weed ==
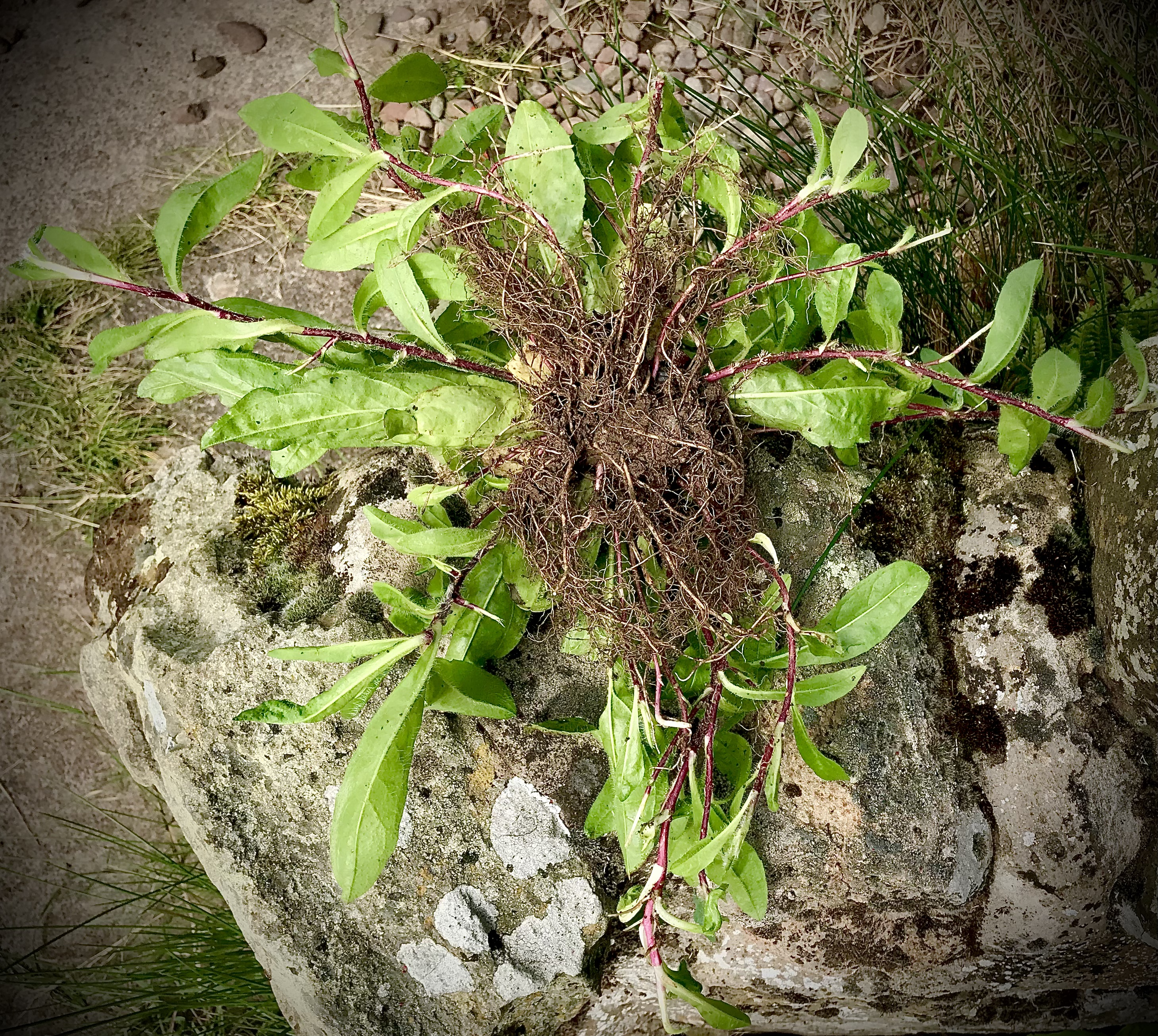
Uprooted rosette, inverted to show purplish, creeping stolons by which the plant can spread rapidly to form large clumps

Orange hawkweed (Pilosella aurantiaca) is currently the only hawkweed considered regionally invasive in areas of British Columbia, Canada. It is considered invasive in the East Kootenay, Central Kootenay, Columbia-Shuswap, Thompson-Nicola, Bulkley Nechako, and Cariboo Regional Districts. Invasive hawkweed can replace native vegetation in open, undisturbed natural areas such as meadows, reducing forage and threatening biodiversity. In Victoria and NSW, Australia, hawkweed species are declared as "State Prohibited Weeds" and are controlled under The Bio Security Act 2015. Orange hawkweed is also considered an invasive species in some states in the United States of America, such as Alaska, Wisconsin and Minnesota. Currently there are several eradication programs operating (often employing volunteers) to locate, prevent the spread of and eradicate any Pilosella or Hieracium plants.
