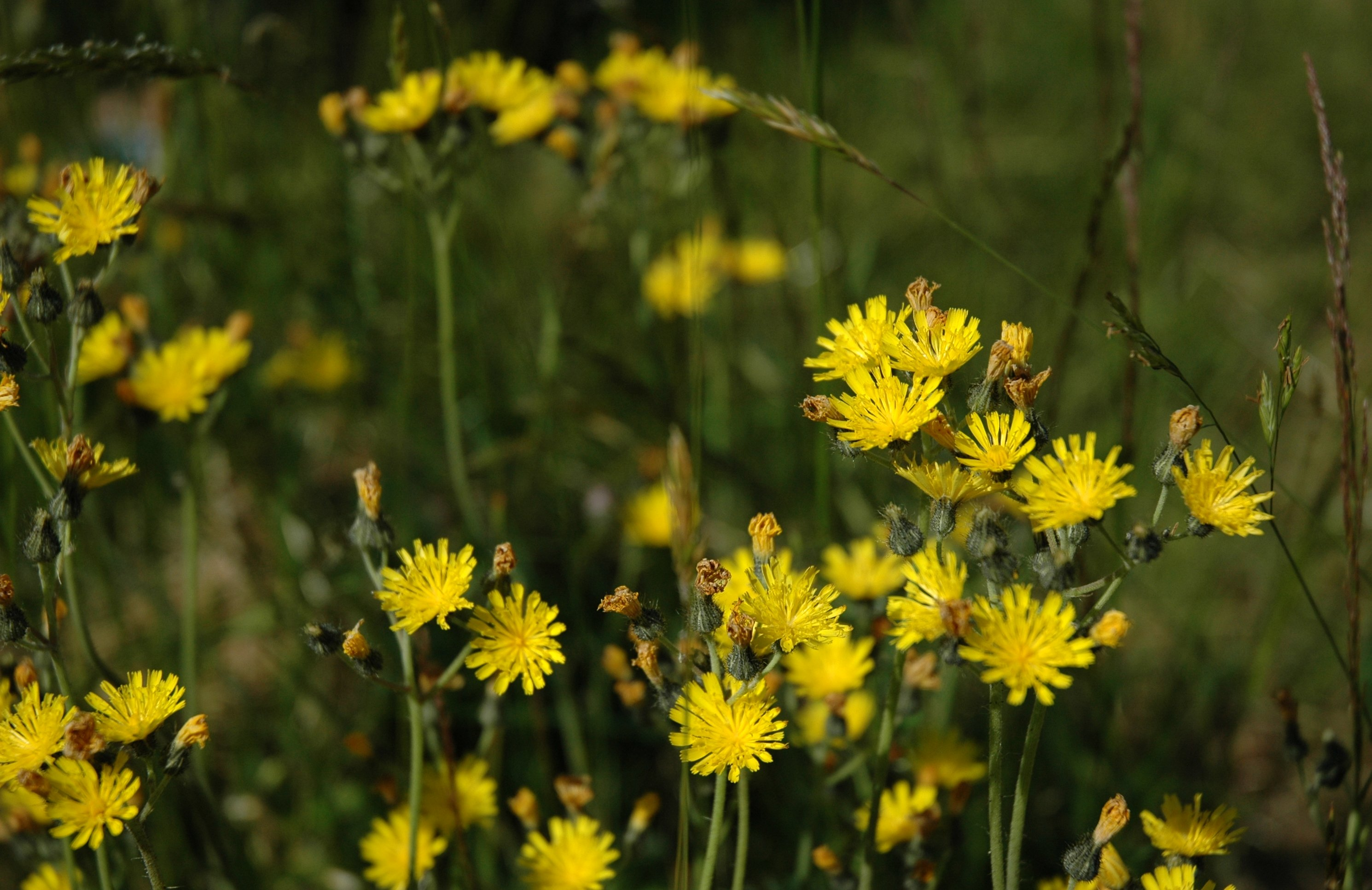

Scientific classification
- Kingdom: Plantae
- Clade: Embryophytes
- Clade: Tracheophytes
- Clade: Angiosperms
- Clade: Eudicots
- Clade: Asterids
- Order: Asterales
- Family: Asteraceae
- Genus: Pilosella
- Species: P. caespitosa

Binomial name
- Pilosella caespitosa (Dumort) P.D.Sell & C.West
- Worldwide distribution

Synonyms
- Hieracium altaicum (Nägeli & Peter) Üksip; Hieracium caespitosum Dumort.; Hieracium colliniforme (Nägeli & Peter) Roffey; Pilosella colliniformis (Naegeli & Peter) Dostál; Hieracium dimorphum Norrl.; Hieracium dissolutum (Nägeli & Peter) Üksip; Hieracium dublanense (Rehmann) Czerep.; Hieracium karelicum Norrl.; Hieracium leptocaulon (Nägeli & Peter) Üksip; Hieracium pratense Tausch; Hieracium rawaruskanum (Zahn) Czerep.; Pilosella altaica (Nägeli & Peter) Schljakov; Pilosella dissoluta (Nägeli & Peter) Schljakov; Pilosella dublanensis (Rehmann) Schljakov; Pilosella karelica Norrl.; Pilosella leptocaulon (Nägeli & Peter) Schljakov; Pilosella pratensis (Tausch) F.W.Schultz & Sch.Bip.; Pilosella rawaruskana (Zahn) Schljakov; Pilosella sudetorum (Naegeli & Peter) Dostál

= Pilosella caespitosa =

Species of flowering plant in the daisy family

Pilosella caespitosa (synonym Hieracium caespitosum, commonly known as meadow hawkweed, yellow hawkweed, field hawkweed, king devil, yellow paintbrush, devil's paintbrush, yellow devil, yellow fox-and-cubs, and yellow king-devil) is like several other Pilosella species and has a similar appearance to many of the hawkweeds.

== Description ==
Pilosella caespitosa is a creeping perennial, with shallow, fibrous roots and long rhizomes.

The leaves, hairy on both sides (unlike Pilosella floribunda, which looks similar but has hair only on the underside), are up to 6 inches (15 centimeters) long, spathulate, and almost exclusively basal with the exception of 1 or 2 very small cauline leaves. The leaves lie flat to the ground, overlap, and will smother non-vigorous turf.

The stems are bristly and usually leafless, although occasionally a small leaf appears near the midpoint. Stems, leaves, and bracts have dense, blackish hairs and exude milky juice when broken.

The 1/2 inch (1 centimeter) flower heads appear in tight clusters at the top of the 1 to 3 foot (1/3 to 1 meter) stems with 5 to 40 flowers per cluster. Corollas are all ligulate and bright yellow. Each single flower head is an inflorescence and each petal forms its own seed, making them each a separate flower or floret.

The seeds are shiny, black, and plumed. After maturing they are dispersed by wind, clothing, hair, feathers, and some vehicles that disturb fields or soils. P. caespitosa persists and regrows each year from rhizomes and often spreads by stolons, which can be extensive, creating a dense mat of hawkweed plants (a colony) that practically eliminates other vegetation.

Pilosella caespitosa prefers silt loam, well-drained soil: coarse textures, moderately low in organic matter, and moist. Its presence can be an indicator of low soil fertility or slightly acidic soils.

Pilosella caespitosa has, in the past, been used for healing eyesight. Pliny the Elder had recorded information regarding how other species, specifically hawks, utilized P. caespitosa, specifically believing that they would eat it in an effort to improve eyesight.

== Habitat and distribution ==
Range throughout North America

Tolerant of drought and trampling, this species finds its habitat where the soil has been neglected. Places like roadsides, neglected residential and commercial landscapes, minimally maintained public parks and open spaces, vacant lots, rubble dump sites, and abandoned grasslands (meadows).

Pilosella caespitosa is an introduced species in North America and can be found in Canada (British Columbia, Manitoba, New Brunswick, Newfoundland, Labrador, Nova Scotia, Ontario, Prince Edward Island, and Quebec) and the United States (Connecticut, Washington, D.C., Georgia, Idaho, Illinois, Indiana, Massachusetts, Maine, Michigan, Minnesota, Montana, North Carolina, New Hampshire, New Jersey, New York, Ohio, Oregon, Pennsylvania, Rhode Island, Tennessee, Virginia, Vermont, Washington, Wisconsin, West Virginia, and Wyoming). It is considered a noxious weed in Idaho, Montana, Oregon and Washington.

Pilosella caespitosa's native range includes a large portion of Europe, including Austria, Belarus, Bulgaria, Czechoslovakia, Estonia, France, Finland, Germany, Greece, Hungary, Latvia, Lithuania, Norway, Poland, Romania, Sweden, Switzerland, Ukraine, and Former Yugoslavia.

== Taxonomy ==
Pilosella caespitosa was originally published by French botanist Barthélemy Charles Joseph Dumortier (Dumort.) in 1827 as Hieracium caespitosum in Fl. Belg.(Dumortier) vol.62. Then in 1967, botanists P.D.Sell & C.West changed it to Pilosella caespitosa in Watsonia 6: 314 (1967).

The species epithet of caespiticia is derived from caespiticius meaning made of turf.

There are 2 known subspecies;

- Pilosella caespitosa subsp. caespitosa (Dumort.) P.D.Sell & C.West
- Pilosella caespitosa subsp. colliniformis (Peter) P.D.Sell & C.West
