= Francisco de Moraes =

Portuguese writer (c. 1500 – 1572)

Francisco de Moraes Cabral
- Born: c. 1500; Bragança, Portugal
- Died: 1572; Évora, Portugal
- Occupations: Writer, secretary

Francisco de Moraes Cabral, also spelled Francisco de Morais Cabral (1500? – 1572), was a Portuguese writer. Born in Bragança, he served as personal secretary to the Portuguese ambassador in France, and composed, during two voyages to Paris (1540 and 1546), a chivalric romance called Palmeirim de Inglaterra; Palmerin of England), a "spin-off" of the popular Amadís de Gaula series.

Moraes' work would also obtain considerable success across Europe. Because of its title, it was particularly successful in England, where it was reprinted several times. A Spanish translation was made by Luis Hurtado in 1547, preceding the actual publication of the Portuguese text in 1567. It was translated from the Portuguese by Eugène-François Garay de Montglave and can be found in Eugène Renduel, Bibliothèque portugaise Warnier, 1829, Paris, 4 vol. It features a distinct plot, well-defined characters, and a commendable style, and has been regarded as a Portuguese classic since its publication.

He also wrote an autobiographical work called Desculpas de uns amores, set in France, which was published posthumously in 1624. He died at Évora.
