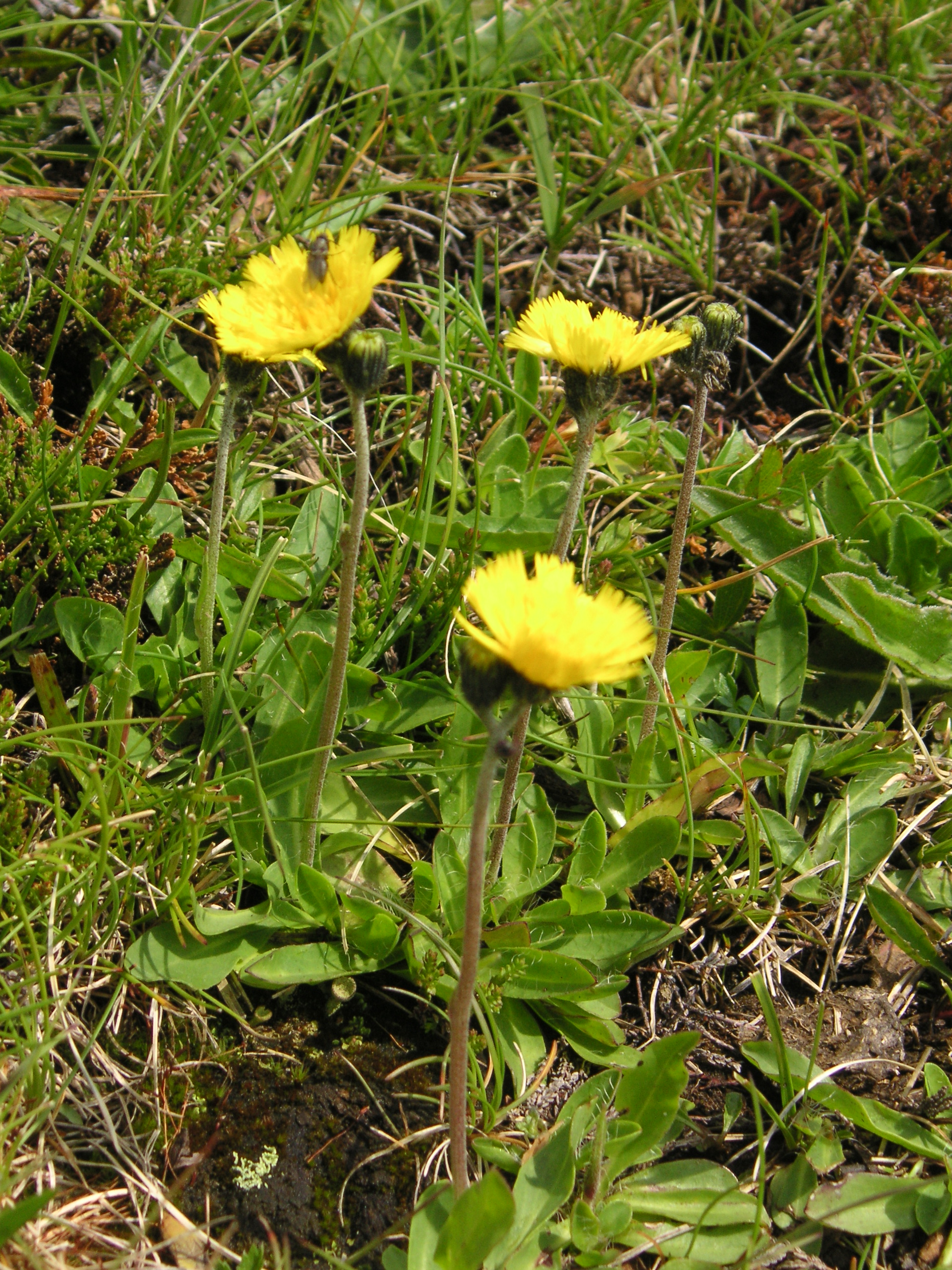

Scientific classification
- Kingdom: Plantae
- Clade: Embryophytes
- Clade: Tracheophytes
- Clade: Angiosperms
- Clade: Eudicots
- Clade: Asterids
- Order: Asterales
- Family: Asteraceae
- Genus: Pilosella
- Species: P. lactucella

Binomial name
- Pilosella lactucella (Wallr.) P.D.Sell & C.West

Synonyms
- Hieracium acutisquamum (Nägeli & Peter) Üksip; Hieracium amaureilema (Nägeli & Peter) Üksip; Hieracium auricula (only some subspecies of P. lactucella); Hieracium kralikii Rouy; Hieracium lactucella Wallr.; Hieracium littuanicum (Nägeli & Peter) Üksip; Hieracium magnauricula (Nägeli & Peter) Üksip; Hieracium magnauricula Zahn; Hieracium micranthum A.Huet ex Nyman; Hieracium nanum Scheele; Hieracium serpyllifolium Fr.; Hieracium tricheilema (Nägeli & Peter) Üksip; Pilosella acutisquama (Nägeli & Peter) Schljakov; Pilosella amaureilema (Nägeli & Peter) Schljakov; Pilosella kralikii (Rouy) J.-M.Tison; Pilosella magnauricula (Naegeli & Peter) Dostál; Pilosella melaneilema (Peter) Schljakov; Pilosella pseudoblyttii Norrl.; Pilosella serpyllifolia (Fr.) F.W.Schultz & Sch.Bip.; Pilosella tricheilema (Nägeli & Peter) Schljakov

= Pilosella lactucella =

Species of flowering plant in the daisy family

Pilosella lactucella (synonym Hieracium lactucella, also called European hawkweed) is a species of perennial plant from the family Asteraceae, found in Europe, New York (United States) and Nova Scotia (Canada). It is 9–20 centimetres (3.5–7.9 in) in height, with stems from 1–2 millimetres (0.039–0.079 in) wide. The leaves are spatula shaped and 5–8 centimetres (2.0–3.1 in) wide. The flowers bloom from May to July, the heads of which are 2–5 centimetres (0.79–1.97 in) tall. It was once described by Carl Linnaeus as Hieracium auricula and Pilosella auricula, but was recategorized by A. E. Roland and M. Zinck in 1998.
