= Henry Chettle =

English pamphleteer and playwright (c. 1564 – c. 1606)

Henry Chettle (c. 1564 – c. 1606) was an English dramatist and miscellaneous writer of the Elizabethan era, best known for his pamphleteering.

== Early life ==
The son of Robert Chettle, a London dyer, he was apprenticed in 1577 and became a member of the Stationer's Company in 1584, traveling to Cambridge on their behalf in 1588. His career as a printer and author is shadowy. He may have set up some of the tracts printed in response to Martin Marprelate. In 1591, he entered into partnership with William Hoskins and John Danter, two stationers. They published a good many ballads, and some plays, including a surreptitious and botched first quarto of Romeo and Juliet, to which it is suggested Chettle added lines and stage directions.

== The Groat's-Worth of Wit ==
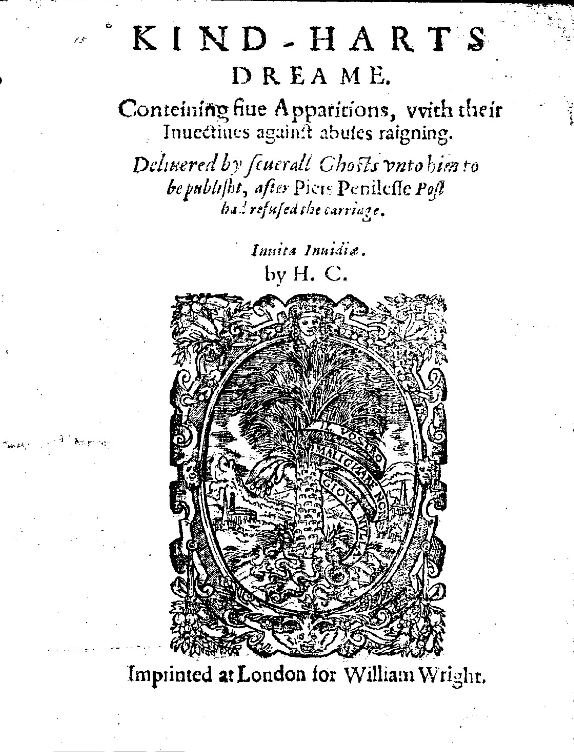
Title page of Kind Hearts Dream by Henry Chettle

In 1592 Greene's Groats-Worth of Wit, supposedly the work of the recently deceased, and very popular, Robert Greene, was published, having been entered in the register of the Stationer's Company "at the peril of Henry Chettle". This contained a passage criticising various playwrights, which offended at least two contemporary writers, one probably the alleged "atheist" Christopher Marlowe and the other possibly William Shakespeare. Chettle was accused of writing the work under Greene's name. He denied the charge in the preface to his Kind Heart's Dream, published later that year:

About three months since died M. Robert Greene, leaving many papers in sundry booksellers' hands, among other his Groatsworth of Wit, in which a letter written to divers play-makers is offensively by one or two of them taken, and because on the dead they cannot be avenged, they willfully forge in their conceits a living author [...] With neither of them that take offence was I acquainted, and with one of them I care not if I never be. The other, whom at that time I did not so much spare as since I wish I had, for that, as I have moderated the heat of living writers and might have used my own discretion (especially in such a case, the author being dead), that I did not I am as sorry as if the original fault had been my fault, because myself have seen his demeanor no less civil than he excellent in the quality he professes. Besides, divers of worship have reported his uprightness of dealing, which argues his honesty, and his facetious grace in writing that approves his art.

The theory that Greene's Groatsworth is a forgery by Chettle has been both supported and challenged by scholars. In 1935 Harold Jenkins attributed the work to Greene, not Chettle. However, a pioneering 1969 computer-aided stylometric analysis by Warren B. Austin firmly attributed it to Chettle. Austin's views were challenged in 2006 by Richard Westley.

== Links to Henslowe ==
He seems to have been generally in debt, judging from numerous entries in Philip Henslowe's diary of advances for various purposes, on one occasion (17 January 1599) to pay his expenses in the Marshalsea prison, on another (7 March 1603) to get his play out of pawn. He made a greater number of small borrowings from Henslowe than any other person. These and Henslowe's casual records of them suggest some friendship between them, though in 1602 Chettle seems to have been writing for both Worcester's Company and the Admiral's, despite signing a bond to write exclusively for the latter.

== Works ==
As early as 1598 Francis Meres includes Chettle in his Palladis Tamia as one of the "best for comedy", and Henslowe lists payments to him for thirty-six plays between 1598 and 1603, and he may have been involved in as many as fifty plays, although only a dozen seem to be his alone. Chettle had regular association with Henry Porter, Thomas Dekker, and after 1600 with John Day. Of the thirteen plays usually attributed to Chettle's sole authorship only one was printed. This was The Tragedy of Hoffmann: or a Revenge for a Father (played 1602; printed 1631). It has been suggested that this piece was put forward as a rival to Shakespeare's Hamlet.

Chettle's non-dramatic writings include (besides Kind Heart's Dream) Piers Plainnes Seaven Yeres Prentiship (1595), the story of a fictitious apprenticeship in Crete and Thrace, and England's Mourning Garment (1603), in which are included some verses alluding to the chief poets of the time.

== Death ==
He died before 1607, when Dekker in his Knight's Conjurer described him joining the poets in Elysium: "in comes Chettle sweating and blowing by reason of his fatness".

== Bibliography ==
- Jenkins, H., The life and work of Henry Chettle (1934)
- Carson, N., A companion to Henslowe's diary (1988)
- Foakes, R. A., and Rickert, R. T., (eds). Henslowe's Diary (1961)
- Smith, Emma (ed). Five Revenge Tragedies [including Hoffman] (2012)

== List of plays ==
1. The Valiant Welchman, by Michael Drayton and Henry Chettle, February 1597-8. Printed in 1615.
2. Earl Goodwin and his Three Sons, Part I, by Michael Drayton, Henry Chettle, Thomas Dekker, and Robert Wilson, March 1598. Not printed.
3. Earl Goodwin, Part II, by the same authors, and under the same date in Henslowe's papers. Not printed.
4. Piers of Exton, by the same authors, same date. Not printed.
5. Black Batman of the North, Part I, by Henry Chettle, April 1598. Not printed.
6. Black Batman of the North, Part II, by Henry Chettle and Robert Wilson. Same date. Not printed. It is mentioned in Henslowe's diary in April 1598. No extant copies of the play are known.
7. The Play of a Woman, by Henry Chettle, July 1598. Not printed.
8. The Conquest of Brute with the first finding of the Bath, by John Day, Henry Chettle, and John Singer. Same date. Not printed.
9. Hot Anger Soon Cold, by Henry Porter, Henry Chettle, and Ben Jonson, August 1598. Not printed.
10. Catiline's Conspiracy, by Robert Wilson and Henry Chettle. Same Date. Not printed.
11. 'Tis no Deceit to Deceive the Deceiver, by Henry Chettle, September 1598. Not printed.
12. Aeneas' Revenge, with the Tragedy of Polyphemus, by Henry Chettle, February 1598-9. Not printed.
13. Agamemnon, by Henry Chettle and Thomas Dekker, June 1599. Not printed. Malone thought that this was the same play as "Troilus and Cressida" before mentioned.
14. The Stepmother's Tragedy, by Henry Chettle, August 1599. Not printed.
15. Patient Grissel, by Thomas Dekker, Henry Chettle, and William Haughton, December 1599. Printed in 1603.
16. The Arcadian Virgin, by Henry Chettle and William Haughton. Same date. Not printed. Mentioned in Philip Henslowe's diary in December 1599.
17. Damon and Pithias, by Henry Chettle, January 1599 – 1600. Not printed.
18. The Seven Wise Masters, by Henry Chettle, Thomas Dekker, William Haughton, and John Day, March 1599 – 1600. Not printed.
19. The Golden Ass and Cupid and Psyche, by Thomas Dekker, John Day, and Henry Chettle, April 1600. Not printed.
20. The Wooing of Death, by Henry Chettle. Same date. Not printed.
21. The Blind Beggar of Bethnal Green, by Henry Chettle and John Day. Same date. Printed in 1659.
22. All is not Gold that Glisters, by Samuel Rowley and Henry Chettle, March 1600. Not printed.
23. Sebastian, King of Portugal, by Henry Chettle and Thomas Dekker, April 1601. Not printed.
24. Cardinal Wolsey, Part I, by Henry Chettle, August 1601. Not printed.
25. Cardinal Wolsey, Part II, by Henry Chettle, May 1602. Not printed.
26. The Orphan's Tragedy, by Henry Chettle, September 1601. Not printed.
27. Too Good to be True, by Henry Chettle, Richard Hathwaye, and Wentworth Smith, November 1601. Not printed.
28. Jane Shore, by Henry Chettle and John Day, March 1602-3. Not printed.
29. Love Parts Friendship, by Henry Chettle and Wentworth Smith, May 1602. Not printed.
30. Tobyas, by Henry Chettle. Same date. Not printed.
31. Jeptha, by Henry Chettle. Same date. Not printed.
32. A Danish Tragedy, by Henry Chettle. Same date. Not printed.
33. Femelanco, by Henry Chettle and ---- Robinson, September 1602. Not printed.
34. Lady Jane, Part I, by Henry Chettle, Thomas Dekker, Thomas Heywood, Wentworth Smith, and John Webster, November 1602. Not printed.
35. Lady Jane, Part II, by the same authors, Smith excepted. Same date. Not printed.
36. The London Florentine, Part I, by Thomas Heywood and Henry Chettle, December 1602. Not printed.
37. The London Florentine, Part II, by the same authors. Same date. Not printed.
38. The Tragedy of Hoffman, by Henry Chettle. Same date. Printed in 1631.
