= Englishmen for My Money =

Stage play by William Haughton

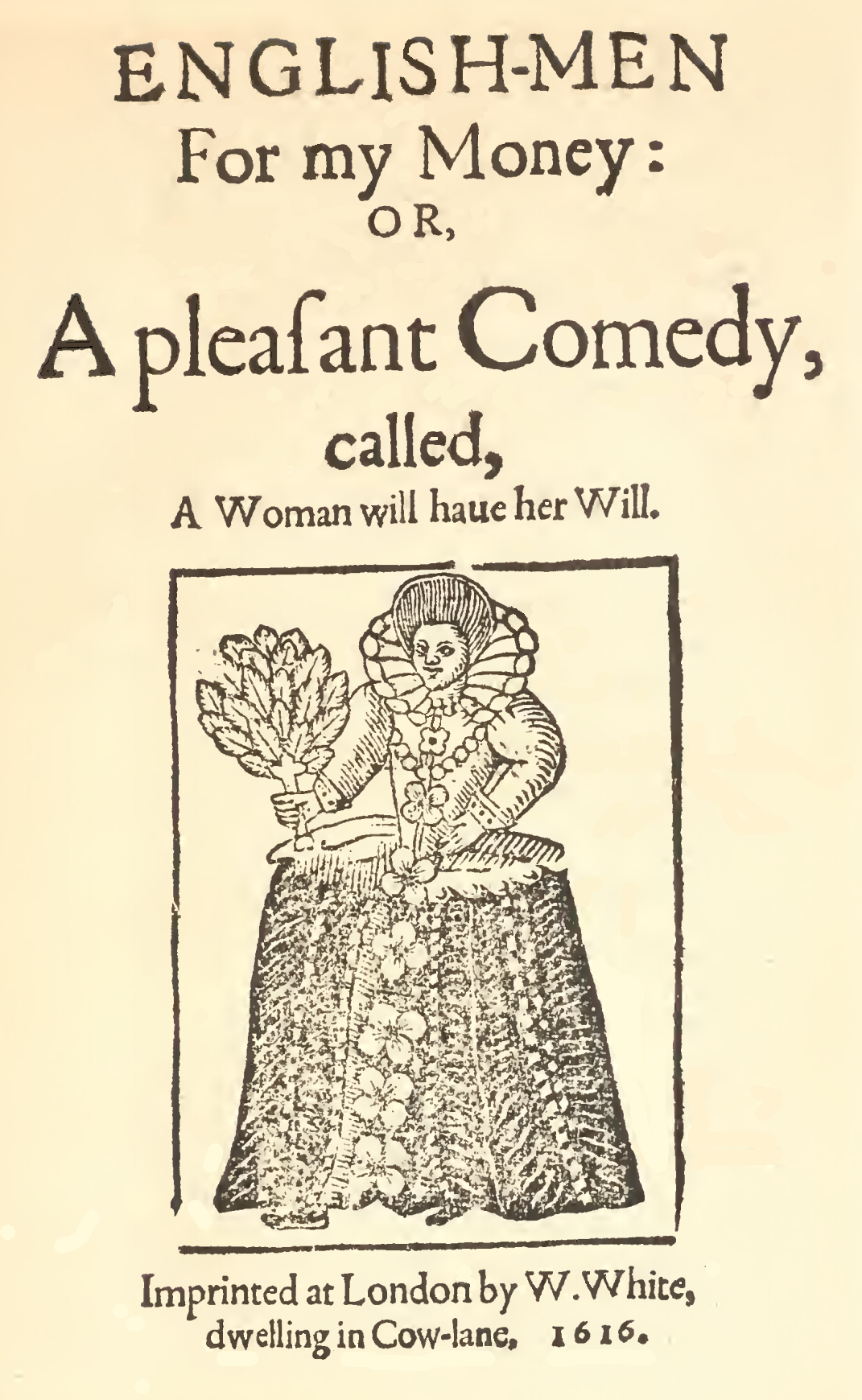
Title page of the 1616 edition by William White

Englishmen for My Money, or A Woman Will Have Her Will is an Elizabethan era stage play, a comedy written by William Haughton that dates from the year 1598. Scholars and critics often cite it as the first city comedy. Indeed, the play inaugurated a dramatic subgenre that would be exploited and developed by Thomas Dekker, Thomas Middleton, Ben Jonson, and others in the following years and decades.

== Performance and publication ==
The records of theater manager and impresario Philip Henslowe show that Haughton received payment for his work on the play between February and May 1598. The play is thought to have been premiered onstage, by the Admiral's Men at the Rose Theatre, before the end of that year.

The work was entered into the Stationers' Register on 3 August 1601, but no published edition survives from before 1616 (which may indeed be the first), when the first known quarto edition was issued by the stationer William White. A second quarto appeared in 1626, printed by John Norton for bookseller Hugh Perry, and a third in 1631, printed by Augustine Matthews for Richard Thrale.

== Plot ==
The play is set within the contemporary merchant class of London, the men who dealt on the Royal Exchange founded by Sir Thomas Gresham. The Portuguese-born merchant and moneylender Pisaro has three half-English daughters, Laurentia, Marina, and Mathea. The daughters face two trios of suitors, one foreign and one domestic. The foreigners are Delion, a Frenchman, Alvaro, an Italian, and Vandal, a Dutchman. Also a foreigner, Pisaro favours these candidates because of their wealth, but his daughters prefer their English suitors, Harvey, Heigham, and Walgrave. The play is rich in linguistic play, courtship scenes, and disguises and cross-dressing, and includes abundant comic material from the clown Frisco. In the end, as the title indicates, the Englishmen win their brides (which importantly helps to cancel the debts they owe to Pisaro).

== Criticism ==
The play displays a popular dislike of Englishwomen being courted by foreigners that is also expressed in Shakespeare's The Merry Wives of Windsor, which was written and acted at about the same time (c. 1597–99). Critics have studied the play for its attitude toward, and treatment of, foreigners in England. Some critics have interpreted the character Pisaro as a Jew; though the word "Jew" is never used in the play, Pisaro compares himself to Judas and is called "Signior Bottle-nose," which has been read as an expression of the anti-Semitism endemic in English and European culture in the period. The most recent edition of Englishmen for My Money presents it as a "usury play" on account of its financial themes.
