= Henry Porter (playwright) =

English playwright (??–1599)

Henry Porter (died June 1599) was an English dramatist who is known for one surviving play, The Two Angry Women of Abington, and for the manner of his death: he was stabbed by another playwright.

== Life ==
Very little is known about Henry Porter's life beyond the entries in the diary of Philip Henslowe the theatre manager. He is described as a "gentleman" and a "poor scholar", and as the play is set in Abingdon, near Oxford, and shows knowledge of the area around Oxford it is assumed he studied there. Attempts to plausibly connect him with the records of the several Henry Porters at Oxford have been fruitless. He is known for one surviving play, The Two Angry Women of Abington, first published in two editions in London in 1599. The Two Angry Women was written before his first recorded work for Henslowe in 1598. Porter was praised by Francis Meres in his Palladis Tamia in 1598 as one of "the best for Comedy amongst us". There is linguistic evidence that he may have contributed comic scenes to Dr. Faustus by Christopher Marlowe.

== Works ==
The Two Angry Women of Abington has been compared favourably in style and quality to The Merry Wives of Windsor. It is a rollicking country piece including two comic characters, Dick Coomes and Nicholas Proverbes, who are advertised in the title page of one original edition. Henslowe records several payments in 1598 for the book and costumes for the play, but it must have been performed before 1599, as there is a reference to these characters in Plaine Percevall, a pamphlet published that year in response to Martin Marprelate.

Henslowe's Diary mentions other plays, Love Prevented (1598), Hot Anger soon Cold, with Henry Chettle and Ben Jonson (1598), the second part of The Two Angry Women of Abingdon (1598), The Four Merry Women of Abingdon (1599), and The Spencers (1599), with Chettle. It is possible that "the second part of the Two Angry Women" was not a separate work, and it is not known whether the later plays were delivered before Porter's death. In 1598 Porter and Chettle were paid 20 shillings by Henslowe to write a play called The Second Part of Black Batman of the North. It has been suggested that some of the money received from Henslowe by Porter was used to pay Chettle's debts. The considerable sums paid to Porter prove that his plays were popular, although the entries suggest he was unreliable. Henslowe notes that the advance to Porter and Chettle was made after Porter "hath geven me his worde for the performance of the same and all so for my money". In February 1599 Henslowe acquired the sole rights of any play in which Porter had a hand, in return for a considerable advance of forty shillings. Porter's borrowings became more frequent, and the sums allowed less.

== Death ==
It is likely that the publication of The Two Angry Women of Abington was prompted by Porter's death. The last definite record of him is an IOU in his hand in Henslowe's diary on 26 May 1599. Leslie Hotson discovered the record of a case in the Southwark Assizes, which records the death of a Henry Porter on 7 June 1599 in Southwark. He is recorded as having been struck a mortal wound in the left breast with a rapier "of the value of two shillings" the previous day. The killer is named as John Day, almost certainly the playwright of that name, who worked for Philip Henslowe. Although collaboration was common there is no record of Porter and Day working together. Ben Jonson, with whom Porter did collaborate, described Day as a "rogue" and a "base fellow". Day was charged with murder, but admitted manslaughter, on the grounds of self-defence, his plea in formal terms being that "he fled to a certain wall beyond which, etc". Although it is not recorded he seems to have obtained a Royal Pardon.

The rapier was a fashionable but particularly dangerous weapon, more likely to cause death than traditional swords. It is ironic that one of the characters in The Two Angry Women laments "this poking fight of a rapier and dagger" saying that "a good sword-and-buckler man will be spitted like a cat or a coney". The irony would be greater still if the author of this was the same Henry Porter granted a "Pardon de se defendendo."

There are parallels between the deaths of Henry Porter and his fellow playwright Christopher Marlowe: both were stabbed to death south of the Thames in London, Marlowe in Deptford in 1593, and Porter in Southwark in 1599; both deaths were explicated in modern times by Leslie Hotson.
