= Chloris (disambiguation) =

Chloris is the name of several figures in Greek mythology. The name can also refer to:

- Chloris (plant), a genus of grasses
- Chloris (bird), a genus of birds known as the greenfinches
- Parula, a genus of birds that has invalidly been called Chloris
- 410 Chloris, an asteroid
- Chloris family, an asteroid family named after its principal body, 410 Chloris
- Chloris, the pseudonym of Jean Lorimer (1775–1831) with the songs of Robert Burns
- Chloris (1596), a sonnet sequence by William Smith

== See also ==
- Cloris Leachman (1926–2021), American actress
