= John Lewars =

Scottish land surveyor (1769–1826)

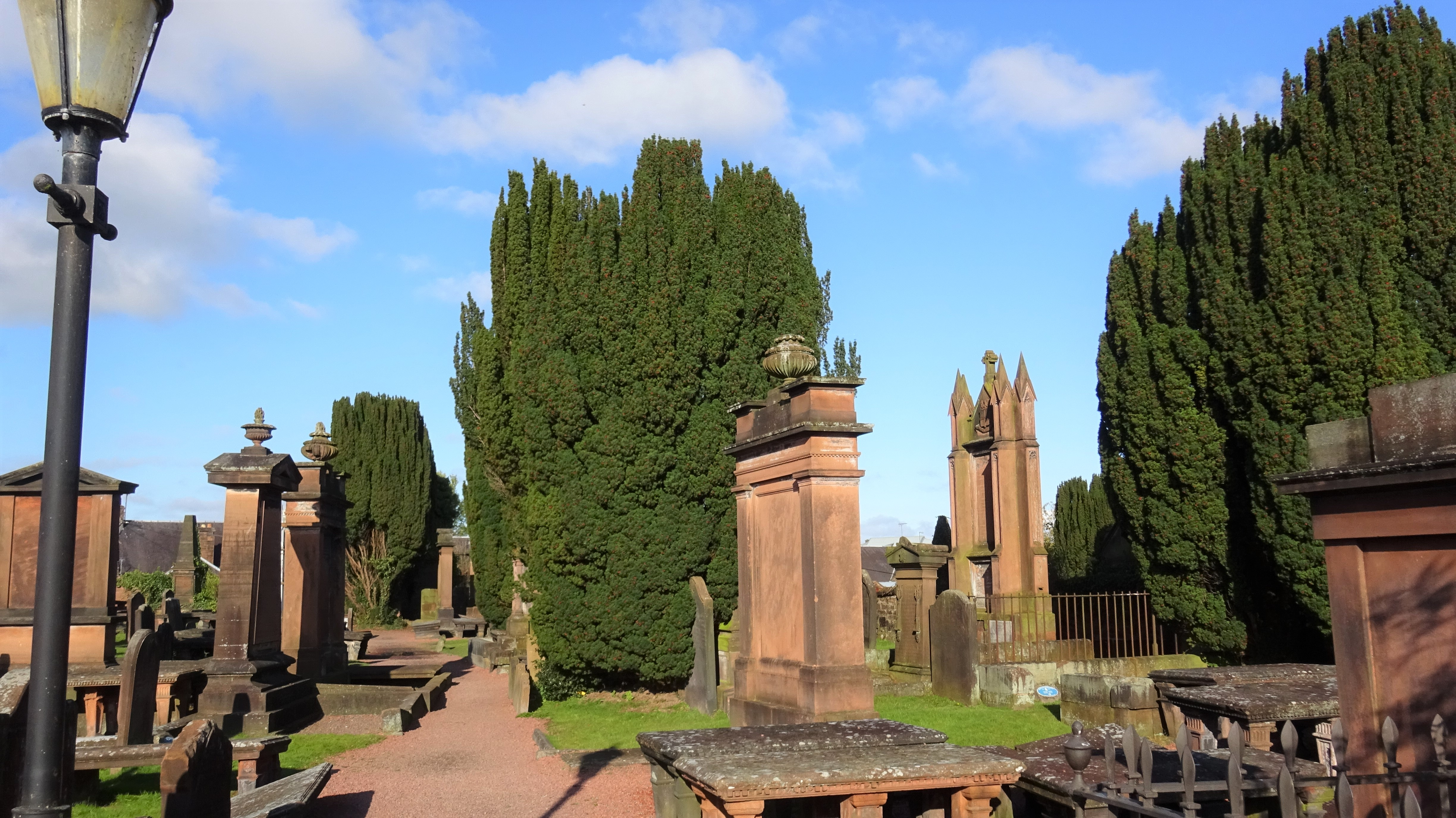
- St Michael's Graveyard, Dumfries
- Born: 1769
- Died: 1826; Dumfries
- Occupations: Excise Officer and Land Surveyor

John Lewars (1769–1826) was an excise officer and land surveyor. He was one of Robert Burns's colleagues and friends during his Nithsdale and Dumfries days. Lewars moved with his sister Jessie Lewars in around 1793 to a house in Millhole Brae (now Burns Street) that lay immediately opposite that of Robert Burns in Dumfries. Jessie Lewars was a very close Burns family friend and helped the family by nursing Robert in the days leading up to his death, doing the domestic chores and caring for the children.

== Life and character ==
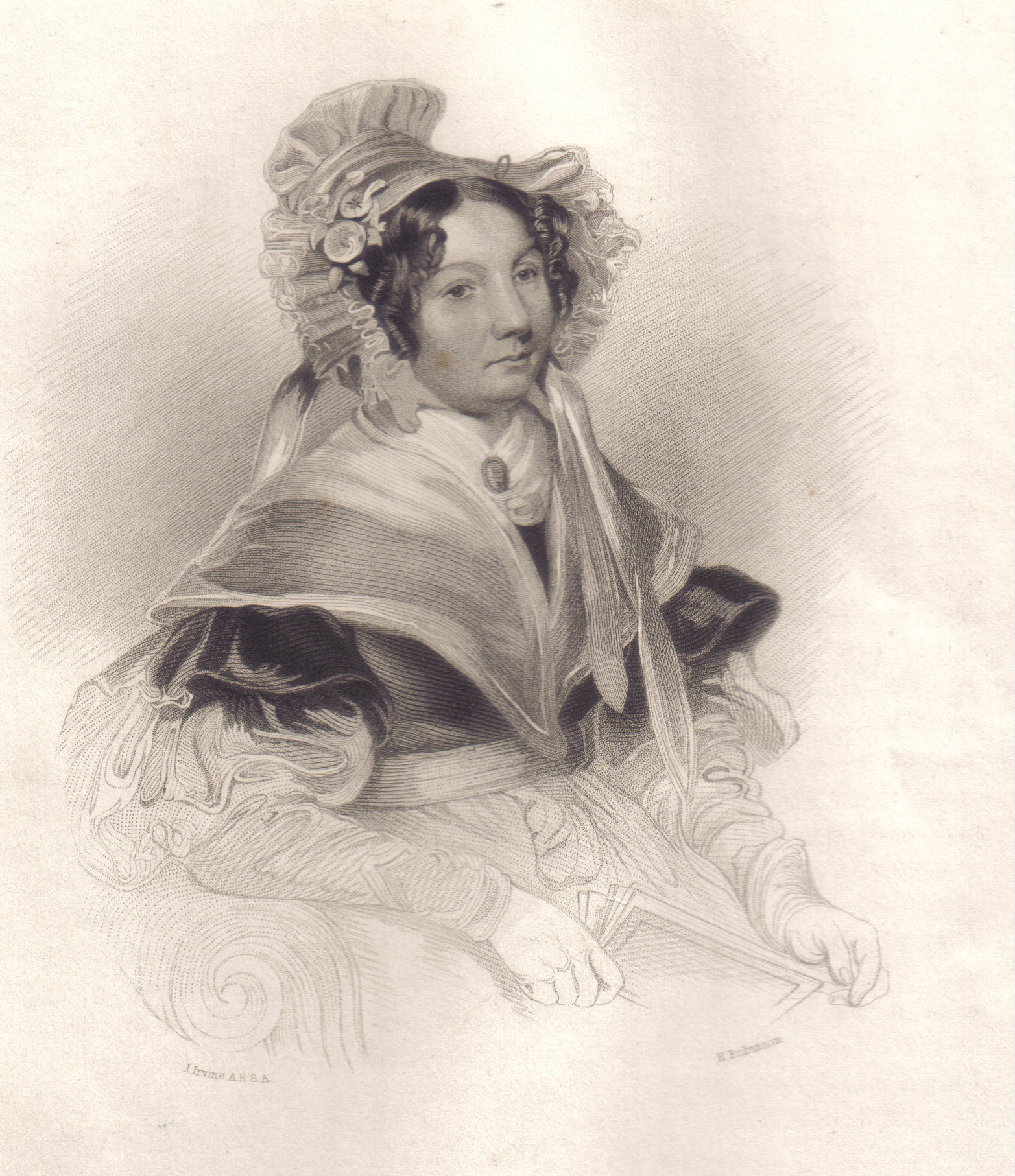
Jessie Lewars

John's father, also John Lewars, had been a supervisor of excise in Dumfries until his death on 22 April 1789. Mary and Jessie were the sisters of John Lewars junior. Mary married a local builder, William Hyslop.

In 1799 Lewars married Barbara Howe of Gretna and the couple had two children.

Lewars died at Ryedale Cottage, Troqueer, aged 57. He was buried in St Michael's cemetery in Dumfries, close to the original burial place of Robert Burns, later the lair of Mrs Agnes Eleanor Perochon, daughter of Frances Dunlop.

== Association with Robert Burns ==
Burns, ten years the senior of Lewars, described Lewars as ".. a particular friend of mine" and " .. a young man of uncommon merit".

It is likely that Burns composed the following verses in 1796 in response to one of Lewars' love affairs. 'Woods' is unidentified, although John Syme (1755 - 1831) - a mutual friend, wrote on the poet's holograph manuscript that she was an assistant to Miss McMurdo at a local girls boarding school. The poem has Lewars bewitched by the young women and his heart is stolen and Burns links this the heroines supernatural powers. Lewars was also an admirer of Jean Lorimer, Burns's 'Chloris'.

Burns added a comment "A poor man ruined and undone by Robbery and Murder. Being an awful WARNING to the young men of this age, how they look well to themselves in this dangerous, terrible WORLD."

The Hue and Cry of John Lewars

A thief, and a murderer! Stop her who can!
Look well to your lives and your goods!
Good people, ye know not the hazard you run,
'Tis the far-famed and much-noted Woods.

While I looked at her eye, for the devil is in it,
In a trice she whipt off my poor heart:
Her brow, cheek and lip - in another sad minute,
My peace felt her murderous dart.

Her, features, I'll tell you them over - but hold!
She deals with your wizards and books;
And to peep in her face, if but once you're so bold,
There's witchery kills in her looks.

But softly - I have it - her haunts are well known,
At midnight so slily I'll watch her;
And sleeping, undrest, in the dark, all alone
Good lord! The dear thief how I'll catch her!

After Robert Burns's death Lewars undertook many of the essential tasks, writing letters to friends and relatives informing them of the poet's death.

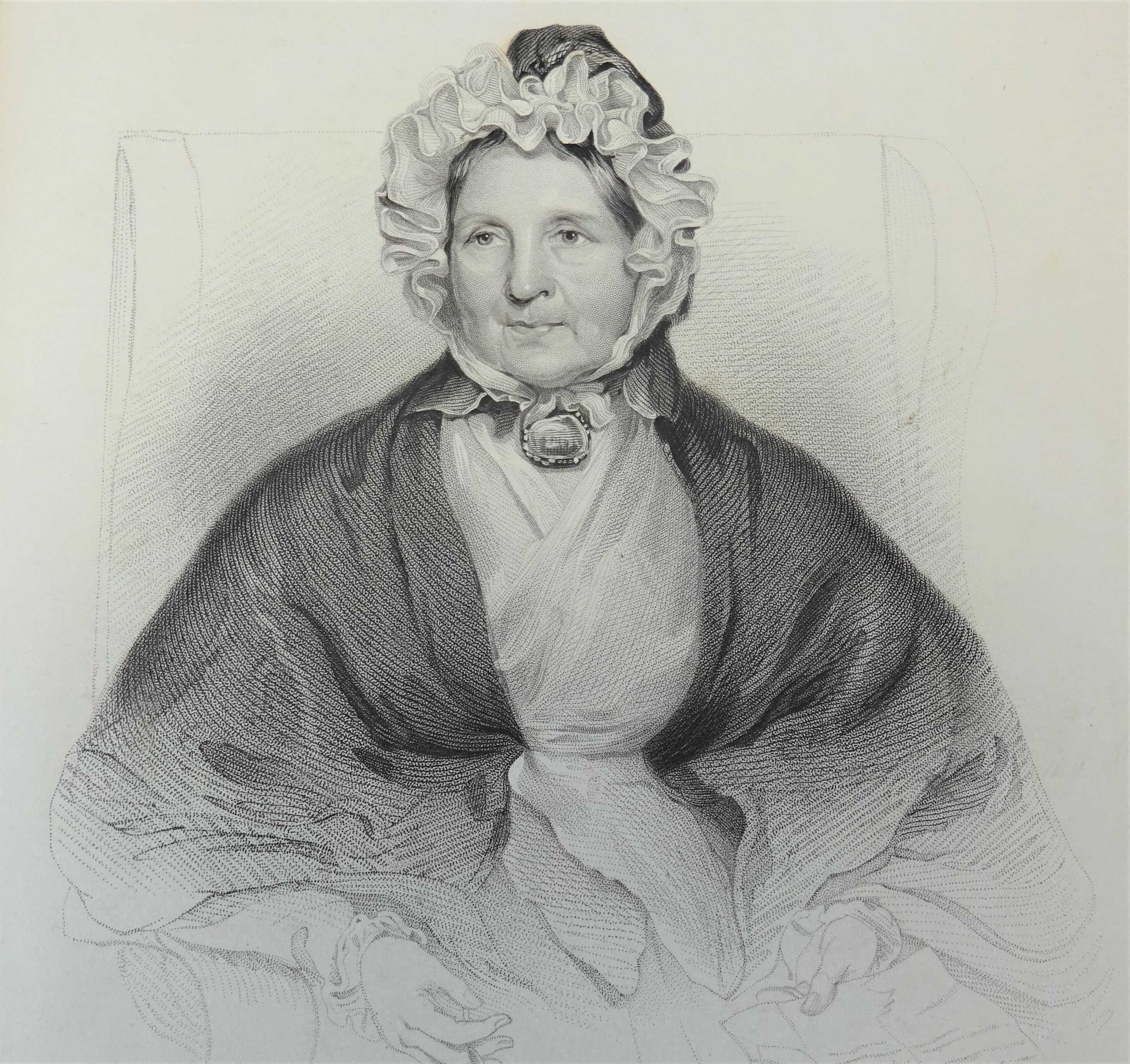
Frances Anna Dunlop

Lewars' letter to Mrs Dunlop, written on the day following the poet's death, 22 July 1796, contains the only evidence that Frances had at last replied to Burns's many unanswered letters.

Madam, At desire of Mrs Burns I have to acknowledge the receipt of your letter, and at same time to inform you of the melancholy and much-regretted event of Mr Burns's death. He expired on the morning of the 21st., after a long and severe illness. Your kind letter gave him great ease and satisfaction, and was the last thing he was capable of perusing or understanding. The situation of his unfortunate widow andfamily of most promising boys, Mrs Dunlop's feelings and affection for them will much easier paint than I can possibly express, more particularly when Mrs Dunlop is informed that Mrs Burns's situation is such that she is expected to ly-in dayly. I am certain that a letterfrom Mrs Dunlop to Mrs Burns would be a very great consolation, and her kind advice most thankfully received.

Lewars also wrote to William Nicol to inform him of Burns's death. Nicol responded at length after a delay, caused by illness.

=== The Jean Murdoch and Janet Anderson Incident ===
On 17 May 1792 Lewars and Robert Burns had been drinking into the early hours and decided to clear their heads with a walk beside the Nith. They walked along the Waterside footpath, now Waterloo Street in Dumfries. This path passed doors used by domestic servants and tradesmen. At 5am Jean Murdoch, servant to Wellwood Maxwell was washing clothes with Janet Anderson in a wash house at the foot of Maxwell's garden. Lewars spotted the girls, hammered on the door and upon the women refusing to unlock the door he put his shoulder to it and entered the wash house. Lewars became abusive when the women told him to leave, uttering obscene language and upon Jean threatening Lewars with a container of boiling water, Lewars threw a crockery vessel full of soap suds that hit Jean. Lewars then physically attacked Jean, scratching and bruising her left arm, neck and breast. When Jean asked Janet to fetch Wellwood, Lewars knocked her head against a wall and threatened to duck them both in the cauldron of boiling water. Burns, who had been standing in the lane, asked the women who the house owner was and managed to get Lewars into the lane, begging the women not to report what had happened.

Lewars was charged with "crimes of a heinous nature" and was defended against the charges by Francis Shortt, Town Clerk of Dumfries. The case was abandoned and Lewars afterwards led a blameless and totally respectable life.

Lewars joined Robert Burns in the ranks of the Royal Dumfries Volunteers, enrolling at their second meeting in January 1795. John Syme, Burns and Lewars were part of the Second Company of the volunteers.

== Career ==
=== The Rosamond Incident and Excise Duties ===
Lewars, aged twenty, joined the Excise as a gauger at Linlithgoe on 26 December 1789. In 1799 Lewars was transferred to the lst Itinerancy, Burns' old circuit, involving some two hundred miles per week on horseback. Records also reveal that Lewars was reprimanded in 1795 with no reason given.

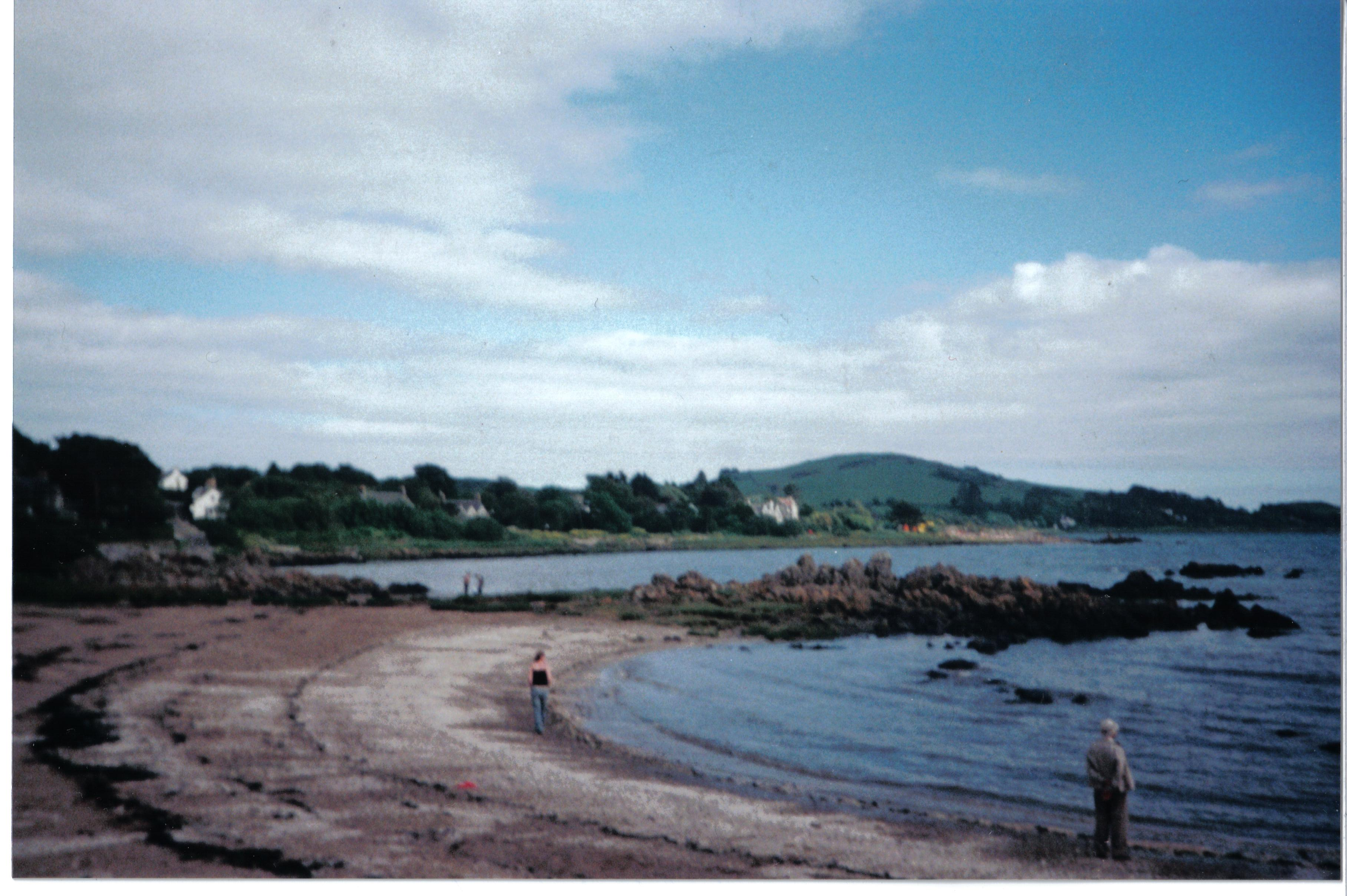
The Solway Firth

Lewars, Burns and Walter Crawford were three Excise Officers involved in the Rosamond incident on 29 January 1792. This 100 ton schooner was used by smugglers along the shallow waters of the Solway and after becoming grounded Lewars and Crawford were dispatched to Dumfries to fetch assistance in the form of more dragoons. The ship's cargo was intact and the story is that Burns purchased four four-pound carronades at the ship's sale and attempted to send them to the French army. Joseph Train is said to have obtained documents pertaining to the incident from Lewars' widow and he passed them to Sir Walter Scott. Those written by Lewars detailing the carronade story have not been recovered however a search of the Abbotsford archives revealed a ship's inventory written by Lewars, listing the sails, spars, rigging and furnishings, with a brief summary of the amounts realised in the auction.

When Burns was serving as an Acting Supervisor of Excise Lewars covered Burns stead and Adam Stobie covered Lewars' division.

Lewars in circa April 1792 appeared on a list of Excise Officers that were ranked as being above average ability. Lewars colleagues, Robert Burns, Walter Crawford and William Penn were also annotated as belonging to this category.

In 1793 Walter Crawford was divorced by his wife and testimony about his promiscuity was given by Lewars and a colleague, John Rankine.

After leaving the Excise Lewars then returned, apparently as a relief supervisor at Kincardine on Forth in 1817, Linlithgow in 1817, Dunkeld in 1818, Inverary in 1818, Montrose in 1819 and finally Dumfries from 1820 to 1824 when he retired on a pension of £160 per annum.

=== Land Surveyor and farming ===
In 1807, after leaving the excise, he rented Lauder Farm at Caerlaverock, however by 1817 he had returned to work for the Excise. John Syme described Lewars as a Land Surveyor. It was common amongst excisemen to have a second job and it seems that Lewars augmented his excise income by undertaking surveying work. A manuscript in Dumfries Burgh Records is recorded as a "Proposal by J. Lewars for publishing a map of the Town and Borough Roads of Dumfries, 1796 / 16 May 1796. Read in Council to lye on the table." A plan of the River Nith dated 1808 is held by National Library of Scotland.

== See also ==
- Robert Aiken
- Jean Armour
- John Ballantine
- Lesley Baillie
- Alison Begbie
- Nelly Blair
- Isabella Burns
- May Cameron
- Mary Campbell (Highland Mary)
- Jenny Clow
- Gavin Hamilton (lawyer)
- Helen Hyslop
- Nelly Kilpatrick
- Jessie Lewars
- William Nicol
- Anne Rankine
- Isabella Steven
- Peggy Thompson
