= Jessie Lewars =

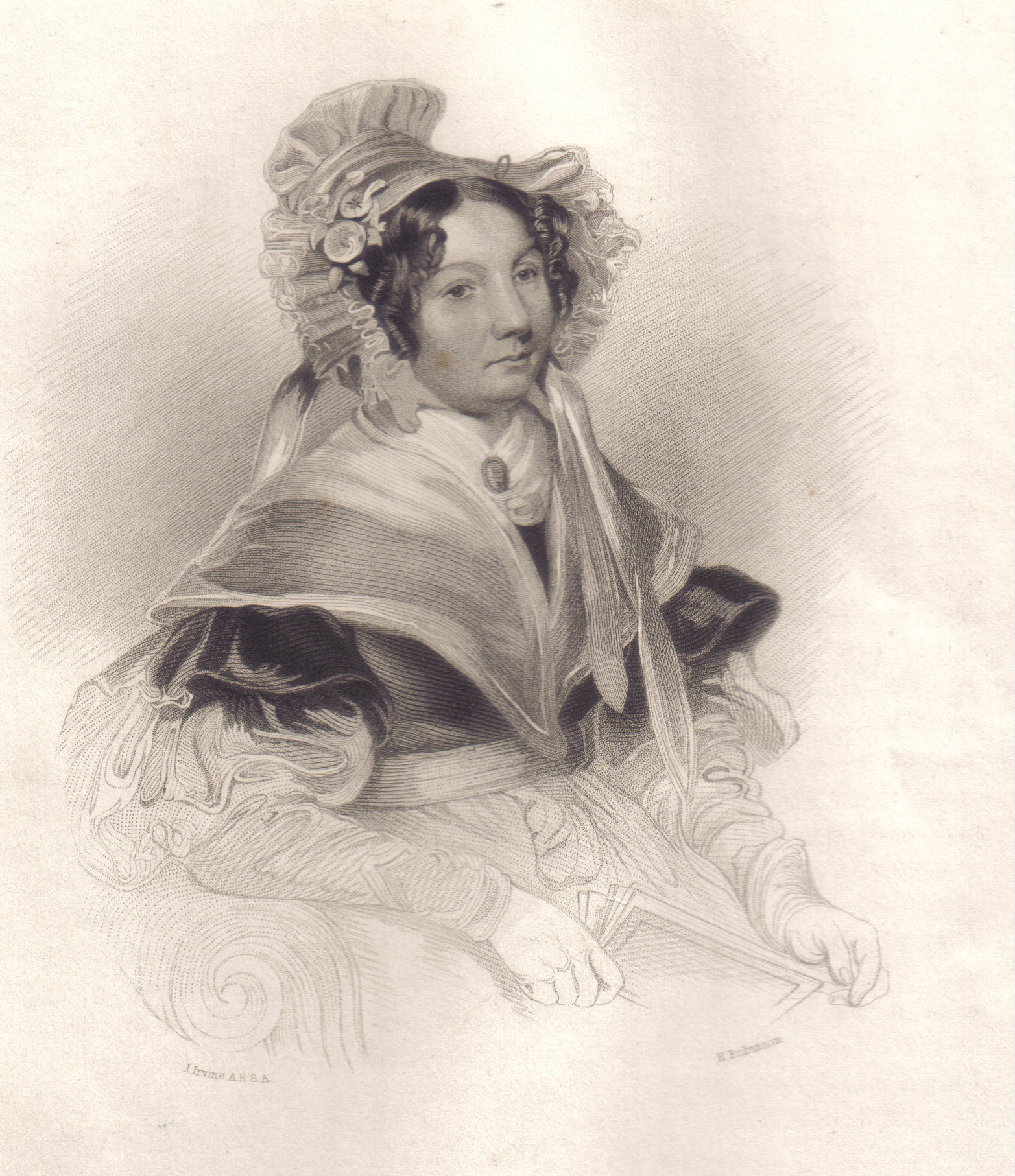
- Jessie Lewars
- Born: 1778; Dumfries, Scotland
- Died: 26 May 1855 (aged 76–77); Maxwelltown, Scotland
- Occupation: Housewife

Jessie Lewars, also known as Mrs. James Thomson, was the youngest daughter of John Lewars, a supervisor of excise. Following the death of her 69-year-old father in 1789, Jessie was only 11 years old, when she and her brother John moved to a house in Millhole Brae (now Burns Street) that lay opposite that of Robert Burns in Dumfries. Jessie was a close Burns family friend and when nearly at the age of eighteen helped the family by nursing Robert in the days leading up to his death and doing the domestic chores.

== Life and character ==
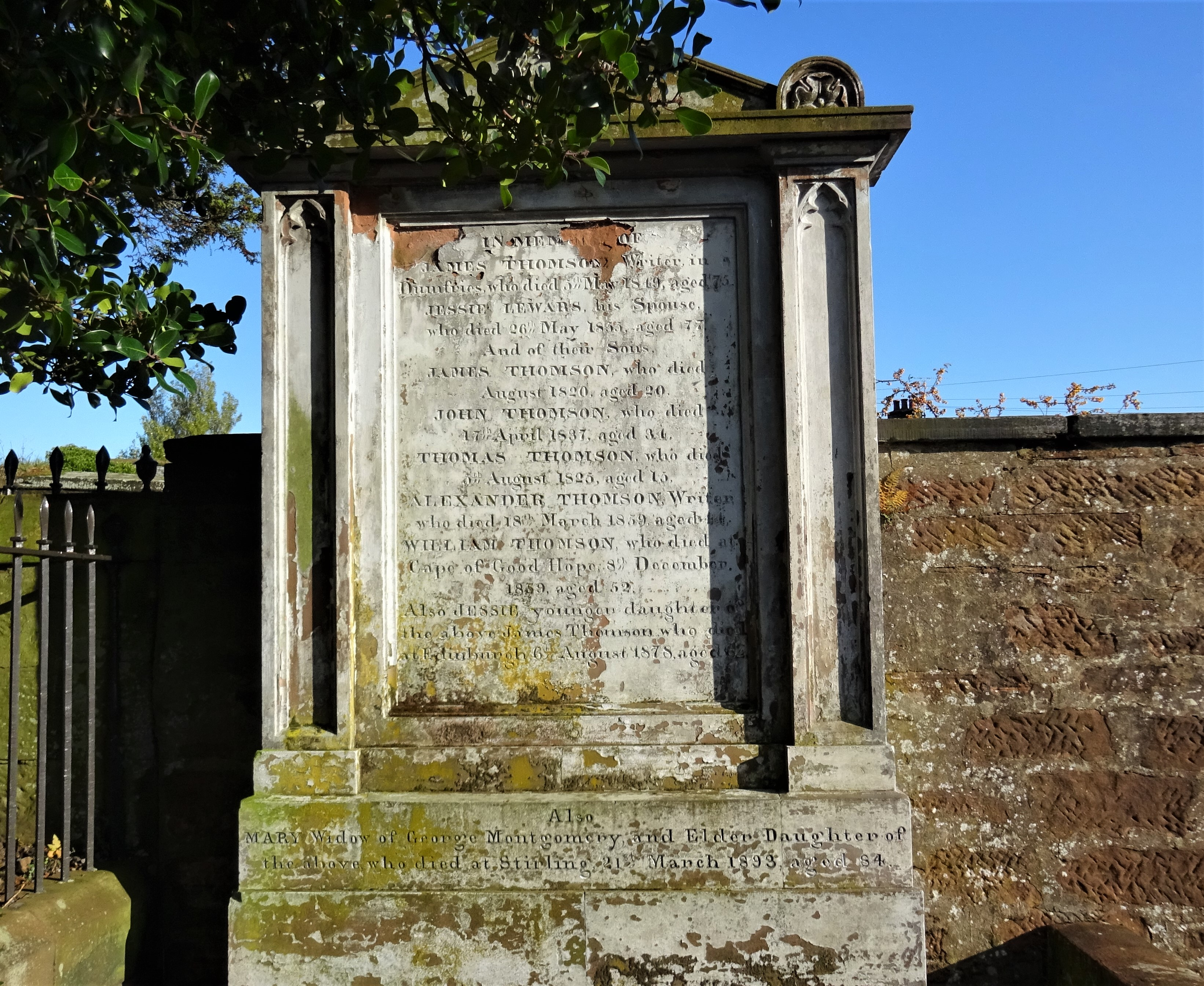
Jessie Lewars gravestone, St Michael's, Dumfries.

Jessie had a brother and also an older sister, Mary, who married William Hyslop, a Dumfries builder. As teasingly predicted by Robert Burns, Jessie married James Thomson, a lawyer or solicitor, in Dumfries on 3 June 1799. The couple had five sons and two daughters. The sons were James (1800–1820); John (1802–1834), who worked with his father; William (1805–1858), who was a captain in the merchant service, and died at the Cape of Good Hope; Thomas (1810–1859); and Alexander (1814–1859.

The elder daughter, Mary (1807–1843), married George Montgomery in 1840, a Dumfries merchant. They had a son, George, and a daughter, Jessie Lewars Montgomery. Jessie, younger daughter of James Thomson and Jessie Lewars, was born on 16 June 1816 and died unmarried in September 1877.

Jessie lived in Dumfries at Maxwelltown, for the remainder of her life, dying at the age of 77 on 26 May 1855; her husband, James Thomson, having died on 5 May 1849, aged 75. Jessie and her husband were buried in a grave situated opposite to the Robert Burn's mausoleum in Saint Michael's churchyard, Dumfries.

For a time John, her brother, was one of Burns colleagues in the Excise, including John Gillespie, who were romantically linked with Jean Lorimer, Burns's "Chloris".

=== Association with Robert Burns and his family ===
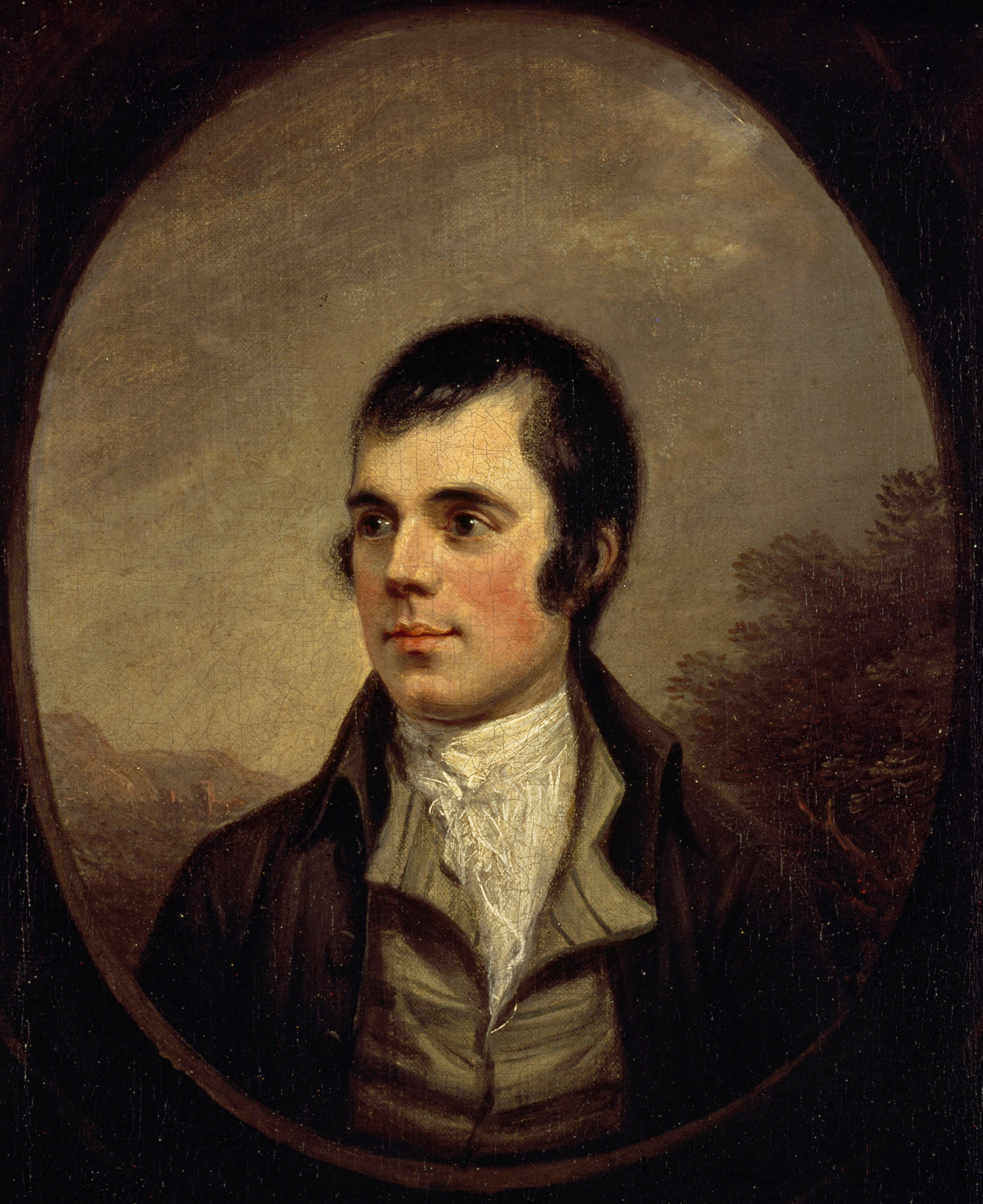
Full view of the Naysmith portrait of 1787, Scottish National Portrait Gallery

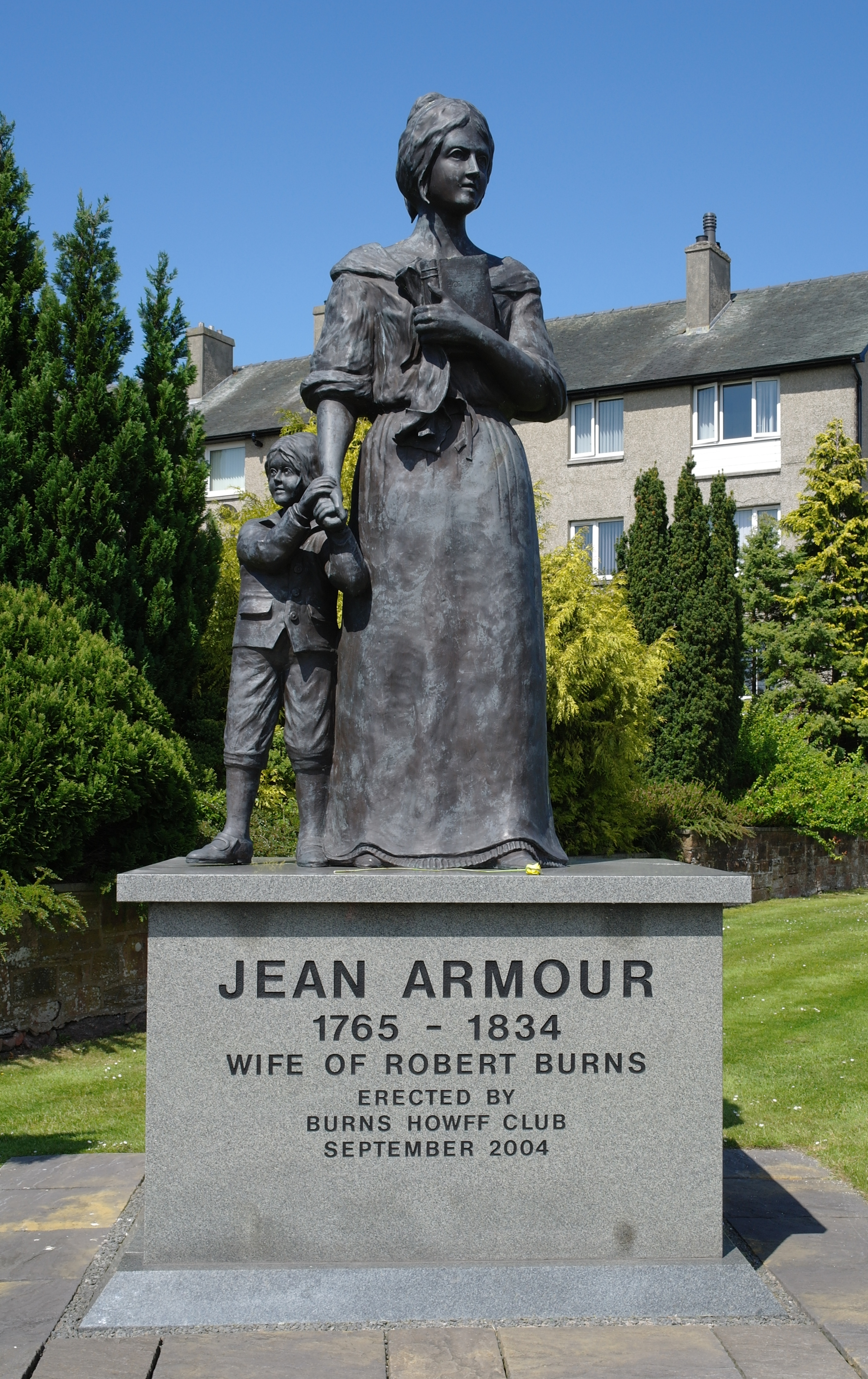
Jean Armour.

John Lewars, Jessie's brother, was a colleague of Robert Burns in Dunfriesshire until his death in 1796 and gave official instruction to the Poet on his joining the service.

Jessie not only nursed Robert Burns during his final illness, but also looked after his young family of four boys until his wife, Jean, had recovered from the birth of her last child, Maxwell Burns. Young Robert actually remained living with her for nearly a year. Jessie played and sang to Robert whilst he lay in his sickbed, for Burns was rarely able to leave his room from April 1796, until his death in July of that year. She is said to have had a fine singing voice that Burns compared to a Linnet (Carduelis cannabina). He became very fond of Jessie and composed his very last song for her, namely "O wert thou in the cauld blast." after hearing Jessie sing a popular song, known as "The Robin cam' to the Wren's Nest"; Felix Mendelssohn also set this to his own haunting music. He also addressed to Jessie the song "Altho' thou maun never be mine."

When she was briefly ill or indisposed Robert offered to write an epitaph to her on a crystal goblet, saying in jest "In case of the worst, Jessy, let me provide you with an epithaph":-

Jessie's Illness
Say, sages, what's the charm on earth
Can turn Death's dart aside?
It is not purity and worth,
Else Jessie had not died!

Her Recovery
But rarely seen since Nature's birth
The natives of the sky!
Yet still one seraph's left on earth,
For Jessie did not die.

He also wrote a rhymed toast to her on another crystal goblet containing wine and water using a diamond pen and requested that she regard it as a keepsake for life:

The Toast
Fill me with the rosy wine;
Call a toast, a toast divine;
Give the Poet's darling flame;
Lovely Jessie be her name:
Then thou mayest freely boast
Thou hast given a peerless toast.

Robert wrote the following tribute to Jessie on the back of a menagerie handbill that she kept for the rest of her life:

Talk not to me of savages
From Afric's burning sun:
No savage e'er can rend my heart,
As Jessie thou hast done.

But Jessie's lovely hand in mine,
A mutual faith to plight,
Not even to view the Heavenly choir
Would be so blest a sight.

Jessie Lewars's great granddaughter, Jessie Lewars Dove, inherited the handbill and it came back into the public sphere in Cambridge, around 1940. It was included as a reproduction in the 1940 Burns Chronicle.

Burns also wrote to James Johnson in Edinburgh and requested a copy of The Scots Musical Museum for Jessie, saying "My wife has a very particular friend, a young lady who sings well, to whom she wishes to present the Scots Musical Museum, If you have a spare copy, will you be so obliging as to send it by the very first fly, as I am anxious to have it soon." Johnson sent three, her copy being inscribed by the poet with a heartfelt expression of his appreciation for her kindness to him:

Thine be the volumes, Jessie fair,
And with them take the Poet's prayer:
That Fate may in her fairest page.
With ev'ry kindliest, best presage
Of future bliss, enrol thy name:
With native worth and spotless fame.
And wakeful caution, still aware
Of ill – but chief man's felon snare;
All blameless joys on earth we find,
And all the treasures of the mind —
These be thy guardian and reward;
So prays thy faithful friend, the Bard.

Burns dedicated "O, Wert Thou in the Cauld Blast" to Jessie Lewars, set to the tune "Lennox Love to Blantyre", first printed in Currie, 1800, but written in the spring or summer of 1795.

O wert thou in the cauld blast,
On yonder lea, on yonder lea,
My plaidie to the angry airt,
I'd shelter thee, I'd shelter thee;
Or did Misfortune's bitter storms
Around thee blaw, around thee blaw,
Thy bield should be my bosom,
To share it a', to share it a'.

A thin quarto volume by Dr. Wolcott was given by Burns to Jessie, entitled Pindarinia, by Peter Pindar, 1794, inscribed "Un petit gage de Vamitie. R. Burns." ('a small token from a friend')

After Burns's death it was John Lewars who wrote on behalf of Jean Armour Burns to several of Robert's close and intimate friends, such as James Burness in Montrose. Jessie's friendship with Jean Armour Burns continued and she remained a support to the family, caring for the four small brothers.

Years after his death she related to Robert Chambers regarding Burns that "When he chanced to come home and find no dinner ready, he was never in the least irritated, but would address himself with the greatest cheerfulness to any makeshift set before him. They generally had abundance of good Dunlop cheese, sent them by their Ayrshire friends. The poet would sit down to bread and cheese, with his book by his side and seem to the casual visitor as happy as a courtier at the feast of Kings."

== Micro-history ==
Jessie had her portrait painted by John Irvine. At a festival held in honour of the poet's sons in 1844, Jessie was given pride of place next to Robert Burns's relatives.
