= Jean Lorimer =

Friend of Robert Burns (1775–1831)

- Born: 1775; Craigieburn, Moffat parish
- Died: 1831; Newington, Edinburgh
- Occupations: Governess and housekeeper

Jean Lorimer (1775–1831) was a friend of the poet Robert Burns, often referred to by him as the "Lassie wi' the lint-white locks" or "Chloris". Lorimer was born at Craigieburn House on a small estate near Moffat and from 1788 to 1791 was a neighbour of Burns when he was living at Ellisland Farm, her father's new farm being at Kemmishall or Kemys Hall, Kirkmahoe Parish, two miles to the south of Ellisland on the opposite bank of the Nith. Burns commented "The Lady on whom it was made, is one of the finest women in Scotland" in a letter to George Thomson, enclosing one of the two dozen or so songs that he wrote for her. They first met when she was a teenager through his excise duties bringing him to their farm.

== Life and character ==
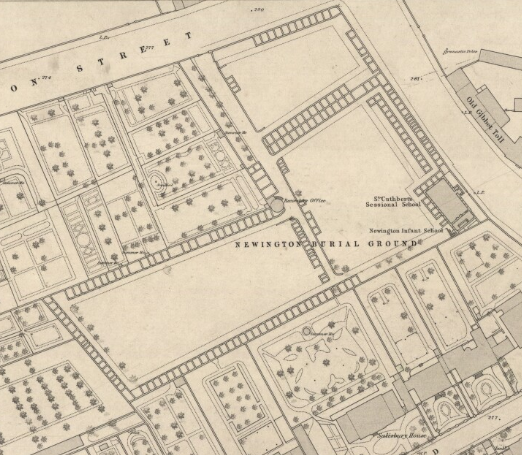
The East Preston Street Burial Ground.

Her father, William Lorimer, was a tea and wine merchant and a farmer, at first at Craigieburn House near Moffat. Agnes Carson of Morton was her mother, who William had married in 1772. In the autumn of 1790 her parents continued to farm at Craigieburn, but also took a lease of Kemmishall Farm from Robert Riddell of Friars Carse. Jean became a good friend of Jean Armour and Burns was a frequent visitor to their home.

Jean had a sister and three brothers. Their mother was "given to drinking" which caused difficulties for the family. Lorimer was a very attractive, blue eyed and fair haired, an unusual hair colour in the area at the time, with a fine singing voice, catching the attention of several men, such as John Lewars, James Thomson, and in particular another colleague of Burns in the excise, John Gillespie.

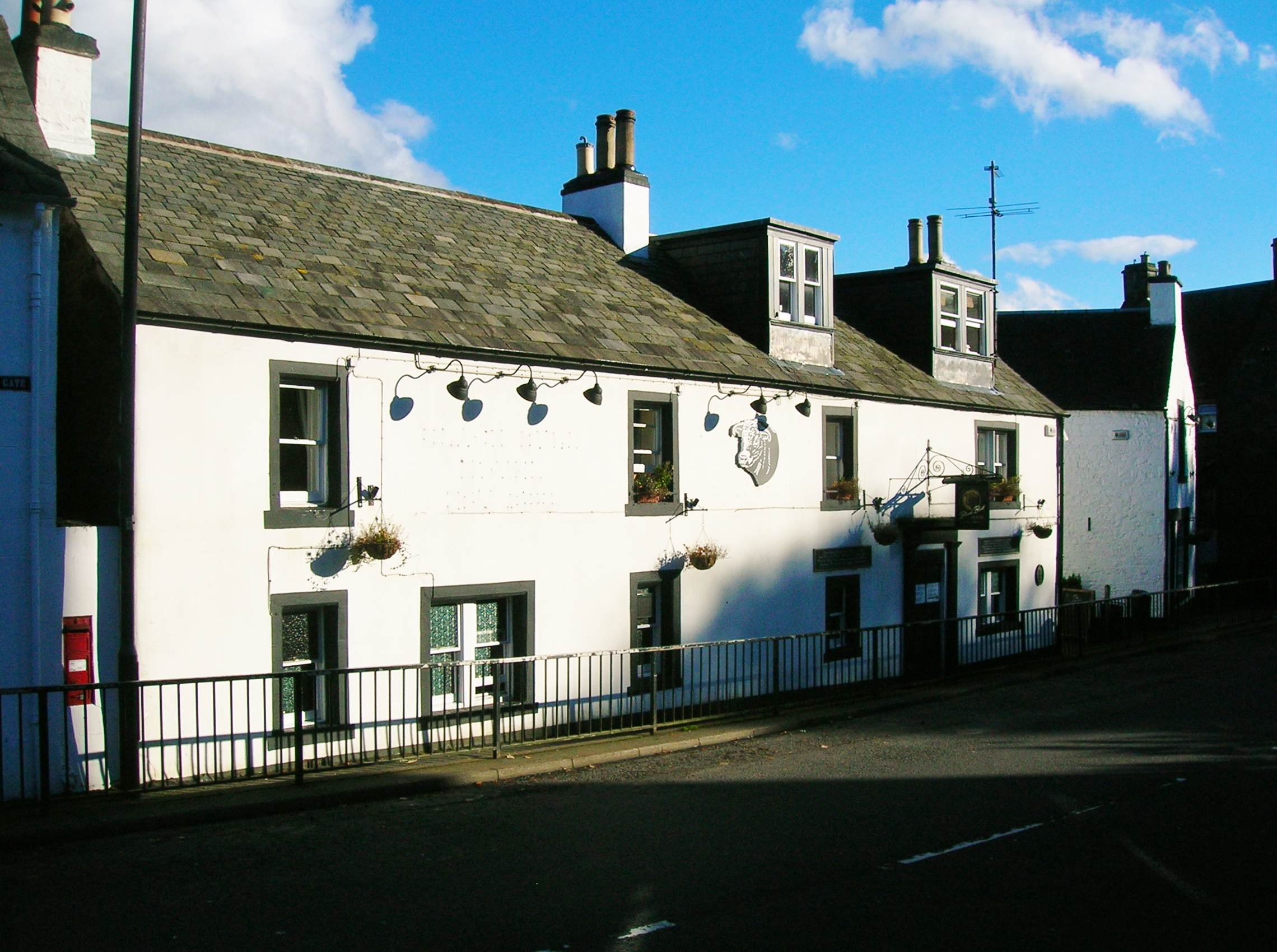
The Black Bull Inn, Moffat

Robert wrote several songs on Jean for John when she was only around 16, however in 1793 when she was barely 18 she eloped to Gretna Green to marry the 19 year old Andrew Whelpdale, a native of Penrith in Cumberland who had a small farm near Moffat at Barnhill. Andrew abandoned her three weeks or so after the couple had returned to Barnhill Farm and he absconded back to Cumberland to avoid his creditors and she was therefore forced returned to her parents at Kemmishall where she reverted to her maiden name, however she was legally obliged to remained married to him. Whelpdale had met Jean at a ball in Moffat and having a small annuity from his mother he seemed a respectable individual.

Towards the end of her life, twenty-three years after she had last seen him, Jean visited her spendrift husband in the debtors' prison at Carlisle, generously seeing him every day for a month. She had, it is said, only married him in the first place when he threatened to commit suicide if she would not marry him.

In 1795 the family gave up Kemmishall or Kemys Hall due to his business failing and moved into Dumfries where William developed senile dementia and in 1808 he died in poverty. Burns remained friendly with the Lorimers as is shown by a letter of August 1795 "Jeany and you are all the people, besides my Edinburgh friends, whom I wish to see; and if you can come I shall take it very kind."

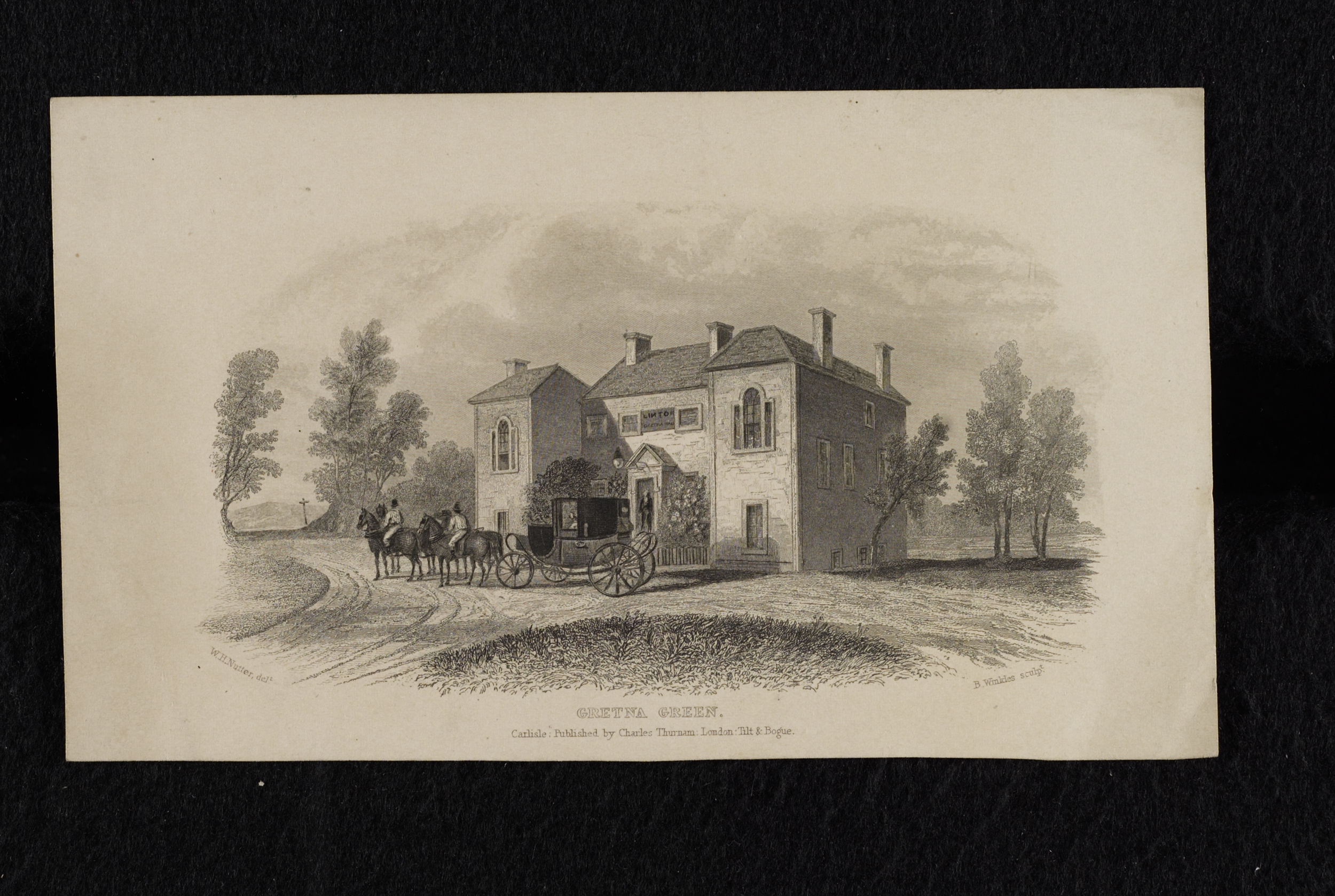
Gretna Green in the 18th century.

William Lorimer was once considered to be the "illicit dealer" that Burns had difficulties with on his excise duties, however this is now thought to be William Lorimer of Cairnmill, also in Nithsdale.

Jean is said to have moved to the north of England where she was employed as a governess by a succession of families before returning to Scotland in 1822, also as a governess. She lived under straitened circumstances, a little above begging and worse as implied by Thomas Thorburn who, whilst in Edinburgh encountered her in the street and declined her attentions, but gave her a shilling. James Hogg recorded that three associates of his, Mr Thomson, Mr Irvine and Mr Gibson, discovered Jean and became "greatly attached to her" as a result of their admiration for Robert Burns.

An unnamed gentleman approached the press with the intention of starting an appeal on her behalf. She later was employed as a housekeeper by a gentleman and his wife in Blacket Place, Newington, Edinburgh and then, when she became too infirm to work owing to a pulmonary infection, she was provided with a small flat in Middleton's Entry, Potterow where she lived for the remainder of her life.

Jean died aged 56 from 'Winter Cough', chronic bronchitis, in September 1831 and was buried in the Preston Street Burial Ground in Newington, Edinburgh. The cruciform gravestone carries the engraving:

"The "Chloris" and "Lassie wi' the lint white locks" of the poet Burns
Born 1773 Died 1831
Erected under the auspices of the Ninety Burns Club.
Edinburgh 1901"

Andrew Whelpdale, her absent husband, outlived her by three years. A watercolour and pencil painting of Jean Lorimer by an unknown artist is held in the collections of the National Galleries of Scotland.

== Association with Robert Burns ==
Burns composed around two dozen songs on 'Chloris', such as "O Wat Ye Wha's in Youn Town" however he later replaced 'Jean' with 'Lucy' and gave a copy to Lucy Johnston of Auchincruive near Ayr. George Thomson's publication has the version with 'Jean' however James Johnson's has 'Lucy' version.

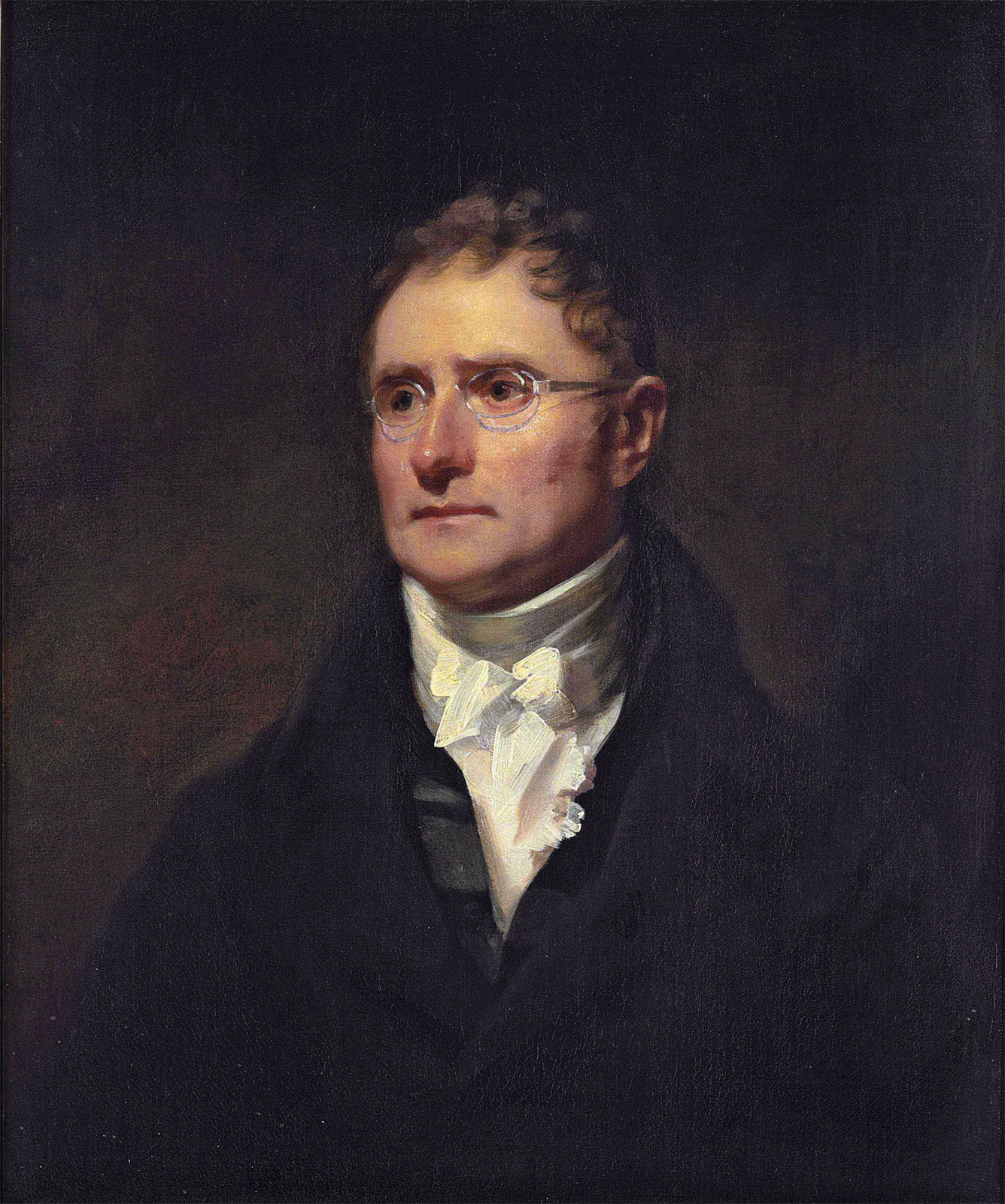
George Thomson, music publisher

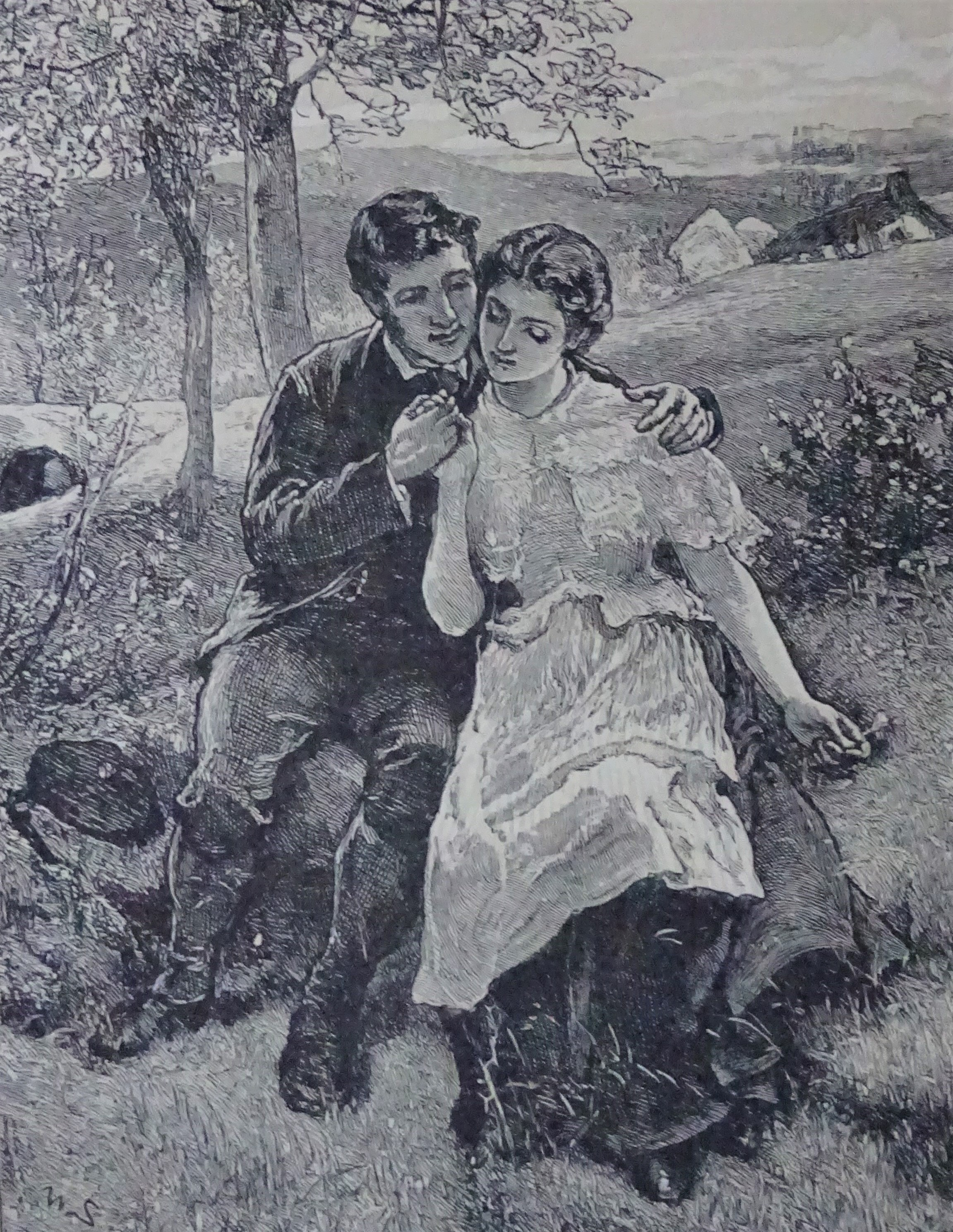
Robert Burns and Jean Armour

The Arcadian 'Chloris' of classical antiquity was the Greek 'Goddess of spring, flowers and new growth', dwelling in the Elysian Fields and her partner was 'Zephyrus', the Greek personification of the west wind. Flora was the Roman equivalent. Burns commented that "Chloris was the poetic name of the lovely goddess of my inspiration."

In 1791 Burns wrote several songs on behalf of his excise colleague John Gillespie, such as "Sweet Closes the Ev'ning on Craigieburn Wood" to the tune 'Craigieburnwood'. John however had been transferred to Portpatrick. In the enclosed letter Burns emphasised the latent feelings that Jean had for John, writing that "I wonder Mr Burns what pet Mr Gillespie has taken at this country, that he does not come and see his friends again?"

In August 1795 Burns wrote that "Mrs Burns so obliging as to promise me yesternight to beg the favor of Jeany to come and partake with her, and she was so obliging as to promise that she would." At this social occasion Robert Cleghorn was present, as were two farmers, Mr.Wight and Mr.Allan. Jean Armour on this occasion sang the Jean Lorimer inspired "O, that's the lassie o' my heart" to the tune of "Morag" and Robert Cleghorn later requested a copy.

Burns in his songs calls her 'Jean' or 'Chloris' from 1794 and sees her as a heroine of song, the words not being composed for him to woo her. He wrote to George Thomson saying "don't put any of your squinting construction on this, or have any clishmaclaver about it." In the same letter Burns gave some insight into his technique for writing an inspiring song "I put myself on a regimen of admiring a fine woman; & in proportion to the adorability of her charms, in proportion you are delighted with my verses." "The lightning of her eye is the godhead of Parnassus, & the witchery of her smile the divinity of Helicon"

Burns requested a copy of George Thomson's Select Scottish Airs, for 'Chloris' writing that "The Lady is not a little proud that she is to make so distinguished a figure in your collect'n, & I am not a little proud that I have it in my power to please her so much."

Writing to George Thomson in February 1796 Burns revealed that "In my bypast songs, I dislike one thing; the name, Chloris. I meant it as the fictitious name of a certain Lady; but on second thoughts, it is a high incongruity to have a Greek appellation to a Scotch Pastoral ballad."

James Hogg, the 'Ettrick Shepherd', the Scottish essayist, poet and novelist had visited Jean in around 1816 at Edinburgh and claimed that she had admitted to having had a physical relationship with Burns, although many biographers accept that the relationship was purely platonic. Burns is said to have stayed at Craigieburn whenever his excise duties took him to the Moffat area. The lack of genuine deep passion in the lyrics of his songs on Jean are seen as suggestive of a platonic friendship between them.

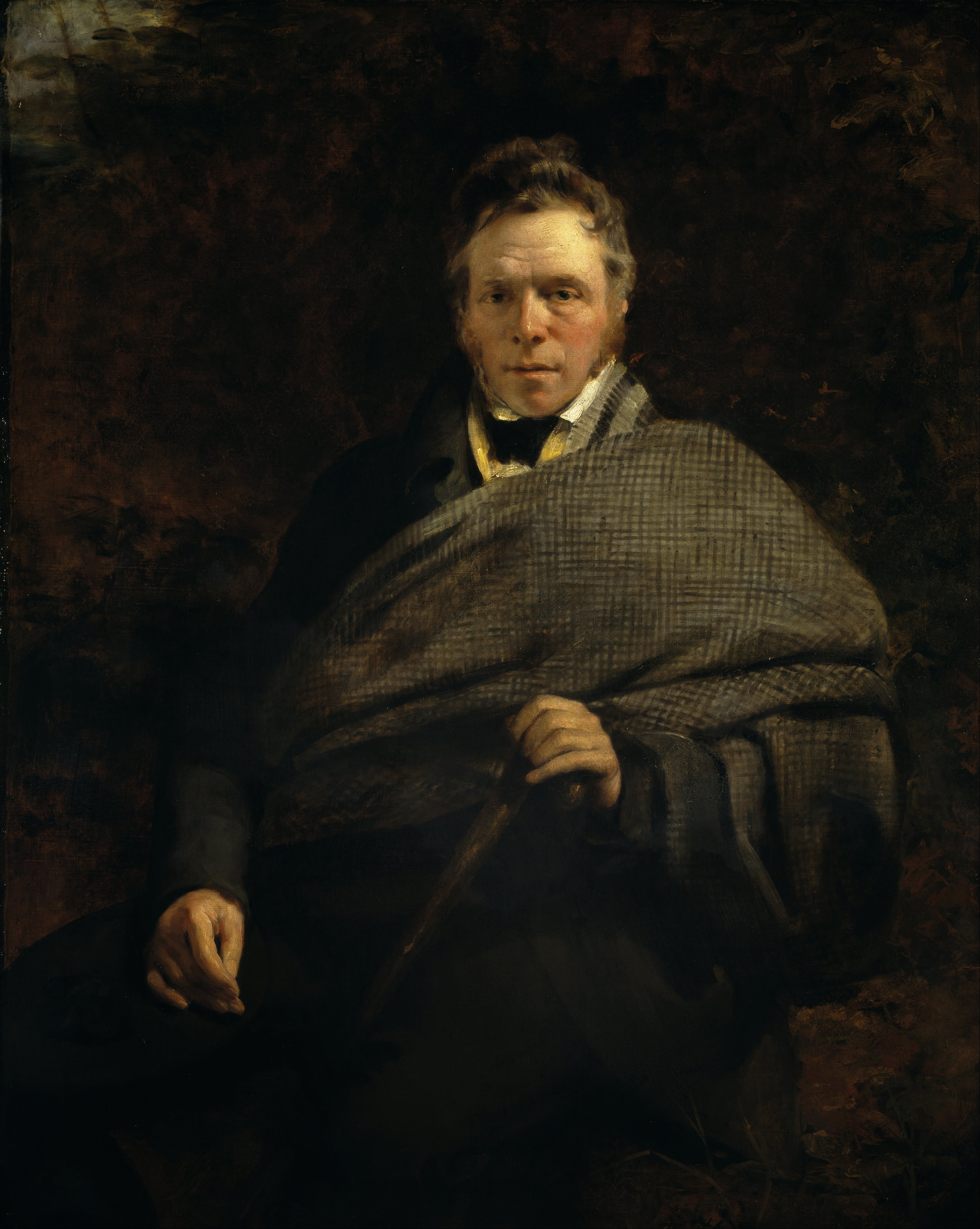
James Hogg 'The Ettrick Shepherd'.

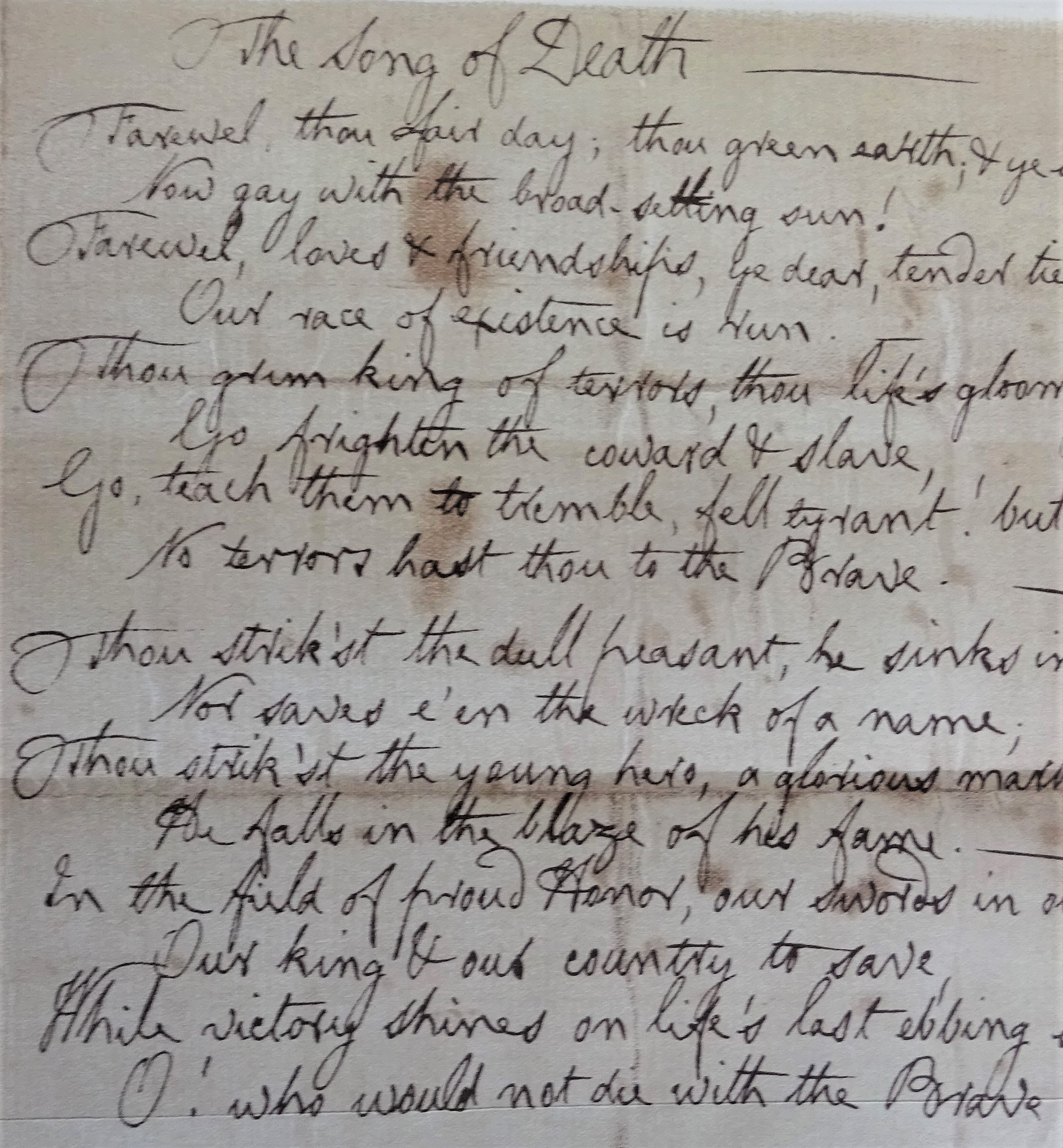
Burns's 'Song of Death'.

Burns engraved four lines of the song "She Says She Lo'es Me Best of a'" on a window pane at the Globe in Dumfries:

Her's are the willing chains of Love,
By conquering beauty's sovereign law;
But still my Chloris' dearest charm,
She says she loes me best of a'.

=== James Adam and Jean Lorimer ===
When just a schoolboy, Dr James Adam was sent by his father, also a doctor, to collect a package of Robert Burns's holograph letters, poems and songs from Lorimer. Jean was living in Edinburgh and, as stated, had fallen on hard times due to her husband abandoning her many years before and as a result she had difficulty paying her medical bills to Dr. Adam, however he was a Burns enthusiast and refused to accept payment but he agreed to take some of her collection of Burns's holograph letters, etc. as a gift.

Young James duly arrived at her home at 'Middleton's Entry' and, whilst eating the offering of a 'bap and jelly', Jean questioned him to make sure that the precious letters, etc. would be safe in his hands and would reach his father intact. It was the time of the resurrectionists or body snatchers and Jean warned him of the "dumbie doctors" who lurked in common stairs, closes and entries, shrouded in large, dark cloaks and provided with pitch plasters, which they suddenly clapped over the mouth and nose of an unwary, night-straggling urchin, while the "dumbie doctor" enveloped his prey in the fearful black mantle, and swiftly hurried it off to the ever-yawning doors of the "dissecting-room". This was the time of "Burke and Hare".

On departing Jean said "Now, dinna forget when you are a big man that you had the good wish of the Lassie wi' the Lint-white Locks. The documents safely made their way to James's father however they later became dispersed and in particular some that were lent to produce facsimiles could not be traced upon the death of the person they were loaned to. By this time the value of Burns' holographs was fully appreciated. One of these holographs was "The Song of Death".

In 1893 Dr James Adam published a book Burns' "Chloris": A Reminiscence, detailing his association with Jean and defending her character against several of Burns' biographers, such as Allan Cunningham.

=== Keepsakes of Burns ===
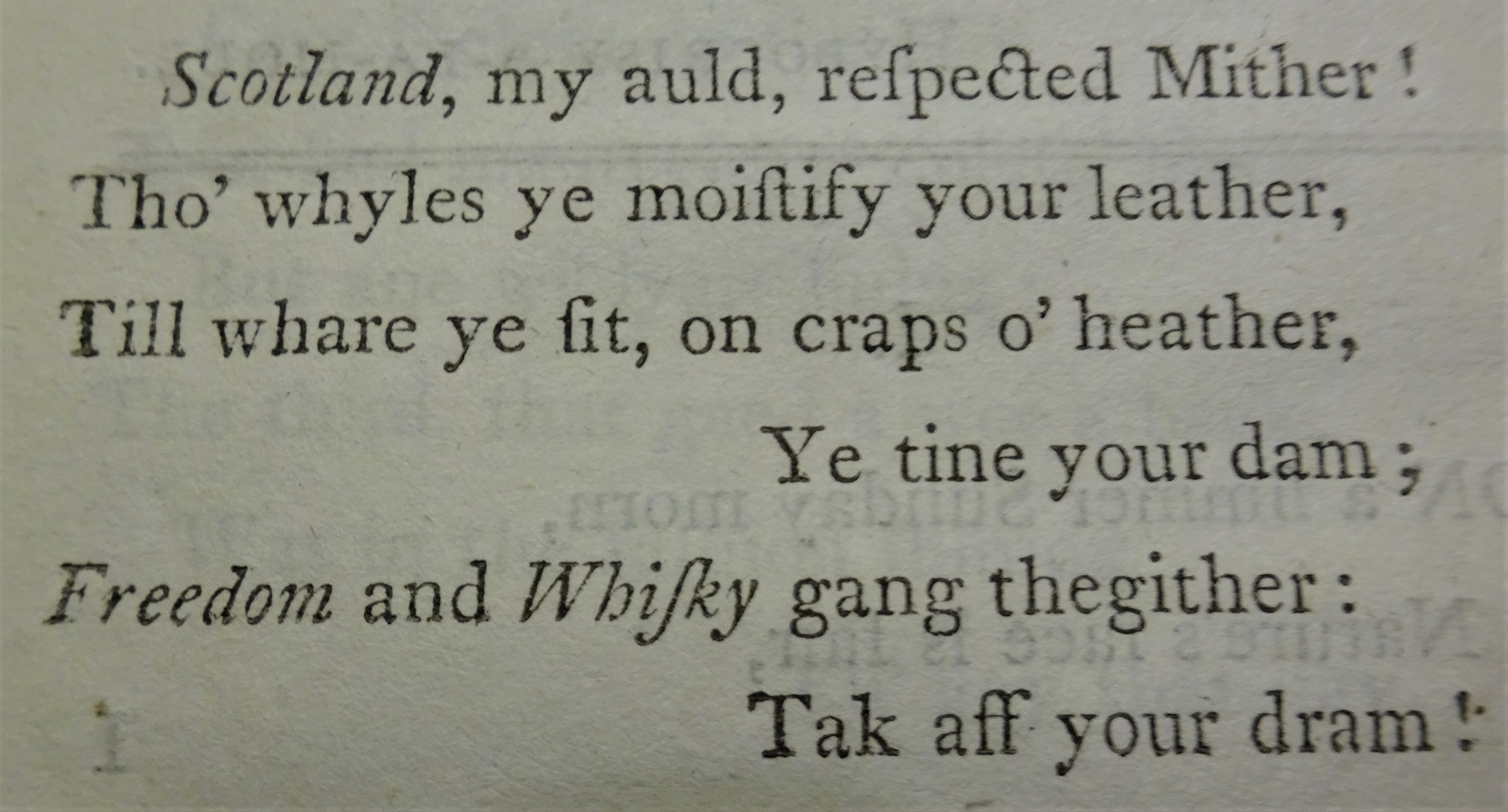
Earnest Cry and Prayer from the 1794 Edinburgh Edition

On 3 August 1795 Burns presented Lorimer with a copy of the last edition of his works published during his lifetime, the 1794 printing of Poems, Chiefly in the Scottish Dialect: "inscription, written on the blank leaf of a copy of the last edition of my poems, presented to the lady whom, in so many fictitious reveries of passion, but with the most ardent sentiments of real friendship, I have so often sung under the name of 'Chloris.'" The poem then followed: "Tis friendship's pledge, my young fair friend."

James Hogg in 1834 recorded that Jean had a lock of Burns' hair that she kept in a small box.

== Songs and their tunes that were dedicated to Jean Lorimer or associated with her ==
Burns wrote more songs on Jean than on any other heroine and the last, "Yon rosy brier", was written in January 1795. As previously stated at least one song was re-dedicated to another lady by Burns and both versions are found in print. Maria Riddell claimed to be the heroine in another and Clarinda or Agnes Maclehose, Burns' 'Clarinda' may have been privately intended in another. Jean had some direct input to the sings, for example she insisted on a change to lines in "Whistle and I'll come to ye, my lad" despite Thomson's protestations.

In 1794 her friendship with Burns was on hold due to the 'Rape of the Sabines' incident and she was therefore unlikely to figure as a heroine in his songs of that period. At least twenty-four songs were written on her by Burns, others are sometimes attributed on her.

=== The songs ===
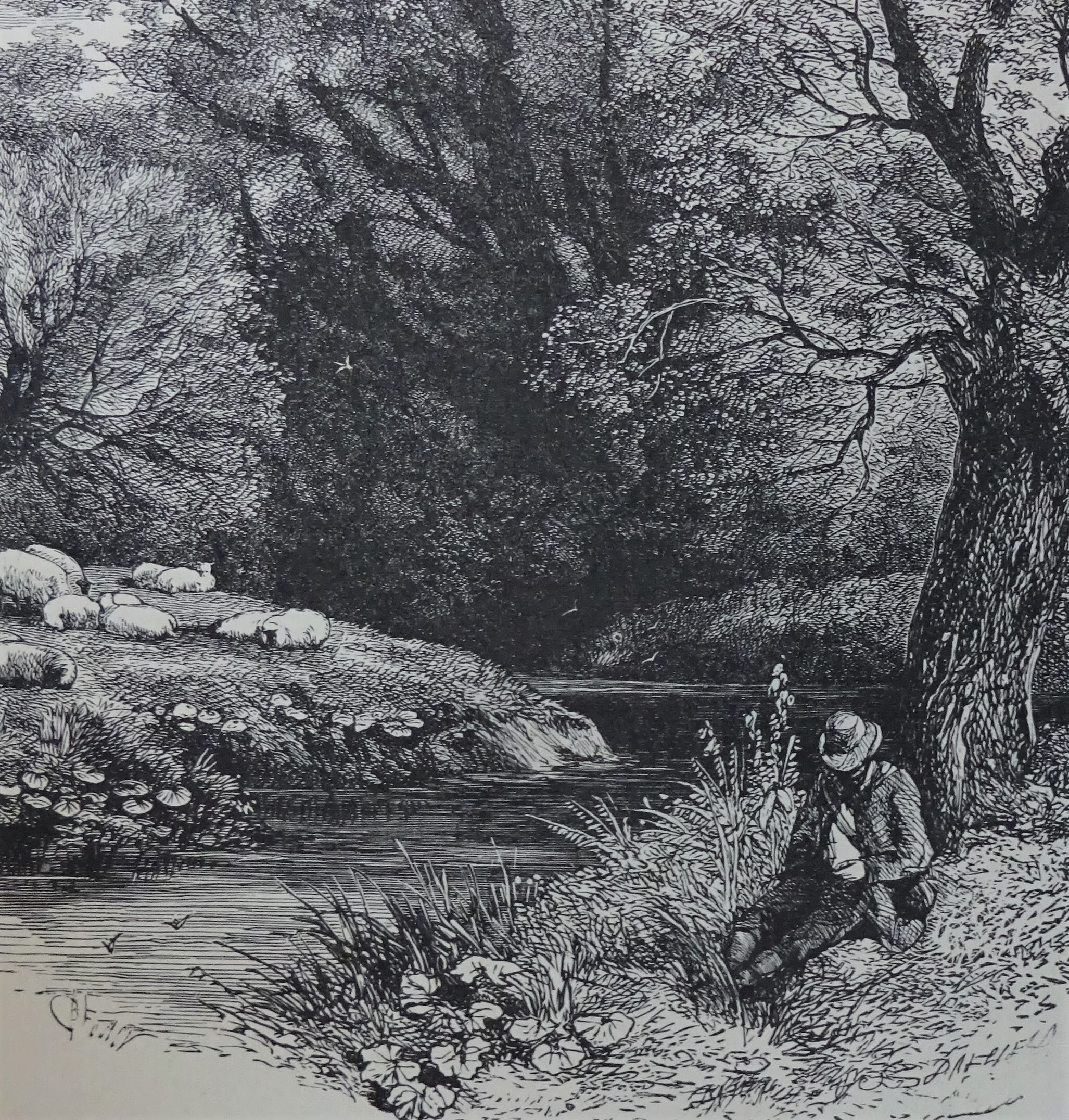
Craigieburn Wood by John Leighton FSA

- Craigieburn Wood - Craigieburnwood - 1791
- O Poortith cauld and restless love - Cauld Kail in Aberdeen - 1793
- Come, let me take thee to my breast - Cauld Kail - 1793
- Whistle and I'll come to ye, my lad - 1793
- She says she lo'es me best of a' - Oonagh's Waterfall - 1794
- On Chloris requesting me to give her a sprig of blossomed thorn (The Thorn) - 1795
- Ah, Chloris, since it may na be - Major Graham - 1793
- How long and dreary is the night - Cauld Kail - 1794
- Let not women e'er complain - Duncan Gray - 1794
- The Lover's morning salute to his mistress - Deil Tak the Wars - 1794
- Wilt thou be my dearie? - The Sutor's Dochter - 1793
- Fair Jenny - Saw ye My Father - 1793
- Behold, my love, how green the groves! - My Lodging is on the Cold Ground - 1794
- It was the charming month of May - Daintie Davie - 1794
- Lassie wi' the lint-white locks - Rothiemurchie's Rant - 1794
- Craigieburn Wood (Second version)- Craigieburnwood - 1794
- I'll ay ca' in by yon town - I'll gang nae mair to yon toun - 1795
- O wat ye wha's in yon town - I'll gang nae mair to yon toun - 1795
- Address to the Woodlark - Loch Erroch-side - 1795
- The author, on hearing a Thrush sing in a morning walk - 1793
- Mark yonder pomp of Costly Fashion - Deil tak the Wars - 1795
- On Chloris being ill - Ay wakin' O - 1795
- 'Twas na her bonie blue e'e - Laddie, lie Near Me - 1795
- Forlorn, my love, no comfort near - Let me in this ae night - 1795
- Thine am I, my faithful Fair - The Quaker's Wife - 1793
- Why, why tell thy lover - Caledonian Hunt's delight - 1795
- O' this is no my ain lassie - This is no my ain house - 1795
- Yon Rosy Brier - 1795
- O wha is she that lo'es me? - Morag - Uncertain
- To Chloris (Inscription) - 1795
- Their Groves o' Green Myrtle - Humours of Glen - 1795
