= Chronology of Shakespeare's plays =

Possible order of composition of Shakespeare's plays

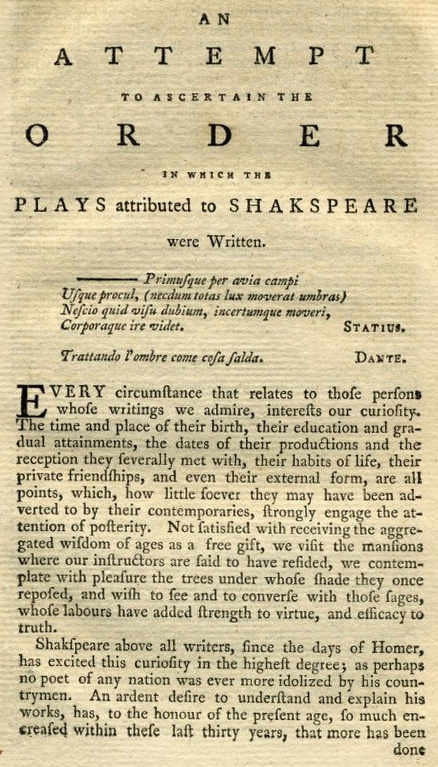
Edmond Malone was the first scholar to construct a tentative chronology of Shakespeare's plays in An Attempt to Ascertain the Order in Which the Plays attributed to Shakspeare were Written (1778), an essay published in the second edition of Samuel Johnson and George Steevens's The Plays of William Shakespeare.

This article presents a possible chronological listing of the composition of the plays of William Shakespeare.

Shakespearean scholars, beginning with Edmond Malone in 1778, have attempted to reconstruct the relative chronology of Shakespeare's oeuvre by various means, using external evidence (such as references to the plays by Shakespeare's contemporaries in both critical material and private documents, allusions in other plays, entries in the Stationers' Register, and records of performance and publication), and internal evidence (allusions within the plays to contemporary events, composition and publication dates of sources used by Shakespeare, stylistic analysis looking at the development of his style and diction over time, and the plays' context in the contemporary theatrical and literary milieu). Most modern chronologies are based on the work of E. K. Chambers in "The Problem of Chronology" (1930), published in Volume 1 of his book William Shakespeare: A Study of Facts and Problems.

== Introduction ==
Since the surviving evidence is fragmentary, there is not, nor can there be a definitive or precise chronology. Performance history is often of limited use, as the first recorded performances of many plays were not necessarily when the plays were first performed. For example, the first recorded performance of Romeo and Juliet was not until 1662, yet it is known the play was performed in Shakespeare's lifetime. At best, the performance history of a play establishes only the terminus ante quem of its composition.

Similarly, dates of first publication are often relatively useless in determining a chronology, as roughly half the plays were not published until seven years after Shakespeare's death, in the First Folio (1623), prepared by John Heminges and Henry Condell, and published by Edward Blount, William Jaggard and Isaac Jaggard. Performance dates and publication dates are also problematic insofar as many of the plays were performed several years before they were published. For example, Titus Andronicus was performed in 1592, but not published until 1594; Othello was performed in 1604, but not published until 1622; and King Lear was performed in 1606, but not published until 1608. Performance and publication dates can thus be used only to determine terminal dates of composition, with the initial dates often remaining much more speculative.

In addition, some scholars dissent from the conventional dating system altogether. A notable scholar who does so is E. A. J. Honigmann, who has attempted to push back the beginning of Shakespeare's career by four or five years, to the mid-1580s, with his "early start" theory. Honigmann argues that Shakespeare began his career with Titus Andronicus in 1586, though the conventional dating is that Shakespeare began writing plays after arriving in London in about 1590. Most scholars, however, adhere to a more orthodox chronology, and some, such as Gary Taylor and Sidney Thomas, argue that the early start theory causes more problems than it solves.

== Scholarship ==
=== E. K. Chambers ===
The chronology presented by E. K. Chambers in 1930 is as follows:

- Henry VI, Part 1 (1591–1592)
- Henry VI, Part 2 (1591–1592)
- Henry VI, Part 3 (1591–1592)
- Richard III (1592–1593)
- The Comedy of Errors (1592–1593)
- Titus Andronicus (1593–1594)
- The Taming of the Shrew (1593–1594)
- The Two Gentlemen of Verona (1594–1595)
- Love's Labour's Lost (1594–1595)
- Romeo and Juliet (1594–1595)
- Richard II (1595–1596)
- A Midsummer Night's Dream (1595–1596)
- King John (1596–1597)
- The Merchant of Venice (1596–1597)
- Henry IV, Part 1 (1597–1598)
- Henry IV, Part 2 (1597–1598)
- Much Ado About Nothing (1598–1599)
- Henry V (1598–1599)
- Julius Caesar (1599–1600)
- As You Like It (1599–1600)
- Twelfth Night (1599–1600)
- Hamlet (1600–1601)
- The Merry Wives of Windsor (1600–1601)
- Troilus and Cressida (1601–1602)
- All's Well That Ends Well (1602–1603)
- Measure for Measure (1604–1605)
- Othello (1604–1605)
- King Lear (1605–1606)
- Macbeth (1605–1606)
- Antony and Cleopatra (1606–1607)
- Coriolanus (1607–1608)
- Timon of Athens (1607–1608)
- Pericles, Prince of Tyre (1608–1609)
- Cymbeline (1609–1610)
- The Winter's Tale (1610–1611)
- The Tempest (1611–1612)
- Henry VIII (1612–1613)
- The Two Noble Kinsmen (1612–1613)

=== Modern Complete Works ===
There are six major modern scholarly editions of the Complete Works of Shakespeare:

- The Riverside Shakespeare (edited by G. Blakemore Evans in 1974, with a second edition in 1996)
- The Oxford Shakespeare: The Complete Works (edited by Stanley Wells, Gary Taylor, John Jowett and William Montgomery in 1986, with a second edition in 2005)
- The Norton Shakespeare: Based on the Oxford Edition (edited by Stephen Greenblatt, Walter Cohen, Jean E. Howard and Katharine Eisaman Maus in 1997, with a second edition in 2008 and a third in 2015)
- The Arden Shakespeare: Complete Works (edited by Richard Proudfoot, Ann Thompson and David Scott Kastan in 1998, with a second edition in 2002 and a third in 2011)
- The Complete Pelican Shakespeare (edited by Stephen Orgel and A. R. Braunmuller in 2002)
- The RSC Shakespeare: Complete Works (edited by Jonathan Bate and Eric Rasmussen in 2007).

Additionally, as with Oxford, Arden, Pelican and the RSC, the New Cambridge Shakespeare, the New Penguin Shakespeare, the Signet Classic Shakespeare, the Dover Wilson Shakespeare, the Shakespeare Folios and the Folger Shakespeare Library all publish scholarly editions of individual plays, although none has issued a complete works.

The Arden Shakespeare presents the plays in alphabetical order of their titles, without any attempt to construct an overall chronology. The Oxford, Riverside, Norton and RSC collections each rely on chronologies that differ from one another and attempt only approximate dating. The following list is based on The Oxford Shakespeare: The Complete Works (2nd ed.) and the accompanying William Shakespeare: A Textual Companion (Revised ed.), edited by Stanley Wells and Gary Taylor.

== Chronology ==
=== The Two Gentlemen of Verona (1587–1591) ===
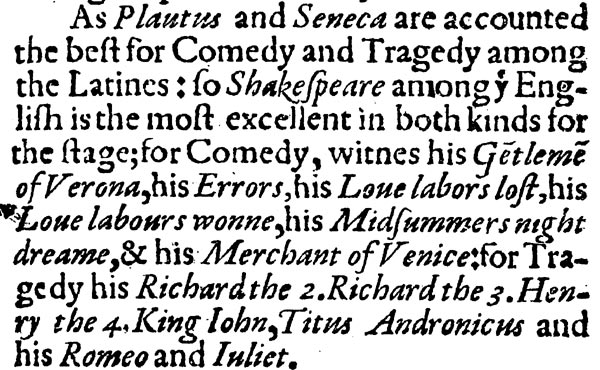
Extract from Francis Meres' Palladis Tamia (1598), which makes reference to twelve of Shakespeare's plays.

First official record: in Francis Meres's Palladis Tamia (1598), referred to as "Gentlemen of Verona."
First published: First Folio (1623).
First recorded performance: an adaptation by Benjamin Victor was performed at Drury Lane in 1762. The earliest known performance of the straight Shakespearean text was at Covent Garden on 15 April 1784, although because of the reference to the play in Palladis Tamia, we know it was definitely performed in Shakespeare's lifetime.
Evidence: Stanley Wells argues that the play's "dramatic structure is comparatively unambitious, and while some of its scenes are expertly constructed, those involving more than, at the most, four characters betray an uncertainty of technique suggestive of inexperience." The play is therefore considered one of the first Shakespeare composed after his arrival in London c.1590, at which point he would have lacked theatrical experience. Furthermore, the discussion between Launce and Speed regarding the vices and virtues of Launce's mistress (3.1.276–359) seems to borrow from John Lyly's Midas, which was written in late 1588 and/or early 1589, thus fixing a terminus post quem for the play. This situates the date of composition as somewhere between 1589 and 1591, by which time it is known Shakespeare was working on the Henry VI plays. In his 2008 edition of the play for the Oxford Shakespeare, Roger Warren, following E. A. J. Honigmann, suggests Shakespeare may have written the play before he arrived in London, possibly as early as 1587, although he acknowledges this theory is purely speculative.

=== The Taming of the Shrew (1591–1592) ===
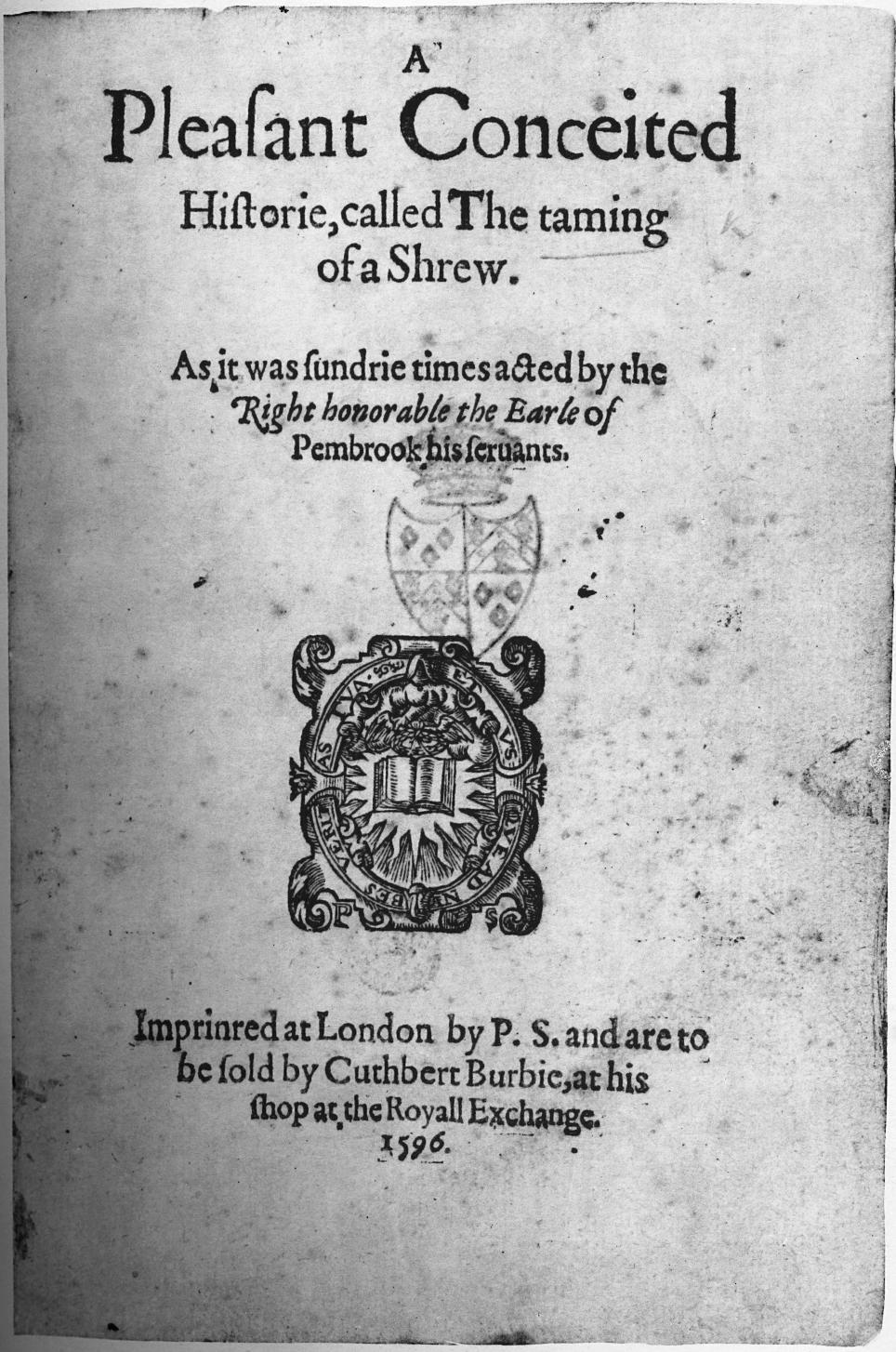
1596 second quarto of A Shrew

First official record: possible version of the play entered into Stationers' Register by Peter Short on 2 May 1594 as "a booke intituled A plesant Conceyted historie called the Tayminge of a Shrowe." The first record of the play as it exists today is found in the First Folio (1623).
First published: possible version of the play published in quarto in 1594 as A Pleasant Conceited Historie, called The taming of a Shrew (printed by Peter Short for Cuthbert Burby). This text was republished in 1596 (again by Short for Burby) and 1607 (by Valentine Simmes for Nicholas Ling). The play as it exists today was first published in the First Folio as The Taming of the Shrew.
Additional information (publication): there is a general lack of scholarly agreement regarding the exact relationship between the 1594 A Shrew and the 1623 The Shrew. Originally, A Shrew was seen as a non-Shakespearean source for The Shrew, meaning The Shrew must have been completed sometime after 2 May 1594. This remained the predominant theory until 1850, when Samuel Hickson suggested that A Shrew was in some way derived from The Shrew. Peter Alexander developed Hickson's work into his reported text/bad quarto theory, which necessitates that The Shrew must have been written prior to 2 May 1594. However, there are other theories about the relationship between the texts. In 1942, R. A. Houk posited the "Ur-Shrew" theory (in analogy with the "Ur-Hamlet" theory), suggesting that the plays are two completely unrelated texts by different authors based on the same (now lost) source. In 1943, G. I. Duthie refined this theory, suggesting that A Shrew was a reported text of an early draft of The Shrew. In his 1998 edition of A Shrew for the New Cambridge Shakespeare: The Early Quartos series, Stephen Roy Miller suggested A Shrew was an adaptation of The Shrew written by someone other than Shakespeare. Critics remain divided on this issue.
First recorded performance: according to Philip Henslowe's diary, a play called The Tamynge of A Shrowe was performed at Newington Butts on 11 June 1594. This could have been either the 1594 A Shrew or the Shakespearean The Shrew, but as the Admiral's Men and the Lord Chamberlain's Men, Shakespeare's own company, were sharing the theatre at the time, and, thus, Shakespeare himself was probably there, scholars tend to assume that it was The Shrew. The Shakespearean version was definitely performed at court before Charles I and Henrietta Maria on 26 November 1633, where it was described as "likt."
Evidence: a terminus ante quem for A Shrew would seem to be August 1592; a stage direction at 3.21 mentions "Simon," which probably refers to the actor Simon Jewell, who was buried on 21 August 1592. The Shrew must have been written earlier than 1593, as Anthony Chute's Beauty Dishonoured, written under the title of Shore's wife (published in June 1593) contains the line "He calls his Kate, and she must come and kiss him." This must refer to The Shrew, as there is no corresponding "kissing scene" in A Shrew. There are also verbal similarities between both Shrew plays and the anonymous play A Knack to Know a Knave (first performed in June 1592). Knack features several passages common to both A Shrew and The Shrew, but it also borrows several passages unique to The Shrew. This suggests The Shrew was on stage before June 1592. However, Kier Elam further narrows the terminal date of The Shrew to 1591, based on Shakespeare's probable use of two sources published that year: Abraham Ortelius's map of Italy in the fourth edition of Theatrum Orbis Terrarum and John Florio's Second Fruits. As neither Shrew play is likely to have been written any earlier than 1590, this places the likely date of composition of The Shrew as 1590–1591, with A Shrew written sometime prior to August 1592.

=== Henry VI, Part 1 (1591–1592) ===
First official record: possibly in Philip Henslowe's diary. On 3 March 1592, Henslowe reports seeing a "ne" play called "Harey the vj" (i.e. Henry VI), which could be a reference to 1 Henry VI, although this is not universally accepted. An entry found in the Stationers' Register on 19 April 1602 transferring the rights from Thomas Millington to Thomas Pavier of "The first and Second parte of Henry VJ" is thought to refer to what we today call 2 Henry VI and 3 Henry VI, not 1 Henry VI. The first definite record of the play was not until the First Folio in 1623.
First published: First Folio (1623), as The first Part of Henry the Sixt.
First recorded performance: possibly on 3 March 1592 at The Rose, as seen by Philip Henslowe. The earliest definite performance was on 13 March 1738 at Covent Garden.
Additional information (attribution): many critics consider 1 Henry VI to have been written as a prequel to the successful two-part play, The Contention and True Tragedy. Possibly co-written with Thomas Nashe and/or other unidentified dramatists.
Evidence: on 3 March 1592, Philip Henslowe saw a new play called "Harey the vj" at The Rose, but he gives no further information. In August, Thomas Nashe published Pierce Penniless, His Supplication to the Divell, in which he refers to a play he had recently seen featuring a rousing depiction of Lord Talbot, a major character in 1 Henry VI. Most critics take Nashe's reference to Talbot as supportive of the fact that the play Henslowe saw was 1 Henry VI. If, then, it was a new play in March 1592, and if we also assume that it was a prequel written after the other two plays in the trilogy, the play was most likely written in 1591 or very early 1592.

=== Henry VI, Part 2 (1591-1592) ===
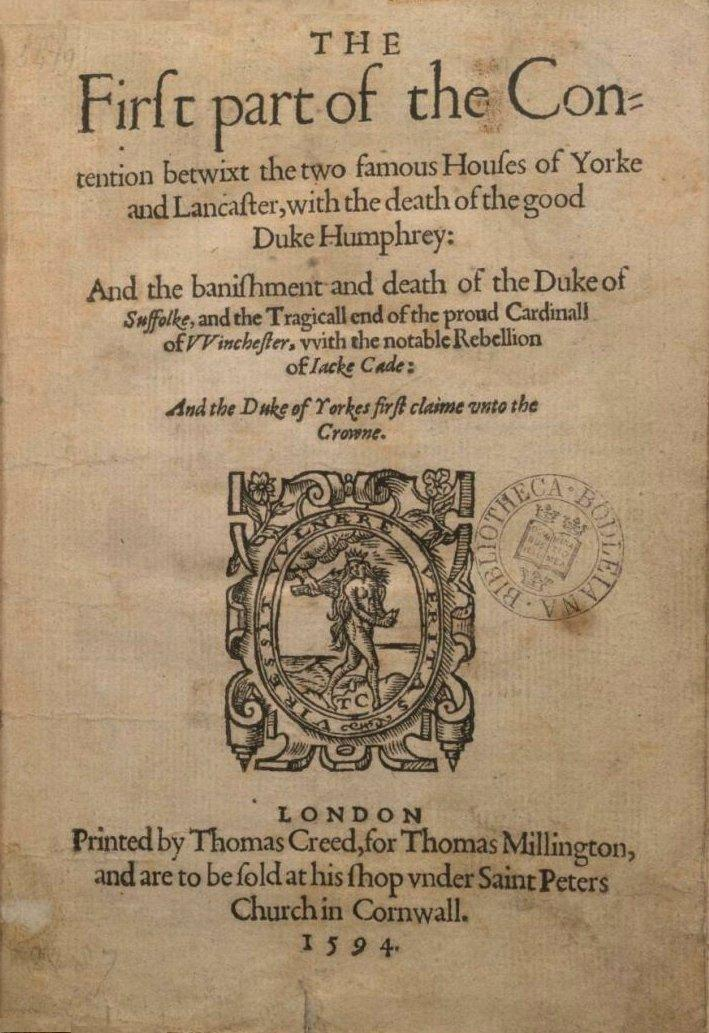
1594 quarto of The First part of the Contention

First official record: version of the play entered into the Stationers' Register by Thomas Millington on 12 March 1594 as "a booke intituled, the firste parte of the Contention of the twoo famous houses of York and Lancaster with the deathe of the good Duke Humfrey and the banishement and Deathe of the Duke of Suffolk and the tragicall ende of the prowd Cardinall of Winchester, with the notable rebellion of Jack Cade and the Duke of Yorkes ffirste clayme unto the Crowne."
First published: version of the play published in quarto in 1594 as The First part of the Contention betwixt the two famous Houses of Yorke and Lancaster, with the death of the good Duke Humphrey: And the banishment and death of the Duke of Suffolke, and the Tragicall end of the proud Cardinal of Winchester, with the notable Rebellion of Jack Cade: and the Duke of Yorke's first claim unto the Crowne (printed by Thomas Creede for Thomas Millington). This text was republished in 1600 (by Valentine Simmes for Millington) and in 1619. The 1619 text was printed with the 1595 octavo of Henry VI, Part 3 under the title The Whole Contention betweene the two Famous Houses, Lancaster and Yorke. With the Tragicall ends of the good Duke Humfrey, Richard Duke of Yorke, and King Henrie the sixt, as part of William Jaggard's "False Folio" (printed by Thomas Pavier). The 1623 Folio text of 2 Henry VI appears under the title The second Part of Henry the Sixt, with the death of the Good Duke Humfrey.
Additional information (publication): scholars are undecided as to the exact nature of the relationship between the 1594 The Contention and the 1623 2 Henry VI. There are four main theories: The Contention is a bad quarto, a reported text constructed from memory based upon a performance of 2 Henry VI; The Contention is an early draft of 2 Henry VI; The Contention is both a bad quarto and an early draft (i.e. a reported text based upon a staging of an early draft of the play); The Contention is an anonymous source for 2 Henry VI. Originally, the bad quarto theory was generally accepted by scholars. First suggested by Samuel Johnson in the original edition of The Plays of William Shakespeare (1765), it remained the predominant theory until challenged by Edmond Malone in The Plays and Poems of William Shakespeare (1790), favouring the early draft theory. In 1929, Peter Alexander and Madeleine Doran re-established the dominance of the bad quarto theory. Scholars have continued to debate the issue since then, with no real consensus reached. The source theory, originated by Georg Gottfried Gervinus in 1849 has fallen out of favour in the twentieth and twentieth-first centuries.
First recorded performance: although it is known that the play was definitely performed in Shakespeare's day, adaptations dominated the stage throughout the seventeenth and eighteenth centuries. The earliest known such adaptation was in 1681, with John Crowne's two-part play, Henry the Sixth, The First Part and The Misery of Civil War. Two more adaptations followed in 1723. The first was Humfrey Duke of Gloucester by Ambrose Philips, the second was Theophilus Cibber's King Henry VI: A Tragedy, both of which adapted scenes from 2 Henry VI. Another adaptation followed in 1817, J. H. Merivale's Richard Duke of York; or the Contention of York and Lancaster, which used material from all three Henry VI plays, but removed everything not directly related to York. The earliest known production of the Shakespearean 2 Henry VI was on 23 April 1864 at the Surrey Theatre, directed by James Anderson.
Evidence: it is known that True Tragedy (i.e. 3 Henry VI) was on stage by June 1592. It is also known that True Tragedy was definitely a sequel to The Contention, meaning The Contention must also have been on stage by early 1592 at the latest. It is also thought that Henry VI, Part 1 was a new play in March 1592. If The Contention predates 1 Henry VI, the theatrical evidence would place the likely date of 2 Henry VI as 1591.

=== Henry VI, Part 3 (1591-1592) ===
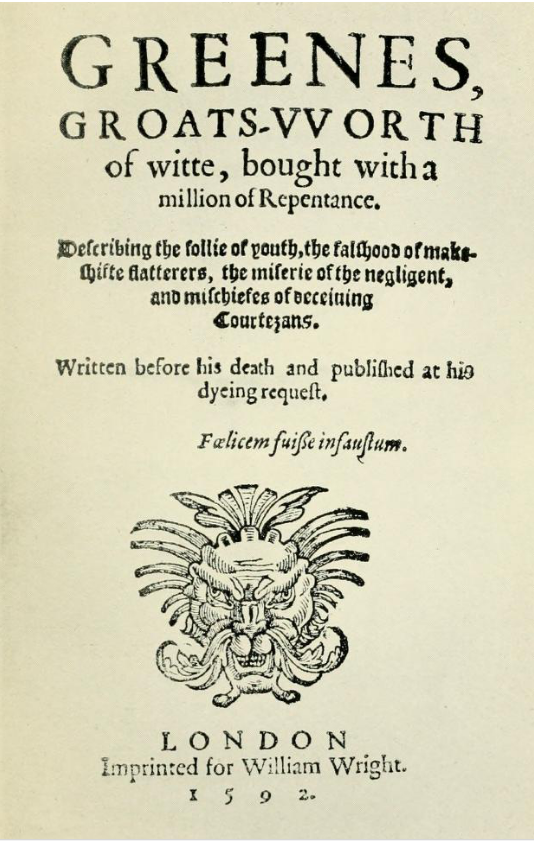
Title page of Robert Greene's Groatsworth of Wit, which helps fix a date for 3 Henry VI.

First official record: version of the play published in octavo in 1595. 3 Henry VI was never entered into the Stationers' Register.
First published: version of the play published in octavo in 1595 as The True Tragedie of Richard Duke of Yorke, and the death of good King Henrie the Sixt, with the Whole Contention betweene the two Houses Lancaster and Yorke (printed by Peter Short for Thomas Millington). This text was republished in quarto in 1600 (by William White for Millington) and in 1619. The 1619 text was printed with the 1594 quarto of 2 Henry VI under the title The Whole Contention betweene the two Famous Houses, Lancaster and Yorke. With the Tragicall ends of the good Duke Humfrey, Richard Duke of Yorke, and King Henrie the sixt, as part of William Jaggard's "False Folio" (printed by Thomas Pavier). The 1623 Folio text of 3 Henry VI appears under the title The third Part of Henry the Sixt, with the death of the Duke of Yorke.
Additional information (publication): scholars are undecided as to the exact nature of the relationship between the 1595 True Tragedy and the 1623 3 Henry VI. There are four main theories: True Tragedy is a "bad octavo", a reported text constructed from memory based upon a performance of 3 Henry VI; True Tragedy is an early draft of 3 Henry VI; True Tragedy is both a bad quarto and an early draft (i.e. a reported text based upon a staging of an early draft of the play); True Tragedy is an anonymous source for 3 Henry VI. Originally, the bad quarto theory was generally accepted by scholars. First suggested by Samuel Johnson in the original edition of The Plays of William Shakespeare (1765), it remained the predominant theory until challenged by Edmond Malone in The Plays and Poems of William Shakespeare (1790), favouring the early draft theory. In 1929, Peter Alexander and Madeleine Doran re-established the dominance of the bad quarto theory. Scholars have continued to debate the issue since then, with no real consensus reached. The source theory, originated by Georg Gottfried Gervinus in 1849 has fallen out of favour in the twentieth and twentieth-first centuries.
First recorded performance: although it is known that the play was definitely performed in Shakespeare's day, adaptations dominated the stage throughout the seventeenth and eighteenth centuries. The earliest known such adaptation was in 1681, with John Crowne's two-part play, Henry the Sixth, The First Part and The Misery of Civil War. In 1699, 3 Henry VI was also partly incorporated into Colley Cibber's The Tragical History of King Richard the Third. In 1723, Theophilus Cibber's King Henry VI: A Tragedy also adapted scenes from 3 Henry VI. Another adaptation followed in 1817, J. H. Merivale's Richard Duke of York; or the Contention of York and Lancaster, which used material from all three Henry VI plays, but removed everything not directly related to York. The earliest known production of the Shakespearean 3 Henry VI was on 4 May 1906 at the Shakespeare Memorial Theatre, directed by F. R. Benson.
Evidence: in Groatsworth of Wit, Robert Greene writes about "an upstart crow, beautified with our feathers, that with his 'tiger's heart wrapped in a player's hide', supposes that he is as well able to bombast out a blank verse as the best of you, and being an absolute Johannes fac totum, is in his own conceit the only Shake-scene in a country." Possibly directed at Shakespeare, this is a reference to a line in 3 Henry VI when York refers to Margaret as a "tiger's heart wrapped in woman's hide" (1.4.137). As Groatsworth was registered in the Stationers' Register on 20 September 1592, this means that True Tragedy must have been on stage prior to 23 June 1592, as that was when the government shut the London theatres due to an outbreak of plague. To have been on stage by June 1592, the play was most likely written sometime in 1591.

=== Titus Andronicus (1591–1592) ===
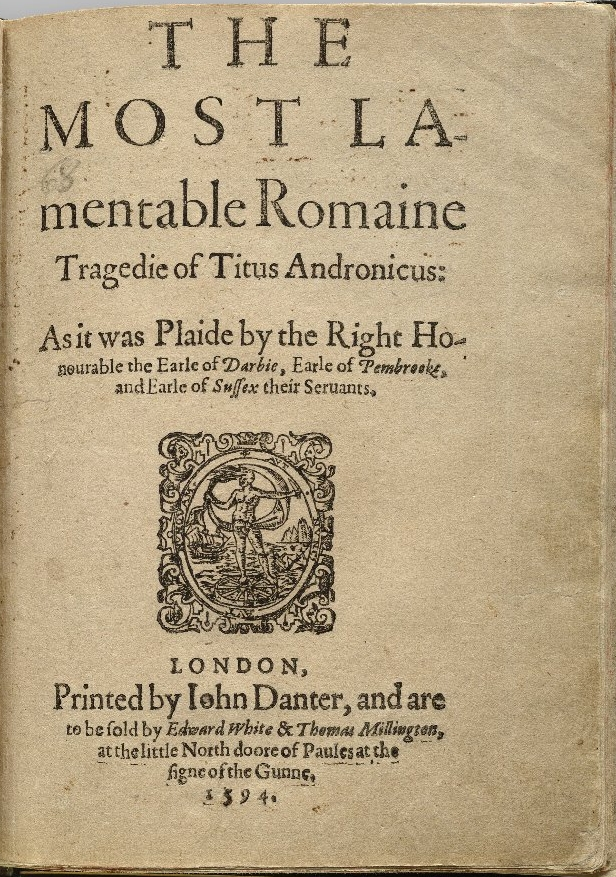
1594 quarto of Titus Andronicus

First official record: Philip Henslowe's diary, 24 January 1594, where he records seeing the play "titus & ondronicus" at The Rose.
First published: published in quarto in February 1594 as The Most Lamentable Romaine Tragedie of Titus Andronicus, the first known printing of a Shakespearean play (printed by John Danter for Edward White and Thomas Millington). The play was republished in 1600 (printed by James Roberts for White) and 1611 (printed by Edward Allde for White). The Folio text appears under the title The Lamentable Tragedy of Titus Andronicus.
First recorded performance: on 24 January 1594 performed by Sussex's Men at The Rose, as recorded in Henslowe's diary.
Additional information (attribution): Titus is most likely a collaboration between Shakespeare and at least one other dramatist, probably George Peele.
Evidence: E. A. J. Honigmann dates the play to 1586, arguing it to be Shakespeare's first piece, written several years prior to his arrival in London. In his 1994 edition of the play for the New Cambridge Shakespeare, Alan Hughes makes a similar argument, suggesting a date of 1588. Most scholars, however, tend to favour a post-1590 date, although there is by no means a consensus amongst them as to what that date may be. In his introduction to the 2001 edition of the play for the New Penguin Shakespeare (edited by Sonia Massai), Jacques Berthoud argues for a date of 1591; in his 1984 edition for the Oxford Shakespeare, Eugene M. Waith argues for a date of 1592; in his 1995 edition for the Arden Shakespeare, Jonathan Bate argues for a date of 1593. What is known is that the play is unlikely to have been written later than June 1592, as that was when the London theatres were closed due to an outbreak of plague. Additionally, stylistic analysis has shown that Titus belongs to Shakespeare's pre-plague group of plays. If it is assumed that the Henry VI trilogy was complete by March 1592 at the latest, it would suggest Titus was composed either immediately afterwards, or perhaps simultaneously as he was completing them, suggesting a date of late 1591/early 1592.

=== Richard III (1592–1593) ===
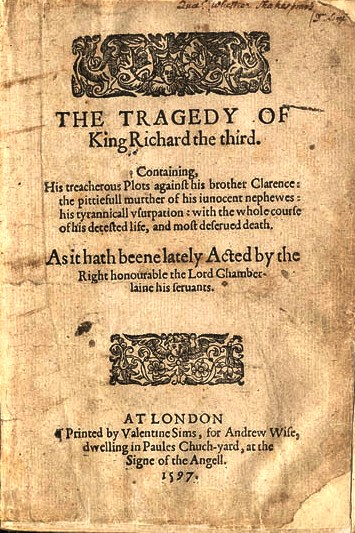
1597 quarto of Richard III

First official record: version of the play entered into the Stationers' Register by Andrew Wise on 20 October 1597 as "The tragedie of kinge Richard the Third w ^{th} the death of the duke of Clarence."
First published: version of the play published in quarto in December 1597 as The tragedy of King Richard the third. Containing, his treacherous plots against his brother Clarence: the pittiefull murther of his innocent nephewes: his tyrannicall usurpation: with the whole course of his detested life, and most deserved death (printed by Valentine Simmes for Andrew Wise). This text was republished in 1598 (by Thomas Creede for Wise), 1603 (again by Creede for Wise), 1605 (by Creede for Matthew Lawe), 1612 (again by Creede for Lawe) and 1622 (by Thomas Purfoot for Lawe). The Folio text appears under the title The Tragedy of Richard the Third, with the Landing of Earle Richmond, and the Battell at Bosworth Field.
Additional information (publication): because the 1597 quarto is of such good quality, without the obvious errors common to the 'original' bad quartos, as designated by Alfred W. Pollard (the 1597 Romeo and Juliet, the 1602 The Merry Wives of Windsor, the 1600 Henry V and the 1603 Hamlet), scholars are undecided as to the exact relationship between the quarto and the 1623 folio texts. If Q1 is a bad quarto, it is an uncommonly "good" bad quarto. It is thought that F1 was set from Q3 (the 1605 text), Q6 (the 1622 text) and the author's foul papers, and, as a result, Q1 and F1 differ from one another substantially. Most significantly, F1 contains roughly 230 lines not in Q1, Q1 contains roughly 40 lines not in F1, there are over 2000 textual differences, some scenes are arranged differently (including the order of the entry of the ghosts in 5.4), and Q1 has fewer characters than F1. There are two main theories: the quarto is a reported text, reconstructed from memory based on a performance of the play; the quarto is a performance text, a refined version of the longer folio text written by Shakespeare himself after the play had been staged. No real consensus has been reached on this issue.
First recorded performance: the play was performed extensively in Shakespeare's lifetime, and evidence would seem to suggest it was one of his most popular plays; it is mentioned in Palladis Tamia in 1598 (as "Richard the 3."), and by the time of the First Folio in 1623, had been published in quarto six times, and referenced by multiple writers of the day. Regarding specific performances, however, there is little solid evidence. In 1602, John Manningham mentions seeing Richard Burbage playing the role of Richard, probably at the Globe, where his performance so impressed a female member of the audience that she asked him to visit her later that night in the guise of Richard. The earliest definite performance was at St James's Palace on 16 or 17 November 1633 by the King's Men.
Evidence: it is known that Richard III was definitely a sequel to True Tragedy, which was on stage by 23 June 1592, hence Richard III must have been written roughly around the same period. A common argument regarding Shakespeare's chronology at this point in his career is that Richard III is a significantly better play than any of the Henry VI plays, with a much tighter structure, a more mature manner and a greater degree of stylistic control. This dramatic improvement in his writing is attributed to his absorbing the lessons of Senecan tragedy when composing Titus, which he was then able to incorporate into Richard. Additionally, in his 2000 edition of the play for the Oxford Shakespeare, John Jowett argues that the play may originally have been written for Lord Strange's Men, but Shakespeare added some new material after it had passed to Pembroke's Men, a company which formed in mid-1592 and disbanded in September 1593. The patron of Strange's Men was Ferdinando Stanley, 5th Earl of Derby, a direct descendant of Thomas Stanley, 1st Earl of Derby, a major character in the play. However, Shakespeare altered much of his source material (Sir Thomas More's History of King Richard III) regarding this character, presenting him as far more heroic and honourable than More. For example, Shakespeare has Thomas lead a battalion against Richard at the Battle of Bosworth Field, when it was, in fact, his brother William who led them. This suggests Shakespeare was writing with Ferdinando in mind, knowingly praising the ancestor of the company's patron. However, the play also takes the time to praise the ancestors of the patron of Pembroke's Men, Henry Herbert, 2nd Earl of Pembroke. Prior to the Battle of Bosworth, a list of names of lords who have joined Richmond's cause is read aloud, two of whom are "Sir Walter Herbert, a renown'd soldier" (4.5.9) and "redoubted Pembroke" (4.5.11). This passage is completely extraneous to the rest of the plot, is almost always cut in performance and has been argued to be an addition to the original composition. Pembroke is later mentioned by Richmond, who asks for him to be sent to his tent to consult on the eve of battle (5.4.5–8), a request never mentioned again. Additionally, in Q1, Richmond is flanked by "three lords" in 5.2, but in F1, the lords are all named, one of whom is the previously mentioned Walter Herbert. Both the request for Pembroke, which is subsequently forgotten, and the change of the anonymous lord to a specific historical individual suggest additions after the initial composition. Jowett argues that coupled with the narratively vital praise of Stanley's ancestor, the less integrated references to Herbert and Pembroke create something of a hypothetical internal chronology of composition in which Shakespeare initially writes the play for Strange's Men, but, perhaps due to the closing of the theatres in June 1592, the play passes to Pembroke's Men for a regional tour, at which point he adds the lines praising the ancestors of the new company in whose hands the play has now found itself.

=== Edward III (1592–1593) ===
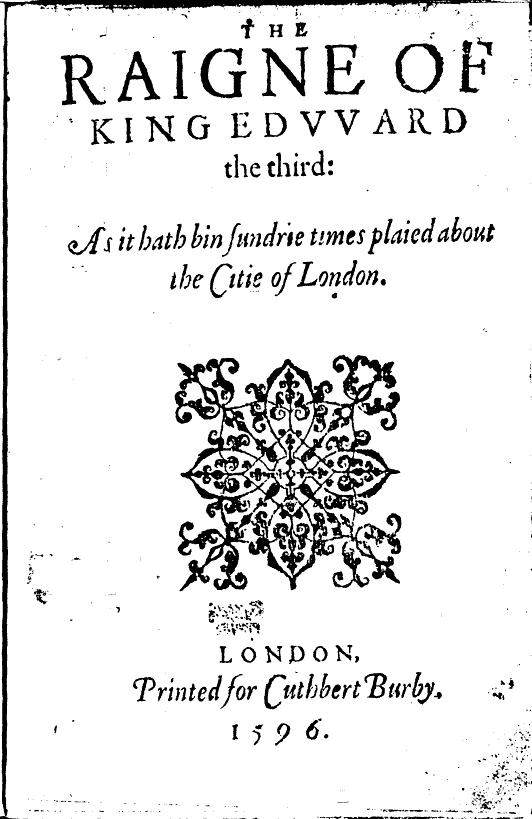
1596 quarto of Edward III

First official record: entered into the Stationers' Register by Cuthbert Burby on 1 December 1595 as "a booke intituled Edward the Third and the blacke prince their warres w^{th} kinge Iohn of Fraunce."
First published: published in quarto in 1596 as The Raigne of King Edvvard the third (printed anonymously for Burby). This text was republished in 1599 (printed by Simon Stafford for Burby).
First recorded performance: although it is known from the 1596 quarto title page that the play had been performed in London during the 1590s, the earliest recorded performance was not until 6 March 1911 at the Little Theatre, directed by Gertrude Kingston and William Poel. However, this production presented only the first half of the play (dealing with the Edward's infatuation with the Countess of Salisbury). Performed under the title, The King and the Countess, it was presented in a single matinée performance with the anonymous sixteenth century liturgical drama, Jacob and Esau. The first known performance of the complete text took place in June 1986 at the Globe Playhouse in Los Angeles, directed by Dick Dotterer, as part of the Shakespeare Society of America's presentation of the entire 'canon' of Shakespeare Apocrypha. The first known production of the play in the United Kingdom was in July 1987, at the Theatr Clwyd, directed by Toby Robertson.
Additional information (attribution): first attributed to Shakespeare by the booksellers Richard Rogers and William Ley in 1656, Shakespeare's possible authorship of the play was first investigated by Edward Capell in 1760. Although the question of authorship remains unresolved, many scholars do now agree that Shakespeare was involved in some way with writing the play and that it deserves a place in the Shakespearean canon. The play was included in the 2nd edition of the Riverside Shakespeare in 1996. In 1998, Giorgio Melchiori edited the first stand-alone scholarly edition of the play, for the New Cambridge Shakespeare. The play was also included in the 2nd edition of The Oxford Shakespeare: The Complete Works in 2005, edited by William Montgomery, and in the 2nd edition of the Norton Shakespeare in 2008. The Arden Shakespeare published an edition of the play in 2017, edited by Richard Proudfoot and Nicola Bennett.
Evidence: Edward III has been assigned many different possible dates of composition by a number of scholars. For example, Karl P. Wentersdorf favours a date of 1589–1590. MacDonald P. Jackson argues for 1590–1591. Roger Prior argues for a date of 1594. Obviously, the play was written by December 1595. A terminus post quem of 1590 can be fixed by Shakespeare's use of several post-1590 accounts of the defeat of the Spanish Armada in 1588. According to the title page of the 1596 quarto, the play had been performed recently in London, but no company information is provided. However, both MacDonald P. Jackson and Richard Proudfoot have argued that Edward III must have been part of the repertory of Pembroke's Men. This would explain the absence of an acting company on the title page; the company that performed the play had disbanded during the closure of the theatres from June 1592 to March 1594 (Pembroke's Men disbanded in September 1593). Giorgio Melchiori believes the connection to Pembroke's Men can help date the play. All of the Shakespearean plays performed by Pembroke's Men are pre-plague; Taming of the Shrew, The Contention, True Tragedy, Titus and Richard III. These plays all feature relatively large casts, with an emphasis on platforms, at least two doors and an upper stage. Edward III, however, needs only ten adult actors and one boy (the most cast-intensive scene is 5.1). Battle scenes are also muted, especially when compared to True Tragedy or Richard III, and the siege scene (4.2) requires no doors or upper stage. The conclusion reached by Melchiori regarding this evidence is that the writer(s) of the play were unsure where it was going to be staged, and therefore wrote it in such a way that it could be adequately staged by a small company performing on a basic stage. This would suggest it was written during the closure of the theatres, which places the date of composition sometime between mid-1592 and late 1593.

=== The Comedy of Errors (1594) ===
First official record: Francis Meres's Palladis Tamia (1598), referred to as "Errors."
First published: First Folio (1623).
First recorded performance: probably on Innocents Day, 28 December 1594, at Gray's Inn (one of the four London Inns of Court). The only known evidence for this performance is the Gesta Grayorum, a 1688 text printed for William Canning based on a manuscript apparently handed down from the 1590s, detailing the "Prince of Purpoole" festival from December 1594 to February 1595. According to the text, after a disastrous attempt to stage "some notable performance […] it was thought good not to offer any thing of Account, saving Dancing and Revelling with Gentlewomen; and after such Sports, a Comedy of Errors (like to Plautus his Menaechmus) was played by the Players. So that Night was begun, and continued to the end, in nothing but Confusion and Errors; whereupon, it was ever afterwards called, The Night of Errors." As Comedy of Errors is indeed based on Menaechmus, this is almost universally accepted as a reference to a performance of the play, probably by Shakespeare's own company, the newly formed Lord Chamberlain's Men. The earliest known definite performance was at court on 28 December 1604.
Evidence: traditionally, Errors has been dated quite early, and has often been seen as Shakespeare's first comedy, perhaps his first play. However, stylistic and linguistic analysis (proportion of verse to prose, amount of rhyme, use of colloquialism-in-verse, and a rare word test) has placed it closer to the composition of Richard II and Romeo and Juliet, both of which were written in 1594 or 1595. More specifically, the limited setting (it is one of only two Shakespeare plays to observe the Classical unities) and the brevity of the play (Shakespeare's shortest at 1777 lines), along with the great abundance of legal terminology, suggests the play may have been written specifically for the Gray's Inn performance. This would place its composition in the latter half of 1594.

=== Love's Labour's Lost (1594–1597) ===
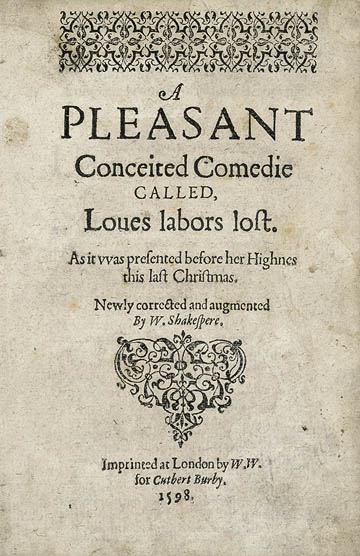
1598 quarto of Love's Labour's Lost

First official record: the play was published in quarto in 1598, although the exact date is unknown, as it was not entered into the Stationers' Register at the time. Also in 1598, Robert Tofte mentioned the play in his sonnet sequence Alba. The months minde of a melancholy lover; "Love's Labour Lost, I once did see, a play/Y'cleped so, so called to my pain." The date of publication of Alba is unknown as it also was not entered into the Register. Additionally, the play is mentioned in Meres's Palladis Tamia (registered on 7 September, with a dedication dated 10 October). It is unknown exactly which one of these three constitutes the first official record of the play.
First published: published in quarto in 1598 as A Pleasant Conceited Comedie called Loues labors lost, the first known printing of a Shakespearean play to include his name on the title page (printed by William Wright for Cuthbert Burby). However, due to the note "Newly corrected and augmented," it is known that a previous publication must have existed, which has apparently been lost.
First recorded performance: according to the quarto title page, the play was performed at court for Queen Elizabeth sometime over Christmas 1597, but no further information is provided. The earliest definite performance took place sometime between 8 and 15 January 1605, for Anne of Denmark, at the house of either Henry Wriothesley, 3rd Earl of Southampton, or Robert Cecil, 1st Earl of Salisbury.
Evidence: the play was likely written by Christmas 1597, but narrowing the date further has proved difficult, with most efforts focusing upon stylistic evidence. Traditionally, it was seen as one of Shakespeare's earliest plays. For example, Charles Gildon wrote in 1710; "since it is one of the worst of Shakespeare's Plays, nay I think I may say the very worst, I cannot but think that it is his first." For much of the eighteenth century, it tended to be dated to 1590, until Edmond Malone's newly constructed chronology in 1778, which dated it 1594. In his 1930 chronology, E. K. Chambers found the play to be slightly more sophisticated than Malone had allowed for, and dated it 1595. Today most scholars tend to concur with a date of 1594–1595, and the play is often grouped with the 'lyrical plays'; Richard II, Romeo and Juliet and A Midsummer Night's Dream, because of its prolific use of rhyming. These four plays are argued to represent a phase of Shakespeare's career when he was experimenting with rhyming iambic pentameter as an alternative form to standard blank verse; Richard II has more rhymed verse than any other history play (19.1%), Romeo and Juliet more than any other tragedy (16.6%) and Love's Labour's and Midsummer Night more than any other comedy (43.1% and 45.5% respectively). All four tend to be dated to the period 1594–1595. In support of this, Ants Oras's pause test places the play after Richard III, which is usually dated 1592. Furthermore, Gary Taylor finds possible allusions to the Gray's Inn revels of December 1594 (specifically the Muscovite masque in 5.2) and also finds plausible Geoffrey Bullough's argument that the satirical presentation of the King of Navarre (loosely based on Henry of Navarre, who was associated with oath-breaking after abjuring Protestantism in 1593) favours a date after December 1594, when Henry survived an assassination attempt by Jean Châtel. All of this suggests Shakespeare was writing the play in 1595, although revisions may have continued until the performance before the Queen in Christmas 1597.

=== Love's Labour's Won (1595–1598) ===
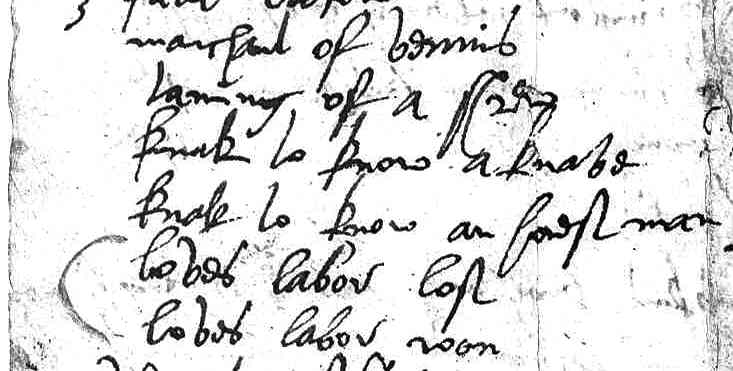
Christopher Hunt's list of plays; the bottom entry reads "Loves labor won."

First official record: Francis Meres's Palladis Tamia (1598), referred to as "Love labours wonne."
First published: prior to 1603; format and exact date unknown.
First recorded performance: there are no recorded performances of the play, but the fact that it is mentioned in Palladis Tamia strongly suggests it was performed.
Additional information (existence): there are only two known references to this play. One is in Meres's Palladis Tamia, the other is a fragment of Christopher Hunt's inventory, listing sixteen "ludes and tragedyes" sold from 9 to 17 August 1603. The list includes four Shakespearean plays; The Merchant of Venice, The Taming of a Shrew, Love's Labour's Lost, and Love's Labour's Won. Up until 1953, only Meres's reference was known, until Hunt's two pages of handwriting were discovered in the backing of a copy of Thomas Gataker's Certaine Sermones. The discovery was handed over to T. W. Baldwin, who published his findings in 1957 in Shakespeare's Love's Labour's Won. Baldwin argues that the title of the play suggests it was a sequel to Love's Labour's Lost, which is partially supported by the unusually open-ended nature of that play (the main characters all vow to meet again in a year's time). But whether the play ever existed has been debated, with some critics speculating that it is simply another name for one of Shakespeare's known plays, a situation similar to Henry VIII, which was originally performed with the title All is True. As Meres refers to The Two Gentlemen of Verona, The Comedy of Errors and The Merchant of Venice, prior to the discovery of the Hunt reference, a common suggestion was The Taming of the Shrew, but as Hunt mentions this play, it could not be Love's Labour's Won. Much Ado About Nothing, As You Like It, Troilus and Cressida and All's Well That Ends Well have also been cited as possibilities, with All's Well the most favoured. But these plays all tend to be dated later than 1598 (although the argument is that Love's Labour's Won is an early draft). As there are no other pre-1598 Shakespearean comedies with which to equate it, it seems certain that the play did exist, that it was performed and published, but that it has since been lost.
Evidence: the play's position in the chronology is based purely on the speculation that it was a sequel to Love's Labour's Lost.

=== Richard II (1595) ===
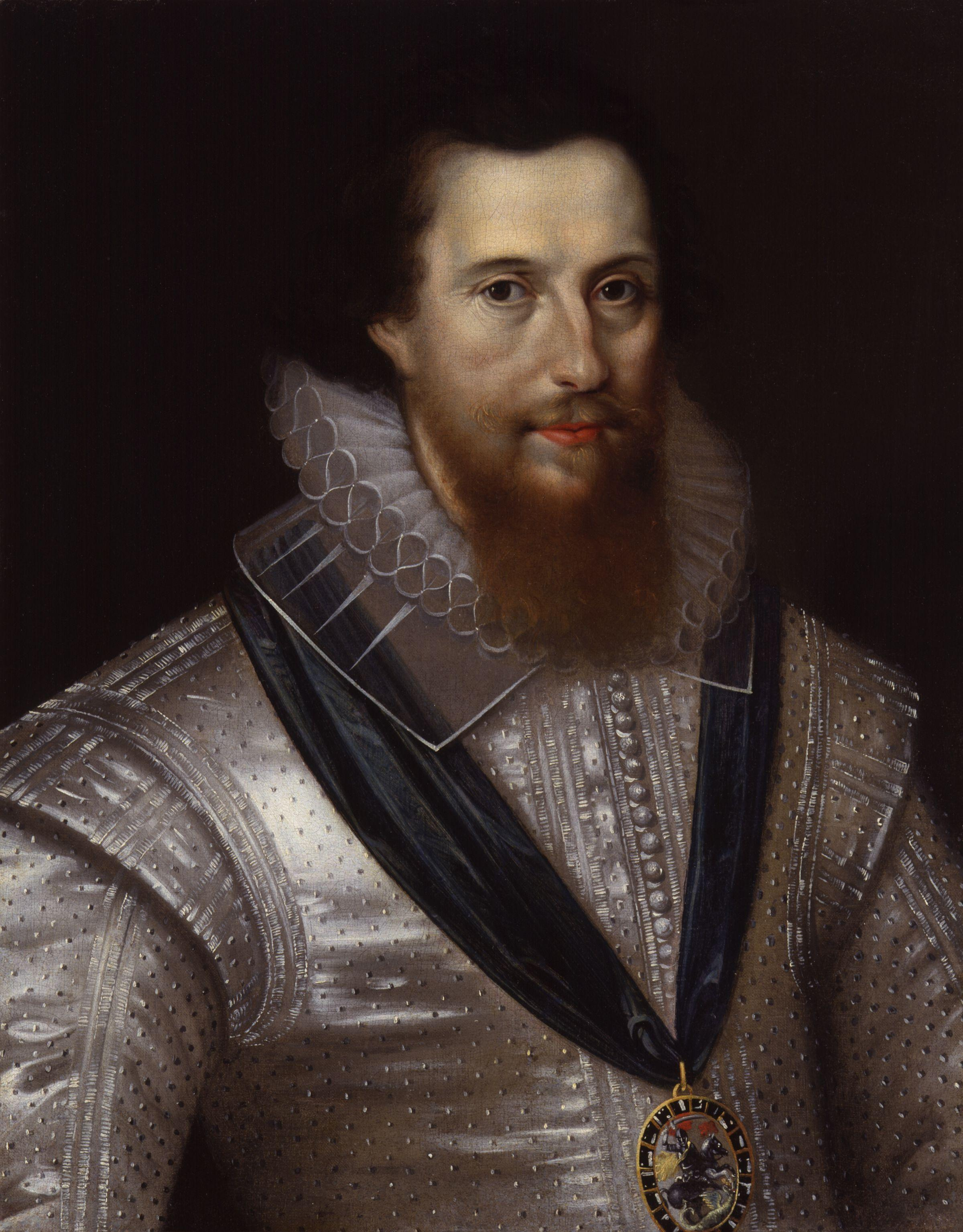
Robert Devereux, 2nd Earl of Essex, by Marcus Gheeraerts the Younger (1596). In 1601, Devereux staged the earliest definite production of Richard II.

First official record: entered into the Stationers' Register by Andrew Wise on 29 August 1597 as "the Tragedye of Richard the Second."
First published: published in quarto in 1597 as The Tragedie of King Richard the second (printed by Valentine Simmes for Andrew Wise). This text was republished twice in 1598 (on both occasions by Simmes for Wise), 1608 (by William Wright for Matthew Lawe) and 1615 (again by Wright for Lawe). The Folio text appears under the title The life and death of King Richard the Second.
First recorded performance: possible performance on 9 December 1595 at Sir Edward Hoby's house. On that date, Hoby's wife, Margaret Carey, daughter of Henry Carey, 1st Baron Hunsdon (chief patron of the Lord Chamberlain's Men), wrote a letter to Robert Cecil inviting him to supper and to see "K. Richard present him self to your vewe." This could be a reference to a private performance of Richard II, especially because of the Hunsdon connection with Shakespeare's company. However, some scholars argue that "K. Richard" could be a painting, not a play, whilst others argue there is no evidence that even if it is a play, it necessarily refers to Richard II, suggesting it could refer to Richard III or to another play entirely. There is no complete consensus on this issue, although most scholars do tend to favour the Richard II theory. The earliest definite performance was at the Globe on 7 February 1601, organised by Robert Devereux, 2nd Earl of Essex. This performance was probably intended to inspire his supporters on the eve of his armed rebellion against Queen Elizabeth.
Evidence: Richard II is usually seen as one of the 'lyrical plays', along with Love's Labour's Lost, Romeo and Juliet and A Midsummer Night's Dream; four plays in which Shakespeare used rhymed iambic pentameter more than anywhere else in his career. The four plays also include elaborate punning, rhetorical patterning, a general avoidance of colloquialisms and a high volume of metrical regularity. All four of these plays tend to be dated to 1594–1595. Also important in dating the play is Samuel Daniel's The First Four Books of the Civil Wars, which was entered into the Stationers' Register on 11 October 1594, and published in early 1595. Although some scholars have suggested that Daniel used Shakespeare as a source, which would mean the play was written somewhat earlier than 1594, most agree that Shakespeare used Daniel, especially in some of the later scenes, meaning the play could not have been written earlier than 1595. Recent analysis of an extant early manuscript of Daniel's poem, however, suggests that Shakespeare could have used such a manuscript as a source, making an earlier date possible.

=== Romeo and Juliet (1595) ===
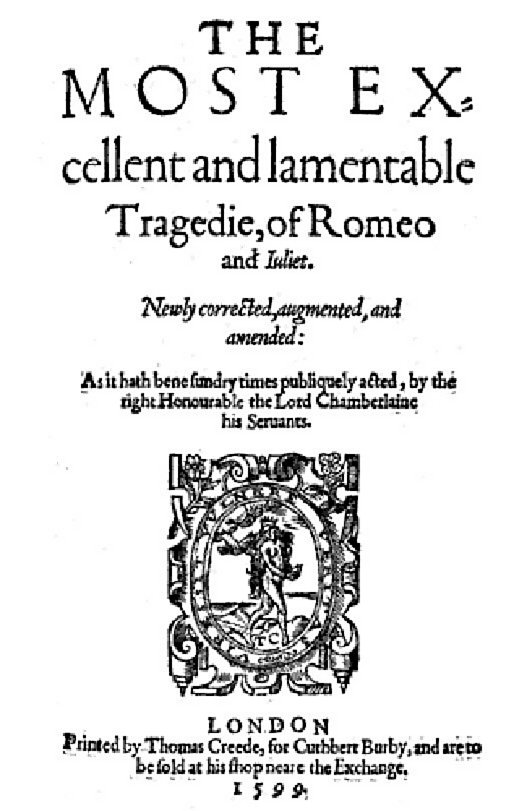
1599 second quarto of Romeo and Juliet

First official record: version of the play published in quarto in 1597. The play was not entered into the Stationers' Register at the time, not appearing until 22 July 1607.
First published: version of the play published in quarto in 1597 as An excellent conceited tragedie of Romeo and Iuliet (printed by John Danter for Cuthbert Burby). A revised version, "newly corrected, augmented and amended," was published in 1599 as The Most Excellent and Lamentable Tragedie of Romeo and Iuliet (printed by Thomas Creede for Burby). This text was republished in 1609 (by John Windet for John Smethwick) and 1622 (by William Stansby for Smethwick). The Folio text appears under the title The Tragedie of Romeo and Juliet.
Additional information (publication): the 1597 quarto text has traditionally been considered a bad quarto, and was one of the original texts in relation to which Alfred W. Pollard coined the term. However, in his 2007 edition of the quarto text for the New Cambridge Shakespeare: The Early Quartos series, Lukas Erne argues that although the text does exhibit many signs of memorial reconstruction, there is also evidence of authorial revision, and he believes the Q1 text is a closer representation of the play as it would have been performed at the time than either the longer Q2 or the 1623 Folio text (which was set from Q2).
First recorded performance: 1 March 1662 at Lincoln's Inn Fields, performed by the Duke's Company. Samuel Pepys wrote of the production (the first since the reopening of the theatres), "it is the play of itself the worst that ever I heard in my life, and the worst acted that ever I saw these people do."
Evidence: as there is virtually no external evidence (other than the quarto text which establishes 1597 as a terminus ante quem) with which to date the play, most arguments tend to centre on references within the play to topical events, publication dates of Shakespeare's influences, and stylistic evidence. A much-discussed possible topical allusion is the Nurse's reference to an earthquake which took place eleven years previously (1.3.24-36). The specificity of this reference has led many scholars to argue that Shakespeare must have been referring to a real earthquake. Originally, Thomas Tyrwhitt suggested the 1580 Dover Straits earthquake, which would place the composition of the play in 1591. Sidney Thomas, on the other hand, argues it may refer to a quake on 1 March 1584, mentioned in William Covell's Polimanteia, which was published in 1595 and with which Shakespeare was apparently familiar. This would suggest a date of composition of 1595. Influences on the play include Samuel Daniel's Complaint of Rosamund (1592) and John Eliot's Ortho-epia Gallica (1593), suggesting the play could not have been composed earlier than 1593. A colloquialism-in-verse test places it closest to Richard II, Ants Oras's pause test places it immediately after Love's Labour's Lost and immediately prior to A Midsummer Night's Dream, and a rare word test links it most closely to Love's Labour's Lost. Stylistically, the play is also firmly situated within the 'lyrical plays', which are all dated 1594–1595. This would correspond to the 1584 earthquake (assuming Shakespeare had in mind a particular quake at all), and suggest a main composition date of 1595. However, in her 2000 edition of the play for the Oxford Shakespeare, Jill L. Levenson argues that the play was most likely composed over several years, possibly covering a span as wide as 1593–1599.

=== A Midsummer Night's Dream (1595) ===
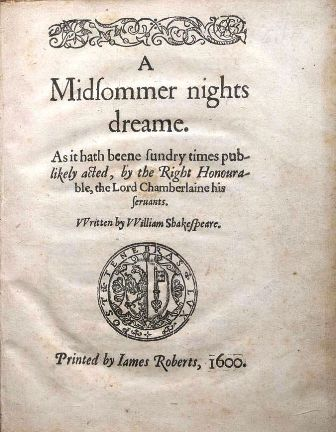
1619 "False Folio" title page of A Midsummer Night's Dream

First official record: Francis Meres's Palladis Tamia (1598); referred to as "Midsummers night dreame."
First published: published in November or December 1600 as A Midsommer nights dreame (printed by Richard Bradock for Thomas Fisher). This text was republished in 1619, with a title page date of 1600 and the name of the printer James Roberts. However, this reprint was part of William Jaggard's "False Folio" (printed by Thomas Pavier). The play had never been printed by Roberts.
First recorded performance: 1 January 1605 at court, when Dudley Carleton, 1st Viscount Dorchester, reported to John Chamberlain the acting of a masque "of Robin goode-fellow." The first definite performance took place on 29 September 1662 at Drury Lane, as reported by Samuel Pepys, who described it as "the most insipid ridiculous play that ever I saw in my life."
Evidence: stylistically, Midsummer Night is very much part of the 'lyrical plays', which would suggest a date of composition in 1594 or 1595. A strong argument that it was written immediately after Romeo and Juliet is the nature of Pyramus and Thisbe, which features a pair of ill-fated lovers who arrange to meet in secret and which ends with the heroine killing herself over the body of her dead love. In his 1979 edition of the play for the second series of the Arden Shakespeare, Harold F. Brooks argues that Shakespeare used the source story from Ovid's Metamorphoses first to examine the tragic potential and then to exploit its comic and farcical elements in his next play. A possible topical allusion is the line "the death/Of learning, late decreased in beggary" (5.1.52–53), which could refer to the spate of deaths of popular playwrights in the early 1590s; Robert Greene in 1592, Christopher Marlowe in 1593 and Thomas Kyd in 1594. That the play culminates with the marriage of Theseus and Hippolyta has led some to theorise it may have been written specifically for a wedding, with the most likely candidates being either the marriage of William Stanley, 6th Earl of Derby, and Elizabeth de Vere on 26 January 1595, or that of Sir Thomas Berkeley and Elizabeth Carey on 19 February 1596. That the second is the more likely of the two is due to the fact that Elizabeth's grandfather was Henry Carey, 1st Baron Hunsdon, and her father was George Carey, 2nd Baron Hunsdon, successive patrons of the Lord Chamberlain's Men. If the play was written for a wedding in February 1596, it was most likely composed in 1595. However, there is no solid evidence to suggest that the play was in fact written for a wedding, and most scholars are in agreement that stylistic evidence alone is sufficient to date the play to c.1595.

=== King John (1596) ===
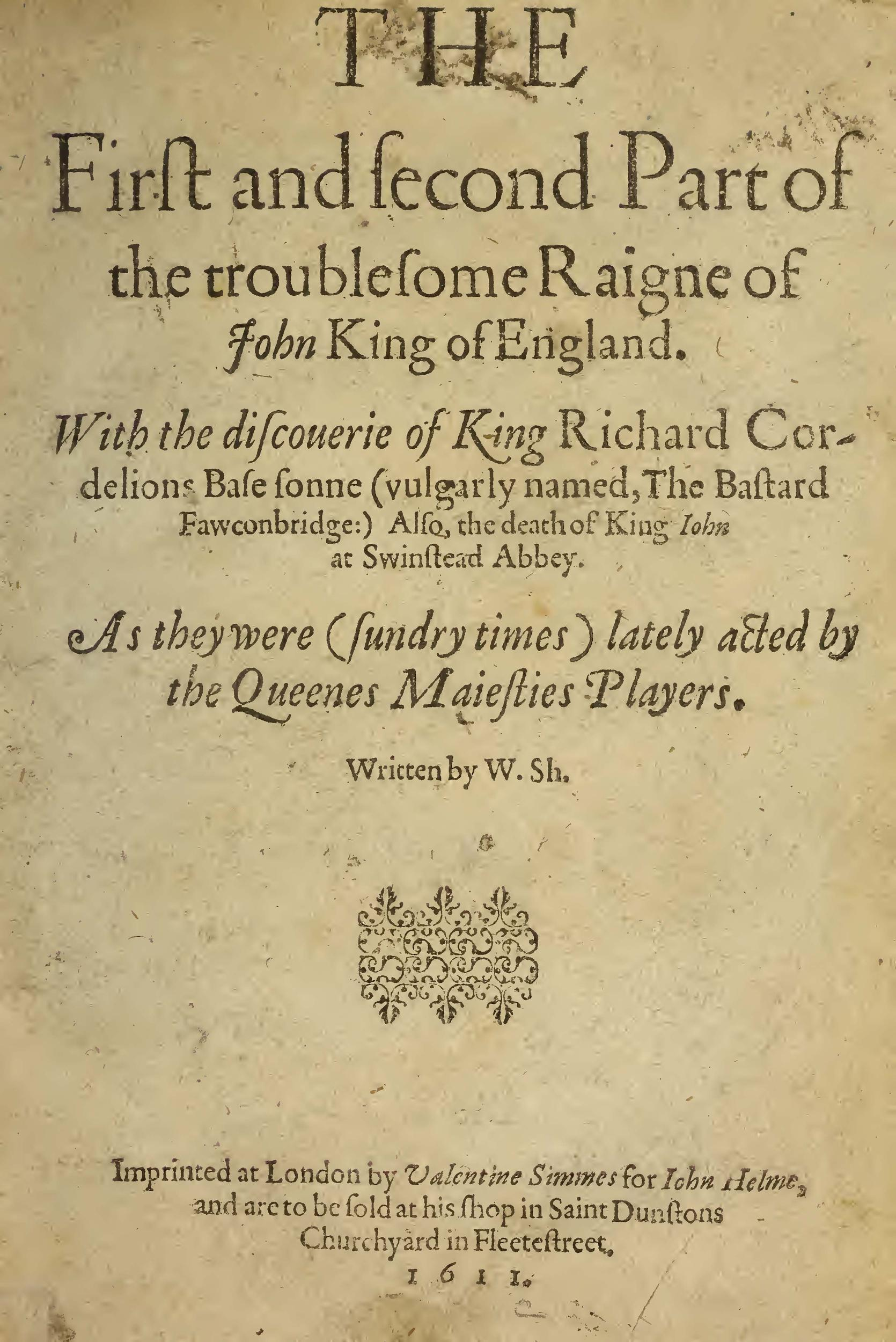
1611 quarto of The First and Second Part of the troublesome Raigne of King John of England, falsely attributed to "W.Sh."

First official record: Francis Meres's Palladis Tamia (1598), referred to as "King Iohn."
First published: First Folio (1623), as The life and death of King Iohn.
First recorded performance: although numerous references to the play throughout the seventeenth century indicate that it was performed with some frequency and success, there is no definite record of any specific performance. The first documented performance was on 26 February 1737, produced by John Rich at Drury Lane.
Evidence: King John can be a difficult play to date due to the lack of any real external evidence or internal topical allusions. Scholars have instead been forced to rely on stylistic evidence, and speculation regarding the play's relationship with the anonymous two-part play The Troublesome Reign of King John (c.1589), which was published in 1611 and 1622 under Shakespeare's name. King John was obviously in existence by 1598, as it is mentioned in Palladis Tamia, and most scholars agree that Shakespeare used Troublesome Reign as a source, meaning it must have been written after 1589. In his 1954 edition of the play for the second series of the Arden Shakespeare, however, E. A. J. Honigmann argues that Troublesome Reign is actually an adaptation of Shakespeare's King John based on the recollections of a performance, and hence King John was written prior to 1589. Although most scholars disagree with Honigmann on this point, the exact nature of the relationship between the two plays remains open to question. Stylistic evidence serves to locate the play in the mid-1590s. Both a rare word test and Ants Oras's pause test place it after Richard II. A colloquialism-in-verse test places it prior to the two Henry IV plays. All three of these plays were definitely written during the 1590s, suggesting King John must also have been written in that decade. Furthermore, Barron Brainerd's statistical analysis of Shakespeare's plays places King John just past the mid-way point of the decade, after Richard II and prior to Henry IV, Part 1.

=== The Merchant of Venice (1596–1597) ===
First official record: entered into the Stationers' Register by James Roberts on 22 July 1598 as "a booke of the Marchaunt of Venyce or otherwise called the Iewe of Venyce."
First published: published in quarto in 1600 as The Excellent History of the Merchant of Venice. With the extreame crueltie of Shylocke the Jewe towards the sayd merchant, in cutting a just pound of his flesh: and the obtayning of Portia by the choyse of three chests (printed by James Roberts for Thomas Heyes). This text was republished in 1619, with a title page date of 1600 and the name of the printer James Roberts. This reprint was part of William Jaggard's "False Folio" (printed by Thomas Pavier).
First recorded performance: although the title page of the 1600 quarto indicates the play was performed in the latter years of the sixteenth century, the earliest recorded performance was by the King's Men at Whitehall Palace for King James on 10 February 1605. James liked the play so much that he asked for it to be performed again two days later, on Shrove Tuesday.
Evidence: the play was obviously in existence by 1598. But other evidence places its date of composition as probably 1596 or very early 1597. An important topical allusion is Salarino's reference to "my wealthy Andrew docked in sand" (1.1.28). This is thought to refer to the San Andrés, a Spanish galleon that ran aground in Cádiz in June 1596 after a surprise attack under the command of Robert Devereux, Earl of Essex. The ship was subsequently captured, renamed the St. Andrew and incorporated into the Royal Navy. But she remained in the news throughout 1596. Upon arriving in England, she nearly ran aground on the Thames Estuary. In August, she served as a troopship during the Islands Voyage, and upon returning to a stormy England in October, Essex refused to allow her to sail past the Goodwin Sands, a location also referred to by Salarino (3.1.4–5). All of this suggests the play was written in the latter half of 1596 or very early 1597 when audiences would have been most perceptive to the Andrew reference. It has also been theorised that the play may have been written to capitalise on the enormous success of Christopher Marlowe's The Jew of Malta. Although Malta had been written in 1589 or 1590, it remained extremely popular throughout the 90s, and was revived on stage in 1596 when it was performed eight times by the Lord Admiral's Men.

=== Henry IV, Part 1 (1596–1597) ===
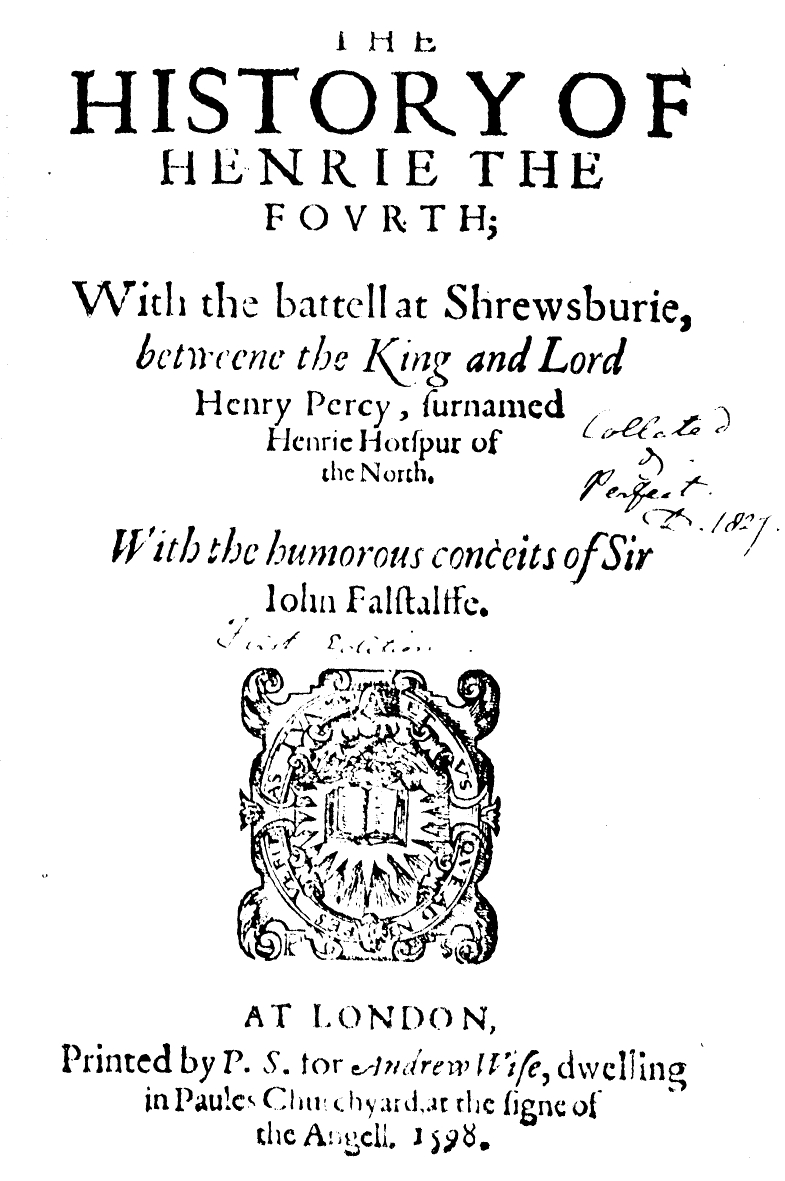
1598 quarto of Henry IV, Part 1

First official record: entered into the Stationers' Register by Andrew Wise on 25 February 1598 as "a booke intituled The historye of Henry the IIIJ^{th} with his battaile of Shrewsburye against Henry Hottspurre of the Northe with The conceited mirthe of Sir John Ffalstoff."
First published: two quarto texts were published in 1598. Only a fragment of one (designated Q0) has survived, running from 1.3.201-2.2.105. The other copy (Q1) was published under the title The History of Henrie the Fourth, with the battell at Shrewsburie between the King and Lord Henry Percy, surnamed Hotspur of the North, with the humorous conceits of Sir John Falstaffe (printed by Peter Short for Andrew Wise). This text was republished in 1599 (by Simon Stafford for Wise), 1604 (by Valentine Simmes for Matthew Lawe), 1608 (by John Windet for Lawe), 1613 (by William White for Lawe) and 1622 (by Thomas Purfoot for Lawe). The Folio text appears under the title The First Part of Henry the Fourth, with the Life and Death of Henry Sirnamed Hot-spurre.
First recorded performance: possibly on 6 March 1600 at the house of George Carey, 2nd Baron Hunsdon for the Flemish ambassador. In a letter dated 8 March from Rowland Whyte to Robert Sidney, 1st Earl of Leicester, Whyte mentions that Hunsdon employed the Lord Chamberlain's Men to perform a play called "Sir John Old Castlle." Originally, Falstaff was called Sir John Oldcastle, but Shakespeare was pressured into changing the name. Although "Sir John Old Castlle" could be a reference to Sir John Oldcastle by Anthony Munday, Michael Drayton, Richard Hathwaye and Robert Wilson, the fact that Hunsdon was using Shakespeare's own company, rather than the rival Lord Admiral's Men, suggests the play referred to was in fact 1 Henry IV. Another possible performance took place on or around 14 February 1613, when either 1 Henry IV or Henry IV, Part 2 (or both) were performed at court as part of the celebrations for the marriage of Princess Elizabeth to Frederick V, Elector Palatine. A play performed under the title The Hotspur is thought to refer to 1 Henry IV. The first definite performance was on 1 January 1625 at Whitehall as The First Part of Sir John Falstaff.
Evidence: as with Richard II, the play uses Samuel Daniel's The First Four Books of the Civil Wars as a source, meaning it could not have been written earlier than 1595. The fact that it is a direct sequel to Richard II would further limit the date of composition to no later than 1597 as Shakespeare would not have wanted to wait too long to capitalise on the success of the previous play. The controversy regarding the Oldcastle character also helps date the play. Shakespeare was pressured into changing the name by the descendants of the historical Sir John Oldcastle, particularly William Brooke, 10th Baron Cobham, and his son Henry. William served as Lord Chamberlain from August 1596 to March 1597, and only in that period would he have had the authority to demand the alteration of a play which he found objectionable. This could indicate an initial performance in late 1596 or early 1597, suggesting composition took place roughly around the same time.

=== The Merry Wives of Windsor (1597) ===
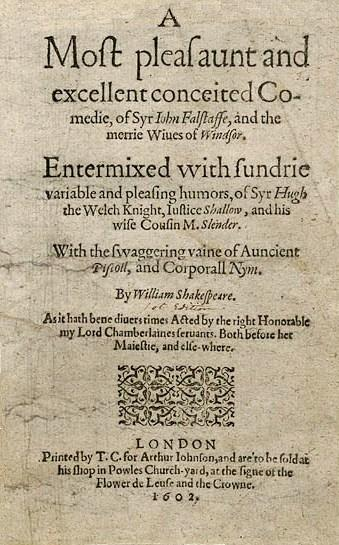
1602 quarto of The Merry Wives of Windsor

First official record: entered into the Stationers' Register by John Busby on 18 January 1602 as "A booke called An excellent and pleasant conceited commedie of Sir John Faulstof and the merry wyves of Windesor."
First published: version of the play published in quarto in 1602 as A most pleasaunt and excellent conceited Comedie, of Syr John Falstaffe, and the merrie Wives of Windsor. Entermixed with sundrie variable and pleasing humours, of Syr Hugh the Welch knight, Justice Shallow, and his wise cousin M. Slender. With the swaggering vaine of Auncient Pistoll, and Corporall Nym (printed by Thomas Creede for Arthur Johnson). This text was republished in 1619 as part of William Jaggard's "False Folio" (printed by Thomas Pavier).
Additional information (publication): the 1602 quarto text has traditionally been considered a bad quarto, and was one of the original texts in relation to which Alfred W. Pollard coined the term. The quarto text is 1620 lines, compared to the 2729 line Folio text. 4.1, 5.1, 5.2, 5.3, 5.4 and much of 5.5 are absent from Q1, 3.4 and 3.5 are transposed and numerous speeches within individual scenes are also transposed. In his 1910 edition of the quarto text, W.W. Greg wrote "my own study of Merry Wives has led me to doubt whether any limit can be set to the possible perversion which a text may suffer at the hands of a reporter." However, more recent editions of the play, such as David Crane's 1997 edition for the New Cambridge Shakespeare and Giorgio Melchiori's 2000 edition for the third series of the Arden Shakespeare, have questioned the likelihood of memorial reconstruction being wholly responsible for the text, arguing for a more complex provenance.
First recorded performance: on 4 November 1604, in the banqueting hall of Whitehall Palace, performed by the King's Men for Charles I.
Evidence: writing in 1702, John Dennis claimed Shakespeare wrote the play in fourteen days at the behest of Queen Elizabeth. In 1709, Nicholas Rowe claimed Elizabeth commissioned Shakespeare to write the play, because she liked the character of Falstaff so much in 1 Henry IV that she wanted to see him in love. Neither claim is given much weight by scholars today. The composition of the play definitely postdates the Oldcastle controversy concerning 1 Henry IV, as the character is, and seemingly always was, called Falstaff in Merry Wives. One area examined by scholars in an effort to date the composition of the play is where in the plot of the Henriad the narrative of Merry Wives is supposed to take place. 1 Henry IV was definitely written by early 1597. Henry V was completed by September 1599. 2 Henry IV was written at some point between these two. Exactly where Merry Wives fits into the sequence is unknown, but attempts to date the composition of the play by locating the plot within the overall Henriad have proved fruitless. The plot of Merry Wives does not fit into the plot of the Henriad in any chronological or logical sense; there are continuity problems no matter where in the sequence one locates the play. For example, Falstaff and Mistress Quickly don't know one another at the start of Merry Wives, whereas in 1 Henry IV, they have known one another for over thirty years. John Jowett, editor of the play for the Oxford Shakespeare: Complete Works, argues it is not supposed to fit into the Henriad at all, it is "essentially an Elizabethan comedy, the only one that Shakespeare set firmly in England. The play is full of details that would have been familiar to Elizabethan Londoners, and the language is colloquial and up to date." Textual evidence and topical allusions led John Leslie Hotson to argue the play was specifically commissioned for a performance on Saint George's Day (23 April) 1597, as part of the celebrations for the Garter Feast (an annual meeting of the Order of the Garter). Hotson believes the play was commissioned for the Feast by George Carey, 2nd Baron Hunsdon, who had recently succeeded his father as patron of Shakespeare's Lord Chamberlain's Men and was to be one of the newly elected knights. Hotson contends the play was his contribution to the festivities. If one accepts this theory, it suggests that Shakespeare interrupted his composition of 2 Henry IV to hastily compose Merry Wives after Hunsdon's commission. This is important because traditionally, Merry Wives has been dated c. 1600, a date supported by verse analysis. However, verse makes up very little of the play, and if Shakespeare was writing extremely fast, the reliability of the test would be compromised. Scholars who accept the theory that Shakespeare stopped writing 2 Henry IV to write Merry Wives theorise that he did so somewhere between 3.2 and 4.2.

=== Henry IV, Part 2 (1597–1598) ===
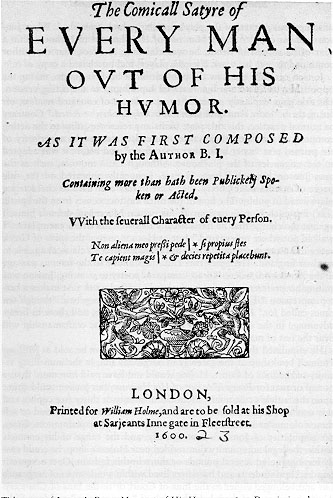
1600 quarto of Ben Jonson's Every Man out of His Humour, which contains an allusion to 2 Henry IV.

First official record: entered into the Stationers' Register by Andrew Wise and William Aspley on 23 August 1600 as "the seconde parte of the history of Kinge Henry the iiij^{th} with the humours of Sir Iohn Ffallstaff." Jointly entered with Much Ado About Nothing.
First published: published in quarto in 1600 as The second part of Henrie the fourth, continuing to his death, and coronation of Henrie the fift. With the humours of Sir John Falstaffe, and swaggering Pistoll (printed by Valentine Simmes for Andrew Wise and William Aspley) The 1623 Folio text appears under the title The Second Part of Henry the Fourth, Containing his Death: and the Coronation of King Henry the Fift.
First recorded performance: probable performance took place on or around 14 February 1613, when either 1 Henry IV or 2 Henry IV (or both) were performed at court as part of the celebrations for the marriage of Princess Elizabeth to Frederick V, Elector Palatine. A play performed under the title Sir Iohn Falstaffe is thought to refer to 2 Henry IV. It is unlikely to refer to 1 Henry IV as a play under the name The Hotspur would seem to indicate that play. Additionally, a list of plays under consideration for court performance in 1620, compiled by George Buck, Master of the Revels, mentions the "Second part of Falstaffe not plaid theis 7. yeres." This would seem to confirm the 1613 performance as 2 Henry IV, as, due to the lack of republication of the initial 1600 quarto text, it is known that 2 Henry IV was not nearly as popular as 1 Henry IV (which was republished five times prior to 1623).
Evidence: as a sequel to 1 Henry IV and a prequel to Henry V, the play was obviously written at some point between the two. We know that 1 Henry IV was probably written by early 1597 at the latest, and that Henry V was written by September 1599, so 2 Henry IV can be dated from early 1597 to September 1599. There is some tentative evidence to narrow the date further, however. For example, the fact that Falstaff seems to have been called Falstaff from the very inception of 2 Henry IV would suggest the play was written after the censoring of 1 Henry IV in 1596/1597. The fact that the 25 February 1598 Stationers' Register entry for 1 Henry IV does not identify it as the first part of a two-part play has led some scholars to speculate that 2 Henry IV could not have been completed by that date. There is also a reference to the character of Justice Shallow in Ben Jonson's Every Man out of His Humour, which was first acted in 1599, indicating the play was well enough known by then for an audience to understand the allusion. All of this seems to place the date of composition as somewhere in late 1597/early 1598.

=== Much Ado About Nothing (1598–1599) ===
First official record: mentioned in the Stationers' Register on a flyleaf dated 4 August 1600 as "The cōmedie of muche A doo about nothinge." Grouped with Henry V, As You Like It and Ben Jonson's Every Man in His Humour under the heading "to be staied." Who wrote the note, the exact nature of the grouping of plays, and the meaning of "to be staied" is unknown, but is thought to have been an attempt by the Lord Chamberlain's Men to prevent unauthorised printing of the plays listed. The play was formally entered into the Register by Andrew Wise and William Aspley on 23 August as "Muche a Doo about nothing." Jointly entered with 2 Henry IV.
First published: published in quarto in 1600 as Much adoe about Nothing (printed by Valentine Simmes for Andrew Wise and William Aspley).
First recorded performance: on or around 14 February 1613, when the play was performed at court as part of the celebrations for the marriage of Princess Elizabeth to Frederick V, Elector Palatine.
Evidence: the play is not mentioned in Meres's Palladis Tamia, which tentatively suggests it had not been performed by September 1598. Although it has been suggested that Much Ado could be Love's Labour's Won, the discovery of the list written by Christopher Hunt in 1603 refutes this possibility, as Hunt mentions Love's Labour's Won three years after Much Ado had been published under its own name. Furthermore, the quarto text includes the name "Kempe" as a speech heading throughout 4.2. This is universally recognised as referring to William Kempe, the leading comic actor of the Lord Chamberlain's Men, with the inference being that the role of Dogberry was specifically written for him. However, Kempe left the Lord Chamberlain's Men sometime in early 1599, suggesting the play must have been written before then. This suggests a date of composition in late 1598 and/or early 1599.

=== Henry V (1599) ===
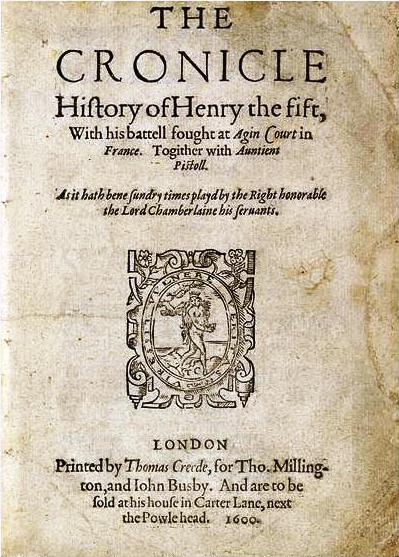
1600 quarto of Henry V

First official record: mentioned in the Stationers' Register on a flyleaf dated 4 August 1600 as "Henry the ffift." Grouped with Much Ado About Nothing, As You Like It and Ben Jonson's Every Man in His Humour under the heading "to be staied." Who wrote the note, the exact nature of the grouping of plays, and the meaning of "to be staied" is unknown, but is thought to have been an attempt by the Lord Chamberlain's Men to prevent unauthorised printing of the plays listed. Henry V was formally entered into the Register by Thomas Pavier on 14 August as "The historye of Henrye the v^{th} w^{th} the battell of Agencourt."
First published: version of the play published in quarto in 1600 as The cronicle history of Henry the fift, with his battell fought at Agin Court in France. Togither with Auntient Pistoll (printed by Thomas Creede for Thomas Millington and John Busby). This text was republished in 1602 (by Creede for Thomas Pavier) and 1619, as part of William Jaggard's "False Folio" (printed by Pavier). The 1619 text is falsely dated 1608. The 1623 First Folio text appears under the title The Life of Henry the Fift.
Additional information (publication): the 1600 quarto text has traditionally been considered a bad quarto, and was one of the original texts in relation to which Alfred W. Pollard coined the term. However, in his 2000 edition of the quarto text for the New Cambridge: The Early Quartos series, Andrew Gurr argues that although the text was partially constructed from memory, it also represents a performance text, an abridged version of the Folio text constructed by the Lord Chamberlain's Men specifically for performance.
First recorded performance: 7 January 1605 at court, performed by the Lord Chamberlain's Men for King James.
Evidence: of all Shakespeare's plays, Henry V is perhaps the easiest to date. A reference by the Chorus to the 1599 Irish expedition of Robert Devereux, Earl of Essex, (5.0.29–34) means the play was most likely written sometime between 27 March 1599 (when Essex left for Ireland) and 24 September 1599 (when he returned in disgrace).

=== Julius Caesar (1599) ===
First official record: mentioned in Thomas Platter the Younger's Diary on 21 September 1599.
First published: First Folio (1623), as The Tragedie of Ivlivs Cæsar.
First recorded performance: in his diary on 21 September 1599, Thomas Platter records "I went with my party across the water; in the straw-thatched house we saw the tragedy of the first Emperor Julius Caesar, very pleasingly performed, with approximately fifteen characters." This is almost universally accepted as a reference to a performance of Julius Caesar at the recently opened Globe Theatre.
Evidence: obviously, the play was completed by September 1599, and may have been composed specifically as the opening play for the new theatre. Other pieces of evidence also serve to link it to 1599. For example, the play's absence from Palladis Tamia suggests it had not been performed by September 1598. Furthermore, an apparent indebtedness to John Davies's Nosce teipsum at 1.2.51–58 and another to Samuel Daniels's Musophilus at 3.1.111–116 help situate the play in 1599. Musophilus was entered into the Stationers Register on 9 January of that year, and Nosce teipsum on 14 April. Both were published for the first time in 1599, fixing 1599 as the terminus post quem. Two allusions to the play in Jonson's Every Man Out of His Humour, registered on 8 April 1600, fix 1600 as the latest possible date of composition. Additionally, textual analysis has connected the play closely to Henry V, which was definitely written in 1599. In the fifth-act prologue of Henry V, the Chorus refers to "antique Rome," "plebeians" and "conqu'ring Caesar" (5.0.26–28), suggesting Shakespeare may already have had his mind on his next play. Metrically, Caesar is closest to Henry V, and a colloquialism-in-verse test places it between Henry V and As You Like It.

=== As You Like It (1599–1600) ===
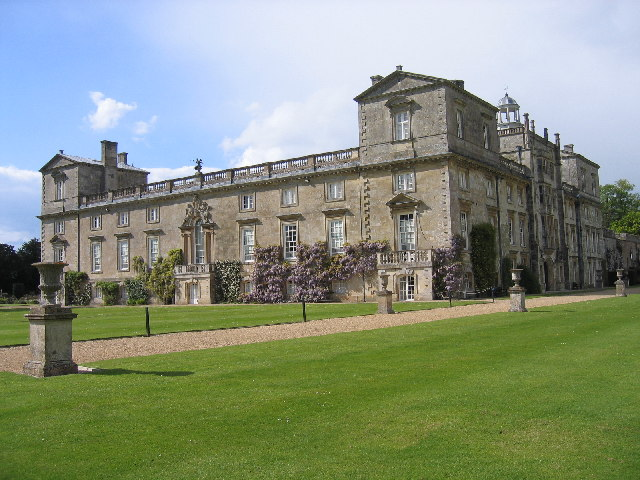
Wilton House; the location of a possible early staging of As You Like It.

First official record: mentioned in the Stationers' Register on a flyleaf dated 4 August 1600 as "As y^{o} like yt." Grouped with Much Ado About Nothing, Henry V and Ben Jonson's Every Man in His Humour under the heading "to be staied." Who wrote the note, the exact nature of the grouping of plays, and the meaning of "to be staied" is unknown, but is thought to have been an attempt by the Lord Chamberlain's Men to prevent unauthorised printing of the plays listed. The play was not formally entered into the Register until its entry for the 1623 First Folio.
First published: First Folio (1623).
First recorded performance: possibly on 20 February 1599 at Richmond Park for Queen Elizabeth. The evidence comes from a payment to the Lord Chamberlain's Men for performances of three unnamed plays on St. Stephen's Day 1598, New Year's Day 1599, and Shrove Tuesday 1599 (i.e. 20 February). Juliet Dusinberre believes Touchstone's reference to pancakes (1.2.50–51) provides evidence that As You Like It was the unnamed play performed on 20 February. Another possible early performance may have taken place in December 1603 at Wilton House. In 1865, William Johnson Cory said that whilst visiting Wilton, he was told of a letter from the Countess of Pembroke to her son, William Herbert, 3rd Earl of Pembroke, urging him to bring King James from Salisbury so he may see a performance of As You Like It at the house. James did come, residing at Wilton from 24 November to 12 December. Although Cory did not actually see the letter himself, and it has never been found or verified, a record of a payment to the Lord Chamberlain's Men for an unnamed play in December does exist, suggesting that something was performed at Wilton, but whether it was As You Like It seems impossible to ascertain. A Charles Johnson rewrite of the play, called Love in a Forest, was performed at Drury Lane on 9 January 1723. The earliest definite performance of the Shakespearean text was on 20 December 1740 at Drury Lane.
Evidence: As You Like It is a difficult play to date due to a lack of solid external evidence, forcing scholars to rely on topical allusions, parallels with other work and stylistic analysis. Obviously, it was completed by August 1600. It is not mentioned in Palladis Tamia, which could fix the date of composition as sometime between September 1598 and August 1600. In 1600, Thomas Morley published his First Book of Airs, which includes a variation of the page's song from 5.3 of As You Like It. According to the introduction of Airs, Morley compiled the book during the summer of 1599. It is unknown if Shakespeare borrowed from Morley, Morley from Shakespeare or if they collaborated, but irrespective of the exact nature of the relationship, it suggests that that particular passage was written between the summer of 1599 and early 1600. Possible topical allusions also locate the play in 1599/1600. For example, the line "the little wit that fools have was silenced" (1.2.82–83) may refer to the book burnings of June 1599, and Jacques' "All the world's a stage" monologue (2.7.139–166) is a possible reference to the motto of the newly opened Globe Theatre; "Totus mundus agit histrionem" ("all the world is a playground"), taken from Petronius. The Globe was open by 21 September 1599 at the latest, and possibly as early as 16 May 1599. Stylistic analysis has proved inconclusive in terms of establishing exactly where in the canon the play fits but has served to locate its composition to the turn of the century, and most scholars agree with a rough date of 1599 to 1600.

=== Hamlet (1599–1601) ===
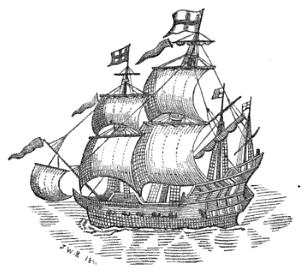
The Red Dragon, upon which the earliest recorded performance of Hamlet took place.

First official record: entered into the Stationers' Register by James Roberts on 26 July 1602 as "a booke called The Revenge of Hamlett Prince Denmarke."
First published: version of the play published in quarto in 1603 as The tragicall historie of Hamlet Prince of Denmarke (printed by Valentine Simmes for Nicholas Ling and John Trundell). A revised text, "newly imprinted, and enlarged to almost as much againe as it was, according to the true and perfect Coppie" was published in 1604/1605 (by Simmes for Ling). This text was republished in 1611 (by George Eld for John Smethwick) and 1622 (by William Stansby for Smethwick). The Folio text appears under the title The Tragedie of Hamlet, Prince of Denmarke.
Additional information (publication): the 1603 quarto text is considered a bad quarto, and was one of the original texts in relation to which Alfred W. Pollard coined the term. The 1603 quarto (Q1), the 1604/1605 quarto (Q2) and the 1623 Folio (F1) texts differ substantially from one another. Q1 is roughly 2200 lines, whilst Q2 is roughly 3800 lines. F1 is 230 lines shorter than Q2 but does include 77 lines not found in either Q1 or Q2. Verbal, grammatical and stylistic differences between the three texts number in the thousands. So different are Q1, Q2 and F1 that both Cambridge and Arden have issued two separate editions of the play; Cambridge published their standard scholarly edition in 1985, edited by Philip Edwards. In 1998, they followed this with a scholarly edition of the 1603 quarto as part of their Early Quartos series, edited by Kathleen O. Irace. Similarly, in 2006, Arden published two editions of the play; the standard edition (which uses Q2 as the control text) and a second edition, under the title Hamlet: The Texts of 1603 and 1623, both editions edited by Ann Thompson and Neil Taylor. The exact nature of the relationship between the three texts is still under debate. There is also the problem of Ur-Hamlet, a possible source used by Shakespeare, now lost. Some scholars, however, feel that Ur-Hamlet (if it ever existed, which many doubt) was most likely an early draft.
First recorded performance: the entry in the Stationers' Register in July 1602 states that the play was "latelie Acted by the Lo: Chamberleyne his servantes." The title page of Q1 states that it had been performed in London, at Cambridge and Oxford universities, "and else-where." However, there is no record of any of these performances. The first definite performance of the play took place on a ship called the Red Dragon, anchored off the coast of Africa, on 5 September 1607. The evidence for this comes from Thomas Rundall's Narratives of Voyages Towards the North-East: 1496–1631 (1849). Rundall includes extracts from the journal of Captain William Keeling, who was in charge of three ships sponsored by the East India Company that left England for India in March 1607, but were almost immediately separated. The Red Dragon, Keeling's flagship, was beset by storms and anchored off what is now Sierra Leone for six weeks. According to Keeling, the crew performed Hamlet on the nights of 5 September and "31 September" (presumably 1 October), and Richard II on the night of 30 September. There has been some argument as to the authenticity of Keeling's journal entry. Prior to Rundall's book, Keeling's journal had been published in 1625, but the references to Hamlet and Richard II were not included by the editor, Samuel Purchas. In his 1898 book, Life of Shakespeare, Sidney Lee claimed the entire Red Dragon episode was probably a forgery by John Payne Collier, and in 1950, Sydney Race revealed that the relevant pages were missing from the original journal and argued that a ship's crew would be incapable of mastering two of Shakespeare's most difficult plays. However, William Foster pointed out that the entire journal had been missing since at least 1900, not just the relevant pages, and he countered Race by arguing that the crew probably performed truncated and edited versions of each play. The general feeling amongst scholars today is that the record is genuine. The earliest recorded performance of the play in England took place at court over Christmas 1619.

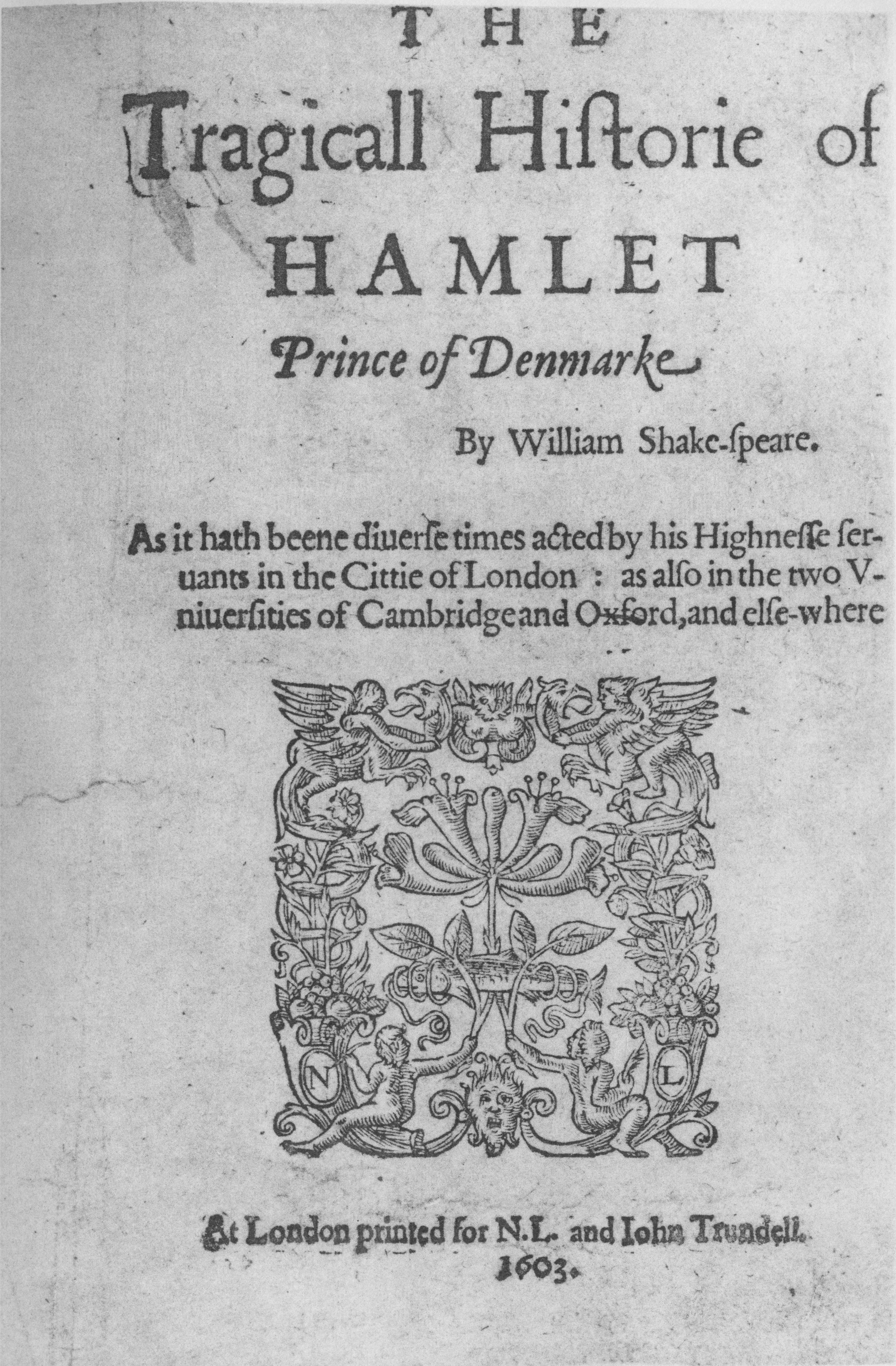
1603 quarto of Hamlet

Evidence: because the three versions of Hamlet which appeared in 1603, 1604/1605 and 1623 differ so much from one another, dating the play is exceptionally difficult. In his 1987 edition of the play for the Oxford Shakespeare (which uses F1 as the control text), G. R. Hibbard writes "exactly when Hamlet was composed depends in part on which Hamlet is under consideration, for the play exists in three different forms." Hamlet was originally written sometime between September 1599 and July 1602 (when it was registered in the Stationers Register). The terminus post quem of September 1599 is fixed by a reference to Julius Caesar (3.2.98–99), the earliest recorded performance of which took place in September 1599. Another important internal piece of evidence is found in Rosencrantz and Guildenstern's report to Hamlet of "an aerie of children, little eyases, that cry out on the top of question and are most tyrannically clapped for't" (2.2.335–337). This is probably a reference to the Children of the Chapel, a playing company of young boys who performed at Blackfriars with such success as to make them genuine rivals to the adult acting companies. The subsequent comment, "there has been much to-do on both sides; and the nation holds it no sin to tar them to controversy. There was, for a while, no money bid for argument, unless the poet and the player went to cuffs in to the question" (2.2.348–352) is thought to refer to the War of the Theatres between Ben Jonson on one side and John Marston and Thomas Dekker on the other. The conflict began in 1599 when Marston mocked Jonson with the character of Chrisoganus in Histriomastix. Jonson responded by satirizing Marston's style in Every Man out of His Humour, leading to a series of plays in which the various writers mocked one another. The "conflict" concluded in 1601, when Dekker mocked Jonson with the character of Horace in Satiromastix, at which point Jonson and Marston apparently reconciled. Both the reference to the child actors and the War of the Theatres suggest a date of composition of 1600–1601. Additionally, in his 1598 copy of the works of Geoffrey Chaucer, Gabriel Harvey has written in a marginal note that Shakespeare's "Lucrece & his tragedie of Hamlet, prince of Denmarke, have it in them, to please the wiser sort." Harvey also mentions the Earl of Essex as still alive, which would suggest he wrote the note prior to 25 February 1601, when Essex was executed. This would seem to narrow the date of composition to between September 1599 and February 1601. However, not all scholars accept that Harvey's note can be used for dating purposes, mainly due to the fact that it implies Thomas Watson (d.1592) and Edmund Spenser (d.1599) are both still alive, but also mentions John Owen's 1607 epigrams, making it impossible to ascertain exactly when the note was written. Stylistic evidence has also been cited, usually as illustrative of a date of composition of 1600 or 1601, with subsequent revisions up to, and possibly beyond, 1605. This dating, however, is far from universally accepted.

=== Twelfth Night (1601) ===
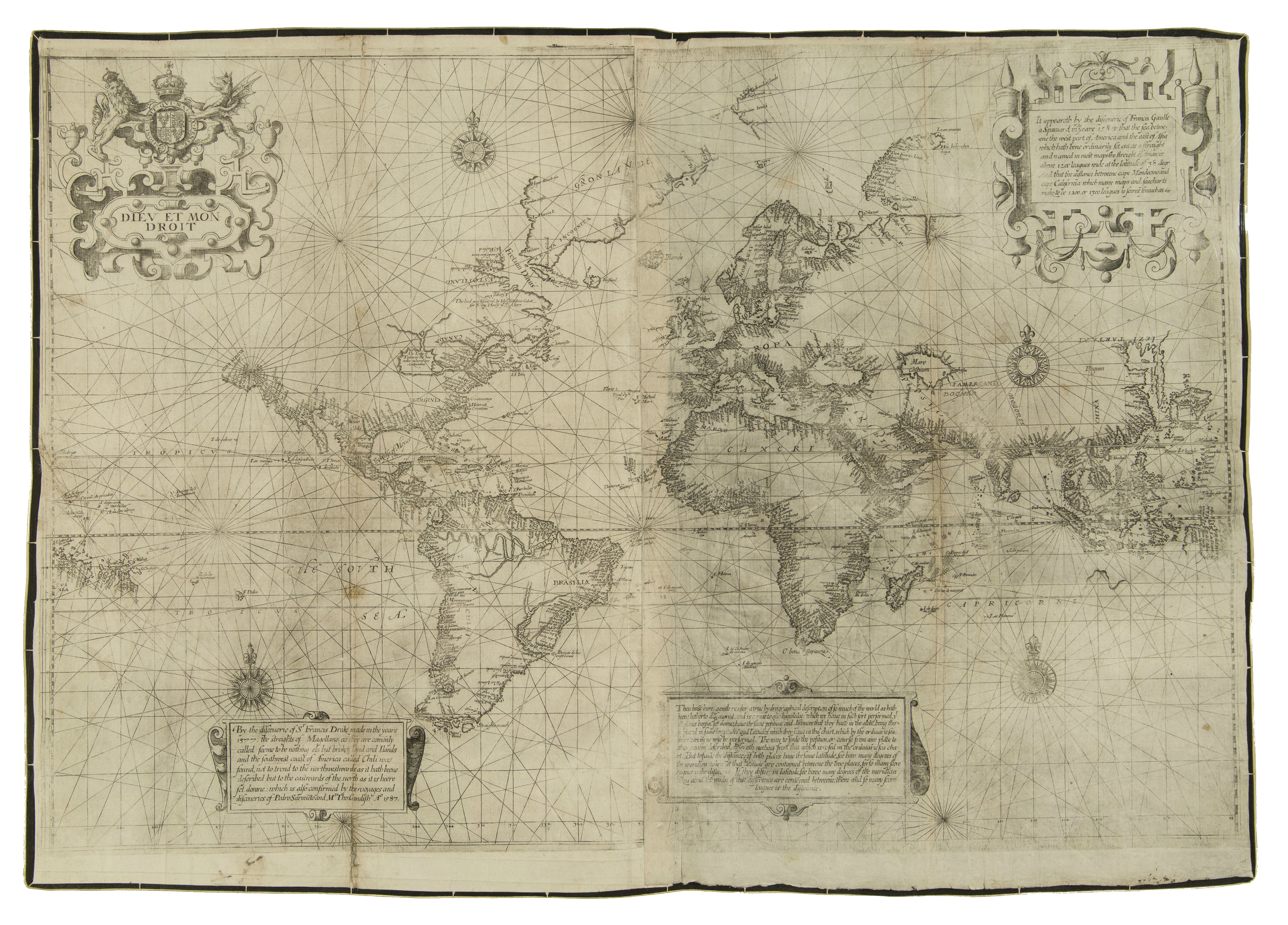
Edward Wright's "A Chart of the World on Mercator's Projection" (c. 1599), published in Richard Hakluyt's 1600 edition of The Principal Navigations... and thought to have been referenced in the play.

First official record: John Manningham's diary on 2 February 1602.
First published: First Folio (1623), as Twelfe Night, Or what you will.
First recorded performance: John Manningham saw the play performed at the Middle Temple on Candlemas (2 February) 1602. The acting company is unrecorded but is thought to have been the Lord Chamberlain's Men.
Evidence: obviously the play was complete by February 1602. However, John Leslie Hotson believes it to have been written earlier, probably in late 1600. On the night of the Feast of the Epiphany (6 January) 1601, it is known the Lord Chamberlain's Men performed a play at Whitehall for Queen Elizabeth and Virginio Orsini, Duke of Bracciano. However, although official records contain much information on the preparations for the play, the name of the play itself is never mentioned. An official description of the unnamed play dictates "that [it] shall be best furnished with rich apparel, have great variety and change of music and dances, and of a subject that may be most pleasing to her Majesty." Hotson believes the unnamed play of 1601 was Twelfth Night, the title of which refers to the Twelfth Night celebrations which bridge Christmas and the epiphany. Most scholars disagree with Hotson on this point, however, believing the description could just as easily fit Much Ado as Twelfth Night, and arguing that rather than Shakespeare naming the character of Orsino in honour of the Duke who would be watching the play, it is more likely he took the name after meeting the Duke prior to writing it. Topical allusions serve only to fix 1599 as a terminus post quem. Maria makes reference to "the new map with the augmentation of the Indies" (3.2.74). This probably refers to Edward Wright's "Chart of the World on Mercator's Projection" in Certaine Errors in Navigation, which was published in 1599, or, less likely, to the second edition of Richard Hakluyt's Principall Navigations, Voiages, and Discoveries of the English Nation, published the same year. Two references to the "sophy" (2.5.170 and 3.4.269) refer to the Shah of Persia, who at the time was Abbas I. In 1599, Sir Anthony Shirley had returned from his travels in Persia, publishing his memoirs in 1600 to great success. This is further evidence of composition around the turn of the century. However, Feste's avoidance of the phrase "out of my element" because the word "element" is "overworn" (3.1.58) may be a reference to Thomas Dekker's Satiromastix, which mocks the expression "out of my element" three times. Satiromastix was first acted in 1601, meaning, if one accepts the reference, 1601 must be the earliest possible date of composition.

=== Troilus and Cressida (1600–1602) ===
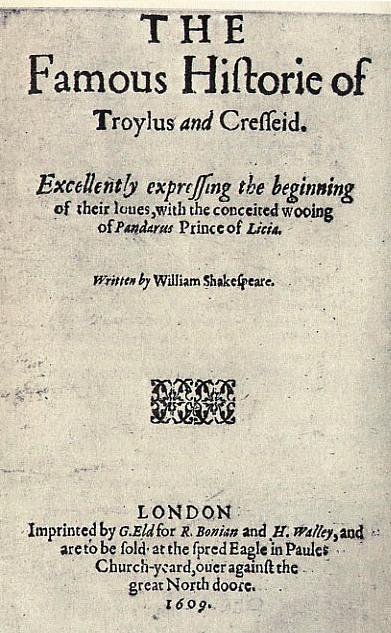
1609 Q^{b} edition of Troilus and Cressida

First official record: entered into the Stationers' Register by James Roberts on 7 February 1603 as "the booke of Troilus and Cresseda."
First published: two different versions of the play were published in quarto in 1609. Q^{a} was published under the title The Historie of Troylus and Cresseida. Q^{b} was published under the title The Famous Historie of Troylus and Cresseid. Excellently expressing the beginning of their loves, with the conceited wooing of Pandarus, Prince of Licia. Both Q^{b} and Q^{b} were printed by George Eld for Richard Bonian and Henry Walley. Both versions of the play are identical apart from a different title page, and a note to the reader added to Q^{b}. The Folio text appears under the title The Tragedie of Troylus and Cressida.
Additional information (publication): Troilus and Cressida has attained a degree of infamy amongst Shakespearean scholars due to the range of unanswered questions it raises. For example, it is unknown if the play was ever performed in Shakespeare's day. Q^{a} claims it had been acted by the King's Men at the Globe, but Q^{b} omits the reference to the King's Men and instead includes a note headed "A neuer writer, to an euer reader. Newes," which claims the play has never been staged. Apparently, when Q^{a} was at press, the printers were informed that the play had not been performed and they therefore prepared a cancel title page and the note to the reader, which claims it is a sign of the quality of the play that it has never been publicly staged ("never staled with the stage, never clapper-clewed with the palms of the vulgar"). It is unknown, however, which text is correct – Q^{a} or Q^{b}. E. A. J. Honigmann has suggested that the play was written early in 1601, but never acted because of fears it may have been seen as a political allegory sympathetic to Robert Devereux, Earl of Essex.
First recorded performance: Troilus and Cressida was never popular on stage, apparently even in Shakespeare's day, until the latter half of the twentieth century, when there was an explosion of productions including many that were considered scandalous and highly experimental. The earliest known performance is an adaptation by John Dryden, called Troilus and Cressida, Or Truth Found Too Late, which was staged at the Duke's Theatre in 1679. Although there is a record of a performance at Smock Alley in Dublin sometime prior to 1700, it is unknown if this production was of Shakespeare's original text, or Dryden's adaptation, which was being revived as late as 1734. The earliest known production of the Shakespearean text was a heavily edited German language all-male production on 23 April 1898, at the Staatstheater am Gärtnerplatz in Munich. The first known production of the play in the United Kingdom was on 1 June 1907 at the Great Queen Street Theatre, directed by Charles Fry, using a mixture of amateur and professional actors in modern dress.
Evidence: just as its early performance history is far from clear, so too is the date of the play's composition. 1598 can be fixed as a terminus post quem, as Shakespeare definitely used George Chapman's Seven Books of the Illiad of Homer as a source, which was entered into the Stationers' Register in April 1598. Some scholars have attempted to link the play to the War of the Theatres, particularly the reference to the "Prologue armed" (l.23), which may be an allusion to the prologue in Jonson's The Poetaster (1601), in which an obviously infuriated Jonson lashes out at his detractors. However, the prologue in Troilus was not included in either Q^{a} or Q^{b}, making it difficult to directly connect it to the squabbles between the playwrights. Stylistic evidence is also inconclusive. A rare word test places it closest to Hamlet. Ants Oras's pause test places it after Henry IV and before Othello, but is unable to determine exactly where the play lies between the two. A colloquialism-in-verse test places it after Hamlet and before Twelfth Night. Metrical analysis places it after Hamlet and Twelfth Night but before Measure for Measure and Othello. This all suggests a date of composition of somewhere between 1600 and 1602, but the exact order in which Hamlet, Twelfth Night and Troilus and Cressida were written seems impossible to determine.

=== Sir Thomas More (1592–1595; Shakespeare's involvement, 1603–1604) ===
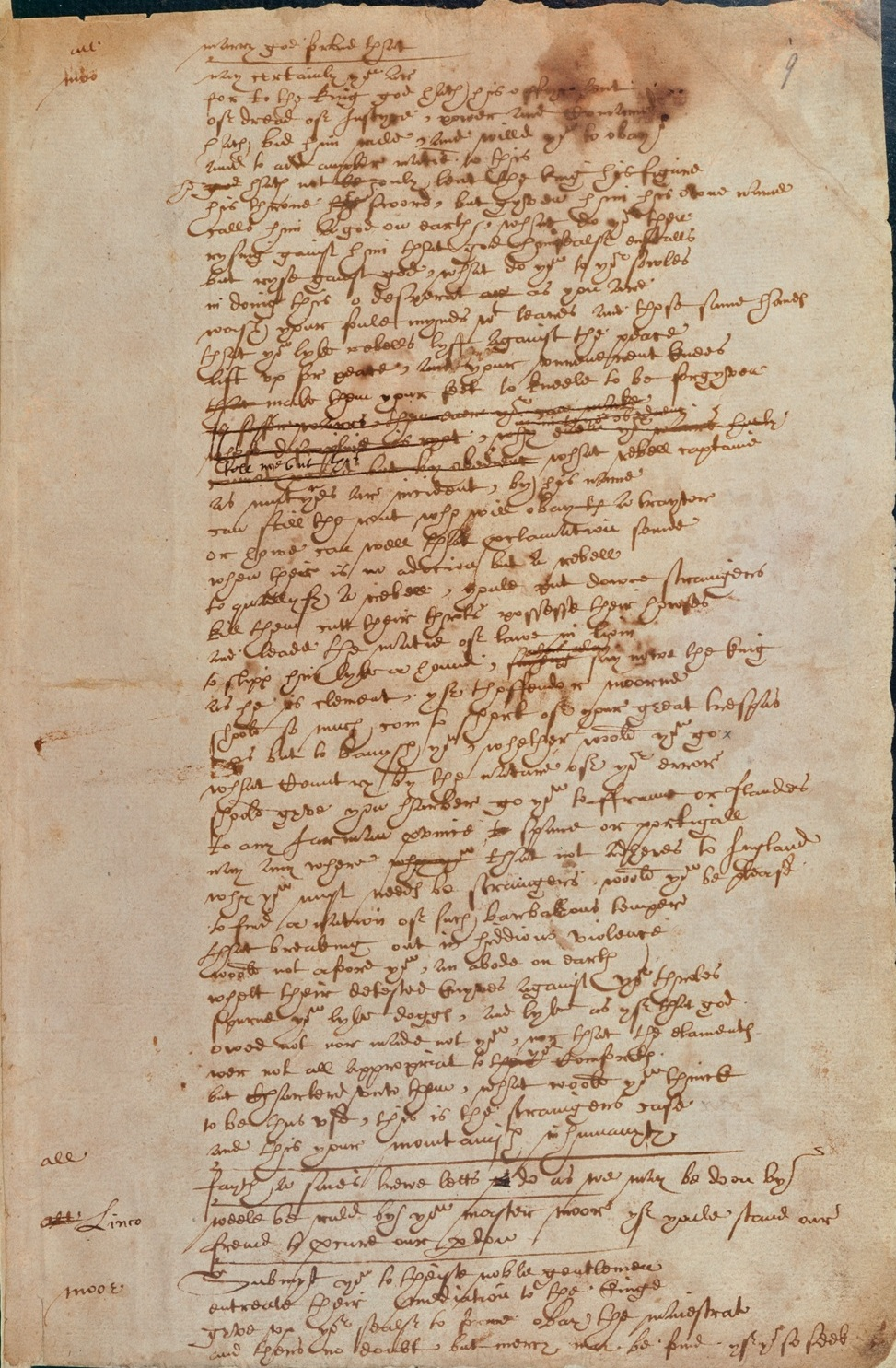
MS page of Sir Thomas More, believed to be in Shakespeare's handwriting.

First official record: in the diary of Thomas Hearne, on 17 January 1728. Hearne wrote "On the 12th of Oct. last M^{r} Murray lent me a thin folio Paper MS done or sowed up in a Vellum Cover; on w^{ch} it is intitled, The Booke of Sir Thomas Moore. This I have read over. It is wrote in the nature of a Play or Interlude, soon after his death, I believe. Tho' it appears from thence plainly, what a great, wise, good and charitable man Sir Thomas was, yet there is no particular of History in it, but what we know already. It is the original, being in many places strangely scored & in others so altered that 'tis hard to make some things out."
First published: 1844, edited by Alexander Dyce for the Shakespeare Society. Published under the name Sir Thomas More, A Play; now first printed.
Additional information (attribution): that Shakespeare was involved in the composition of Sir Thomas More is now generally agreed upon. The first major scholarly edition of the play was published by Manchester University Press in 1990, under its "Revels Plays" banner, edited by Vittorio Gabrieli and Giorgio Melchiori. In 2011, the Arden Shakespeare also published a full scholarly edition, edited by John Jowett (who had also edited the play for the 2nd edition of the Oxford Shakespeare: Complete Works in 2005), The Revels Plays edition is subtitled "A play by Anthony Munday and Others. Revised by Henry Chettle, Thomas Dekker, Thomas Heywood and William Shakespeare." The Arden edition includes the subheading "Original Text by Anthony Munday and Henry Chettle. Censored by Edmund Tilney. Revisions co-ordinated by Hand C. Revised by Henry Chettle, Thomas Dekker, Thomas Heywood and William Shakespeare." The MS is a foul paper in the handwriting of Anthony Munday. Censorship notes are included throughout by Edmund Tilney, Master of the Revels. Revisions are by Chettle (Hand A), Dekker (Hand E), Heywood (Hand B) and, probably, Shakespeare (Hand D). Hand C is an unknown professional theatrical scribe who made several annotations on top of the alterations. Shakespeare is thought to have worked on Scene 6, based upon handwriting and stylistic analysis. He may also have worked on Scene 8, although this is based purely on stylistic analysis, as Scene 8 exists only in a transcribed version by Hand C. Shakespeare's name was first linked to the play by Richard Simpson in 1871. One year later, James Spedding elaborated upon and rejected some of Simpson's claims, but ultimately concurred that Hand D was Shakespeare's. In 1923, Shakespeare's Hand in the Play of Sir Thomas More saw a quintet of major scholars (Alfred W. Pollard, W. W. Greg, E. Maunde Thompson, J. Dover Wilson and R. W. Chambers) support the Shakespearean attribution. What is known for certain is that Hand D does bear a striking resemblance to the extant examples of Shakespeare's handwriting, and if it is not his handwriting, it is not the handwriting of any contemporary playwright whose handwriting has survived. Thus, the vast majority of contemporary paleographers believe that Hand D is that of William Shakespeare.
First recorded performance: it is unknown if the play was ever performed during Shakespeare's day, although due to its censorship problems, it is highly unlikely. The earliest recorded performance occurred at Birkbeck, University of London, in December 1922, where it was performed by the students and produced by members of the English department.
Evidence: the original play is traditionally believed to have been written sometime between 1592 and 1595 by Munday and Chettle. The early scenes of the play depict "Evil May Day", the name given to an anti-alien riot in London in May 1517. Anti-alien riots also occurred in 1593 and 1595, followed by the execution of the ringleaders. In the play, Henry VIII is depicted as being relatively merciful to the instigators of the riots, whereas in 1595, Queen Elizabeth showed no such leniency. The theory is that no playwright would have written a play which knowingly portrayed the current monarch in such a negative light when compared to a previous monarch, and as Munday was an occasional government spy, he would be even less likely to do so. This places the date of initial composition as prior to the 1595 executions but probably after the initial re-emergence of xenophobia in the autumn of 1592. Tilney's specific objections to the depiction of the riots and their aftermath suggest that he received the play when these issues were still considered sensitive. Due to these censorship issues, the play was probably laid aside until after the death of Queen Elizabeth in 1603, when Tilney's objections would have carried less weight. The revisions were made at this point, although without the participation of Munday. Several aspects of the revision work support a date of 1603–1604. For example, the additions contain twenty-seven profanities forbidden by the Act to Restrain Abuses of Players (1606), making it highly unlikely they were added after this date. There are also three references in Chettle's revision work to the court (Sc.13.64), the King (Sc.13.78–80) and "Lord Spend-All's Stuart's" (Sc.13.110) which are probably references to James I, who came to power in 1603. There are also several parallels with Chettle's The Tragedy of Hoffman (written between 1602 and 1604). Stylistic analysis of Scene 6 also supports this date. MacDonald P. Jackson's examination of vocabulary and pauses-in-verse place the material between Twelfth Night and Macbeth. A colloquialism-in-verse test places it after Twelfth Night and Troilus and Cressida.

=== Measure for Measure (1603–1604) ===
First official record: an entry in the Revels Account Book records a performance on 26 December 1604 of "Mesur for Mesur" by "Shaxberd."
First published: First Folio (1623).
First recorded performance: in the banqueting hall at Whitehall Palace on 26 December 1604, by the King's Men.
Evidence: obviously the play was written prior to December 1604. Internal evidence in the form of topical allusions suggest a date of 1603–1604. For example, 1.1.68–73 may allude to King James's dislike of crowds, which had become apparent in June 1603. Another example is found at 4.3.8 ("the old women were all dead"). This is thought to refer to the plague sweeping London, which had become a significant problem in May 1603. In 1.2, Lucio discusses with two gentlemen the possibility of an imminent peace, which would deprive soldiers of their occupation, followed immediately by a reference to a "sanctimonious pirate" (1.2.1–7). This may refer to King James's attempts in the summer of 1604 to negotiate a peace treaty with Spain, which would greatly reduce the activities of pirates. If these allusions are accurate, it would place the date of composition as somewhere between summer 1603 and late 1604. This date is supported by stylistic analysis. Both a colloquialism-in-verse test and a metrical test place Measure after Twelfth Night and Troilus, but before All's Well, and a rare word test links it most closely to All's Well.

=== Othello (1603–1604) ===
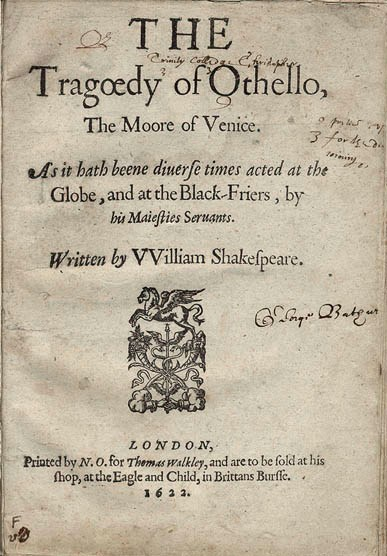
1622 quarto of Othello.

First official record: an entry in the Revels Account Book records a performance on 1 November 1604 of "The Moor of Venis" by "Shaxberd."
First published: version of the play published in quarto in 1622 as The Tragœdy of Othello, The Moore of Venice (printed by Nicholas Okes for Thomas Walkley). The Folio text appears under virtually the same name; The Tragedie of Othello, the Moore of Venice.
Additional information (publication): although the 1622 quarto text is not usually considered a bad quarto, it does differ significantly from the Folio text; F1 features roughly 160 lines not in Q1, and Q1 features twelve lines not in F1. The word ordering in some sentences is also different at several points throughout the play. In his 2001 edition of Q1 for the New Cambridge Shakespeare: The Early Quartos series, Scott McMillin argues the quarto was created by a professional theatrical scribe listening to the actors performing the play, and in this sense, it represents as pure a performance text as it is possible to have.
First recorded performance: in the banqueting hall at Whitehall Palace on 1 November 1604, by the King's Men.
Evidence: obviously the play was written by November 1604, and conventionally, it tends to be dated 1603–1604. An important element in this dating is Shakespeare's use of sources. For example, "burn like the mines of sulphur" (3.3.331), "one entire and perfect chrysolite" (5.2.143), and "Drops tears as fast as the Arabian trees/Their medicinal gum (5.2.349–350) are all thought to allude to Philemon Holland's translation of Pliny the Elder's Naturalus Historia, published in 1601. Additionally, Shakespeare probably took the information regarding the Turkish invasion of Cyprus (found in 1.3, 2.1 and 2.2) from Richard Knolles's General History of the Turks, which contains an epistle dated 30 September 1603. Specifically, he may have got the name Signor Angelo, mentioned in the sailor's report (1.3.16), from Angelus Sorianus, a Venetian commander discussed in Knolles. Also, the sailor's description of Turkish tactics, "The Ottomites, reverend and gracious,/Steering with due course toward the island of Rhodes,/Have there injoined with an after fleet" (1.3.34–36), may have come from Knolles's description of the Turkish fleets' actions prior to the siege of Nicosia. This suggests September 1603 as a likely terminus post quem. A possible terminus ante quem could be March 1604, when Philip Henslowe paid Thomas Dekker and Thomas Middleton for Part 1 of The Honest Whore, which contains the line "more savage than a barbarous Moor." Whilst not specific enough to be a definite reference to Shakespeare, it is known that Othello was immensely popular from its very inception, and such a reference would certainly have made sense to an audience at the time. It has also been argued that the play may have been written with an eye to pleasing the new king, James I. James was interested in Turkish history, and had written a poem in 1591 about the Battle of Lepanto. The poem was republished upon his accession in 1603, and a play set amongst the events which ultimately led to that battle would have had a special interest for the king. This would also support a date of 1603–1604. However, following H. C. Hart's 1928 edition of the play for the first series of the Arden Shakespeare, E. A. J. Honigmann dates the play mid-1601 to mid-1602, believing it to have influenced the bad quarto of Hamlet (in existence by July 1602). For example, he cites the substitution of the name "Montano" for "Reynaldo." Montano occurs in no other play except Othello, and Honigmann believes the actor who worked on Hamlet Q1 played Reynaldo, but had played Montano in an earlier production of Othello, and unconsciously mixed up the names. Additionally, MacDonald P. Jackson's pause analysis of the plays places Othello closest to Hamlet, Troilus and Cressida, Twelfth Night and Measure for Measure, in that order. The "average date" for these four plays is 1602. In his 2006 Oxford Shakespeare edition of the play, however, Michael Neill discusses Honigmann and Jackson's arguments, finding them suggestive, but not wholly persuasive, and ultimately settling for a "compromise date" of 1602–1603.

=== All's Well That Ends Well (1604–1605) ===
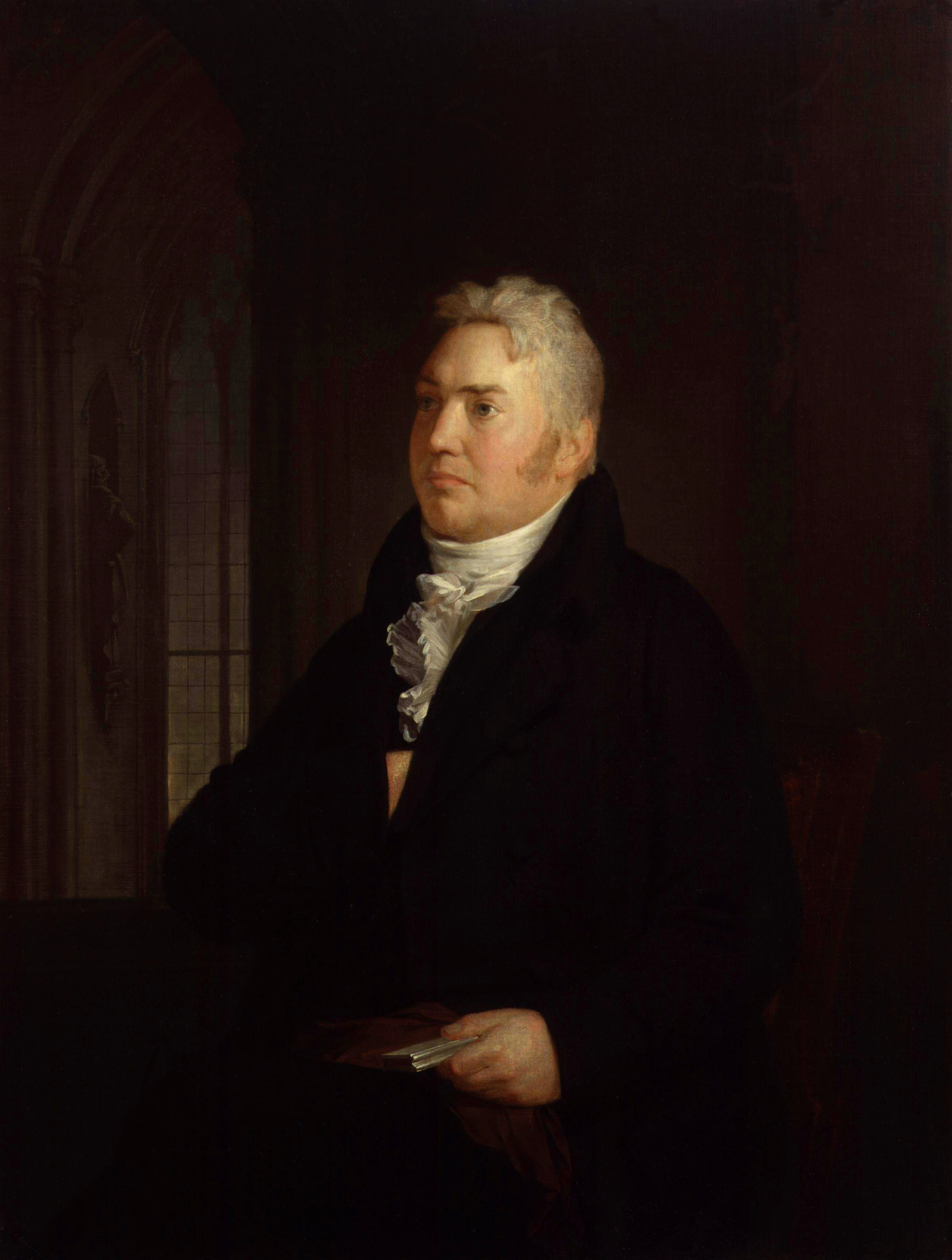
Samuel Taylor Coleridge by Washington Allston (1814). Coleridge's theory regarding the composition of All's Well was accepted for much of the nineteenth century.

First official record: mentioned in the Stationers' Register entry for the First Folio on 8 November 1623.
First published: First Folio (1623).
First recorded performance: at Goodman's Fields in 1741, billed as "written by Shakespeare and not acted since his time."
Evidence: a notoriously difficult play to date, with estimates ranging from 1595 to 1607. As an example of the disparity the play can cause in relation to its date, the 1997 revised edition of William Shakespeare: A Textual Companion from Oxford University Press dates the play 1604–1605, placing it between Othello and Timon of Athens. However, the 2nd edition of the Oxford Shakespeare: Complete Works in 2005, compiled by the same editors as the Textual Companion, date it 1606–1607, placing it between Antony and Cleopatra and Pericles, Prince of Tyre. Another example of scholarly mutability regarding the date of All's Well is Edmond Malone. In his 1778 chronology, Malone had accepted a theory originated by Thomas Percy and advanced by Richard Farmer that All's Well was Love's Labour's Won, and so dated the play 1598. However, by the time of his death, Malone had changed his mind, and in the Third Variorum edition of 1821, edited by James Boswell based on Malone's notes, he dated it 1606, based on a stylistic analysis of the anti-Puritan satire in 1.3, which he believed was written for King James's amusement. Another scholar who has attempted to tackle the dating issues is Samuel Taylor Coleridge. In 1813, he formulated the theory that the play "as it has come down to us, was written at two different, and rather distinct periods of the poet's life." Further elaborated upon by John Payne Collier, this theory was widely accepted throughout the nineteenth century, with most scholars arguing for an initial period of composition in the mid-1590s and a second period in the mid-1600s. The basis of the argument was that although the play exhibited stylistic and thematic connections with Hamlet and Measure for Measure, certain sections were seen as immature, and more akin to the type of material found in Two Gentlemen, Taming of the Shrew or Comedy of Errors. Often cited as immature were Helen's discussion about virginity in 1.1 and the rhyming couplets in 2.1 and 2.2. Similarly, Parolles was seen by some as an early study for Falstaff, and the Clown was often seen as being similar to Launce in Two Gentlemen; amusing, but not integrated into the plot particularly well. Modern scholarship, however, which tends to see the play as more complex and serious than earlier scholars, has rejected the two-periods-of-composition theory. Topical allusions in the play are sparse at best, with the only allusion recognised by most scholars being 1.3.94–95 ("wear the surplice of humility over the black gown of a big heart"), which is thought to be a reference to the enforcement of the surplice in 1604. Stylistically, a rare word test links the play most closely with Measure for Measure. A colloquialism-in-verse test places it after Measure and Othello but before Timon of Athens. A metrical test places it after Measure and Othello but before Lear. If one accepts the surplice reference, in tandem with the stylistic evidence, a date of 1604–1605 seems likely, but the exact order of composition of plays in this period remains open to speculation.

=== King Lear (1605–1606) ===
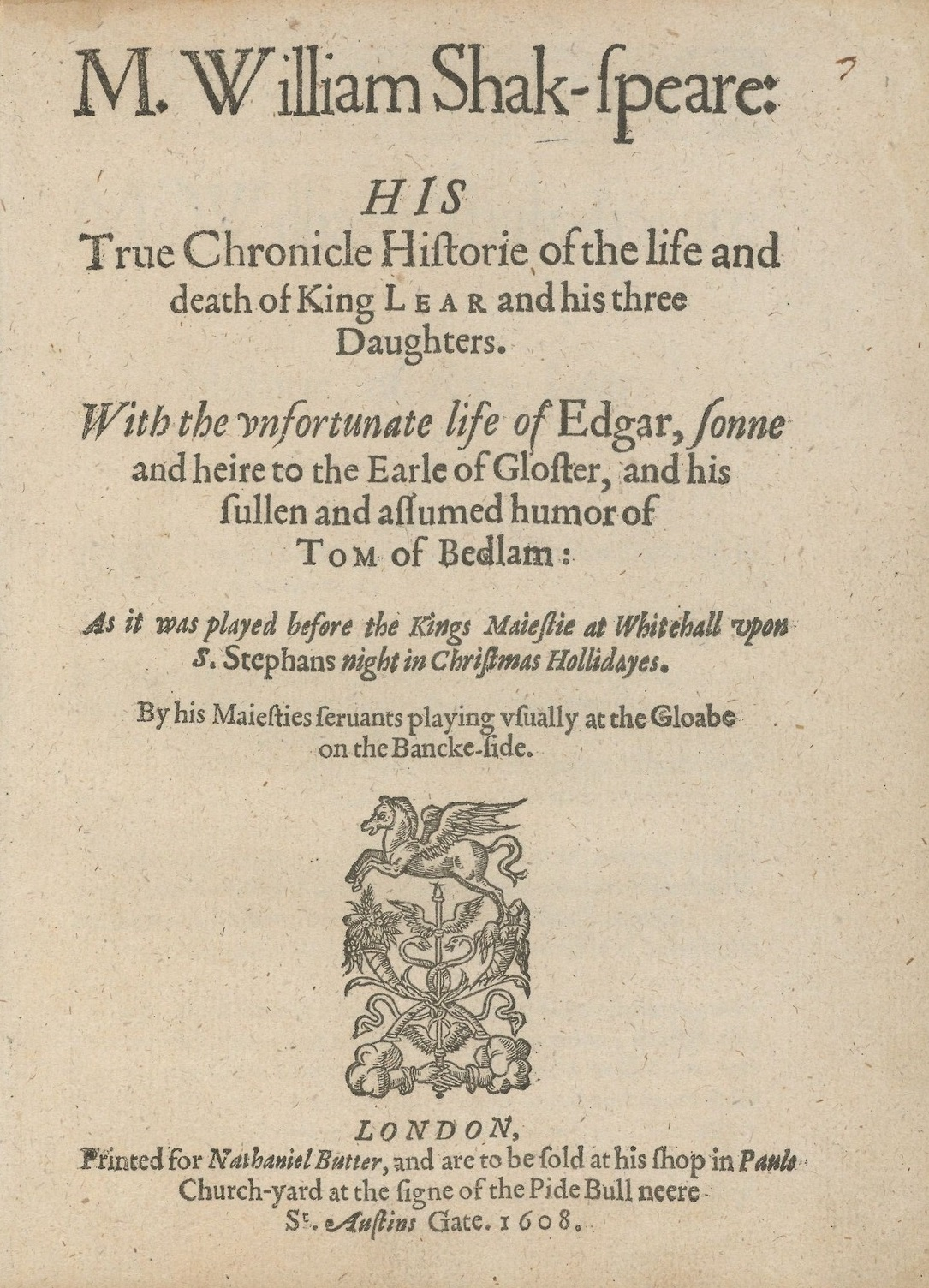
1608 quarto of King Lear.

First official record: entered into the Stationers' Register by Nathaniel Butter and John Busby on 26 November 1607 as "A booke called. M^{r} William Shakespeare his historye of Kinge Lear."
First published: version of the play published in quarto in 1608 as M. William Shakspeare: His True Chronicle Historie of the life and death of King Lear and his three Daughters. With the unfortunate life of Edgar, sonne and heire to the Earle of Gloster, and his sullen and assumed humor of Tom of Bedlam (printed by Nicholas Okes for Nathaniel Butter). This text was republished in 1619, as part of William Jaggard's "False Folio" (printed by Thomas Pavier). The 1623 Folio text appears under the title The Tragedie of King Lear.
Additional information (publication): although the 1608 quarto text is not usually considered a bad quarto per se, it does differ substantially from the Folio text; Q1 contains 285 lines not in F1, and F1 contains about 115 lines not in Q1. Additionally, over one thousand individual words are different between the two texts, each text has completely different punctuation, much of the verse in F1 is printed as prose in Q1, several speeches are given to different characters (including the final speech of the play – Albany in Q1, Edgar in F1) and each text features different scene divisions. The New Cambridge Shakespeare has published scholarly editions of both texts; F1 in 1992, and Q1 in 1994 as part of their Early Quartos series, both versions edited by Jay L. Halio. The 1999 Pelican Shakespeare edition of the play, edited by Stephen Orgel included both Q1 and F1, as well as the conflated text originally created by Alexander Pope in 1725. Similarly, the Oxford Shakespeare: Complete Works also included both versions of the play in their second edition of 2005, each edited by Gary Taylor. The Q1 text appears under the title The History of King Lear, and is dated 1605–1606. The Folio text appears under the title The Tragedy of King Lear and is dated 1610. Taylor believes Q1 represents an early draft of the play, written prior to performance, and F1 represents a revision written four or five years later, after numerous performances. He feels the differences in the two texts represent a "more theatrical" version of the play, which streamlines the plot and improves the characterisation of Edgar, at the expense of Kent and Albany. Although Halio disagrees with Taylor's assessment of F1 as "more theatrical," he reaches the same conclusion regarding the provenance of the text; Q1 was probably set from Shakespeare's foul papers, whilst F1 represents a performance text, probably altered by Shakespeare himself. Most scholars today are in agreement with this theory.
First recorded performance: according to the entry in the Stationers' Register in November 1607, the play was performed at Whitehall on 26 December 1606.

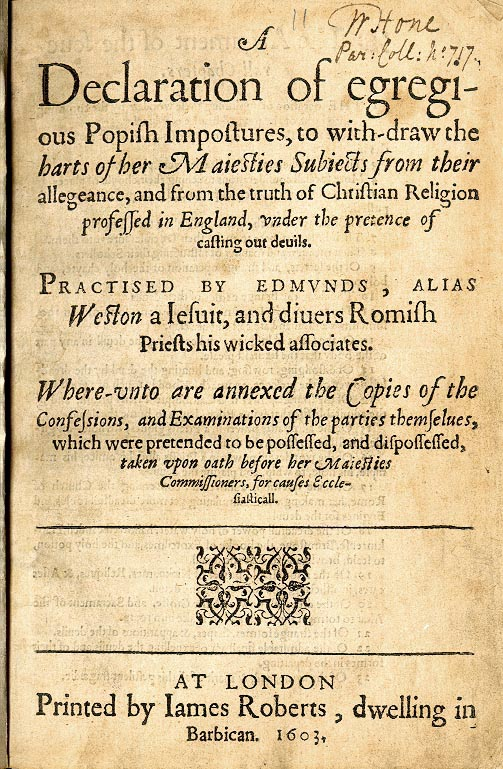
Samuel Harsnett's A Declaration of egregious Popish Impostures (1603), one of Shakespeare's sources for Lear.

Evidence: although the existence of two distinct texts complicates the issue of dating the play, what is known for certain is that it must have been completed (in some form) by December 1606. The play could not have been written any earlier than March 1603, as determined by Shakespeare's use of Samuel Harsnett's Declaration of Egregious Popish Impostures, from which he took some of Tom O'Bedlam's dialogue, which was entered into the Stationers' Register on 16 March 1603. However, the terminus post quem can possibly be pushed forward to 1605. Gary Taylor believes that Lear was influenced by George Chapman, Ben Jonson and John Marston's Eastward Ho, written in early 1605, and George Wilkins's The Miseries of Enforced Marriage, written no later than mid-1605. Furthermore, the line "these late eclipses in the sun and moon" (Sc.2.101) could refer to the lunar eclipse of 17 September and the solar eclipse of 2 October 1605. Of vital importance in dating the play, however, is the 1605 publication of an older version of the story, the anonymous play The true Chronicle History of King Leir and his three daughters, Gonorill, Ragan and Cordella. The publication of Leir in 1605 is often taken as evidence that Shakespeare's Lear was on stage by 1605. Leir was entered into the Stationers' Register on 14 May 1594, but had already been staged, and is usually dated to c.1590. There is no evidence it was ever published prior to 1605, and its sudden appearance in print over ten years after its composition could represent evidence of an attempt to capitalise on the success of Shakespeare's newly released play. On the other hand, in his 1997 edition of the play for the third series of the Arden Shakespeare, R. A. Foakes argues the 1605 publication of Leir inspired Shakespeare to write his own version of the story. There is little doubt that Shakespeare used Leir as a source, and Foakes believes that some of the parallels are too specific to represent Shakespeare's remembrance of a performance, rather he must have been working with a printed copy. Foakes also argues that the title page of Q1 specifically recalls the title page of the 1605 Leir to "alert" readers to the fact that Shakespeare's version is based on the older version, but is much improved. For example, this explains the reference to Edgar and Gloucester on the title page. These characters are not in Leir, and their inclusion in the title of Q1 serves as an advertisement that Shakespeare's version of the story is more complex than Leir. If Foakes is correct, it means Shakespeare could not have started writing Lear until May 1605. In his 2000 edition of the play for the Oxford Shakespeare, however, Stanley Wells argues there are echoes of Leir in plays as chronologically wide-ranging as The Taming of the Shrew, Richard II, Much Ado About Nothing and Hamlet, suggesting Shakespeare was very familiar with the play from at least the early 1590s. The publication of Leir in 1605 could also be connected to the case of Brian Annesley, a wealthy Kentishman, who may, or may not, have influenced Shakespeare in writing Lear. In 1603, Annesley's eldest daughter, Grace, tried to have him declared a lunatic so she would be placed in charge of his estate. She seems to have been supported in this by her husband (Sir John Wildgose), her sister (Christian) and her brother-in-law (William Sandys). However, Annesley's youngest daughter, Cordell, wrote to Robert Cecil, Earl of Salisbury, for help, and successfully blocked Grace's plan. Annesley died in July 1604, and most of his estate was left to Cordell. Whether or not Shakespeare knew about the case is unknown, but if he did, it provides more evidence for a date of composition in the period 1604–1606. Whatever the case regarding Leir and Annesley, however, Halio, Foakes, and Wells all date the initial composition of the play to 1605–1606. In regards to the revision of the text, stylistic analysis tends to view Q1 and F1 as two distinct texts, and in this sense, a rare word test, pause test and metrical test of Q1 all place it between Othello and Macbeth, and either immediately before or immediately after Timon of Athens. A rare word test of the passages unique to F1, however, place it closest to The Winter's Tale, Cymbeline, The Tempest and Henry VIII.

=== Timon of Athens (1605–1606) ===
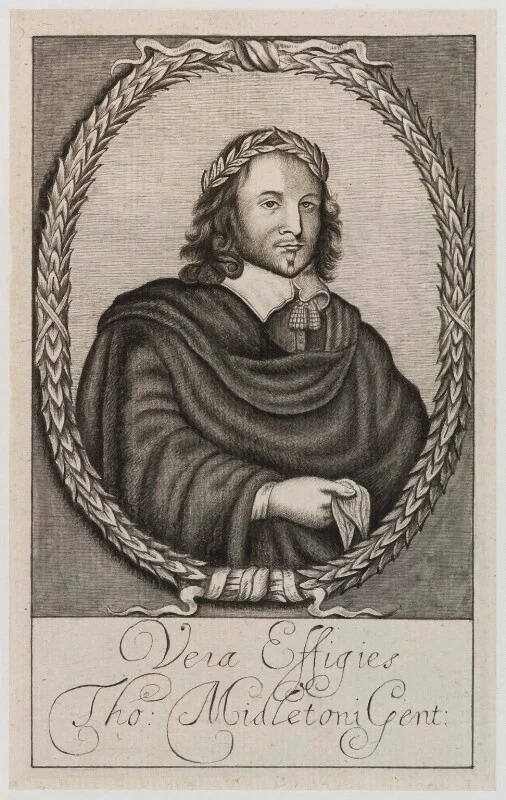
Thomas Middleton, who probably worked on Timon in some capacity.

First official record: mentioned in the Stationers' Register entry for the First Folio, on 8 November 1623.
First published: First Folio (1623), as The Life of Tymon of Athens.
First recorded performance: there is no known evidence of a performance in Shakespeare's lifetime. The earliest known production of the play was in 1674, when Thomas Shadwell wrote an adaptation under the title The History of Timon of Athens, The Man-hater. Multiple other adaptations followed over the next century, by writers such as Thomas Hull, James Love and Richard Cumberland. Although the earliest known performance of the straight Shakespearean text was at Smock Alley in Dublin in 1761, adaptations continued to dominate the stage until well into the twentieth century. The earliest known production of a predominantly Shakespearean version of the play in the United Kingdom was at Sadler's Wells in 1851. Adapted by Samuel Phelps, the production cut all scenes involving the Fool, the return of the Poet and the Painter and much of the sexual material. He also changed the ending, having a solemn Alcibiades marching to Timon's grave and reading the epitaph himself, a far less ambiguous ending than the original.
Additional information (attribution): dating Timon of Athens is rendered more difficult because of the probable involvement of Thomas Middleton. The play contains several narrative inconsistencies uncharacteristic of Shakespeare, an unusually unsatisfying dénouement, drastically different styles in different places and an unusually large number of long lines which don't scan. One theory is that the play as it appears in the First Folio is unfinished. E. K. Chambers believes Shakespeare began the play, but abandoned it due to a mental breakdown, never returning to finish it. F. W. Brownlow believes the play to have been Shakespeare's last, and remained uncompleted at his death. A more predominant theory, however, is one proposed by Charles Knight in 1838: the play was a collaboration between Shakespeare and at least one other dramatist. Today, many scholars believe that other dramatist was Thomas Middleton. However, the exact nature of the collaboration is disputed. Did Middleton revise a piece begun by Shakespeare, did Shakespeare revise Middleton's work, or did they work together? John Jowett, editor of the play for both the Oxford Shakespeare: Complete Works and the individual Oxford Shakespeare edition, believes Middleton worked with Shakespeare in an understudy capacity and wrote scenes 2 (1.2 in editions which divide the play into acts), 5 (3.1), 6 (3.2), 7 (3.3), 8 (3.4), 9 (3.5), 10 (3.6) and the last eighty lines of 14 (4.3).
Evidence: because there is no reference to Timon until 1623, attempts to date the play must rely on topical allusions and stylistic analysis. A possible terminus ante quem is 1608. In his 2004 edition for the Oxford Shakespeare, John Jowett argues the lack of act divisions in the Folio text is an important factor in determining a date. The King's Men only began to use act divisions in their scripts when they occupied the indoor Blackfriars Theatre in August 1608 as their winter playhouse. Timon is notoriously difficult to divide into acts, suggesting to Jowett that it was written at a time when act divisions were of no concern to the writer, hence it must have been written prior to August 1608. A terminus post quem may come from a possible topical allusion to the Gunpowder Plot of November 1605; "those that under hot ardent zeal would set whole realms on fire" (Sc.7.32–33). In the context of the play, the line is referring to religious zeal, but some scholars feel it is a subtle reference to the events of November. The play may also have been influenced by a pamphlet published in June 1605, Two Unnatural and Bloody Murders, which served as the primary source for Thomas Middleton's A Yorkshire Tragedy. This would narrow the possible range of dates to sometime between November 1605 and August 1608. Narrowing the date further, however, must come wholly from stylistic analysis. A metrical test links the play most closely with Hamlet, Troilus and Cressida and King Lear, whilst a colloquialism-in-verse test places it after All's Well but before Macbeth. Furthermore, MacDonald P. Jackson's rare word test found the conjectured Shakespearean parts of the text date to 1605–1606. However, if one were to analyse the conjectured non-Shakespearean sections as if they were by Shakespeare, the rare word test produces a date of 1594–1595, an obvious impossibility. Going further, Jackson found that if one examines the non-Shakespearean sections in the context of Middleton's career, a date of 1605–1606 also results.

=== Macbeth (1606) ===
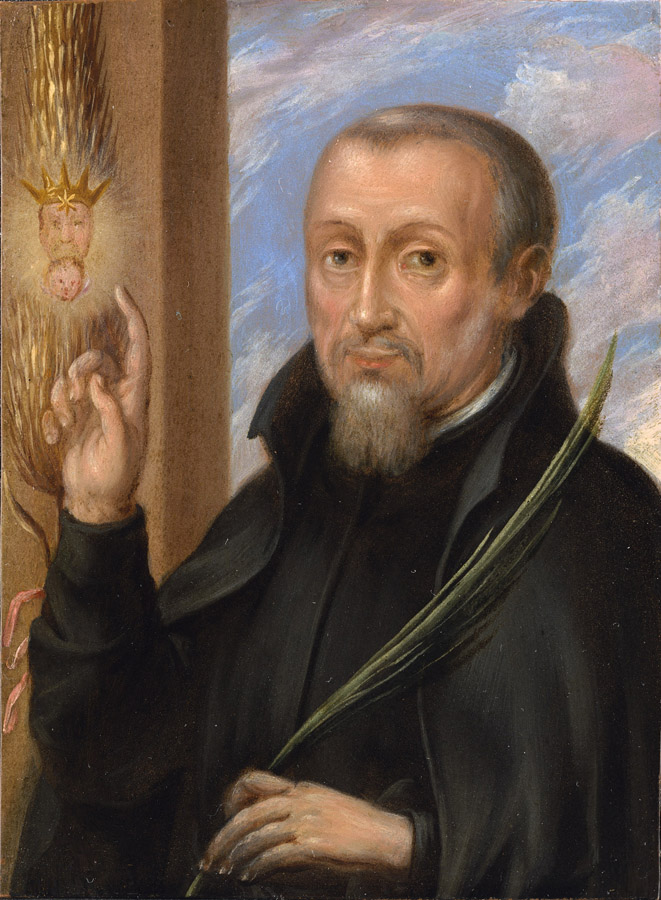
Henry Garnet, executed for his involvement in the Gunpowder Plot, and possibly referred to by the Porter in Macbeth.

First official record: in his notes for a book on "Common Policy" (i.e. public morals), Simon Forman records seeing the play at the Globe on 20 April 1611. He actually dates the performance "1610, the 20th April, Saturday," but in 1610, 20 April was a Tuesday, and most scholars feel he accidentally wrote the wrong year.
First published: First Folio (1623), as The Tragedie of Macbeth.
First recorded performance: possibly on 20 April 1611 at the Globe, recorded by Simon Forman. However, there is some doubt amongst scholars as to the veracity of Forman's account. Initially, the document itself was thought to be a forgery, as it was first brought to light by John Payne Collier amongst a group of documents many of which did prove to be inauthentic. Although J. Dover Wilson proved the document was genuine in 1947, doubts remain as to the reliability of Forman's report. For example, he makes no mention of the apparitions, or of Hecate, and he virtually ignores the conclusion of the play, which is strange considering he was taking notes for a book about morals. He also mentions seeing Macbeth and Banquo on horseback riding through a wood, something highly unlikely on the Globe stage. Furthermore, he describes the Weïrd Sisters as "nymphs or fairies," an unusual way to describe the characters as they appear in the play. However, "nymphs" is how they are described in one of Shakespeare's sources for Macbeth, Holinshed's Chronicles. This suggests Forman may have conflated witnessing a performance with reading the source material. If Forman's account is not accepted as genuine, the first recorded performance was on 5 November 1664, as recorded by Samuel Pepys.
Additional information (revision): because it is theorised by some scholars that the Folio text of Macbeth shows signs of revision, dating the play can be difficult. Macbeth is extremely short for a Shakespearean tragedy, and it is thought that F1 may have been set from a prompt book that had been shortened for performance, rather than from Shakespeare's own foul papers. First suggested by W. G. Clarke and W. A. Wright in their 1869 edition of the play for Clarendon Press, the most likely person to have carried out the revision is Thomas Middleton. The play is listed in the Oxford Shakespeare: Complete Works as "The Tragedy of Macbeth by William Shakespeare, Adapted by Thomas Middleton," and its date is recorded as "1606; adapted 1616." Middleton is conjectured to have written 3.5 and much of 4.1; the only scenes which feature Hecate. The nature of these scenes suggest revision as opposed to collaboration. The main reason Middleton's name is attached to the conjectured revision is because 4.1 calls for the use of two songs from The Witch, a play by Middleton himself. However, Middleton's involvement with the play, and the notion of revision work itself, is not universally accepted. Two notable scholars who dissent from this theory are Jonathan Hope and Brian Vickers.
Evidence: the play is closely connected to King James, and scholars are in general agreement that it is unlikely to have been written prior to his accession in 1603. He considered Banquo his direct ancestor, and eight Stuart kings preceded James, just as Banquo is depicted at the end of "a show of eight kings" (4.1.126.1–2). In 1790, Edmond Malone dated the play 1606, and the majority of scholars still accept this date even whilst acknowledging little conclusive evidence exists, other than the fact that it 'seems' correct in the context of Shakespeare's other work of the period. There are some possible topical allusions, however, which do support a date of 1606. For example, the Porter's mention of "an equivocator that could swear in both the scales against either scale" (2.3.7–9) is a possible reference to the Gunpowder plot, specifically the trial of Henry Garnet in March 1606. Furthermore, the Weïrd Sisters' account of The Tiger (1.3.8–26) is thought to allude to a ship of the same name that returned to England on 27 June 1606 after a disastrous voyage in which many of the crew were killed by pirates. At 1.3.22–23, the First Witch says "Weary sev'n-nights, nine times nine,/Shall he dwindle, peak, and pine." The real ship was at sea 567 days, the product of 7x9x9, which has been taken as a confirmation of the allusion. If this theory is correct, the play could not have been written any earlier than July 1606. In his 1997 edition of the play for the New Cambridge Shakespeare, however, A. R. Braunmuller finds the arguments for topical allusions inconclusive and instead argues for a date closer to James's accession in 1603. From a stylistic perspective, a metrical test and colloquialism-in-verse test place the play after Lear and Timon but before Antony and Cleopatra, although Ants Oras's pause test places it before all three plays. A rare word test places it closest to Troilus and Lear.

=== Antony and Cleopatra (1606) ===
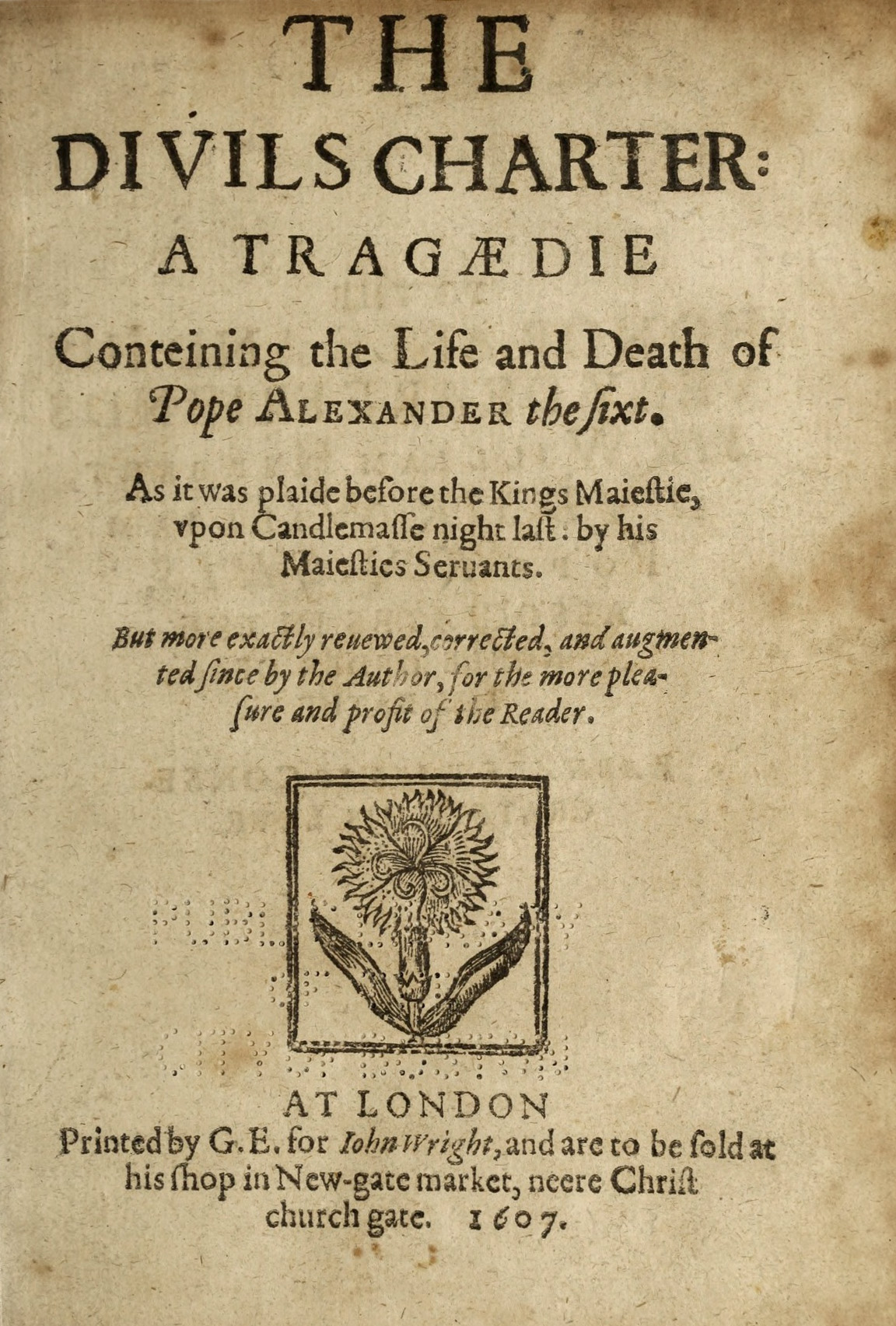
1607 quarto of The Devil's Charter, which may allude to Antony and Cleopatra.

First official record: entered into the Stationers' Register by Edward Blount on 20 May 1608 as "a booke Called Anthony. and Cleopatra." Jointly entered with Pericles, Prince of Tyre.
First published: First Folio (1623), as The Tragedie of Anthonie, and Cleopatra.
First recorded performance: in 1669 the Lord Chamberlain's office granted the right to perform the play to Thomas Killigrew, with the added note that it had been "formerly acted at the Blackfriars," but no further information is given. The earliest definite performance was in 1759 when it was staged by David Garrick at Drury Lane, from a script prepared by Edward Capell. However, this production was heavily influenced by John Dryden's All for Love, which, along with Charles Sedley's Antony and Cleopatra had dominated the stage from 1677 onwards. Different adaptations were staged by John Philip Kemble at Covent Garden in 1813, William Macready at Drury Lane in 1833, Samuel Phelps at Sadler's Wells in 1849, Andrew Halliday at Drury Lane in 1873, and Herbert Beerbohm Tree at His Majesty's Theatre in 1906. The earliest known production of the straight Shakespearean text was in a production by Robert Atkins at The Old Vic in 1922.
Evidence: obviously, the play was written by May 1608. However, an earlier terminus ante quem can perhaps be established by Samuel Daniel's republication of his play The Tragedie of Cleopatra (originally written in 1594) in a "newly altered version," which seems to have been influenced by Shakespeare's Anthony and Cleopatra. For example, Daniel includes a newly added allusion to "Cydnus" as the meeting place of the lovers, adds the characters of Dircetus, Diomedes and Gallus, and includes several verbal echoes. If the play was an influence on Daniel then it must have been on stage by Easter 1607, due to the closing of the theatres because of plague. This suggests it was written in 1606 or very early 1607. That 1606 is the most likely date seems fixed by Barnabe Barnes's The Devil's Charter, acted by the King's Men on 2 February 1607. Barnes refers to "aspics," which are used to kill two young princes in their sleep, as "Cleopatra's birds," and the princes as "competitors with Cleopatra." If Barnes is here alluding to Anthony and Cleopatra, in which Cleopatra kills herself by making an asp bite her on the breast and arm (5.2.302–312), it must have been on stage by January 1607 at the very latest, suggesting composition in 1606.

=== Pericles, Prince of Tyre (1607–1608) ===
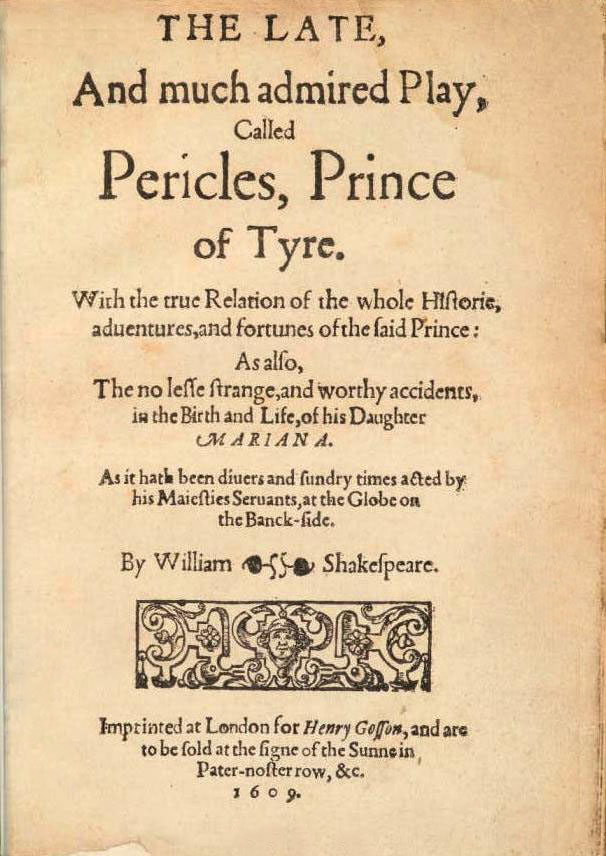
1609 quarto of Pericles

First official record: entered into the Stationers' Register by Edward Blount on 20 May 1608 as "A booke called. The booke of Pericles prynce of Tyre." Jointly entered with Antony and Cleopatra.
First published: published in quarto in 1609 as The Late and much admired Play, Called Pericles, Prince of Tyre. With the true Relation of the whole History, adventures, and fortunes of the sayd Prince: As also, The no lesse strange, and worthy accidents, in the Birth and Life, of his Daughter Mariana (printed by William White and Thomas Creede for Henry Gosson). This text was republished in 1609 (again by White and Creede for Gosson), 1611 (by Simon Stafford for Gosson) 1619 (as part of William Jaggard's "False Folio", printed by Thomas Pavier), 1630 (by John Norton for Robert Bird) and 1635 (by Thomas Cotes for Robert Bird). Pericles did not appear in the First Folio (1623), the Second Folio (1632) or the first impression of the Third Folio (1663). It was added to the second impression of the Third Folio (1664; printed by Coates for Philip Chetwinde) as The much admired Play, called, Pericles, Prince of Tyre. With the true Relation of the whole History, Adventures, and Fortunes of the sayd Prince.
First recorded performance: the Venetian ambassador to England from 5 January 1606 to 23 November 1608, Zorzi Giustinian, saw a production of the play during his time in London. He was accompanied by the French ambassador, Antoine Lefèvre de la Boderie, and his wife, who arrived in England in April 1607. Giustinian noted that he paid admission, so the play must have been public. As the theatres were closed from April to December 1607 and from July to November 1608, he must have seen the play sometime between January and June 1608. The earliest known datable production was at the manor house of Sir John Yorke, Gouthwaite Hall in North Yorkshire, on 2 February 1610, performed by the Cholmley Players. Information concerning the production comes from a case in the Court of Star Chamber taken against the Catholic Yorke by his Puritan neighbour Sir Stephen Proctor.
Additional information (attribution): as the play was not included in the First Folio, there has always been doubt as to whether or not Shakespeare actually wrote it. The second impression of the Third Folio added seven new plays, six of which have been proven to be part of the Shakespeare Apocrypha; Locrine, The London Prodigal, The Puritan, Sir John Oldcastle, Thomas Lord Cromwell, and A Yorkshire Tragedy. Traditionally, for some scholars, the simple fact that Pericles is included with such a group is proof enough that Shakespeare did not write it. In a contested field, the most widely accepted theory is that Shakespeare collaborated on the play with another playwright, probably George Wilkins. Although the collaboration theory dates back to at least 1709 (Nicholas Rowe's The Works of Mr. William Shakespeare), the theory of Wilkins's involvement originated in 1868, suggested by Nicolaus Delius. Wilkins status as co-author is generally accepted by modern scholars, and Delius's original breakdown of scenes remains the most widely agreed upon; Wilkins worked on scenes 1–9 and Shakespeare on scenes 10–22. However, because the 1609 quarto is so badly corrupted and generally regarded as a poorly constructed memorial reconstruction, there is no complete agreement as to the motives or mechanism of the collaboration, with some scholars arguing for Shakespeare as sole author. For example, in their 1998 edition of the play for the New Cambridge Shakespeare, Doreen Delvecchio and Anthony Hammond reject the theory of co-authorship, arguing that the problems inherent in the text arise not because of collaborative writing, but because of especially poor memorial reconstruction. On the other hand, in his 2002 book Shakespeare, Co-Author, Brian Vickers is highly critical of Delvecchio and Hammond's analysis, arguing that co-authorship of the play is a virtual certainty. Similarly, in the 2003 book, Defining Shakespeare, MacDonald P. Jackson analyses, amongst other aspects, versification, rhyme, function words, pronoun usage, metrical patterns and elisions. He too is especially critical of Delvecchio and Hammond, and he too concludes that Wilkins's status as co-author is virtually certain.
Evidence: in 1608, Wilkins published a prose version of the story called The Painful Adventures of Pericles Prince of Tyre, Being the True History of the Play of Pericles, as it was lately presented by the worthy and ancient poet John Gower, which contains numerous phrases that seem to recall specific lines from the play, suggesting work on the play preceded composition of the prose version. In fact, some scholars consider Wilkins's prose version to be a more accurate record of the original script than the 1609 quarto, and several modern editors have incorporated passages from Wilkins's prose into the play text, such as Roger Warren's 2003 edition for the Oxford Shakespeare, based on a text prepared by Gary Taylor and MacDonald P. Jackson, or the version in the 2nd edition of the Oxford Shakespeare: Complete Works (2005), edited by Taylor. Stylistic analysis places the play in the period of 1607–1608. A rare word test of scenes 10–22 place them closest to The Tempest, whereas a rare word test of scenes 1–9 place them closest to 1 Henry IV. If Shakespeare wrote 10–22, the proximity to The Tempest makes sense. If Wilkins wrote 1–9, Gary Taylor has suggested that due to the immense popularity of 1 Henry IV, Wilkins may have read it during composition in an effort to write in a Shakespearean manner. Ants Oras's pause test places scenes 10–22 closest to Macbeth and Antony and Cleopatra. Taken together, the stylistic evidence, the 1608 Stationers' Register entry, Wilkins's 1608 prose version, the 1608 performance seen by Giustinian, and the 1609 quarto, all serve to suggest a date of composition of 1607 or very early 1608.

=== Coriolanus (1608) ===
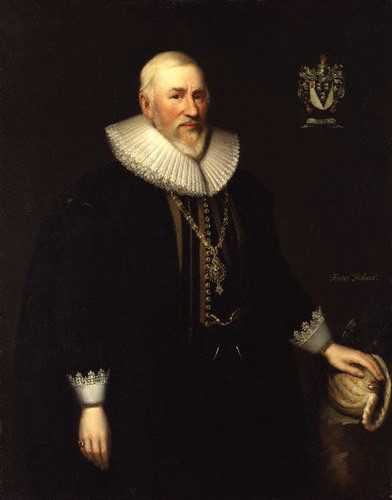
Sir Hugh Myddelton by Cornelis Janssens van Ceulen (1628). The play contains a possible allusion to Myddleton's 1608 scheme to bring clean water to London.

First official record: mentioned in the Stationers' Register entry for the First Folio, on 8 November 1623.
First published: First Folio (1623), as The Tragedy of Coriolanus.
First recorded performance: the earliest known production of the play was a 1681 adaptation by Nahum Tate performed at Drury Lane. Called The Ingratitude of a Commonwealth; or, The Fall of Coriolanus, the play was specifically written to protest the anti-Catholic riots which arose in response to the "Popish Plot" to assassinate Charles II. In 1719, John Dennis adapted the play, again into a political protest piece staged at Drury Lane. The Invader of His Country; or, The Fatal Resentment was written in response to the Jacobite rising of 1715. More adaptations followed; James Thomson's 1747 version Coriolanus: A Tragedy was performed at Covent Garden in protest against the Jacobite rising of 1745, and Thomas Sheridan's Coriolanus: The Roman Matron, which combined Shakespeare's original with Thomson's version and was performed at Smock Alley in Dublin in 1752. The earliest known production of the straight Shakespearean text was on 11 November 1754, when David Garrick staged an abridged production at Drury Lane.
Evidence: the play must have been written between 1605 and 1609. A terminus post quem of 1605 is fixed by Menenius's speech regarding the body politic (1.1.93–152), which is partly derived from a speech attributed to Pope Adrian IV in William Camden's Remaines of a Greater Worke, Concerning Britaine, which was published in 1605. A terminus ante quem of 1609 can be fixed by Ben Jonson's Epicœne, or The silent woman, which mocks the line "he lurched all swords of the garland" (2.2.99), and Robert Armin's Phantasma the Italian Tailor and his Boy, which contains a close parallel to the line "they threw their caps/As they would hang them on the horns o'th'moon" (1.1.209–210). Epicœne was written in 1609, and Phantasma was entered into the Stationers Register on 6 February 1609. Topical allusions, however, can be used to narrow the date further. For example, the presentation of the grain riots is strikingly reminiscent of the Midlands corn riots of 1607. Perhaps significantly, Shakespeare was in Stratford-upon-Avon for much of autumn 1608, organising his mother's funeral and conducting business, and thus would have been close to the origin point of the unrest. The reference to "the coal of fire upon the ice" (1.1.170) is a possible allusion to the winter of 1607–08, when the frost was so severe that vendors set up booths on the frozen Thames river, and pans of coals were placed on the ice so that pedestrians could warm themselves. Also, an allusion to the complaints about Hugh Myddelton's project to bring clean water to London from the River Lea (which originated in 1608) has been detected in Martius's warning to the patricians "to say he'll turn your current in a ditch/And make your channel his" (3.1.98–9). Gary Taylor also finds the use of act divisions in the Folio text important, as the King's Men only began to use act divisions when they occupied the indoors Blackfriars Theatre in August 1608. Lee Bliss argues that the five-act structure is built into the thematic fabric of the play, further strengthening the argument that it was written for Blackfriars. Indeed, Bliss believes Coriolanus may have been the King's Men's debut play at the theatre. Taylor believes that the cumulative internal evidence all points to a composition date of no earlier than spring 1608. In his 1994 edition of the play for the Oxford Shakespeare, R. B. Parker dates the play to mid-1608. In his 2000 edition for the New Cambridge Shakespeare, Lee Bliss is unconvinced by the arguments that Shakespeare is referring to the freezing of the Thames or to Myddelton's scheme, and settles on a date of late 1608 to early 1609.

=== The Winter's Tale (1609–1611) ===
First official record: in his journal, Simon Forman recorded seeing a performance of the play at the Globe on 15 May 1611.
First published: First Folio (1623).
First recorded performance: a production of the play by the King's Men was staged at the Globe on 15 May 1611, as recorded by Simon Forman.
Evidence: The Winter's Tale can be a difficult play to date precisely due to a lack of contemporary references and topical allusions. Aside from the Forman reference (and some subsequent dated productions at court), and a possible allusion to a Ben Jonson piece, the play must be dated using stylistic analysis. The possible Jonson reference occurs during the sheep-shearing feast, when twelve countrymen perform a satyrs' dance that three are said to have already "danced before the King" (4.4.333). This may be an allusion to Ben Jonson's masque Oberon, the Faery Prince, which was performed at court on 1 January 1611. This would place the most likely date of composition sometime in mid-1610. However, not all scholars believe the reference need be taken that literally, and even those that do accept the Jonson allusion, such as Stanley Wells (editor of the play for the Oxford Shakespeare: Complete Works), agree that the passage may have been added at a later date, and is therefore of little use in dating the play. Traditionally, the play is paired with Cymbeline in terms of style, theme and tone, with The Winter's Tale seen as the superior play, and therefore the later of the two. However, stylistic analysis would suggest Winter's Tale preceded Cymbeline; a rare word test places it closest to Measure for Measure, Ants Oras pause test places it closest to Pericles, a colloquialism-in-verse test places it after Coriolanus but before Cymbeline, a metrical test places it closest to Antony and Cleopatra. In his 2010 edition of the play for the third series of the Arden Shakespeare, John Pitcher argues for a date of late 1610 – early 1611, believing Shakespeare wrote Winter's Tale, Cymbeline and The Tempest in this period after the reopening of the theatres in early 1611, although he acknowledges this creates a gap in the chronology which would suggest Shakespeare wrote nothing in 1609.

=== Cymbeline (1610) ===
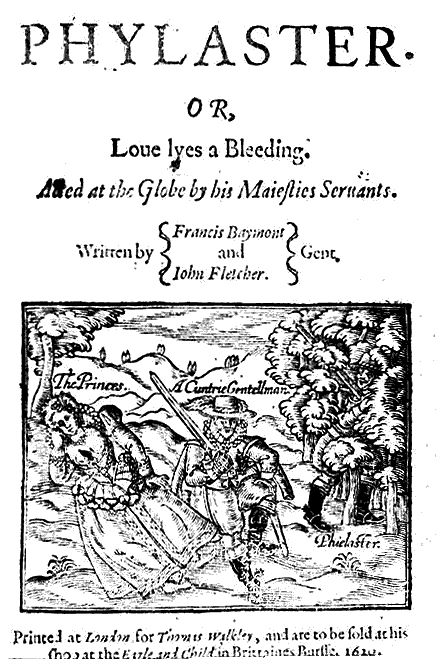
1620 quarto of Francis Beaumont and John Fletcher's Philaster, which has strong links with Cymbeline.

First official record: Simon Forman saw a production on an unspecified date in 1611. It is thought he saw the play not long before he died, on 8 September of that year.
First published: First Folio (1623), as The Tragedie of Cymbeline.
First recorded performance: Simon Forman saw the play in 1611, although the date (and location) is unknown. The earliest known datable performance was on 1 January 1634, when the play was performed at court for Charles I and Henrietta Maria, where it was described as "well likte by the kinge."
Evidence: obviously, the play was complete by September 1611. A terminus post quem of 1608 can be fixed with reasonable certainty insofar as the spectacular stage direction in 5.3, when "Jupiter descends in thunder and lightning, sitting upon an eagle," suggests Shakespeare wrote the play with the indoor stage equipment of Blackfriars in mind, which places the date as after August 1608. The play also has connections with two other plays of the period; Francis Beaumont and John Fletcher's Philaster, or Love Lies a-Bleeding and Thomas Heywood's The Golden Age. Philaster and Cymbeline have strong verbal and tonal parallels, and both feature a broadly similar plot. Scholars are in general agreement that the plays were written around the same period, and that one influenced the other. The direction of influence, however, is not certain. If Beaumont and Fletcher were influenced by Cymbeline, they must have seen it in performance. But the theatres were closed until at least December 1609, meaning the play could not have been staged until early 1610. Philaster was read in MS by John Davies in October 1610, so if Philaster was influenced by Cymbeline, it must have been written in the first half of 1610. But this contradicts Andrew Gurr's evidence that Philaster was written in late 1609. On the other hand, Shakespeare would have had access to the Philaster MS, making it more likely that Philaster preceded Cymbeline. If Gurr's late 1609 date for Philaster is correct, this would suggest Shakespeare wrote Cymbeline in 1610. The play is also connected to Thomas Heywood's The Golden Age, which, like Cymbeline, features Jupiter descending on a cloud, as well as some tentative verbal parallels. As Heywood commonly borrowed from Shakespeare's work, the likely explanation here is that Cymbeline preceded Golden Age. But the date of Golden Age is uncertain. It was published in 1611, but there is some evidence it may have been written in late 1610. If one accepts this date, it suggests a date of mid-1610 for Cymbeline. Further evidence for 1610 is presented by Roger Warren, in his 1998 edition of the play for the Oxford Shakespeare. Warren argues that the play was performed at court during the investiture of James's eldest son Henry as Prince of Wales, which ran from 31 May to 6 June. Central to the celebrations was Samuel Daniels's Tethys' Festival, which foregrounded Milford Haven as the "port of union" where Henry's ancestor Henry Tudor had landed to face Richard III. Milford is similarly foregrounded in Cymbeline, which also deals with the iconography and cultural significance of Welshness, providing a correlation between the geography of the play and the politics of the period. In his 2005 edition for the New Cambridge Shakespeare, Martin Butler, citing much of the same evidence as Warren (although he is unconvinced by the connection with Golden Age), agrees with a date of mid-1610.

=== The Tempest (1610–1611) ===
First official record: an entry in the Revels Account Book records a performance on 1 November 1611.
First published: First Folio (1623).
First recorded performance: in the banqueting hall at Whitehall Palace on 1 November 1611, performed by the King's Men.
Evidence: the date of The Tempest can be securely fixed between September 1610 and October 1611. Obviously, to have been on stage on 1 November, it must have been completed before November, and it is unlikely that the Whitehall performance was the first performance (plays were rarely performed at court without previously appearing on the public stage). The terminus post quem of September 1610 can be fixed by Shakespeare's use of a real incident as source material. In May 1609 a fleet of nine ships set sail from Plymouth, heading for Virginia, carrying five hundred colonists. On 29 July, the flagship, the Sea Venture, was driven off course by a storm and wrecked on the coast of Bermuda. All hands were thought lost, but on 23 May 1610 her passengers arrived safely in Virginia, having found shelter on Bermuda, where they repaired the pinnaces and completed their journey. The play is particularly indebted to William Strachey's A True Reportory of the Wracke and Redemption of Sir Thomas Gates, written in Virginia, and dated 15 July. The MS was carried back to England by Gates himself, who arrived in London in early September. Although True Reportory was not published until 1625, it is known to have been read widely in MS form. Two pamphlets published later in 1610 were also used as sources; Sylvester Jourdain's A Discovery of the Bermudas, the dedication of which is dated 13 October 1610, and the Virginia Company's own A True Declaration of the Estate of the Colonie in Virginia, which was entered into the Stationers Register on 8 November. It is worth noting that although most scholars accept these texts as sources and evidence of dating, not all do so. Kenneth Muir is a notable example of a scholar who questions the argument that Shakespeare used Strachey. Stylistically, a rare vocabulary test, a colloquialism-in-verse test and Ants Oras's pause test all place the play after Coriolanus, Winter's Tale and Cymbeline.

=== Cardenio (1612–1613) ===
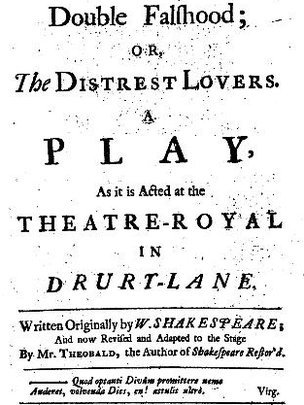
1728 quarto of Double Falshood

First official record: entered into the Stationers' Register by Humphrey Moseley on 9 September 1653, as "The History of Cardenio, by Mr Fletcher and Shakespeare."
First published: as far as is known, Cardenio itself has never been published, but in 1728 Lewis Theobald published a play called Double Falshood; or, The Distrest Lovers, which he claimed was adapted from Shakespeare's Cardenio. Theobald claimed that he had access to the original play in the form of three manuscripts. The play had been staged at Drury Lane in December 1727, to great box office success, and was revived in 1728. According to an article in the Gazetteer on 31 March 1770, "the original Manuscript of this play is now treasured up in the Museum of Covent Garden Playhouse." However, the article is unclear on whether it is referring to the original Cardenio manuscript by Shakespeare and Fletcher or the original Double Falsehood script by Theobald. In any case, the library burned down in 1808. Theobald's 1728 publication contains a preface which reads, in part, "It has been alleged as incredible, that such a curiosity should be stifled and lost to the world for above a century. To this my answer is short: that though it never till now made its appearance on the stage, yet one of the manuscript copies which I have is of above sixty years standing, in the handwriting of Mr. Downes the famous old prompter; and, as I am credibly informed, was early in the possession of the celebrated Mr. Betterton and by him designed to have been ushered into the world. What accident prevented this purpose of his, I do not pretend to know; or through what hands it had successively passed before that period of time. There is a tradition (which I have from the noble person, who supplied me with one of my copies) that it was given by our author, as a present of value, to a natural daughter of his, for whose sake he wrote it, in the time of his retirement from the stage. Two other copies I have (one of which I was glad to purchase at a very good rate), which may not, perhaps, be quite so old as the former; but one of them is much more perfect, and has fewer flaws and interruptions in the sense."
First recorded performance: on 20 May 1613, the King's Company received payment for a court performance of "Cardenno." The precise date of this court performance is not known, but it is most likely to have occurred between 9–21 February 1613.
Additional information (attribution): Cardenio is considered a lost play, and whether or not Shakespeare had anything to do with it is an unanswered (and, given the available evidence, perhaps unanswerable) question. Only two sources attribute it to Shakespeare; Moseley's 1653 Stationers' Register entry and Theobald's 1727 adaptation. Although the 1613 court payment does connect the play to the King's Men, this does not mean Shakespeare wrote it, as the company performed many plays in which he had no hand. The validity of Moseley's attribution is not helped by the fact that he is known to have attributed several other now lost plays to Shakespeare. For example, on 29 June 1660, he made an entry in the Register for "the History of King Stephen. Duke Humphrey, a Tragedy. Iphis and Iantha, or a marriage without a man, a Comedy. By Will: Shakespeare." However, Gary Taylor argues that it is unlikely Moseley was aware of the 1613 court payments to the King's Men, which coincides with Shakespeare's collaboration with Fletcher on two other plays (Henry VIII and The Two Noble Kinsmen). Taylor believes this adds support to Moseley's claim of Shakespearean authorship, especially as Fletcher's involvement in Henry VIII hadn't been established by 1653. Scholars also continue to debate the validity of Theobald's claims that he was in possession of a Shakespearean play that had been omitted from all previous editions of Shakespeare's work. E. K. Chambers points out several problems with Theobald's asserted ownership of the text; no one else ever confirmed seeing the three manuscripts, Theobald's claim that he owned them is the only evidence we have; there is no evidence Shakespeare had a "natural daughter" (i.e. an illegitimate daughter), he had two legitimate daughters, and one son, who died age eleven (although John Freehafer argues the reference to "a natural daughter" is to Henrietta Maria du Tremblay, the wife of Shakespeare's (alleged) illegitimate son, William Davenant); the manuscripts apparently disappeared after Theobald's death and were not listed in his sale catalogue of 23 October 1744; the play is never mentioned in the writings of either Downes or Betterton; and if Theobald was so certain of Shakespeare's authorship, why did he not include the play in his 1734 edition of the complete works? Scholars remain divided on the issue of Theobald's claims. However, in 2010, Double Falsehood was controversially published under the Arden Shakespeare banner, edited by Brian Hammond, who adopts the position set out by G. Harold Metz in his 1989 book, Sources of Four Plays Ascribed to Shakespeare; "Double Falsehood is mainly Theobald, or Theobald with an earlier adapter, with a substantial admixture of Fletcher and a modicum of Shakespeare." Hammond, for the most part, accepts Theobald's claims, although not without some reservations, and believes that Double Falsehood was adapted from Cardenio, a play written by Shakespeare and Fletcher.
Evidence: the dating of the play is based on the fact that Cardenio is a character in Don Quixote, which was not published in English until Thomas Shelton's 1612 translation.

=== Henry VIII (1612–1613) ===
First official record: a letter by Thomas Lorkin, dated 30 June 1613, in which he describes a fire at the Globe Theatre caused when sparks from an on-stage cannon landed on a thatched roof during a performance of "the play of Hen:8."
First published: First Folio (1623), as The Famous History of the Life of King Henry the Eight.
First recorded performance: the production mentioned in Lorkin's letter took place on 29 June 1613. In a letter by Sir Henry Wotton to Sir Edmund Bacon, dated 2 July 1613, Wotton describes the production as "a new play called All Is True representing some principal pieces of the reign of Henry the VIIIth." Traditionally, this was assumed to have been the first performance. However, in another letter describing the fire, written by London merchant Henry Bluett on 4 July 1613, and only discovered in 1981, the play is described as having "been acted not passing 2 or 3 times before," meaning although 29 June is the first recorded performance, it was not the first actual performance of the play.
Additional information (attribution): the play is thought to be a collaboration with John Fletcher, a theory first proposed in 1850 by James Spedding (following a suggestion by Alfred, Lord Tennyson), who suggested that Shakespeare's original manuscript was touched up by Fletcher and his regular collaborator, Francis Beaumont. Unlike Shakespeare's other collaboration(s) with Fletcher (Two Noble Kinsmen and, possibly, Cardenio), there is no external evidence that Fletcher worked on Henry VIII, and any arguments for collaboration are based wholly on stylistic analysis. However, much of this evidence does suggest two writers; a rare word test, Ants Oras's pause test, the relationship between prose and verse, vocabulary distribution, and a colloquialism-in-verse test all provide evidence that the play had two different authors. The passages most confidently attributed to Shakespeare are 1.1, 1.2, 2.3, 2.4, 3.2 and 5.1.
Evidence: the fact that the 29 June performance was such an early performance suggests a date of composition of 1612–1613, a date with which most modern scholars concur. Ever since Spedding, scholars have tended to link the play with the marriage of Princess Elizabeth to Frederick V, Elector Palatine, in February 1613. In his 1957 edition of the play for the second series of the Arden Shakespeare, R. A. Foakes argues the overriding theme of the play, especially the final scene, showing the christening of the future Queen Elizabeth, would have perfectly suited the political atmosphere of the period. In early 1613, there was much suspicion of Spain, and Catholic conspiracy, and it was hoped that the marriage would produce an alliance with the devoutly Protestant German princes. In terms of stylistic analysis, the most significant data in terms of dating the play is MacDonald P. Jackson's rare word test, which found that the sections of the play thought to be by Shakespeare must be dated to the very end of his career, and if the non-Shakespearean sections were treated as Shakespearean they would be dated to 1599–1600, an obvious impossibility.

=== The Two Noble Kinsmen (1613–1614) ===
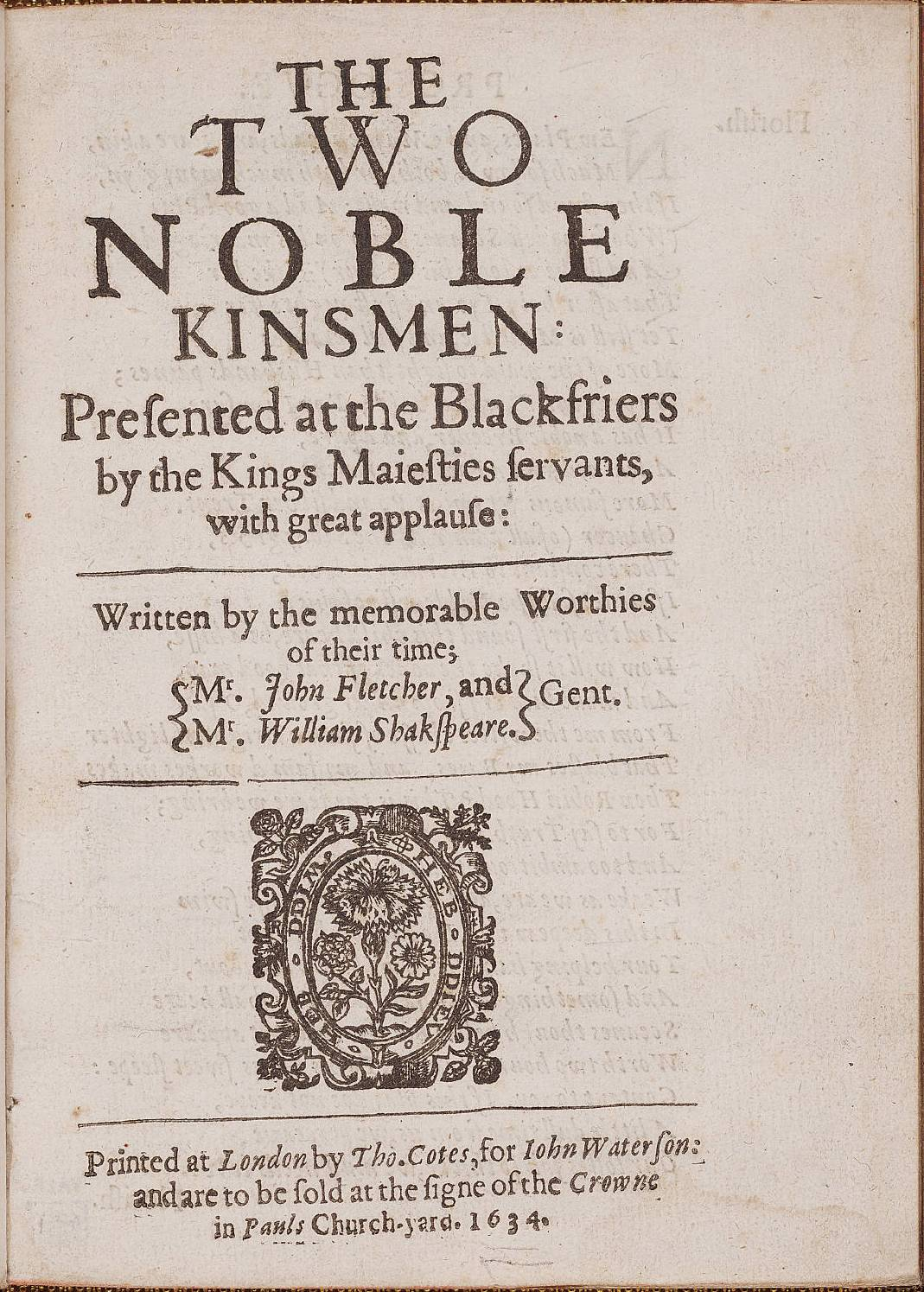
1634 quarto of The Two Noble Kinsmen

First official record: a fragment from the King's Office of the Revels, dated 1619, includes a list of plays which may have been recently performed at court. Two Noble Kinsmen is one of the plays mentioned.
First published: published in quarto in 1634 (printed by Thomas Cotes for John Waterson).
First recorded performance: although the play must have been staged prior to October 1614, records of early productions are vague. The 1619 list may be a list of recently performed plays, but it could also be a list of plays proposed for future performance. The inclusion of two actors' names in stage directions in the 1634 quarto text (4.2.70.1 and 5.3.0.2) suggest the play was staged in 1625 or 1626 (the actors mentioned are "Curtis" (probably Curtis Greville) and "T. Tucke", (Thomas Tuckfield), both of whom were with the King's Men for the 1625–1626 season only). The quarto text also claims the play had recently been performed at Blackfriars. However, the earliest known performance is in the form of William Davenant's adaptation The Rivals in 1664. The earliest known production of the straight Shakespearean/Fletcher text was in The Old Vic on 28 March 1928, directed by Andrew Leigh.
Additional information (attribution): attributed to Shakespeare and Fletcher by both the Stationers' Register entry and the 1634 quarto, there is also much internal evidence that the play was a collaboration between the two. Studies of vocabulary, metre, imagery, pause patterns, the treatment of sources as well as linguistic analysis and rare word tests all suggest the play had two distinct authors. Shakespeare is thought to have written Act 1, 2.1, 3.1, 3.2, and most of Act 5 (except 5.4).
Evidence: the morris dance in 3.5 borrows from Francis Beaumont's The Masque of the Inner Temple and Gray's Inn, which was performed at court on 20 February 1613, probably by the King's Men. A terminus ante quem is fixed by Ben Jonson's Bartholomew Fair, first performed on 31 October 1614, which twice sarcastically refers to "Palemon"; Palamon is one of the protagonists in Noble Kinsmen. This establishes a date of composition sometime between February 1613 and October 1614. The argument has also been made that the play may have been commissioned specifically for the festivities surrounding the marriage of Princess Elizabeth to Frederick V, Elector Palatine, in February 1613. At the time, the country was still in mourning for Prince Henry, who had died in November 1612. Henry was devoutly Protestant, a keen proponent of chivalry and was delighted with Elizabeth's choice of husband. Until his death, he was the main planner behind the wedding celebrations and it has been speculated that perhaps Beaumont's The Masque of the Inner Temple was written to cater to Henry's penchant for chivalry. Geoffrey Chaucer's "The Knight's Tale", upon which Two Noble Kinsmen is based, is a chivalric romance, and would have been especially fitting for a wedding organised by Henry.

== See also ==
- Locations of Shakespeare's plays
