= Adelaide Festival =

Cultural event in Australia

Coordinates: 34.911625°S 138.635101°E

Adelaide Festival of Arts
- Begins: March
- Frequency: Annual
- Locations: Adelaide, South Australia
- Inaugurated: March 1960
- Most recent: 2022
- Previous event: 2021
- Next event: 2023
- Attendance: 227,404 (2022)
- Website: adelaidefestival.com.au

The Adelaide Festival of Arts, also known as the Adelaide Festival, an arts festival, takes place in the South Australian capital of Adelaide in March each year. Started in 1960, it is a major celebration of the arts and a significant cultural event in Australia. Matthew Lutton is artistic director for the festivals from 2026 until 2028.

The festival is based chiefly in the city centre and its parklands, with some venues in the inner suburbs (such as the Odeon Theatre, Norwood) or occasionally further afield. The Adelaide Festival Centre and River Torrens usually form the nucleus of the event, and in the 21st century Elder Park has played host to opening ceremonies.

It comprises many events, usually including opera, theatre, dance, classical and contemporary music, cabaret, literature, visual art and new media. The four-day world-music event, WOMADelaide, and the literary festival, Adelaide Writers' Week, form part of the Festival. The festival originally operated biennially, along with the (initially unofficial) Adelaide Fringe; the Fringe has taken place annually since 2007, with the Festival of Arts going annual a few years later, in 2012. With all of these events, plus the extra visitors, activities and music concerts brought by the street-circuit motor-racing event known as the Adelaide 500, locals often refer to the time of year as "Mad March".

The festival attracts interstate and overseas visitors, and generated an estimated gross expenditure of A$76.1 million for South Australia in 2018.

== History ==
The Adelaide Festival began with efforts by Sir Lloyd Dumas in the late 1950s to establish a major arts festival that would bring to South Australia world-class cultural exhibitions. In 1958, Sir Lloyd organised a gathering of prominent members of the Adelaide business, arts and government community. The proposal for an event similar to the Edinburgh International Festival was supported and the first Festival Board of Governors was formed. The event began to take form when Sir Lloyd partnered with John Bishop, Professor of Music at the University of Adelaide. The two gained the support of the Lord-Mayor and Adelaide City Council and a financial backing of 15,000 pounds. A number of leading businesses sponsored the first festival, including The Advertiser, the Bank of Adelaide, John Martin's, the Adelaide Steamship Company, and Kelvinator.

The inaugural Adelaide Festival of Arts ran from 12 to 26 March 1960 and was directed by Bishop with some assistance from Ian Hunter, the artistic director of the Edinburgh Festival. There were 105 shows covering almost all aspects of the arts. In its first year, it also spawned the Adelaide Fringe, which has grown into the largest event of its kind in the world after the Edinburgh Fringe.

The Adelaide Festival continued to grow in successive years with the support of the South Australian Government. It developed a number of incorporated events including Adelaide Writers' Week, Australia's original literary festival; WOMADelaide, the world music festival; and, the Adelaide Festival of Ideas. The Adelaide International was a curated international contemporary visual arts program held in partnership with the Samstag Museum from 2010 to 2014.

The 2002 Adelaide Festival was the most controversial festival held. Under the directorship of Peter Sellars, the festival was to focus on multiculturalism and Aboriginal culture. The festival faced significant criticism however, including for Sellars absence at the program launch, for financial difficulties, and for a TV commercial showing a likeness of Adolf Hitler superimposed onto well known artists, suggesting that if Hitler had become an artist then the Holocaust might not have happened. Sellars resigned within months of the festival opening.

After the difficulties under the directorship of Peter Sellars in the lead up to the 2002 Adelaide Festival, it was once again regarded as very strong, with its reputation intact as the pre-eminent event in the country, by 2006.

The Adelaide Festival moved from a biennial to annual event from 2012.

David Sefton was appointed as artistic director for a three-year tenure in 2013, then extended for another year. The 2013 program included for the first time, a three-night "festival within a festival": Unsound Adelaide presented international artists playing multi-dimensional electronic music.

Neil Armfield and Rachel Healy were appointed in 2015 and took over from Sefton as co-artistic directors from the 2017 festival, which included the landmark opera production of Barrie Kosky's Saul. Their contracts were extended twice, and due to finish with the 2023 festival. However, the 2021 and 2022 festivals were affected by frequently changing restrictions imposed by the government due to various waves of the COVID-19 pandemic in South Australia, which was challenging for the organisers, and also Armfield had some health issues.

In March 2022 it was announced that Ruth Mackenzie CBE would be taking over from 2023, although Armfield and Healy had already confirmed or organised most of the major events for the festival. In August 2024 it was announced that Mackenzie had been appointed Program Director, Arts, Culture and Creative Industries Policy within the Department of the Premier and Cabinet, and that former Brett Sheehy AO would take over the role as AD until a new one is appointed for the 2026 festival. In March 2025 Matthew Lutton was announced as the new festival director for a three-year term. Lutton was previously artistic director and co-CEO of the Malthouse Theatre in Melbourne for nine years.

In June 2025, it was announced that Julian Hobba was leaving the co-CEO role at the State Theatre Company of South Australia to become executive director of the Adelaide Festival from September, replacing Kath Mainland in the role. Although he considered resigning in the wake of the 2026 Writers' Week debacle, he decided to stay on, and had been assured of the festival's future independence from government.

== Governance and funding ==
In 1998 the Adelaide Festival Corporation was established as a statutory corporation by the Adelaide Festival Corporation Act 1998 (AFC Act), reporting to the Minister for the Arts. From about 1996 Arts SA (later Arts South Australia) had responsibility for this and several other statutory bodies such as the South Australian Museum and the Art Gallery of South Australia, until late 2018, when the functions were transferred to direct oversight by the Department of the Premier and Cabinet, Arts and Culture section.

There is a governing board which reports to the minister. From 2016 until 2023, the chair was Judy Potter. In 2024, marketing executive Tracey Whiting was appointed chair, followed by Potter's return after the Adelaide Writers' Week boycott led to the resignation of the entire board on 13 January 2026.

Funding is mainly from government sources, but, as a charitable body, the festival also attracts private donors within Australia and internationally. During the tenureship of Neil Armfield and Rachel Healy as co-artistic directors, donations to the festival increased from around A$55,000 a year in 2017 to A$2 million in 2022. In June 2019, it was announced that the Festival would receive A$1.25 million in annual funding over the following three years. In August 2023 the state government under Peter Malinauskas announced $2.3 million for the Adelaide Festival over three years for additional performances and events.

Artistic directors of the festival are appointed on fixed contracts for one or more years. Former artistic directors are listed below. Matthew Lutton is artistic director for the festivals from 2026 until 2028.

=== Writers' Week ===
There is a separate director of Adelaide Writers' Week; however, the Adelaide Festival board has the power to alter the schedule of Writers' Week. After the board had cancelled a scheduled appearance by Palestinian Australian writer Randa Abdel-Fattah, due to appear at the 2026 event, on 8 January 2026, hundreds of writers boycotted the festival, Writers' Week was cancelled, and all members of the AF board resigned apart a representative from Adelaide City Council (whose term expires in February). AWW director Louise Adler also resigned in protest at the board's decision.

In the afternoon of 13 January 2026, Arts Minister Andrea Michaels announced that a new board had been appointed, chaired by former chair Judy Potter.

== Past festivals ==
Neil Armfield and Rachel Healy hold the record for the most stints as director, with six festivals under their belt.

There were no directors for the festivals of 1966 and 1968, with an advisory board taking on the responsibility. Peter Sellars' brief directorship of the 2002 Adelaide Festival remains the most controversial and he was eventually replaced by Sue Nattrass AO.

Year	Director	Featured artists / performances
1960	John Bishop	A visit by the festival's patron Queen Elizabeth The Queen Mother; the inaugural Adelaide Writers' Week; T. S. Eliot's Murder in the Cathedral, Dave Brubeck's jazz quartet; the Sydney and Victorian symphony orchestras; Sir Donald Wolfit; Edwin Hodgeman; Ruth Cracknell, and poet Max Harris.
1962	John Bishop	Yehudi and Hephzibah Menuhin; the London Philharmonic Orchestra conducted by Sir Malcolm Sargent; the Bhaskar Dance Company from India; Benjamin Britten's Noye's Fludde, Zoe Caldwell in Shaw's St Joan; the Dave Brubeck Quartet and David Attenborough.
1964	John Bishop	Henry V (staged in a tent in the parklands); Marie Collier and Richard Lewis in Sir William Walton's opera Troilus and Cressida; the world premiere of Sir Robert Helpmann's ballet The Display performed by The Australian Ballet Company and designed by Sidney Nolan, and The Black Theatre of Prague.
1966	Advisory Board	The Queen Mother visited during the second week attending various events including the Flower Day celebrations and a variety show at Elder Park; The Royal Hunt of the Sun; Dame Judith Anderson performing four classical drama recitals; the Berlioz Requiem; the London Symphony Orchestra; Die Kammermusiker of Switzerland, and Yevgeny Yevtushenko at Adelaide Writers' Week.
1968	Advisory Board	Opera singers Tito Gobbi and Marie Collier; Acker Bilk and his Paramount Jazz Band; Mahler's monumental Eighth Symphony, and the Salzburg Marionette Theatre; American poet James Dickey.
1970	Sir Robert Helpmann	Benjamin Britten conducting the South Australian Symphony Orchestra; The Australian Ballet choreographed by Sir Robert Helpmann CBE and featuring Rudolf Nureyev; Royal Shakespeare's productions Winter's Tale and Twelfth Night featuring Donald Sinden and Judi Dench; the Warsaw Philharmonic Orchestra; the Bartók String Quartet (Hungary), Larry Adler and Rolf Harris. Ivor Hele's second and last solo exhibition.
1972	Louis van Eyssen	Leo McKern; Timothy West; Timothy Dalton and Frank Thring; Jesus Christ Superstar; The South Australian Theatre Company's production of The Alchemist, and American poets Lawrence Ferlinghetti and Allen Ginsberg at Adelaide Writers' Week.
1974	Anthony Steel	Recitals by André Tchaikowsky; baritone Hans Hotter; Brazilian guitarists, the Abreu Brothers; the Hungarian State Symphony Orchestra; Jacques Loussier Trio: Stratford National Theatre of Canada, and Premier Don Dunstan's reading of Ogden Nash's verses to Saint-Saëns' Carnival of the Animals.
1976	Anthony Steel	John Cage, Leo Sayer, Herbie Mann, Sonny Terry and Brownie McGhee. Adelaide Writers' Week hosted Kurt Vonnegut, Susan Sontag, James Baldwin and Wole Soyinka.
1978	Anthony Steel	Sir Michael Tippett's first opera The Midsummer Marriage; the Israel Philharmonic Orchestra under Zubin Mehta; Roger Woodward's series of Beethoven's 32 piano sonatas performed in 12 days; Compagnie Philippe Genty; Kabuki Theatre, and East by Steven Berkoff. Prominent authors at Writers' Week included Manning Clark, Barry Humphries and Frank Moorhouse, American writer Chaim Potok and Irish poet Richard Murphy.
1980	Christopher Hunt	Spike Milligan; Futuresight, an exhibition from the New York Museum of Holography; Peter Brook's Centre for International Theatre Creations; The Acting Company of New York; La Claca Theatre Company of Catalonia; the Ballet of the Komische Oper (Berlin); the Prague Chamber Ballet and the Warsaw National Philharmonic Orchestra.
1982	Jim Sharman	Opening night parade including more than 10,000 participants, followed by a concert in Elder Park with Nuova Compagnia di Canto Popolare and the Grimethorpe Colliery Band on a floating stage; Pina Bausch's Tanztheater Wuppertal, and the premiere of Patrick White's play Signal Driver.
1984	Elijah Moshinsky (resigned) / Anthony Steel	Vladimir Ashkenazy leading London's Philharmonia Orchestra performing Beethoven's nine symphonies and five piano concertos presented as a complete cycle; Theatre Tenkei Genijyo; the Pointer Sisters, and the Polish Chamber Orchestra.
1986	Anthony Steel	A high-wire walk from the Festival Theatre roof across the River Torrens; the world premiere of Richard Meale's opera Voss; Philip Glass; The Nederlands Dance Theater; Jan Fabre; The Wooster Group and Gidon Kremer.
1988	George Lascelles	Peter Brook's all-night production of The Mahabharata at The Quarry; Chicago Symphony Orchestra; Twyla Tharp Dance and Sarah Vaughan.
1990	Clifford Hocking	A landmark Australian production of Tristan and Isolde; the Vienna Singverein; Peter Schreier and Mercedes Sosa; Lyon Opera Ballet's Cinderella and French Circus Archaos.
1992	Rob Brookman	The inaugural WOMADelaide; Nixon in China; Peter Schreier and the Adelaide Symphony Orchestra's performance of Bach's St Matthew Passion; Maguy Marin's May B and Cheek by Jowl's As You Like It.
1994	Christopher Hunt	Mark Morris Dance Group; the Frankfurt Ballet; Penny Arcade; William Yang; The Four Horsemen of the Apocalypse; Hakutobo and the Wuhan Acrobats.
1996	Barrie Kosky	Late-night club Red Square, built from 120 shipping containers; the Batsheva Dance Company of Israel; Maly Theatre of St Petersburg; theatre performance La Fura dels Baus (Barcelona); Hotel Pro Forma (Denmark), DV8 Physical Theatre; Latin jazz musician Tito Puente and Annie Sprinkle.
1998	Robyn Archer	Opening night spectacular Flamma Flamma; stage adaptation of TS Eliot's The Waste Land; the Australian-Japanese production of Masterkey; Ex-Machina's seven-hour performance of The Seven Streams of the River Ota by Robert Le Page; the Andalusian opera Carmen, and Sequentia's performances of the Canticles of Ecstasy, composed by Hildegard von Bingen.
2000	Robyn Archer	Peter Greenaway's opera Writing to Vermeer; Ishina presenting Mizumachi (The Water City) in an open-air theatre; Les Ballets C de la B's tribute to Bach in his 250th year with Iets Op Bach, and 5 new Australian works commissioned for the festival.
2002	Peter Sellars (resigned) / Sue Nattrass	Kaurna Palti Meyunna in Victoria Square; a film program with titles commissioned including The Tracker, Australian Rules and Walking on Water, Uppalapu Srinivas (India), Black Swan, and many community events.
2004	Stephen Page	An indigenous Awakening Ceremony; David Gulpilil; Bangarra Dance Theatre; Windmill's RiverlanD and Body Dreaming; Bryn Terfel; the Prague Chamber Orchestra; large-scale theatrical event The Overcoat, La Carnicería Teatro (Madrid) with I Bought a Spade at Ikea to Dig My Own Grave; Circus Oz, and late night club Universal Playground.
2006	Brett Sheehy	Italian company Compagnia di Valerio Festi's Il Cielo che Danza (The Dancing Sky); Berlin's Schaubühne's Nora; the world premiere of a theatrical music event inspired by the phenomenon of Imelda Marcos, Here Lies Love; the opera Flight; highlights of the Venice Biennale, and the open air festival club Persian Garden.
2008	Brett Sheehy	The opera Ainadamar, Northern Lights, Akram Khan's Sacred Monsters with Sylvie Guillem, Leonard Cohen and Philip Glass' Buddhist-inspired Book of Longing, the Indian/Sri Lankan A Midsummer Night's Dream; the Mahavishnu Orchestra's Meeting of the Spirits and John Adams' Buddhist/Kerouac-inspired Dharma at Big Sur; an examination of the great living of composers including Pärt, Kats-Chernin, Henryk Górecki, Farr, Adams, Sculthorpe, Hosokawa, Glass, Adès, Golijov, Hindson, Westlake, MacMillan, Meale and Roumain (DBR).
2010	Paul Grabowsky	The opera production of Le Grand Macabre by György Ligeti, the Wayne Shorter Quartet; Good Morning Mr Gershwin (Montalvo-Hervieu); The Sound and the Fury (Elevator Repair Service); and The Walworth Farce (Druid); an expansion of Northern Lights; Groupe F's pyrotechnic spectacle A Little More Light, and Mahler 8 featuring the Adelaide Symphony Orchestra and the Tasmanian Symphony Orchestra.
2012	Paul Grabowsky	Raoul starring James Thiérrée; Harold Pinter's The Caretaker starring Jonathan Pryce; Leonard Bernstein's Mass featuring Jubilant Sykes; Force Majeure and Sydney Theatre Company's production Never Did Me Any Harm; Charles Bradley; Roky Erickson; Ariel Pink's Haunted Graffiti; Michael Rother and Jane Birkin.
2013	David Sefton	Kronos Quartet and Laurie Anderson; Van Dyke Parks; Sylvie Guillem; National Theatre of Scotland's The Strange Undoing of Prudencia Hart; Ontroerend Goed's Trilogy; Neil Finn and Paul Kelly; Unsound Adelaide; Severed Heads; Nick Cave and the Bad Seeds and the return of the festival club, Barrio.
2014	David Sefton	Toneelgroep Amsterdam's Roman Tragedies; John Zorn in an exclusive concert series comprising the Masada Marathon, Classical Marathon, Triple Bill and Zorn@60 with guest artists including Mike Patton, Joey Baron, Bill Laswell, Marc Ribot, Sofia Rei, Dave Lombardo, Greg Cohen, Jesse Harris and more; Batsheva Dance Company's Sadeh21; Isabella Rossellini's Green Porno; John Waters; Robert Lepage's Needles and Opium; An Iliad starring Denis O'Hare, Kid Creole and the Coconuts, Charles Bradley; Unsound Adelaide; Ilan Volkov and the festival club, Lola's Pergola.
2015	David Sefton	Spectacular digital illuminations marked the opening with Blinc. This festival also included Danny Elfman's Music from the Films of Tim Burton, unique festival shows like Tommy and the return of Unsound. New York's Cedar Lake Contemporary Ballet made their Australian debut performing works by Crystal Pite, Hofesh Shechter, Jiří Kylián and Sidi Larbi Cherkaoui.
2016	David Sefton	French maestros of light and fire Groupe F open the festival with À Fleur de Peau at the Adelaide Oval. The festival also included The James Plays by Rona Munro, Tanztheater Wuppertal Pina Bausch's Nelken, Romeo Castellucci's Go Down, Moses, Canadian dance company The Holy Body Tattoo's monumental accompanied live by Godspeed You! Black Emperor (CAN), and the award-winning 1927’s multi-disciplinary dystopian fable Golem (UK).
2017	Neil Armfield and Rachel Healy	Barrie Kosky's Helpmann Award-winning opera Saul (UK), State Theatre Company of South Australia's The Secret River (AUS), Adelaide-based circus company Gravity and Other Myths premiere of Backbone (AUS), Berlin's Schaubühne Richard III (GER), Canadian dance company Electric Company Theatre's Betroffenheit (CAN), a performance of Rufus Wainwright's Prima Donna, and Wainwright performing highlights of Rufus Does Judy (CAN).
2018	Neil Armfield and Rachel Healy	Brett Dean's opera Hamlet (UK), Grace Jones (USA), Robert Lepage's The Far Side of the Moon (CAN), The Lost and Found Orchestra (UK), jazz phenomenon Cécile McLorin Salvant (USA), dancer and choreographer Akram Khan (dancer) in his last solo as dancer in XENOS (UK), Rundfunkchor Berlin's spellbinding choral experience human requiem (GER). and Toneelgroep Amsterdam's modern take on Shakespeare's Kings of War (NL).
2019	Neil Armfield and Rachel Healy	Komische Oper Berlin's production of The Magic Flute directed by Barrie Kosky, Russia's revered Sretensky Monastery Choir, Semperoper Ballett Berlin's Carmen, choreographed by Johan Inger, ballerina Natalia Osipova starring in Meryl Tankard's Two Feet, award-winning play Counting and Cracking from Belvoir and Co-Curious (AUS).
2020	Neil Armfield and Rachel Healy	The event's 60th anniversary edition included the staging of Mozart's Requiem by Italian director Romeo Castellucci, co-produced with the Festival d-Aix-en-Provence, the controversial play The Doctor starring British stage and screen legend Juliet Stevenson, local company Patch Theatre's The Lighthouse and Tatzu Nishi's installation A Doll's House dominated social media, the Fire Gardens created a mesmerising firelight in one of Adelaide's favourite spots, the Adelaide Botanic Garden.
2021	Neil Armfield and Rachel Healy	The 36th Festival was a success despite the challenges of a global pandemic. It included Neil Armfield's production of Benjamin Britten's A Midsummer Night's Dream; local circus troupe Gravity and Other Myths; Young Adelaide Voices' Aurora choir's The Pulse; A German Life, starring Robyn Nevin; and a livestreamed set of four performances direct from Europe into Her Majesty's Theatre. The new Festival Club hosting the contemporary music program was for the first time housed in a new pop-up venue called The Summerhouse.
2022	Neil Armfield and Rachel Healy	Included 9 world premieres, 6 Australian premieres and 17 shows playing exclusively in Adelaide. Barrie Kosky directed the flagship opera, Rimsky-Korsakov's The Golden Cockerel; Neil Armfield directed a new oratorio about the murder of George Duncan, called Watershed: The Death of Dr Duncan; and Sydney Theatre Company presented The Picture of Dorian Gray, directed by Kip Williams. Audience of 227,404 across all events, total box office takings of A$4.9 million.
2023	Ruth Mackenzie	Largely programmed by outgoing directors Neil Armfield and Rachel Healy. The 52 events included Ivo van Hove's adaptation of A Little Life, Crystal Pite's Revisor and a concert by Lorde, with 19 world and Australian premieres.
2024	Ruth Mackenzie	Included 64 events, 16 world premieres, 12 Australian premieres and 23 Adelaide exclusives. International productions included operas from Barrie Kosky and Robert Lepage, the Australian premiere of Laurie Anderson's I’ll Be Your Mirror, Akram Khan's reimagining of The Jungle Book, and Elizabeth Streb's Time Machine, alongside local artists including Stephen Page (whose Baleen Moondjan opened the festival), Jacob Boehme, and Restless Dance Theatre.
2025	Brett Sheehy	
