= Liljan patsas =

Coordinates: 60°26′55″N 22°16′18″E

Lilja patsas
- Artist: Wäinö Aaltonen
- Year: 1927
- Type: Granite
- Location: Turku

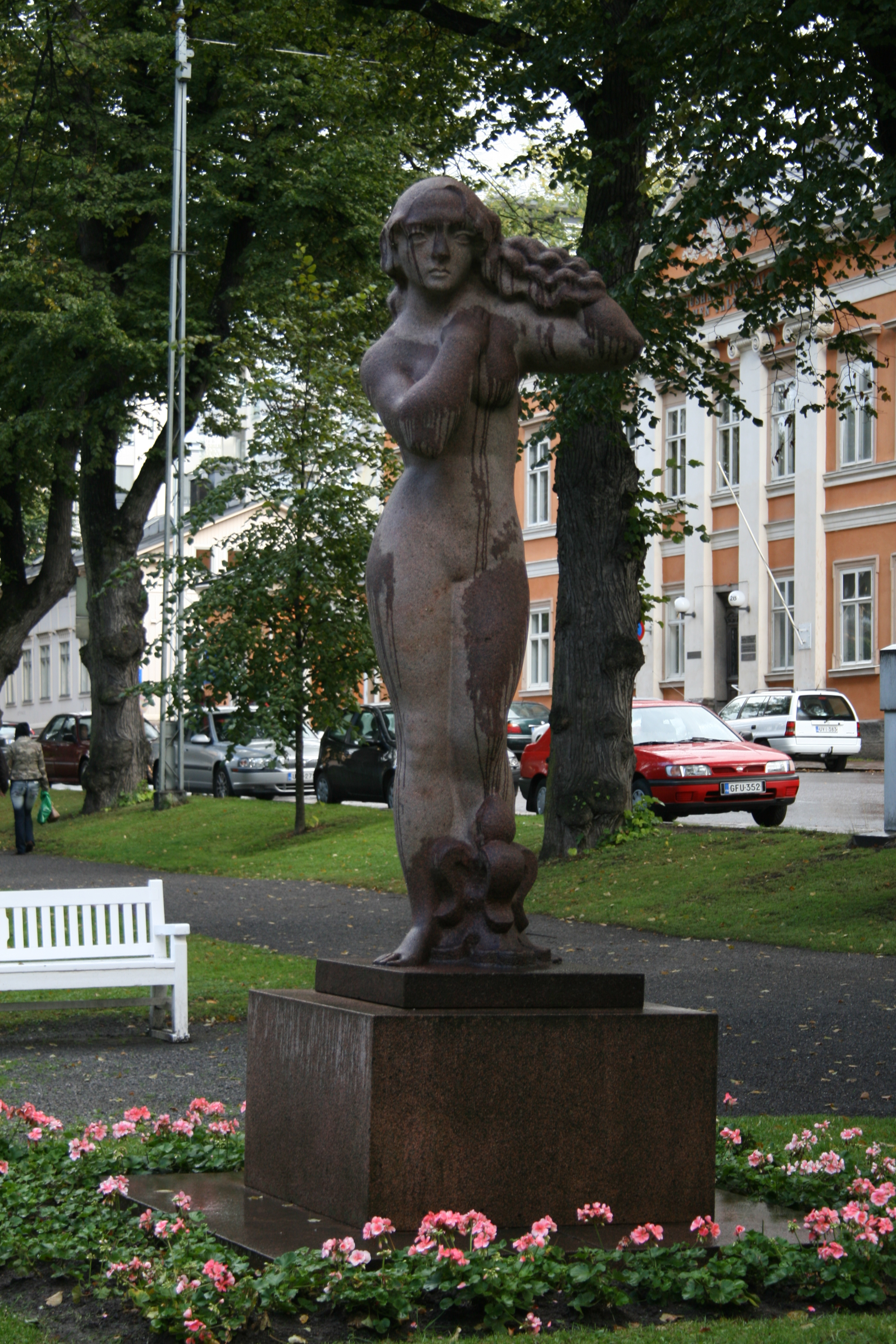
Lilan patsas, front view

Lilja is a red granite sculpture by Wäinö Aaltonen, located in Turku, Finland. It is located in Runeberginpuisto near the Aurasilta. It depicts the lily, the flower of the Turku coat of arms. In 1927, the statue was the first public art commission in Turku.

Today, the Lilja statue is a central part of Vappu in Turku. The traditional placing of the student cap on the head of the statue was first done in spring 1929 when students decided that, like the Havis Amanda student cap ceremony in Helsinki, Turku needed the same tradition. The student nation Turun yliopiston varsinaissuomalainen osakunta began the traditional cleaning of the statue for Vappu at the end of the 1960s.

The Lilja statue also goes by the name Turun Lilja/Åbo Lilja ("the lily of Turku").
