= 2002 Adelaide Festival =

The Adelaide Festival of Arts is Australia’s premier performing arts event. The 2002 Adelaide festival was the most controversial festival held since its establishment in 1960, described as the “worst-run, worst financed and worst marketed Festivals of all time”, resulting in the resignation of Artistic Director Peter Sellars and near bankruptcy of the festival.

== Vision ==
The initial appointment of internationally acclaimed American Opera Director Peter Sellars in 2000 was seen positively by media and the arts communities, described as an “inspired choice of artistic director”. Peter Sellars commented “I think South Australia is where the future not only of this country is going to be written, but where the future of the industrialized world is going to be written”. Peter Sellars was the first artistic director appointed from overseas since the 1994 Festival and the first American.

The 2002 Adelaide Festival had a vision markedly different from previous festivals, and intentionally moved away from the typical arts festival model used across the world. Sellars critiqued what he described as a “shopping trolley” approach to arts festival management, where "exotic tidbits are brought to the table of an overstuffed population" i.e. a director fills the ‘festival trolley’ with pre-existing work from around the world, rather than generating it locally. The 2002 festival was centred around three themes of the “Right to Cultural Diversity”, "Truth and Reconciliation", and "Ecological Sustainability".

Its purpose was empowerment and recognition to groups and creativity usually marginalised or colonised by hierarchical concepts of high culture. It was to privilege the local and the communal against the individual and virtuosic. It was to make us get real about the serious failures of our society to deal with Indigenous and social justice questions and to recognise that screen and media forms are the dominant modes in the digital economy.

== Financial Issues ==
Peter Sellars convinced the Adelaide Festival Board to accept a new programming model consisting of nine additional Associate Directors and numerous Advisory committees. These additional staff were estimated to add a cumulative expense of $1.8 million over two years leading up to the program. Sellars expected this additional cost to eventually be supported by the associate directors finding their own private sponsorships, but this was never achieved. This unrealistic expectation may have come from Sellar's work in American contexts where private support is much more common, whereas in Australia the mix of government, corporate and philanthropic funding is markedly different, especially in Adelaide where few major corporations have their headquarters.

There were several additional factors that are seen to have contributed to financial difficulties sponsorship. The Sydney Olympics in 2000 had further limited availability of sponsorship money, and the 2001 September 11 attacks created an environment of global uncertainty. Furthermore, in March 2001 it was revealed that the 2000 Adelaide Festival had resulted in a $1.5 million deficit, and the collapse of Ansett Airlines, a major sponsor for the Festival left a gap in the budget of $250,000.

== Controversial Advertising ==
A TV ad for the festival was developed - but not aired - featuring Adolf Hitler's face superimposed onto famous artists. The ad suggested that if Hitler had become an artist then the holocaust might have been avoided and “the world would have been a very different place through the power of good of the arts”. As a result of this, major sponsor Telstra withdrew its sponsorship, valued at $500,000. The ad was never aired, and Telstra eventually came back on board as a sponsor of the Festival. A replacement ad was aired consisting of a series of written inspirational quotes about the arts, ending with a voiceover saying “It doesn't matter what you think so long as you think”.

== Festival Program Launch ==
Partly due to the September 11 attacks and collapse of Ansett Airlines, the festival program launch was pushed back from early October to October 31, 2001, which meant that Sellars would not be able to attend since he was scheduled to be in Paris at the time to direct an Opera. Instead he recorded a video speech, but that did not arrive from Paris in time, so the CEO Sue Nattrass spoke instead. The absence of Sellars, criticism of festival content by media and artists, and a front-page story in The Advertiser just four days before titled “Hitler to Promote Festival” (relating to the proposed TV advertisement) contributed to negative feelings about the festival.
