= Discovering Columbus =

Artwork exhibit

Discovering Columbus is an installation artwork created by the Japanese artist Tatzu Nishi, which was exhibited to the public from 20 September to 18 November 2012.

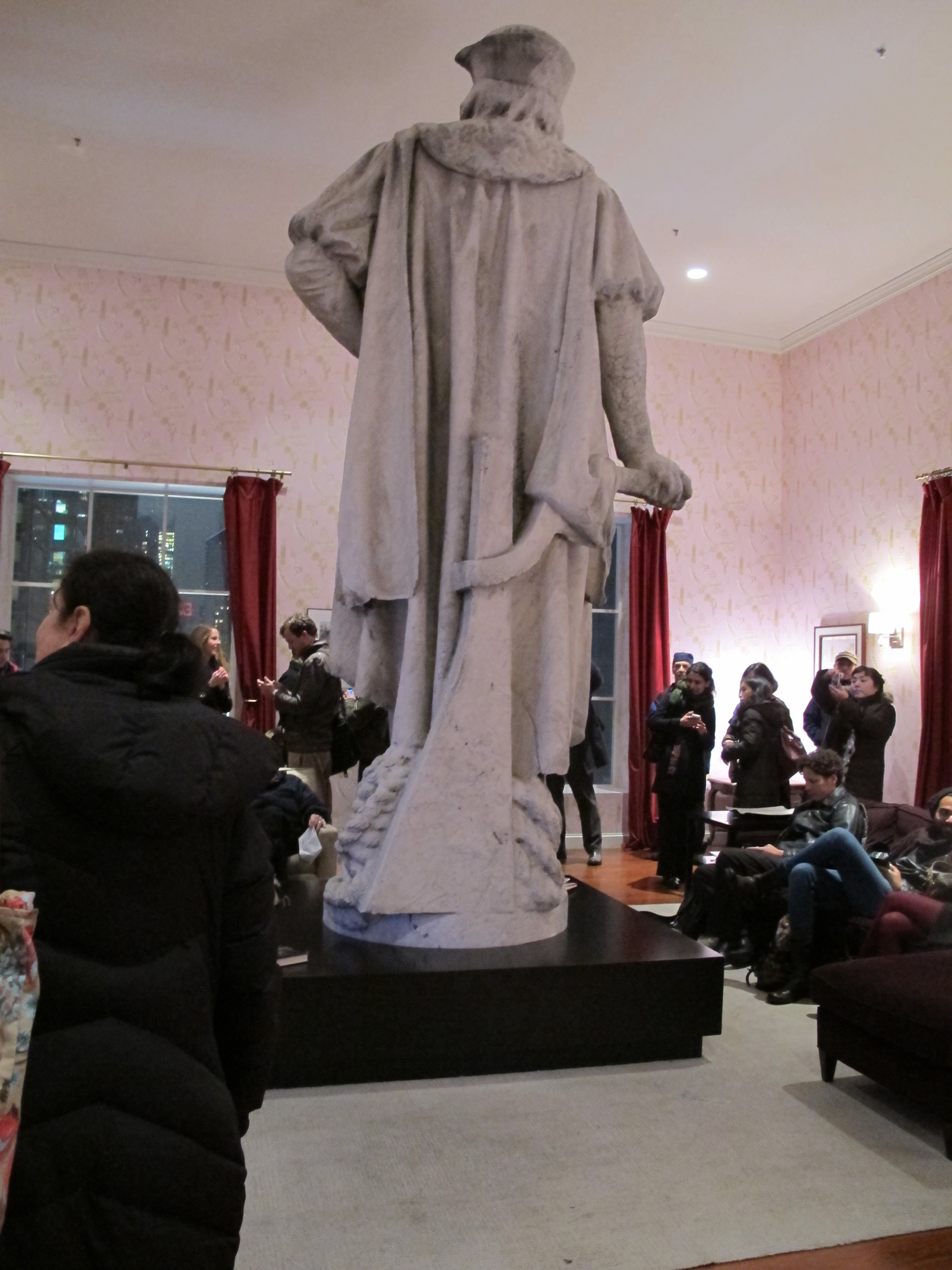

The work consisted of a temporary penthouse apartment surrounding Gaetano Russo's statue of Christopher Columbus which is located in the center of Columbus Circle in New York City, United States.

After the exhibition period, the piece was disassembled and the statue of Columbus restored.
