= James Baldwin (educator) =

American educator (1841–1925)

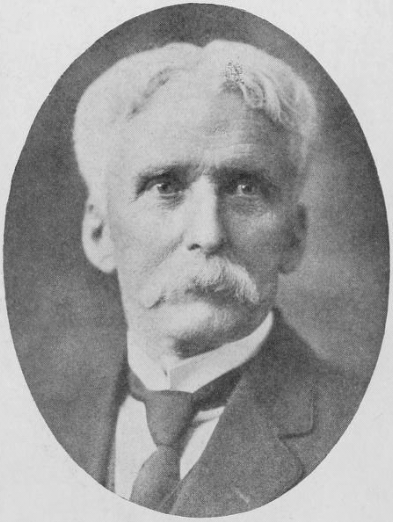
- Born: December 15, 1841; Hamilton County, Indiana, US
- Died: September 1, 1925 (aged 83); South Orange, New Jersey, US
- Occupation(s): Writer, educator

James Baldwin (1841–1925) was an American educator and administrator. He served as the superintendent of Indiana's school system for 18 years and then went on to become a widely published textbook editor and children's author in the subjects of legends, mythology, biography, and literature, among others.

== Biography ==
James Baldwin was born in Hamilton County, Indiana on December 15, 1841. He became an educator and administrator in that state starting at the age of 24. He served as the superintendent of Indiana's school system for 18 years

He was one of the most prolific authors of school books for children at the end of the 19th century and the beginning of the 20th. In addition to the Baldwin Readers (1897), he co-authored the Harper Readers (1888) and the Expressive Readers (1911). He wrote over thirty books about famous people in history and retold classical stories. His publications numbered 54 volumes. It is estimated that 26 million copies of his works sold worldwide, including in China and Indonesia. A self-educated man, he became a school superintendent before working as an editor for Harper's and later for the American Book Company.

He wrote more than fifty books, including Fifty Famous Stories Retold (1896) and Abraham Lincoln, a True Life (1904).

James Baldwin died at his home in South Orange, New Jersey on September 1, 1925.
