= Young Adelaide Voices =

Children's choir in Adelaide, South Australia

Young Adelaide Voices is a large children's choir in Adelaide, South Australia, run by Christie Anderson. They have won many international awards as well as at home and interstate. They were formerly known as the Adelaide Girls Choir, but became known as Young Adelaide Voices in November 2004, since which time membership has also been open to boys.

Young Adelaide Voices is a community choir formed in 1988. The choir has 250 members aged 5 to 25 years old, placed in 7 choirs according to age and experience. The choristers sing for a wide variety of functions, from community events to national and international conferences. In addition, the choir often performs as guest artists for professional organisations such as the Adelaide Festival Centre, the South Australian Police Band and the Adelaide Symphony Orchestra, with whom they have sung over 40 times and recorded one of their 9 CDs.

There have been four overseas tours to the UK, Europe, Canada and America, as well as interstate trips to Brisbane, Canberra and New South Wales. Their international performances have earned the choir world renown. The Concert Choir has given recitals in such places as Westminster Abbey, St Martin-in-the-Fields and St Paul's Cathedral, and even Disneyland in America.
