= Havis Amanda =

Sculpture in Helsinki, Finland

Coordinates: 60°10′03″N 024°57′05″E

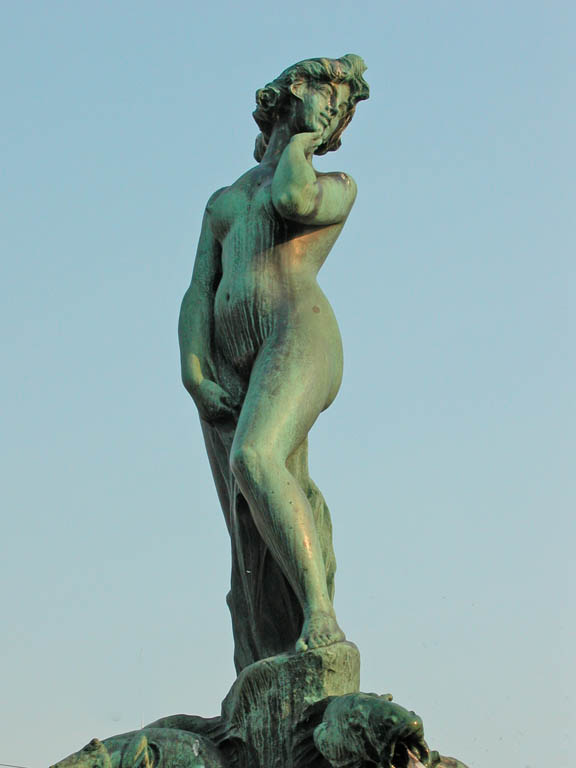
Havis Amanda in 2006

Havis Amanda is a fountain and a statue in Helsinki, Finland by the sculptor Ville Vallgren (1855–1940). The work was modelled in 1906 in Paris, and erected at its present location at the Market Square in Kaartinkaupunki in 1908. Today it is recognized as one of the most important and beloved pieces of art in Helsinki.

== Sculpture ==
The Havis Amanda is one of Vallgren's Parisian Art Nouveau works. Cast in bronze, it rests on a fountain made of granite. The sculpture is of a mermaid standing on seaweed as she rises from the water, with four fish spouting water at her feet, surrounded by four sea lions. Vallgren's intention was to symbolize the rebirth of Helsinki. The height of the statue is 1.94 metres (6 ft 4 in) and with the pedestal it stands 5 metres (16 ft) tall. According to Vallgren's letters the model for the statue was a then 19-year-old Parisian woman, Marcelle Delquini.

Vallgren himself simply called the work Merenneito (English: The Mermaid), but it quickly started to get additional nicknames. The Finland-Swedish newspapers dubbed it Havis Amanda and the Finnish Haaviston Manta or simply Manta. Havis Amanda is the common name used in brochures and travel guides.

== History ==
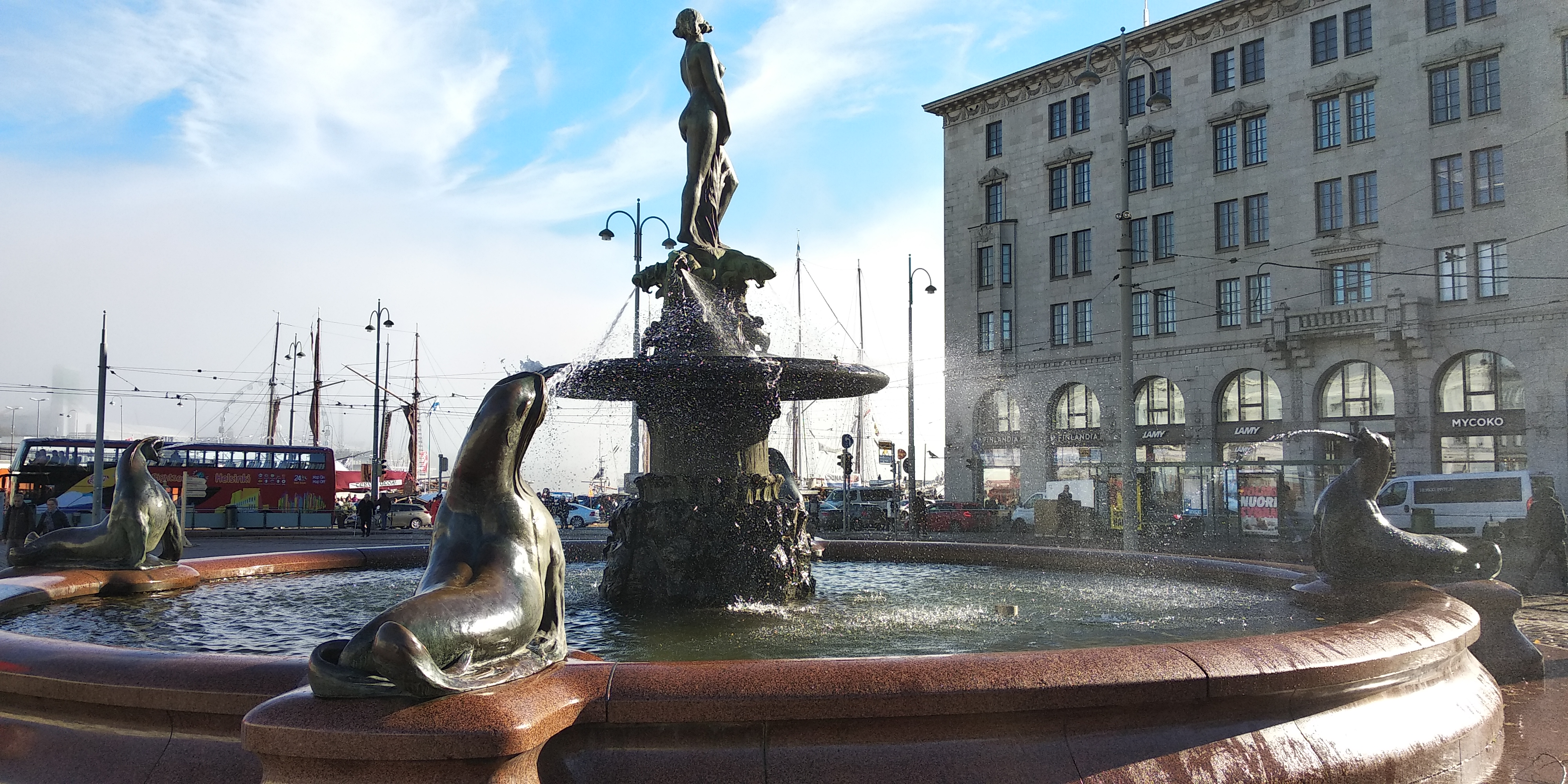
Havis Amanda, with the Market Square and the South Harbour in the background, 2018.

Havis Amanda was unveiled on September 20, 1908. The work drew strong criticism at first, especially from women. Its nakedness and seductiveness were considered inappropriate. Not all groups objected to the nudity per se, but putting it on a pedestal was thought to subjugate women by sexually objectifying them and making them appear weak. Some women's rights groups criticised the look of the figure as plain or "a common French whore", lacking innocence. The sea lions, with their human tongues hanging out, were said to represent men lusting after the mademoiselle. Vallgren considered himself a worshipper of women. Many in the cultural elite of Finland considered Vallgren an outsider and had judged his work even before it was finished. A good friend of his, Albert Edelfelt, was instrumental through his influence in getting the work ordered.

Every year on Vappu, Manta serves as a centrepiece for the celebrations. Students of the local universities place a student cap on the head of the statue in an elaborate ceremony called "Mantan lakitus" ("The capping of Manta").

In 2002 Spencer Tunick organized a photoshoot of voluntary nude Finns, of whom almost 2000 showed up, posing around the statue as part of his Nude Adrift, Finland 3 project. In 2014 artist Tatzu Nishi constructed a temporary hotel setting around the statue called Hotel Manta where visitors could see the statue in a new, unusual setting.

There are fears of the old and hollow statue possibly breaking from people climbing on it. In 2019 there were calls from officials to limit celebrations and climbing on the statue. During 2020's Vappu, out of concern for the COVID-19 pandemic, the city and the police decided to fence off the statue for the time being and directed the public towards a digital version of capping the statue.

== Gallery ==
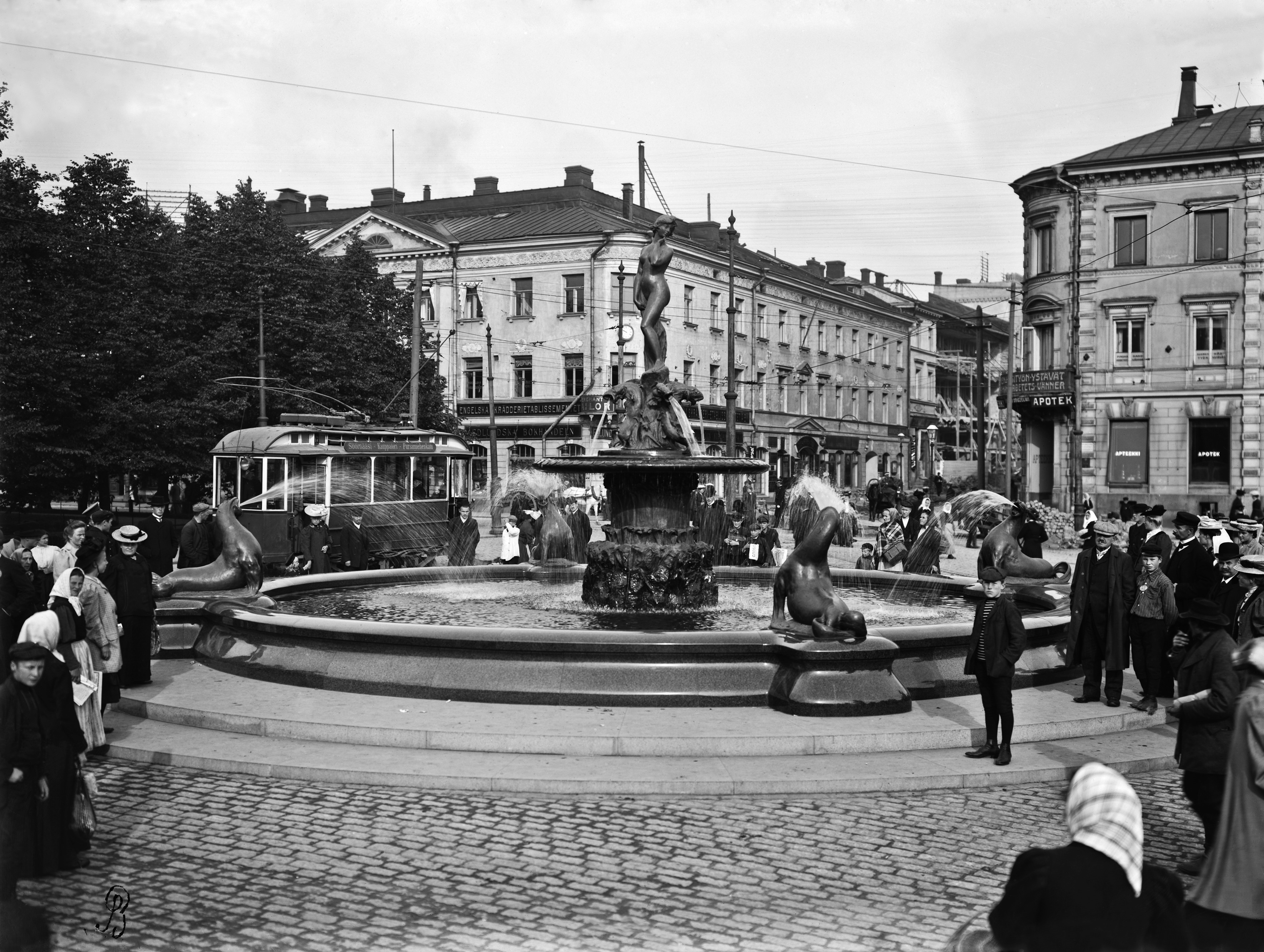
Shortly after inauguration in 1908

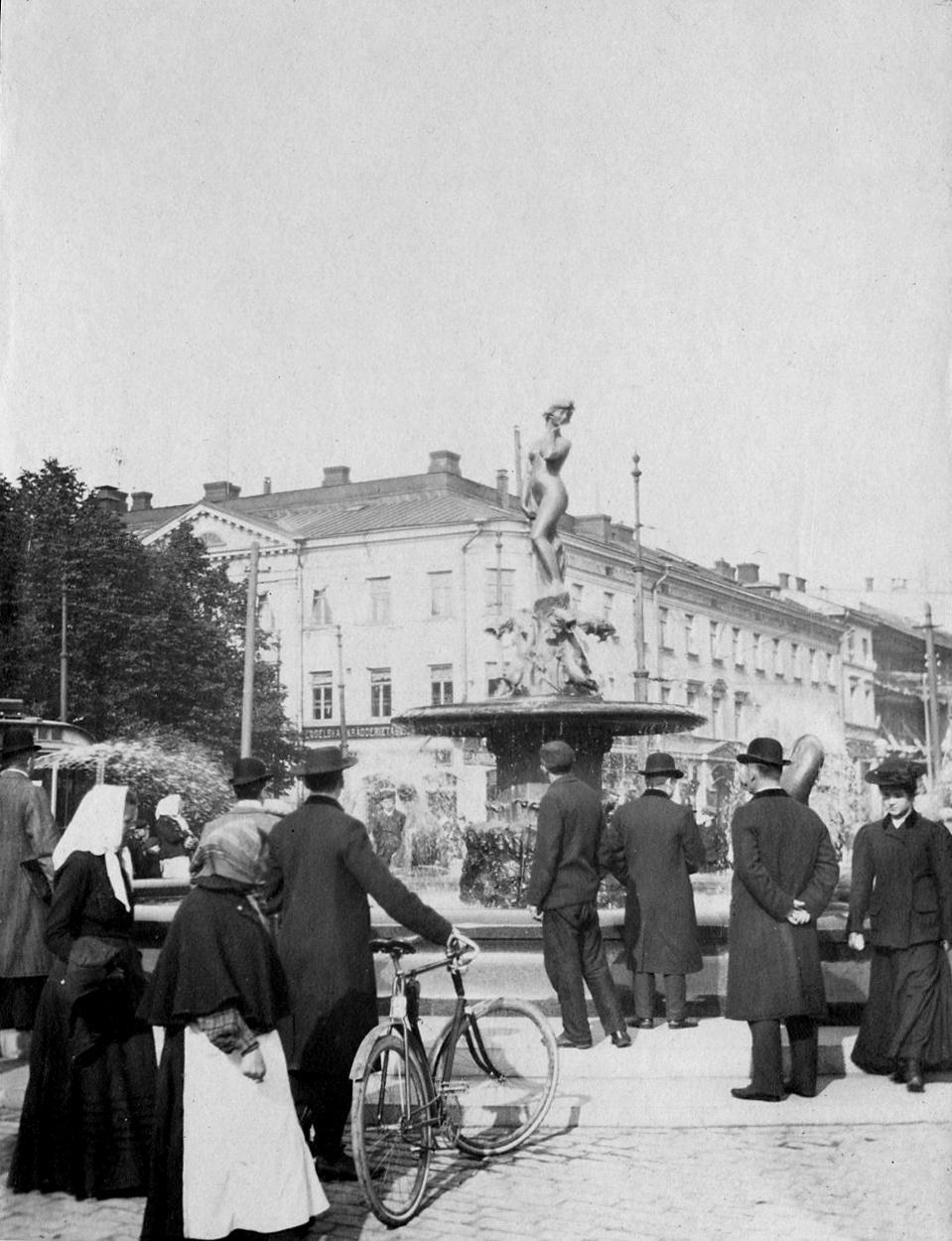
After inauguration, 1908

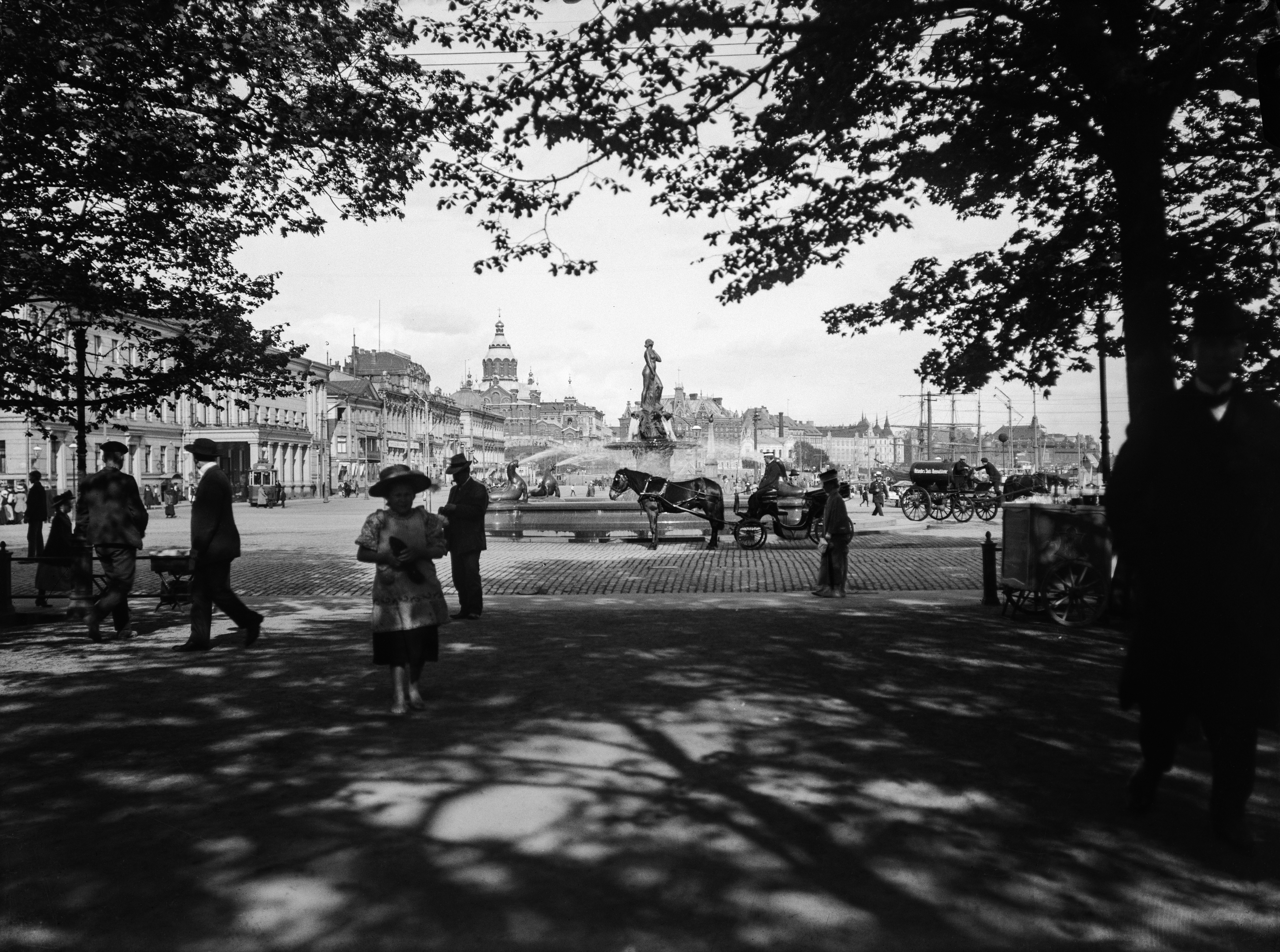
In 1910s with a rental horse-drawn carriage parked in front

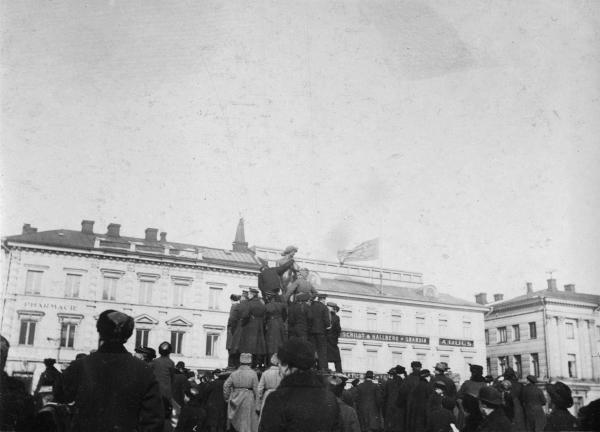
Russian soldiers on the fountain during Russian Revolution, 17 March 1917

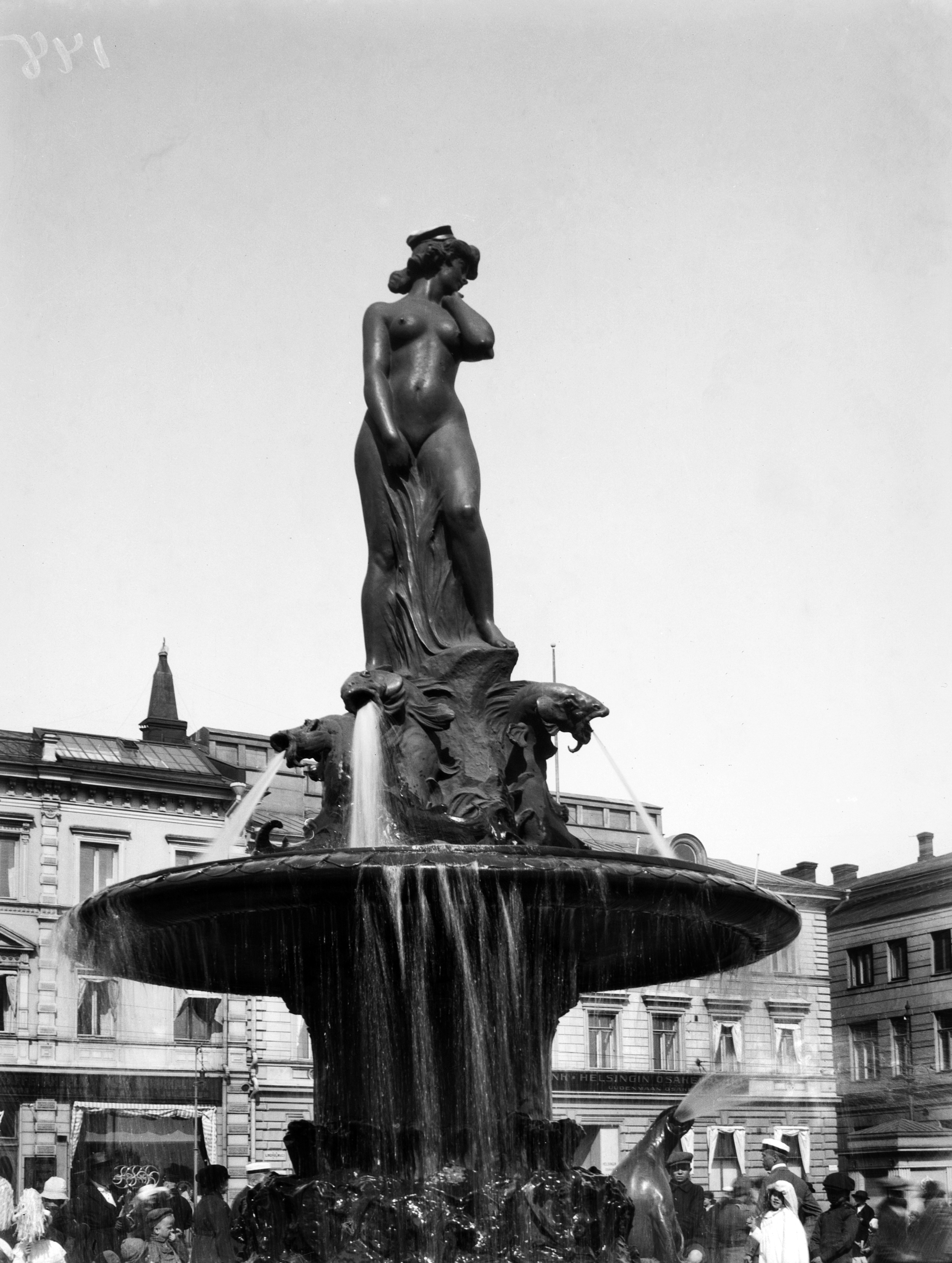
Havis Amanda with a student cap, Vappu 1921

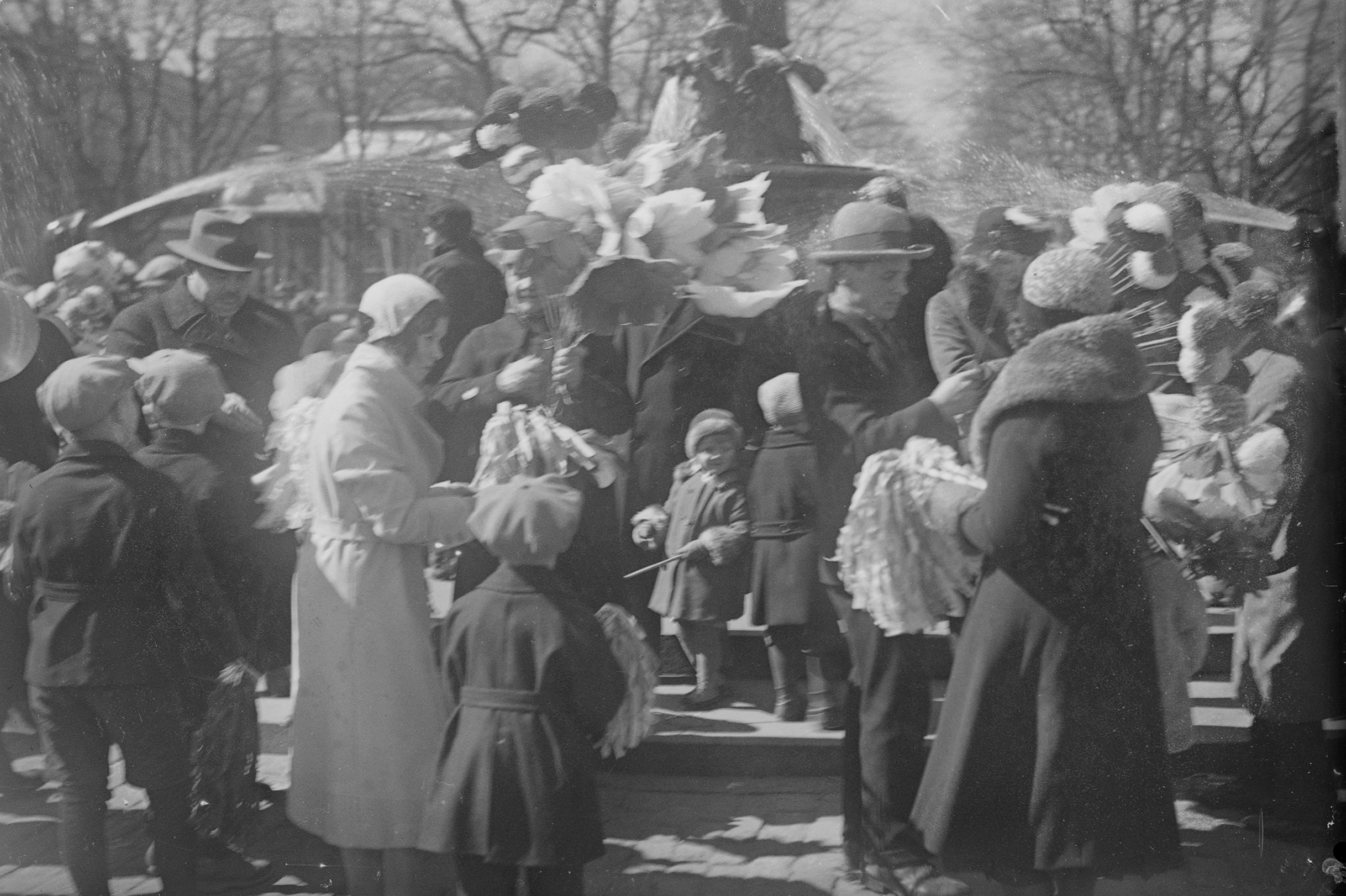
Vappu celebrators by the fountain in 1932

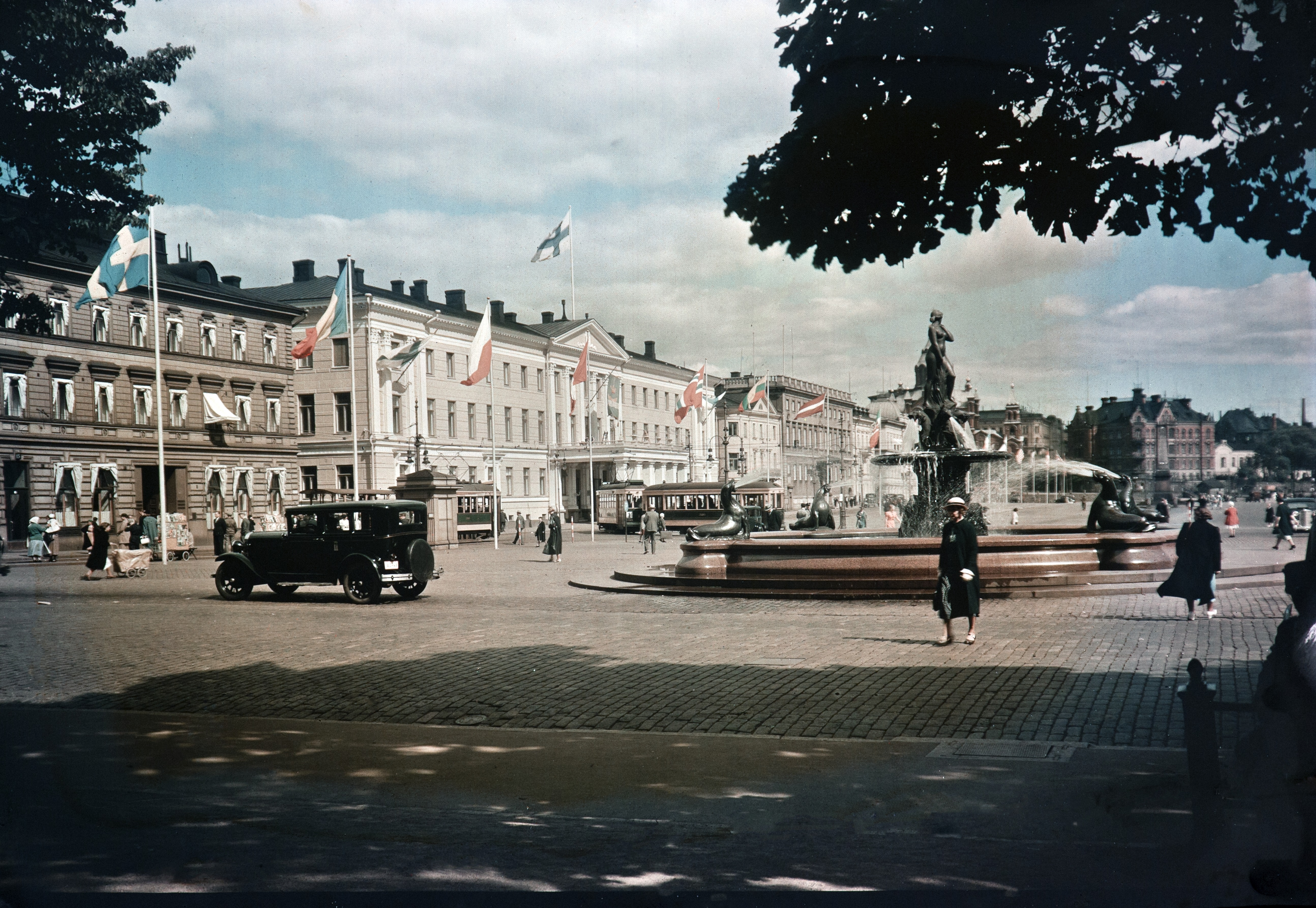
Late 1930s color view of the Market Square

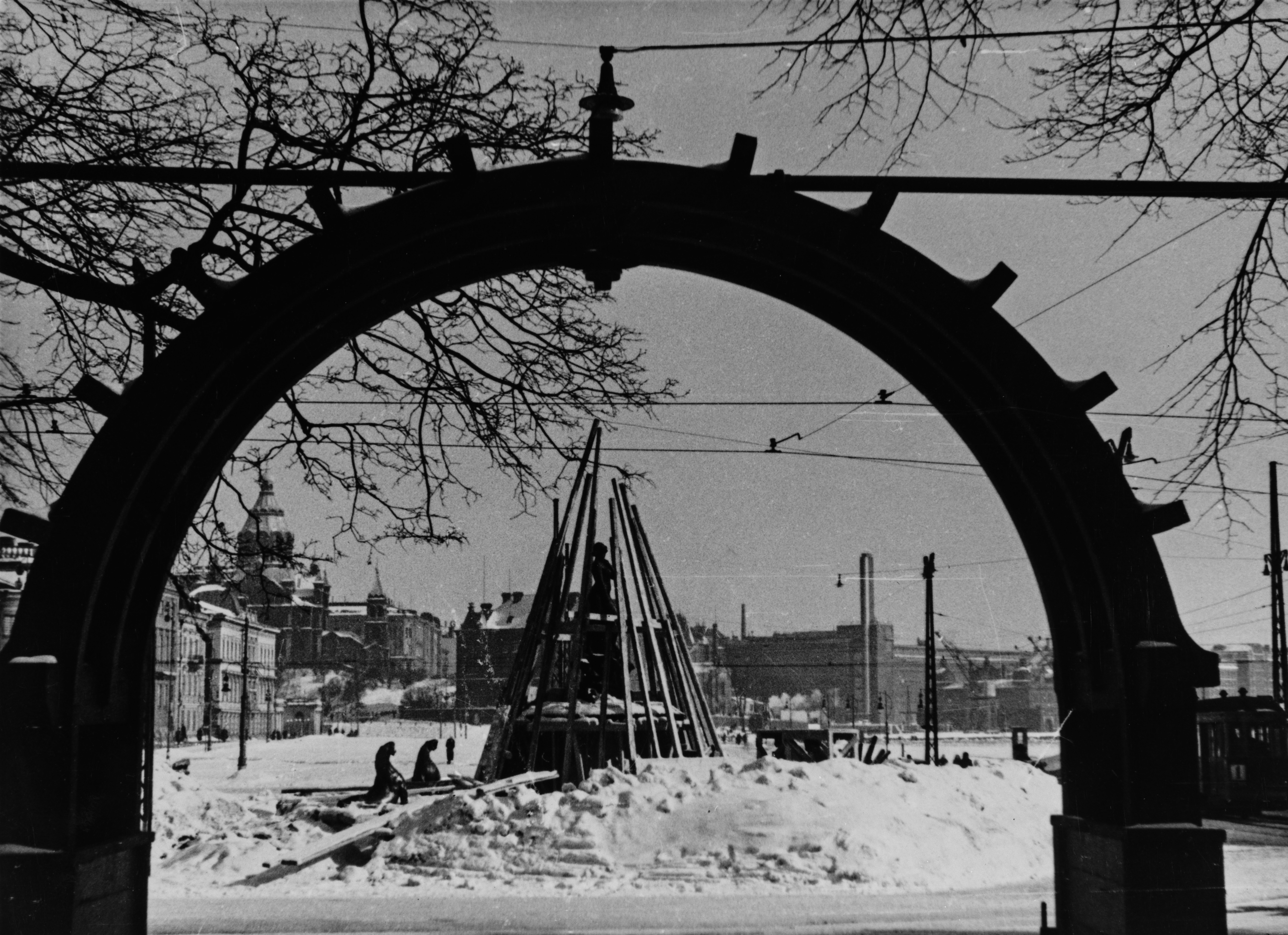
Shielded during the Winter War, 1940

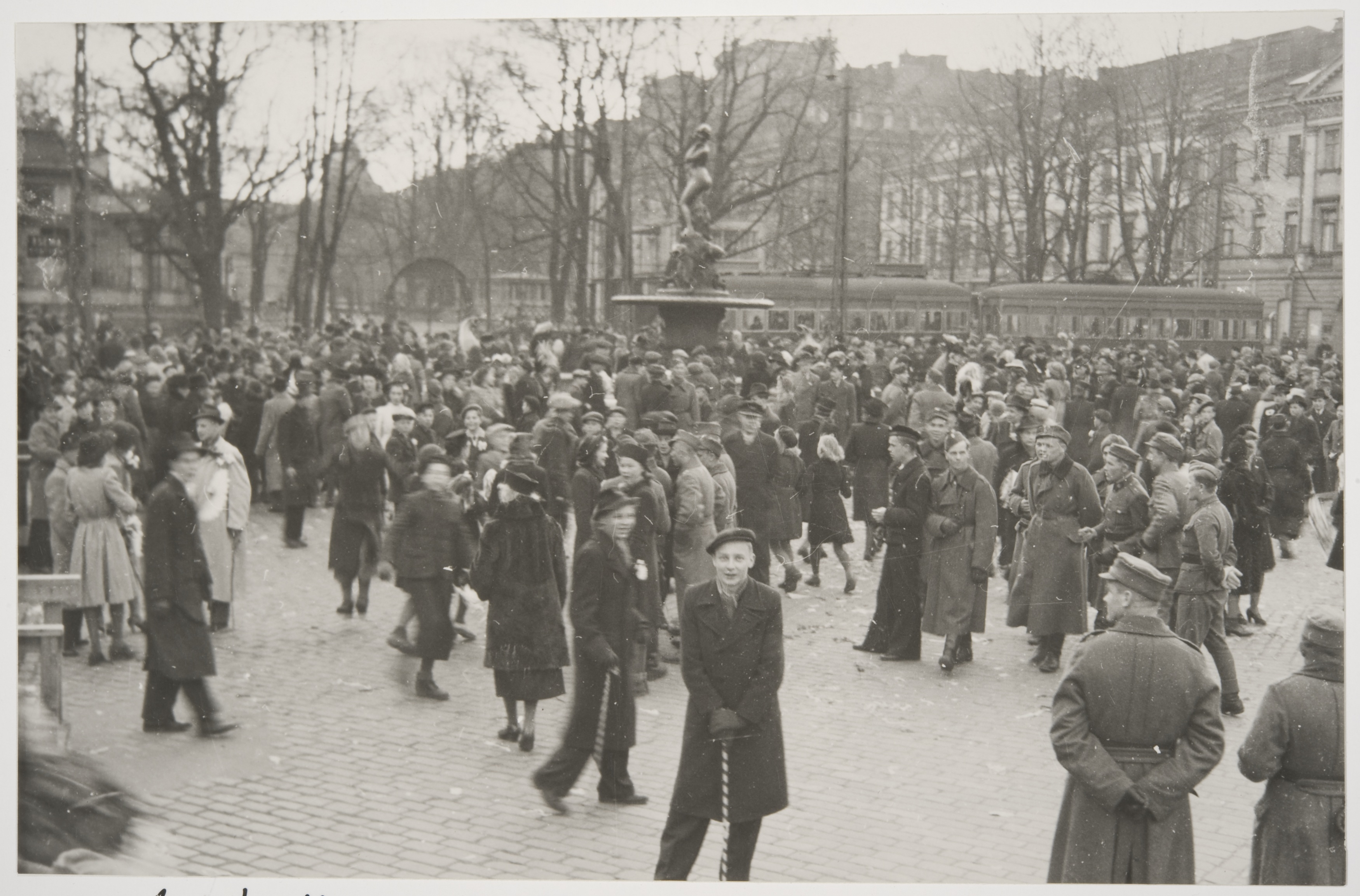
During Continuation War, Vappu 1944

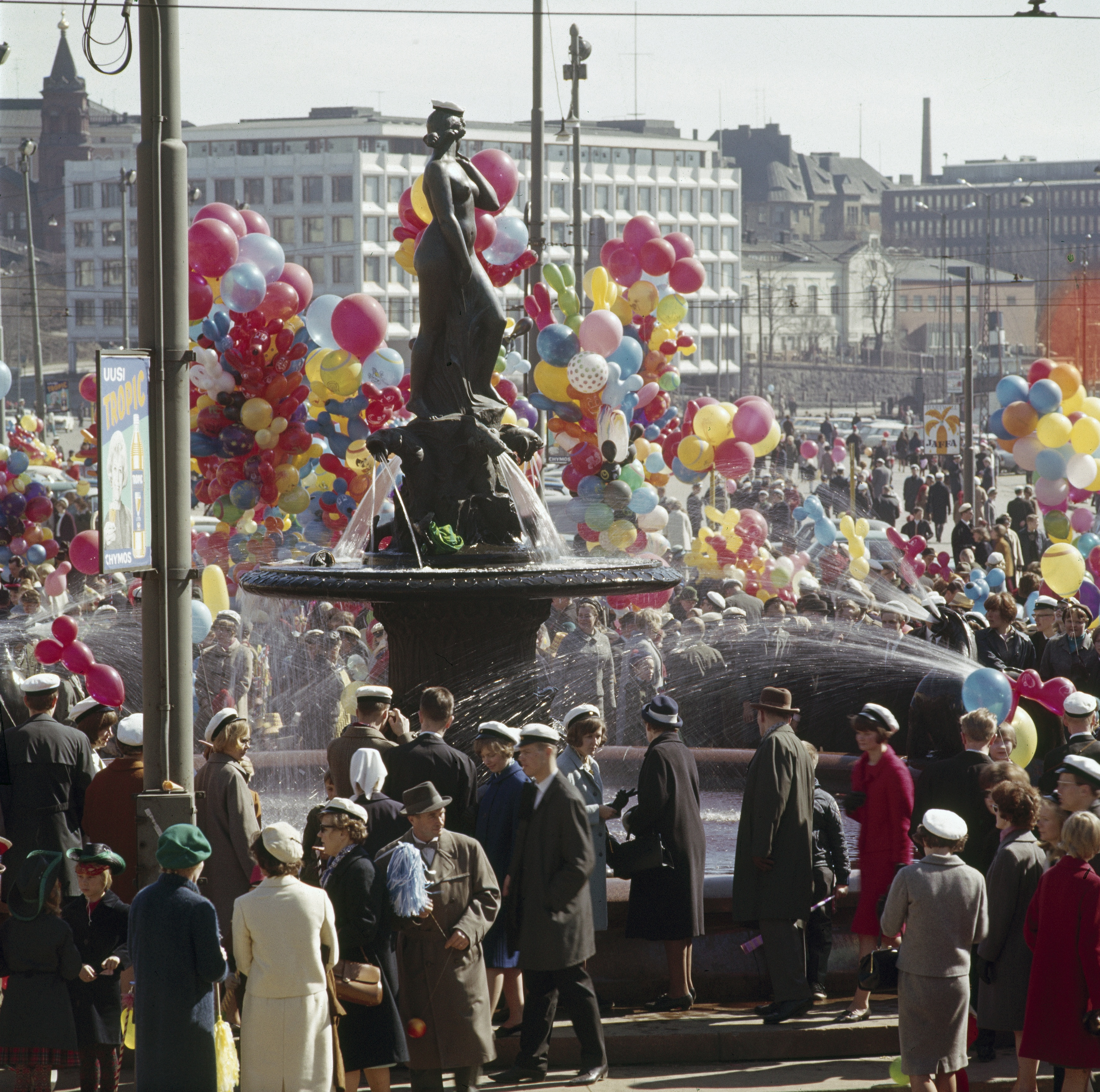
Balloon-filled festivities in 1959–1960, with Erik Bruun's 1959 Jaffa palm tree poster in the background

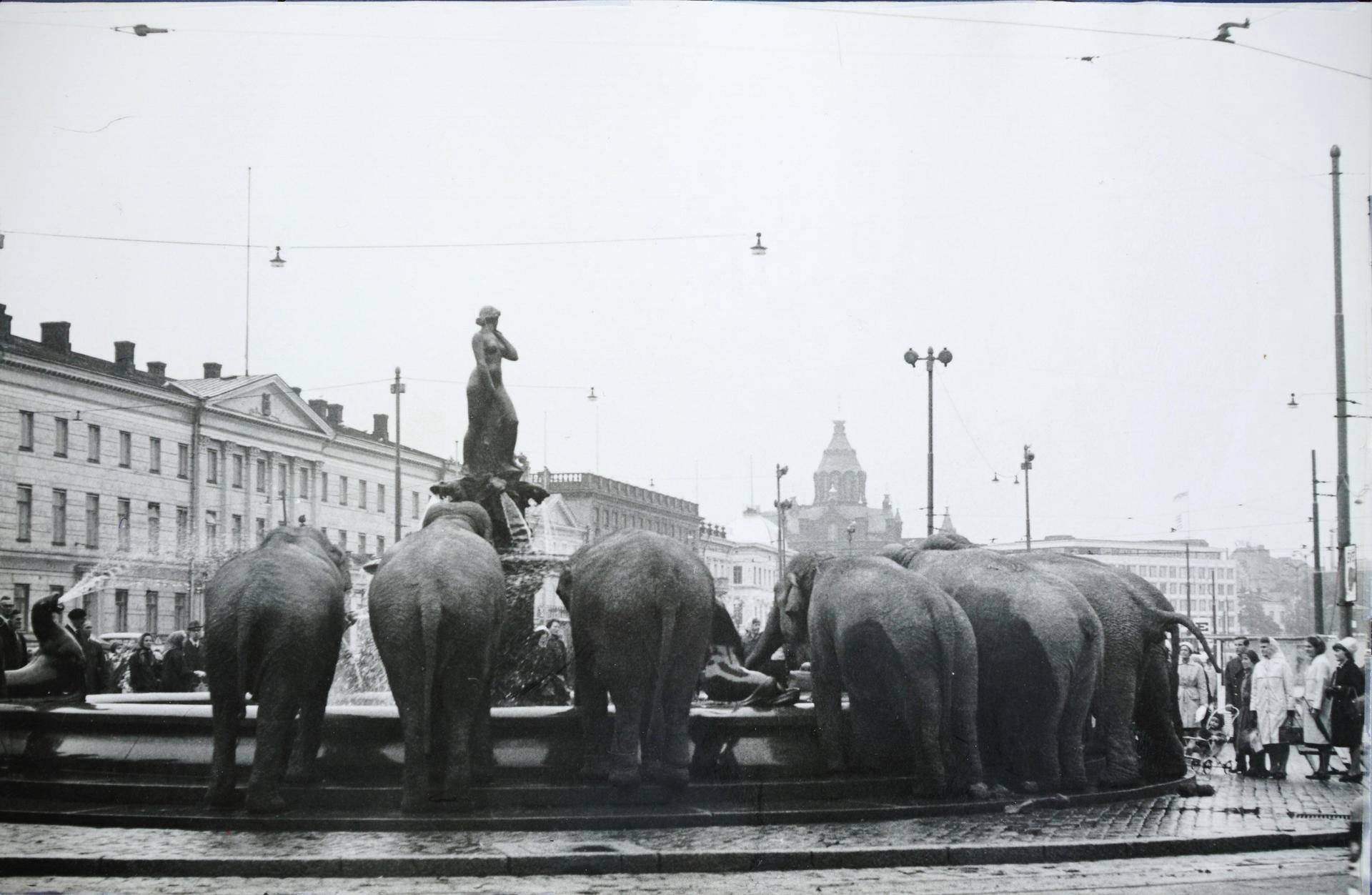
Elephants of the Swedish Circus Caravan drinking from the fountain in 1964

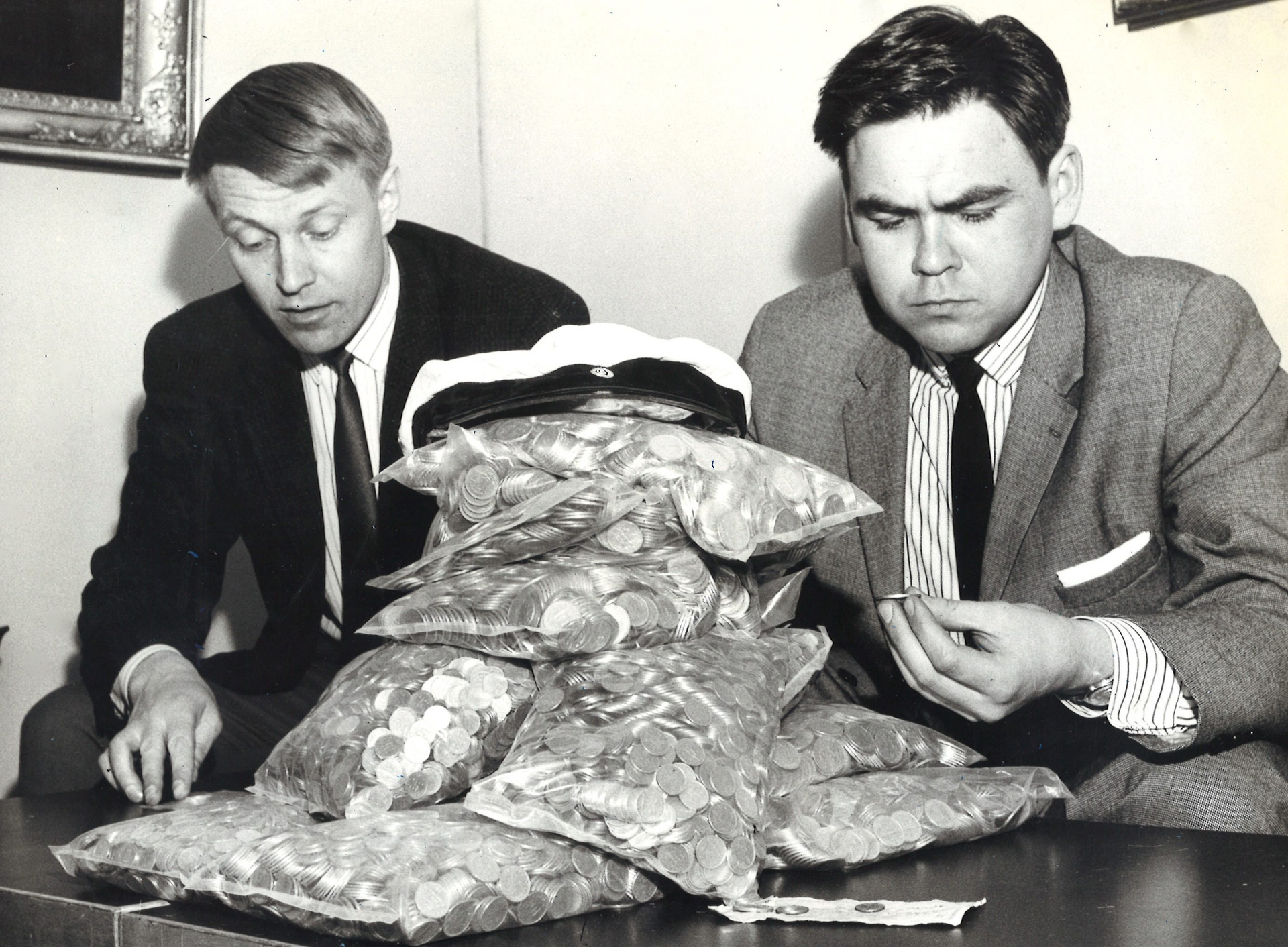
University students looking at coins collected from the fountain in 1965, with the large special cap on top of the coin bags

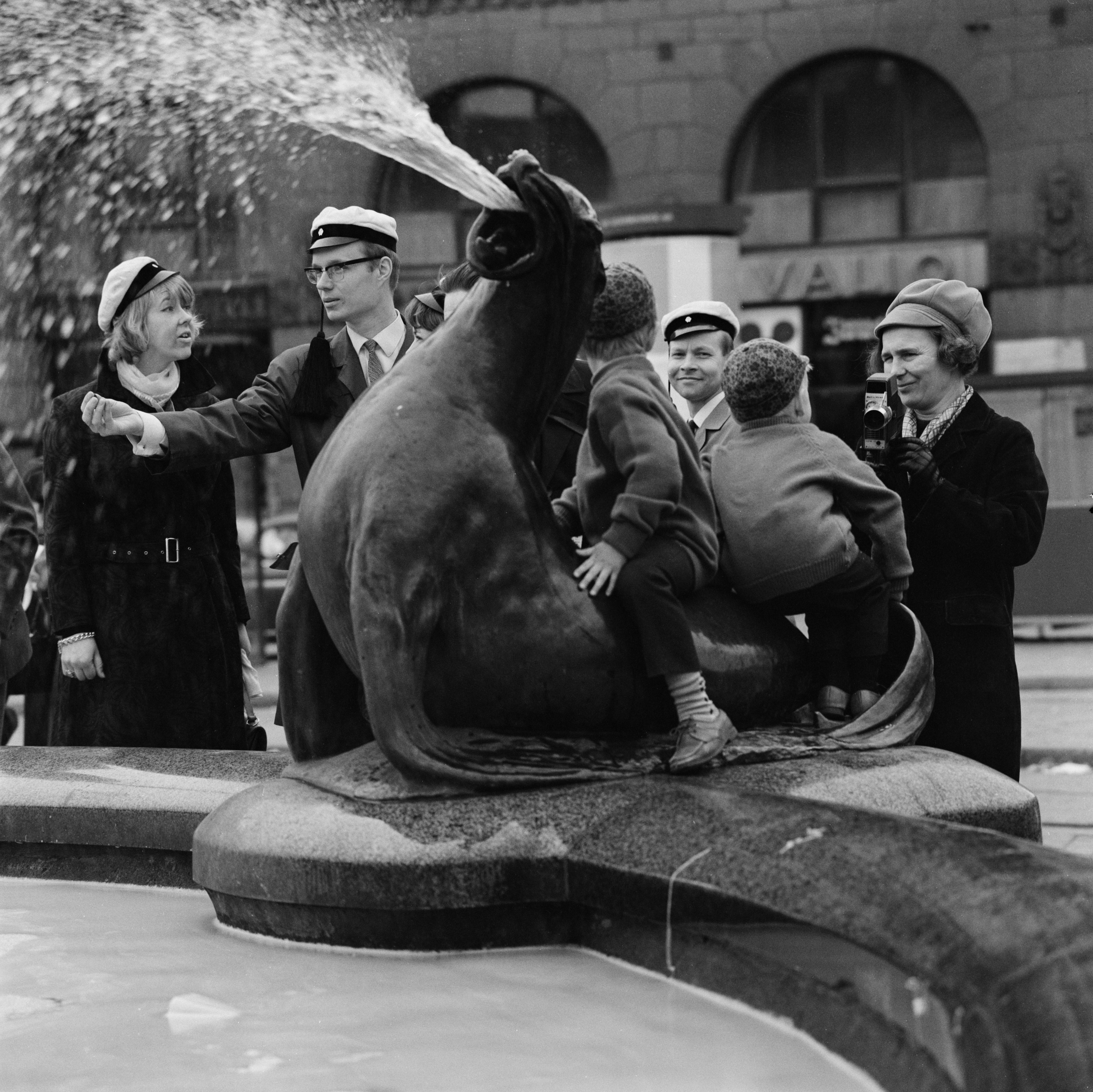
Children playing on a sea lion and a man throwing a coin, 1968

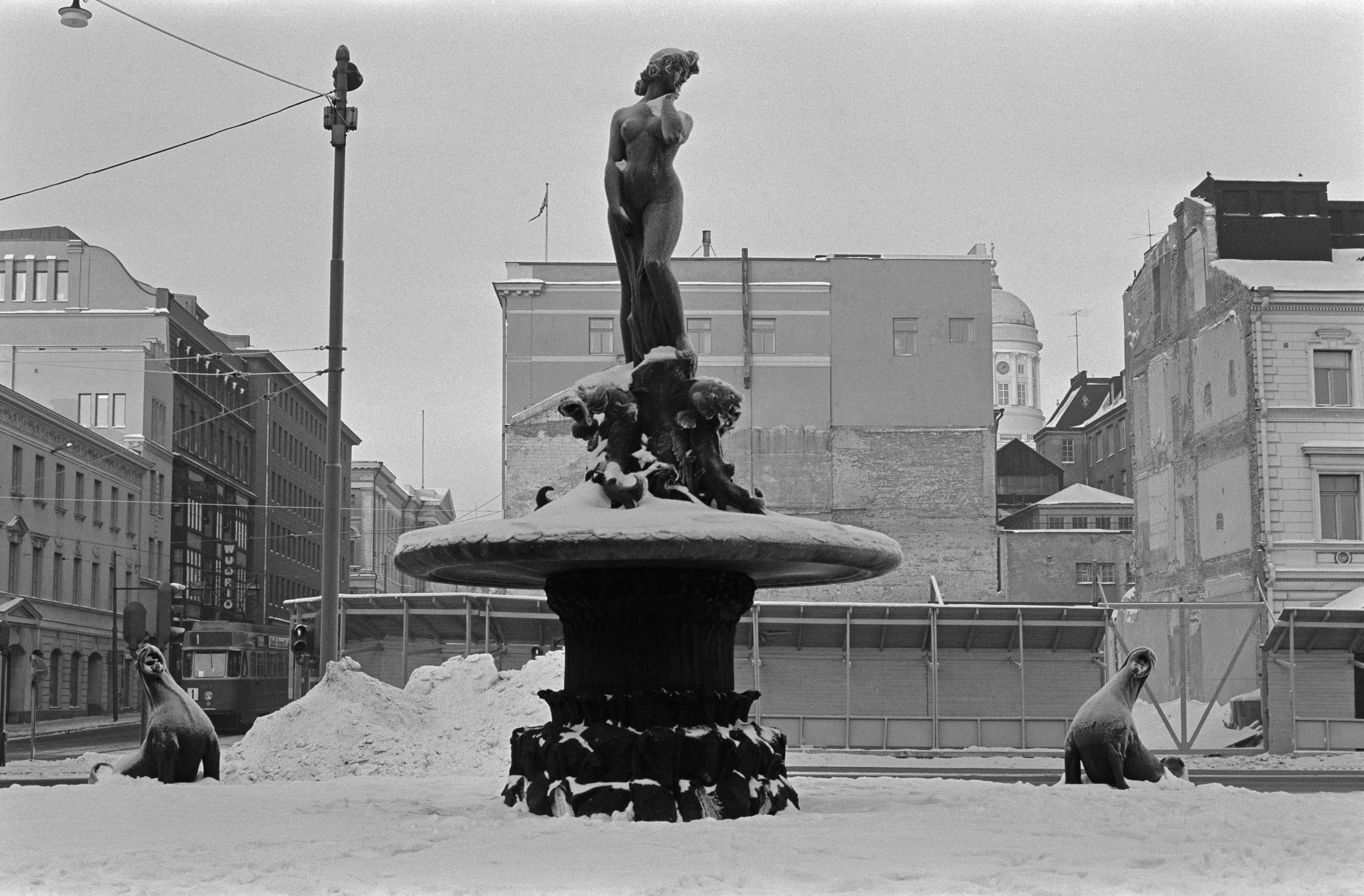
With snow on top, winter in the 1970s

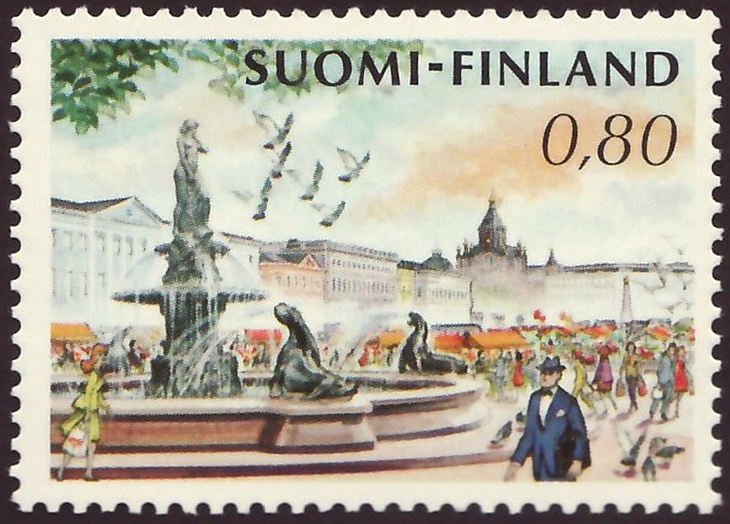
Postage stamp from 1976

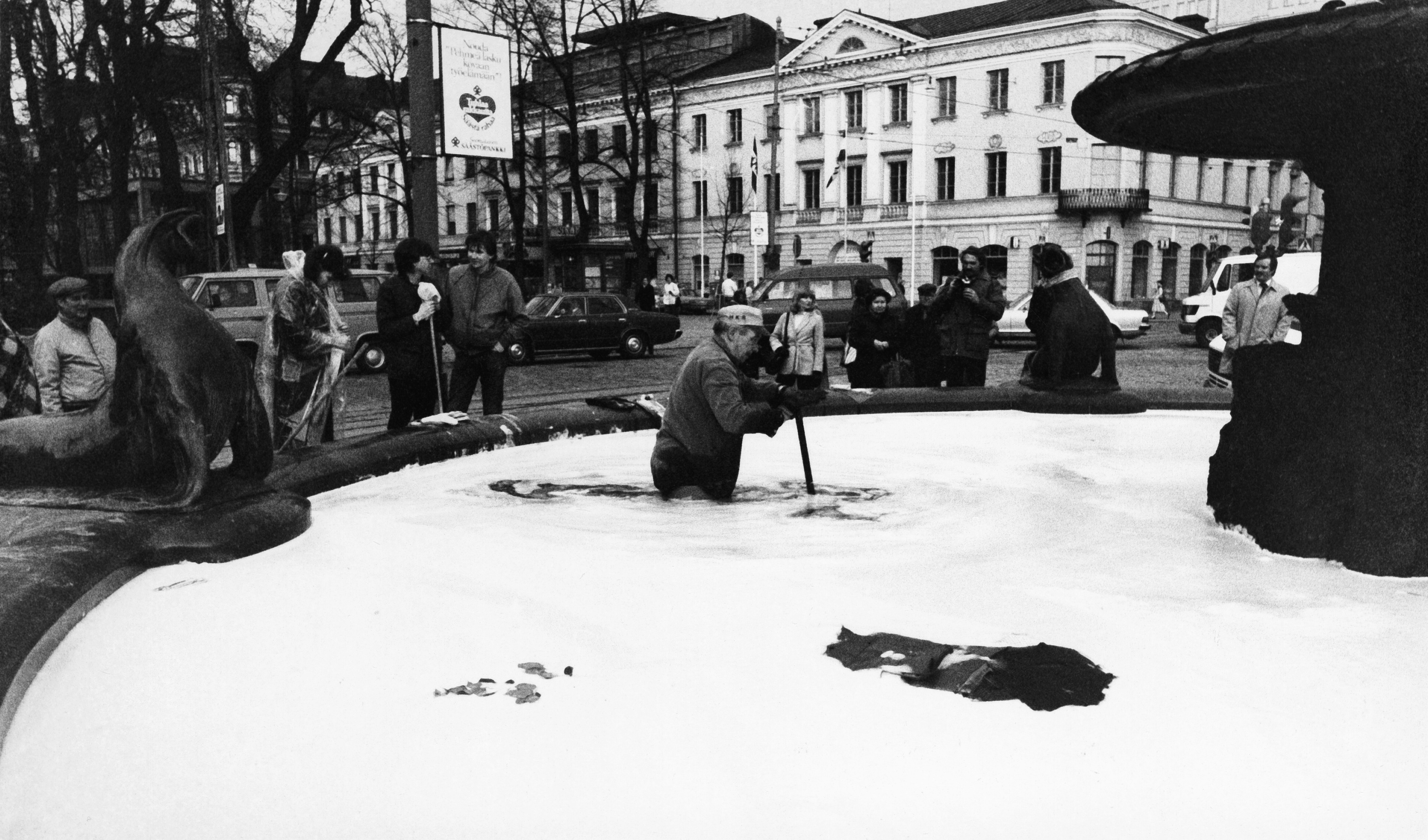
The fountain being cleaned after celebrations in 1983

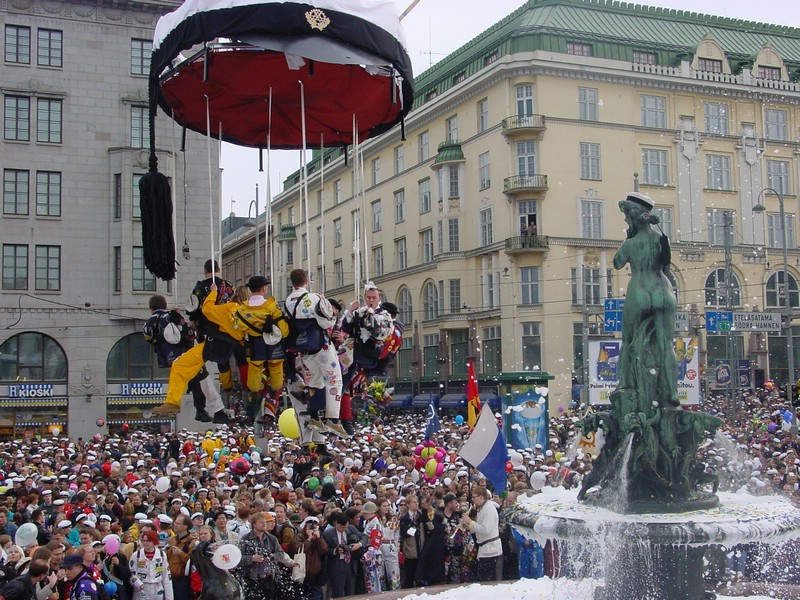
TKK students having placed the student cap on Havis Amanda during the Vappu celebrations in 2002

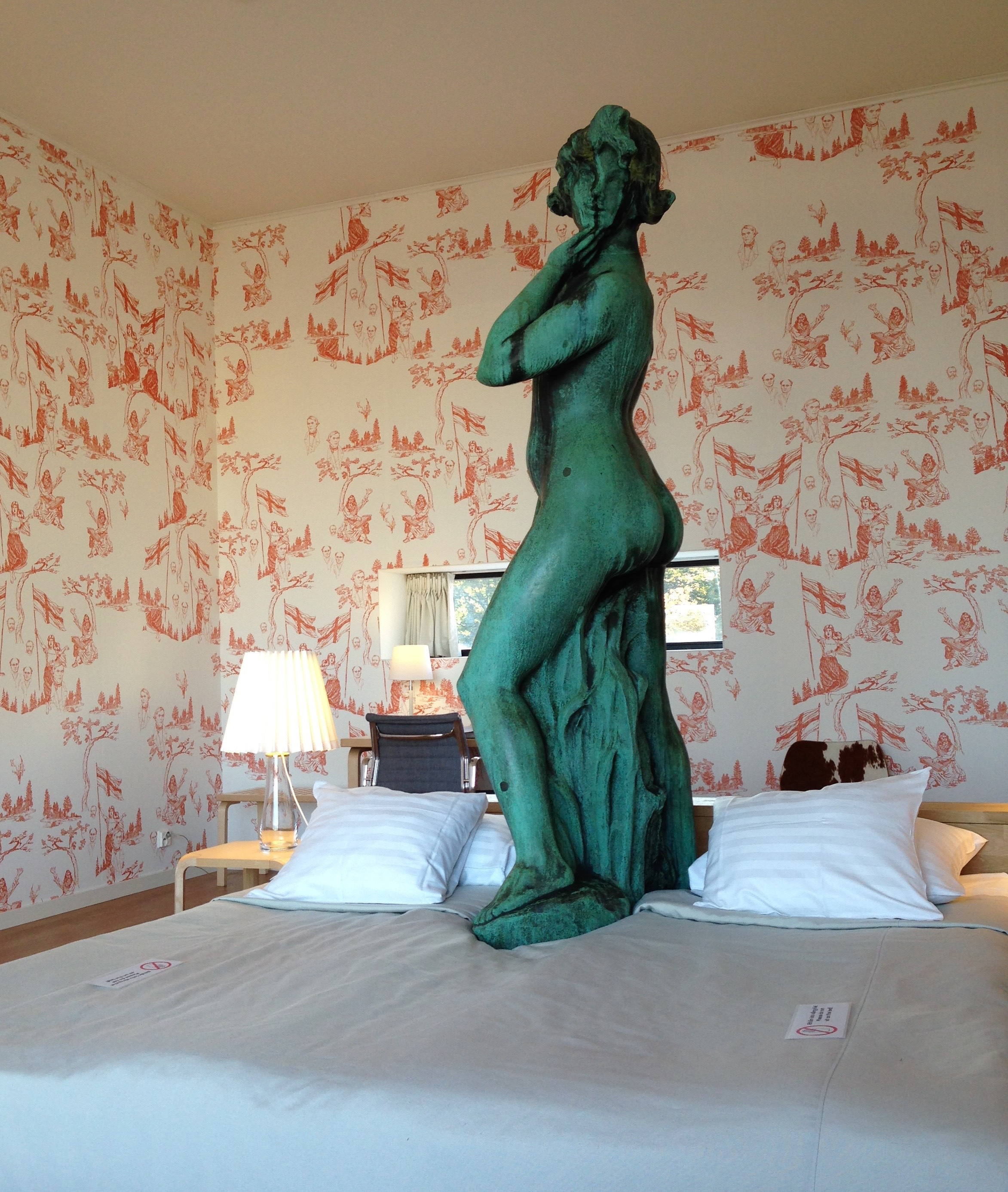
Hotel Manta art installation by Tatzu Nishi in 2014

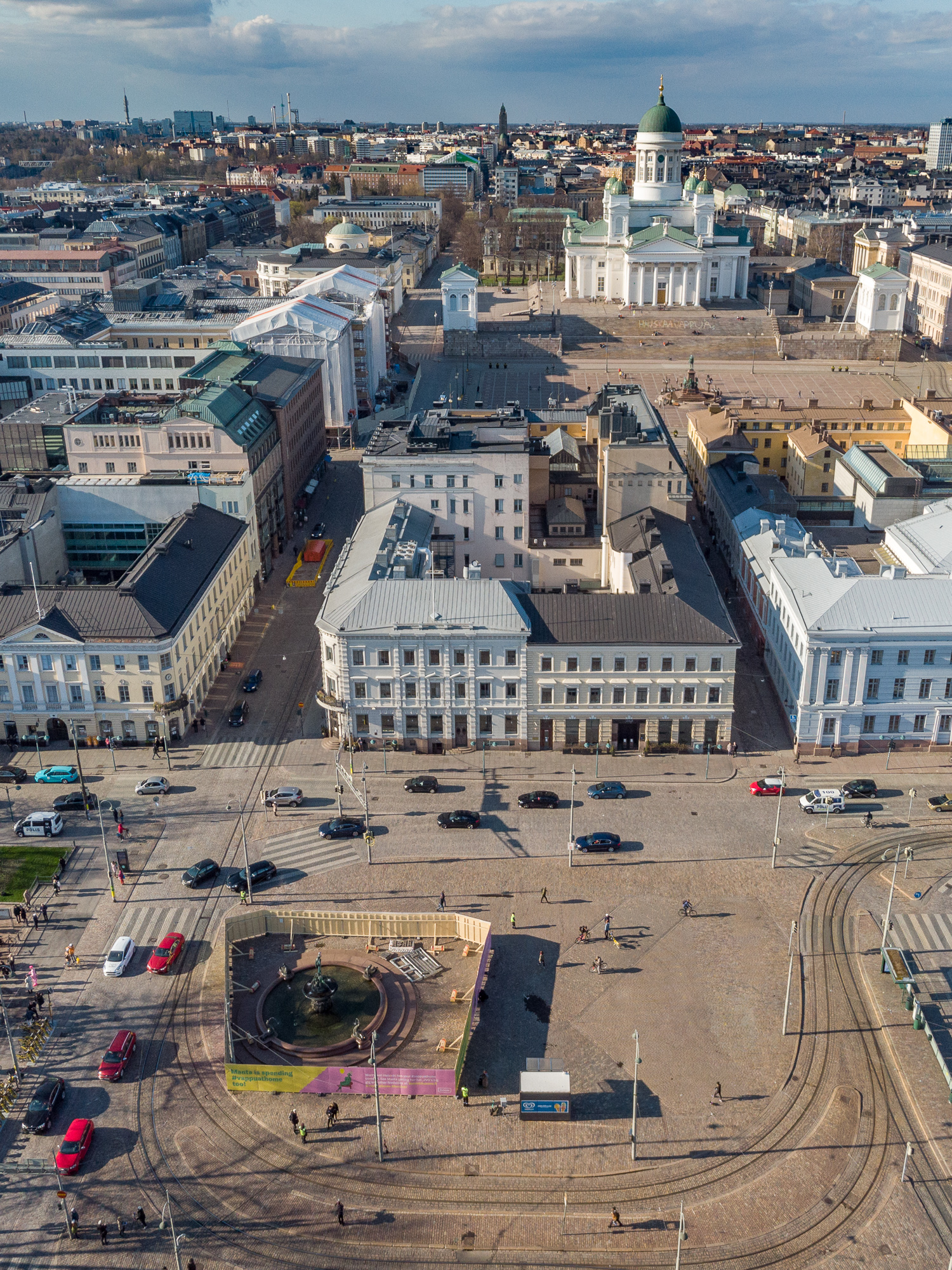
Havis Amanda in 2020, during the COVID-19 pandemic

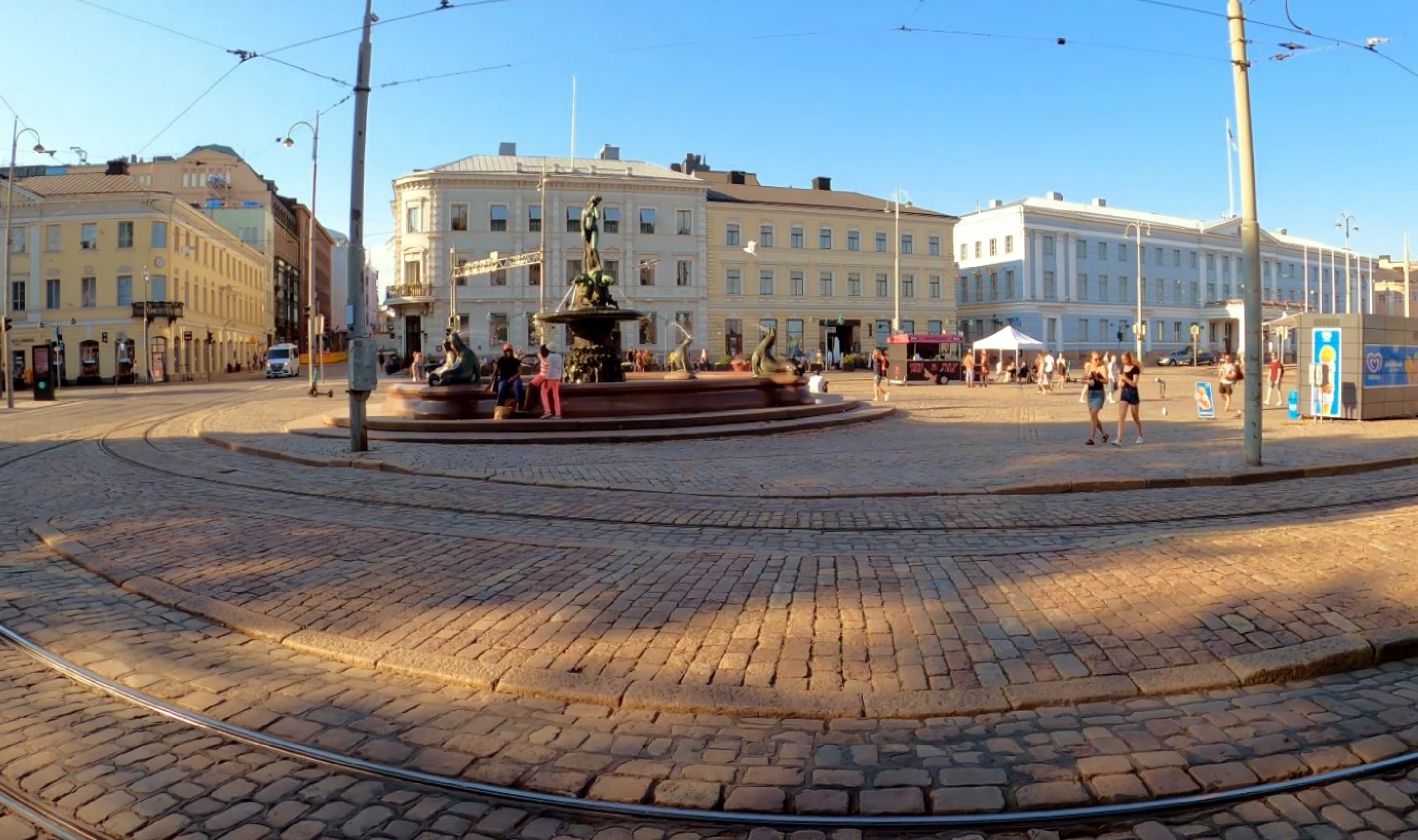
Havis Amanda at the Helsinki Market Square in June 2020

== See also ==
- Art in Finland
