= Christopher Hunt =

English publisher

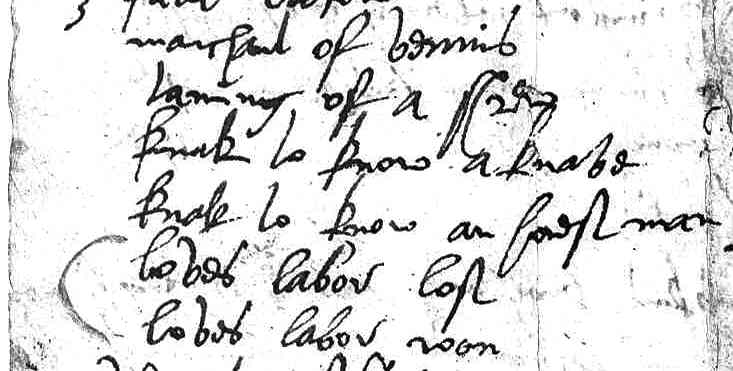
- Partial list of plays from Hunt's inventory. (Note: From top: marchant of vennis, taming of a shrew, knak to know a knave, knak to know an honest man, loves labor lost, loves labor won.)
- Occupations: Bookseller; stationer
- Years active: 1584–1607

Christopher Hunt (fl. 1585–1607) was an Exeter bookseller and stationer.

== Life ==
He was the son of Walter Hunt, a cordwainer of Blandford in Dorset. On 12 January 1585 he apprenticed himself to Thomas Man, a London stationer for a period of eight years, beginning the previous Christmas Day. He was admitted to the Stationer's Company as a freeman on 2 October 1592, and returned to Exeter and made a freeman in 1593. There he opened a stationery in the parish of St. Martin, selling books and other items such as writing supplies, and had two titles printed for him in London by Adam Islip, both of them translations by the Cornish translator and antiquary Richard Carew. He removed to London some time before May 1606 and located a shop in Paternoster Row.

His wife's name is unknown. He had at least two children, Anne, baptised 24 March 1599 at St Martin's Church, and a son, Thomas, baptised 16 January 1602 in the same church, also a stationer.

== Imprints ==
- Godfrey of Bvlloigne, or the Recouerie of Hiervsalem. An Heroicall Poeme, written in Italian by Seig. Torquato Tasso, and translated into English by R(ichard) C(arew), Esquire; and now the first part, containing fiue Cantos, Imprinted in both Languages. London, Imprinted by Iohn Windet for Christopher Hunt, of Exceter, 1594. (Quarto, 235 pages)
- Examen de Ingenios. The Examination of Mens Wits. In which, by discouering the varietie of Natures, is shewed for what Profession each one is apt, and how far he shall profit therein. By John Huarte. Translated out of the Spanish Tongue by M. Camillo Camilli. Englished out of his Italian by R [ichard] C [arew], Esquire. London, Printed by Adam Islip for Christopher Hunt, at Exeter, 1594. (Quarto, 333 pages and a Table.)
- The Parricide Papist, or Cut-throate Catholicke. A tragicall discourse of a murther lately committed at Padstow in the Countie of Cornewall by a professed Papist, killing his owne Father, and afterwardes himselfe, in zeal of his Popish Religion. The 11 of March last past. 1606. Written by G. Closse, Preacher of the Word of God at Blacke Torrington in Devon. Printed at London for Christopher Hunt, dwelling in Pater-noster-row, neare the Kings-head. [1607]. (Quarto, 12 leaves.)

Hunt also had a patent granted by King James I to print a book titled Householders practise.

== Love's Labour's Won ==
In 1954 fragments of Hunt's daybook at Blandford Fair in Dorset were found in the binding of a book of sermons published in 1637, one dated August 1603 and the other September 1607. On the verso of the 1603 sheet a list of 16 "[inter]ludes and tragedyes" sold from 9 to 17 August 1603 was found. The list included four of Shakespeare's plays, Merchant of Venice, The Taming of a Shrew, Love's Labour's Lost, and Love's Labour's Won, a play that had been mentioned by Francis Meres in his Palladis Tamia, (1598) but for which no other evidence had been found. The find provided evidence that the play was in fact a unique work that had been published but lost and not an early title of some other Shakespeare play. Currently, this inventory list resides in the Rare Book & Manuscript Library at the University of Illinois at Urbana-Champaign.
