= Tatzu Nishi =

Japanese artist

- Born: Nishino Tatsu; 1960 (age 65–66); Nagoya, Japan
- Occupation: artist

Villa Cheminée in Cordemais, France, an art installation by Tatzu Nishi

Tatzu Nishi (西野達, Nishino Tatsu; born Tazro Niscino 1960) is a Japanese site specific installation artist. He has created and exhibited works under the pseudonyms Tatzu Oozu, Tatsurou Bashi, Taturo Atzu, and Amabouz Taturo.

Nishi is known for his art interventions, which often transform historical monuments by surrounding a statue or a small element of a building with domestic space. In some cases the sculptures also operate as functioning hotels. Nishi prefers doing his work outside of museums and galleries. He chooses large-size projects to involve more people participating and being interested in art. He has a preference for human-made or artificial nature rather than real nature. He discussed the perspective that Japanese people might not have a strong inclination towards nature as reflected in traditional Japanese gardening practices like Bonsai or Shakkei. The "act of thinking" piqued his interest in artificial nature.

== Life ==
Nishi was born Tazro Niscino in 1960 in Nagoya, Japan. He studied at Musashino Art University, Tokyo from 1981 until 1984. Later he moved to Germany and enrolled at Kunstakadamie, Münster. The artist divides his time between Berlin and Tokyo.

In 2017, Tatzu Nishi was selected for the Minister of Education, Culture, Sports, Science and Technology's Art Encouragement Prize in Japan.

== Works ==
Nishi has built public artworks, sometimes in the form of fabricated hotels and apartments, around historical monuments in Europe, Australia, Asia and North America.

=== 2000 ===
Nishi created one of his first hotel installations in Aachen, Germany in 2000. Titled Hotel Continental, the work consisted of a two-room hotel built around a classical sculpture of a horse by Gerhard Mareks. The work faced the Theater Aachen, and was available for public viewing during the day and rental as hotel rooms during overnight.

=== 2002 ===
In 2002 Nishi constructed a small one-room apartment around a wind vane on the rood of the Basel Minster Cathedral in Switzerland. To reach the room, visitors had to climb scaffolding to a height of 40 meters (130 ft). Once they arrived in the room, they could sit at a coffee table that featured the cathedral's normally inaccessible spire as a table ornament. The work could be booked in the evening as a hotel room, at the rate of 8000 yen (US$100) per night.

In one of his best-known projects, the 2002 Villa Victoria, Nishi built a functioning hotel with a single room around the large statue of Queen Victoria at the Victoria Monument in Liverpool. The room included wall to wall carpeting, wallpaper and furnishings reflecting a five-star hotel. At the center of the room was the imposing 4.42 metres (14.5 ft) statue of Queen Victoria. The work was created under the artist name "Tatsurou Bashi".

=== 2004 ===
In 2004, he made a project called Café Moon Rider, in which he converted a freight container into a Café that functioned normally, except that he suspended it into the air by a crane, providing patrons with a panoramic view of Dublin.

=== 2006 ===
In 2006, Nishi built a bedroom around the Pyrotechnist, a statue of a man seated on a horse that is used as a brand symbol for the Tokyo Hermès store. The piece, titled Cheri in the Sky was located on the outside upper wall of the store, at a height of 45 45 metres (148 ft).

=== 2009 ===
War and Peace and in between was a site-specific installation artwork in which the public sculptures The Offerings of Peace and The Offerings of War in Sydney, Australia were incorporated into domestic scenes. The work was commissioned by Kaldor Public Art Projects and was on display from October 2009 to February 2010.

=== 2011 ===
For the 2011 Singapore Biennale, Tatzu Nishi created a luxury hotel room around the Merlion statue, which is a well-known tourist attraction. The room included full amenities and the guest's own butler during a visitor's stay. The outside of the hotel room was painted maroon and had 'The Merlion Hotel' written alongside. The room had a view that faced towards the Marina Bay. During the daytime, visitors were allowed to see the inside of the fully-furnished hotel room that encased the head of the Merlion. Nishi was the first guest who spent the night in the hotel and afterward allowed for the public to make reservations that cost SGD 150 (at the time) for two people.

=== 2012 ===
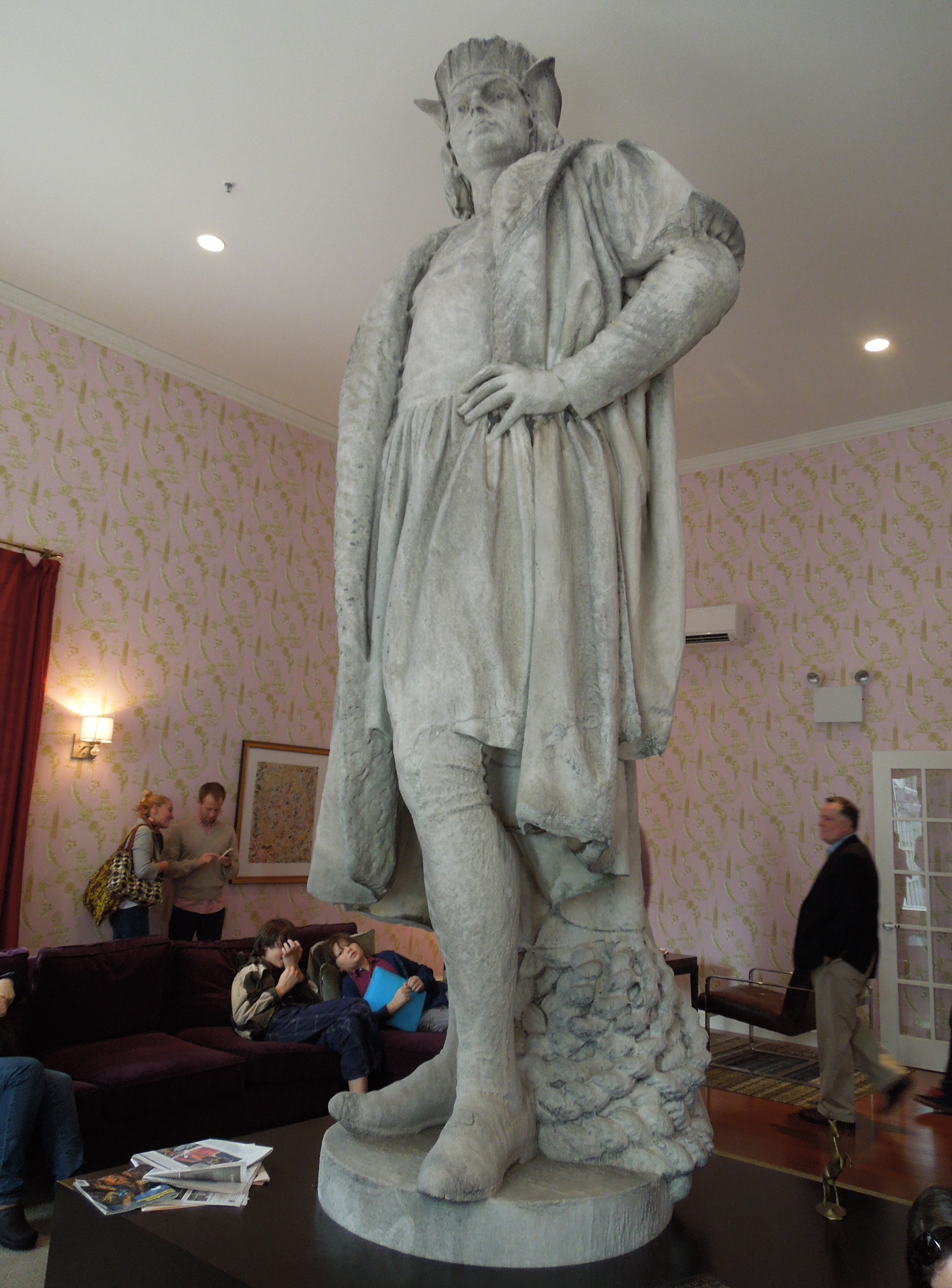
Discovering Columbus, 2012

The 2012 project Villa Cheminée featured a small hotel placed on top of a replica of a power station tower in Cordemais, France. As of 2018, the artwork continued to be operated as a hotel, being available for rental at the rate of 119 Euros per night.

In Ghent, Belgium in 2012, he built an elevated hotel room around the clock tower of the Sint-Pieters railway station. Guests of the hotel stayed in a room where the all four enormous faces of the clock were the centerpiece.

His first project in the United States was Discovering Columbus, a penthouse apartment surrounding Gaetano Russo's statue of Christopher Columbus in Columbus Circle, Manhattan executed in 2012. For "Discovering Columbus", Nishi designed the living room with numerous pop references to American cultural symbols. While the project was highly successful in terms of attendance, it was also controversial, with some members of the Italian-American community claiming that the artwork disparaged Columbus.

According to an interview with Singapore Journal of Legal Studies, he wanted to change people perspectives of the world. He stated, "I noticed a lot of public sculptures in New York City are set on a low base, or even without a base, on the ground, compared to the ones in Europe. And I noticed that Columbus is really in a high position. That's what attracted me. By raising up people's eyes, you can see things with a different perspective. That's the important point of it."

=== 2014 ===
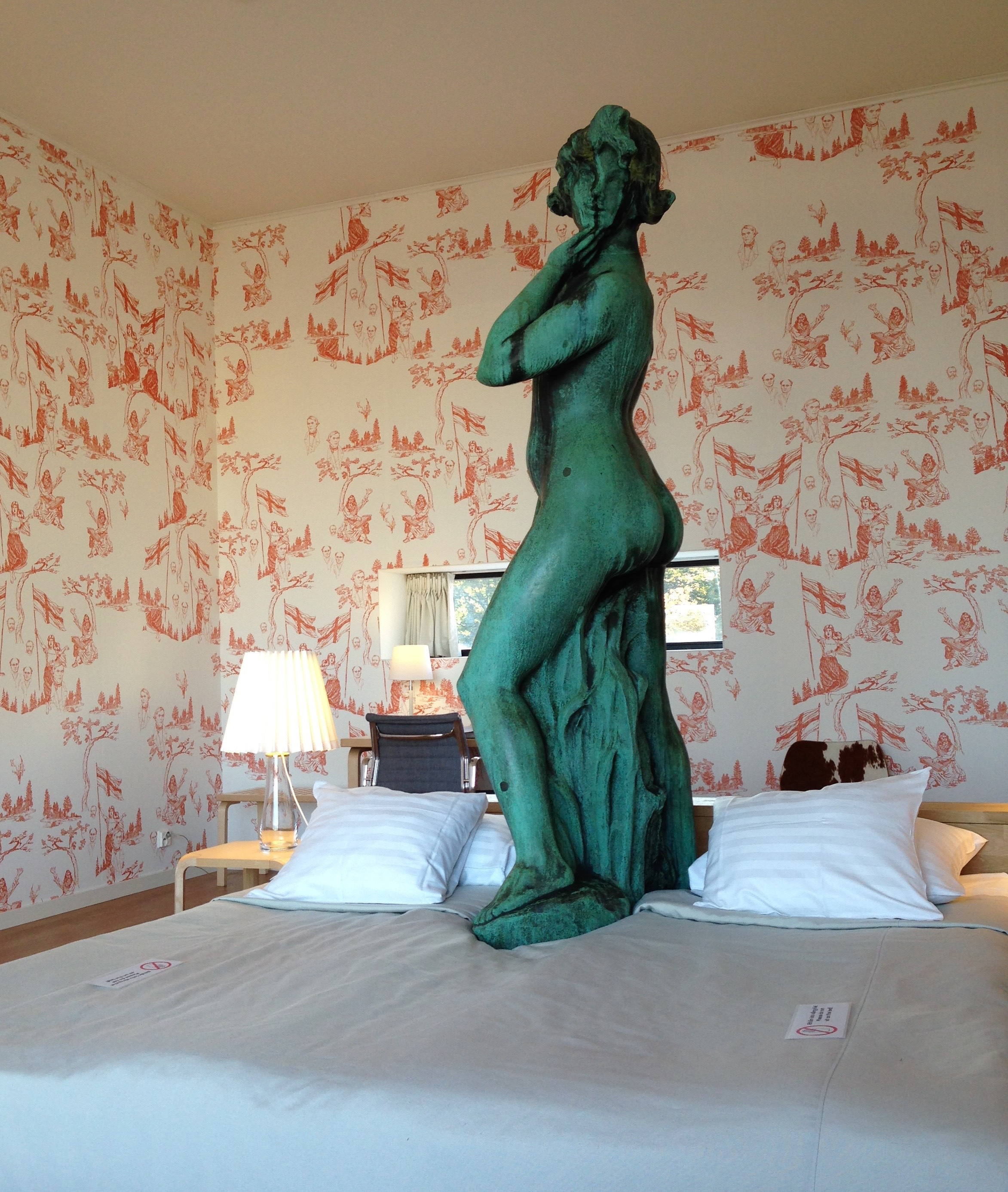
Hotel Manta, 2014

In 2014 Nishi constructed a temporary hotel installation called Hotel Manta around the Havis Amanda fountain in Helsinki's Market Square, Helsinki.

=== 2015 ===
In 2015, Nishi built a viewing platform on top of the Oude Kerk cathedral in Amsterdam that gave a wide view of the city to viewers who climbed to it. The work, titled The Garden Which is the Nearest to God was created under the artist name "Taturo Atzu".

Nishi's 2015 public sculpture The Life’s Little Worries of Général Mellinet in Nantes, France placed a series of household objects, including a piano, a bed, a chair, a coat rack, a heater, a bathroom sink and a stack of books, above the head of the statue of general Émile Mellinet in the Général-Mellinet park.

=== 2016 ===
Nishi's 2016 work In Bed with Martin Luther consisted of a room constructed around an existing bronze statue of Martin Luther in Eisenach, Germany.

=== 2017 ===
During the 2017 Bi-City Biennale in Shenzhen, China, Nishi constructed a part of a roadway in the third-floor worker's dormitory of a former factory.

=== 2018 ===
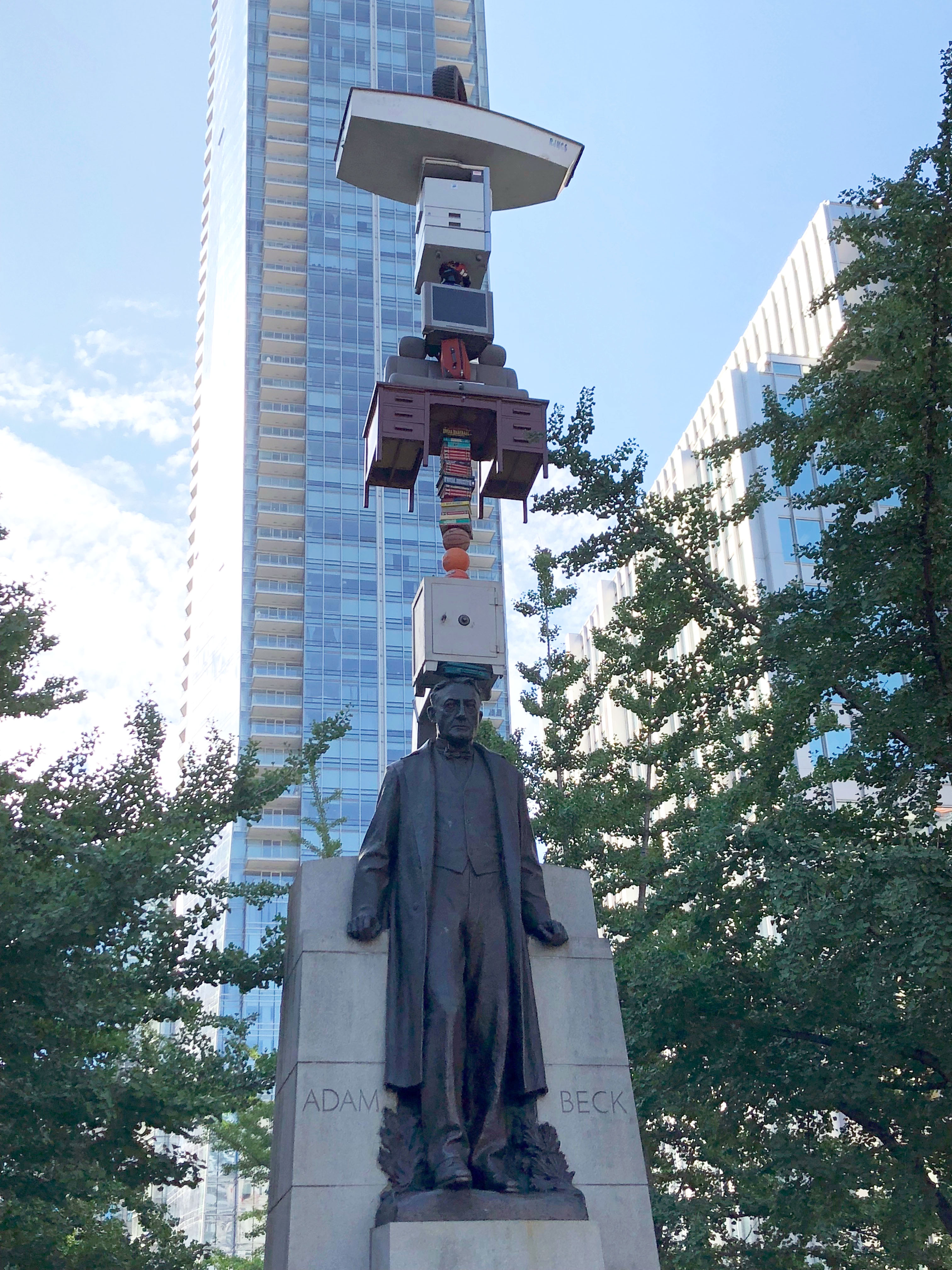
Life's Little Worries of Sir Adam Beck, 2018 installation in Toronto, Ontario by Tatzu Nishi.

Nishi's 2018 Vase of an Anti-Aircraft Gun project in Taiwan involved the construction of a self-contained living room atop an anti-aircraft gun that was used during the Second Taiwan Strait Crisis. Within the room, the barrels of the gun become vases for flowers on a table.

At Paris' Palais de Tokyo in 2018, Nishi built and exhibited a life-sized version of a dollhouse, titled Maison de poupée, which viewers could enter and explore.

In the 2018 project Life's Little Worries of Sir Adam Beck, he stacked household objects including a tire, a photocopier, a dinghy and a safe on the head of a sculpture of Sir Adam Beck in Toronto, Ontario.

=== 2020 ===
Tatzu Nishi was invited to SIAF 2020 (The Sapporo International Art Festival), given the idea of creating an installation that alternates between vehicles and the living space of a home called Tunnel of Daily Life. However the festival was suspended, so he exhibited this artwork in Expo’70 50th Anniversary Exhibition.

== Pseudonyms ==
Nishi often adopts different pseudonyms while working on particular art projects; he has used names like Tatzu Oozu, Tazro Niscino (his birth name), Tatsurou Bashi, and Taturo Atzu, in addition to Tatzu Nishi. For his project at the Palais de Tokyo in Paris in 2018, he authored the artwork under the name Amabouz Taturo.

== Permanent collections ==
Nishi's works are included in the permanent collections of:

- the Nissan Art Award Collection
- the Takahashi Collection
- the Takamatsu City Museum of Art

== Other projects ==
- Reihe, 2002, Berlin
- Untitled, 2009, Hamburg
- Heroe, 2010, Guatemala City
- Eien ni Tsuzukuwake ga Nai (It can't go on forever), 2023, Okaka
