= 1615 in literature =

This article contains information about the literary events and publications of 1615.

== Events ==
- January 6 – Mercury Vindicated from the Alchemists, a masque written by Ben Jonson and designed by Inigo Jones, is performed at Whitehall Palace in London.
- January 13 – William Browne's masque Circe and Ulysses is staged at the Inner Temple in London.
- January 23 – English poet John Donne becomes an ordained minister in the Church of England.
- March 7–11 – King James I of England and Prince Charles visit the University of Cambridge, the first royal visit there since the progress of Queen Elizabeth I in 1564. The university stages entertainments that include performances in Latin of Cecil's Aemilia (March 7), Ruggle's farce Ignoramus (March 8), Tomkis's comedy Albumazar (March 9), and Brooke's Melanthe (March 10). The royals leave Cambridge prior to the première of Fletcher's Sicelides, a Piscatory (March 13). King James enjoys Ignoramus so much that he returns to Cambridge in May to see it again.
- Easter – Persian Safavid hordes led by Shah Abbas the Great kill all the monks at the David Gareja monastery complex in Georgia and set fire to its collection of manuscripts and works of art.
- In England, George Abbot, Archbishop of Canterbury, imposes a year's imprisonment for publishing Bibles without including the Apocrypha.
- Pierre Dupuy is commissioned by Mathieu Molé, first president of the parlement of Paris, to draw up an inventory of the documents known as the Trésor des diaries.
- The Chinese dictionary Zihui (字彙/字汇), edited by Mei Yingzuo (梅膺祚|梅膺祚), is published, introducing the Kangxi radicals in Chinese characters.

== New books ==
=== Prose ===
- Johannes Valentinus Andreae – Confessio oder Bekenntnis der Societät und Bruderschaft Rosenkreuz
- William Camden – Annales Rerum Gestarum Angliae et Hiberniae Regnate Elizabetha, Part 1
- Miguel de Cervantes – Don Quixote, Part 2
- Gervase Markham – The English Huswife, Containing the Inward and Outward Virtues Which Ought to Be in a Complete Woman
- Antoine de Montchrestien – Traité de l'économie politique
- Felipe Guaman Poma de Ayala – El primer nueva corónica y buen gobierno (approximate date of completion of manuscript)
- Matteo Ricci (died 1610) and Nicolas Trigault – De Christiana expeditione apud Sinas
- Vincenzo Scamozzi - L'idea dell'architettura universale
- Joseph Swetnam – The Arraignment of Lewd, Idle, Froward, and Unconstant Women

=== Drama ===
- "R. A., Gent." (Robert Anton, Robert Aylett or Robert Armin?) – The Valiant Welshman, or the true Chronicle History of the Life and Valiant Deedes of Caradoc the Great, King of Cambria (published)
- Samuel Brooke – Melanthe
- William Browne – Circe and Ulysses
- Edward Cecil – Aemilia
- Tirso de Molina – Don Gil de las calzas verdes
- Lope de Vega
  - La malcasada
  - Santiago el verde
- Phineas Fletcher – Sicelides
- Thomas Heywood – The Four Prentices of London (published)
- Ben Jonson – Mercury Vindicated from the Alchemists
- Anthony Munday – Metropolis Coronata
- George Ruggle – Ignoramus
- Thomas Tomkis – Albumazar

=== Poetry ===
- Lope de Vega – La Arcadia

== Births ==
- March 23 – Ferrante Pallavicino, Italian satirist (died 1644)
- June/July – Salvator Rosa, Italian painter and poet (died 1673)
- November 12 – Richard Baxter, English non-conformist leader and religious writer (died 1691)
- November 22 – Gabriel Cossart, French historian (died 1674)
- Unknown dates
  - Laurence Clarkson, English theologian and pamphleteer (died 1667)
  - Adam Gdacjusz, Polish writer and preacher (died 1688)
  - Tanneguy Le Fèvre, French classicist (died 1672)
- Probable year of birth – Sir John Denham, Irish poet (died 1669)

== Deaths ==
- February 4 – Giambattista della Porta, Italian polymath (born c. 1535)
- July 10 – Henry Neville, English diplomat, proposed author of some Shakespeare plays (born 1562)
- August – Arthur Agarde, English antiquary (born 1540)
- September 1 – Étienne Pasquier, French historian (born 1529)
- November – Robert Armin, English actor and dramatist (born c. 1563)
- Unknown date – Gabriel Lobo Lasso de la Vega, Castilian poet, dramatist and historian (born 1555)
