= Technogamia =

1618 play by Barten Holyday

Technogamia, or the Marriages of the Arts is a Jacobean era stage play, an allegory written by Barten Holyday that was first performed and published in 1618.

== Performances ==
Technogamia was first staged on 13 February 1618 by the students of Christ Church, Oxford in Christ Church Hall. An academic play as opposed to the popular theatre of the time, Technogamia was a significant instance in the move away from the Latin language to English in academic drama – an evolution that was ongoing in its era, as marked by plays like Lingua, Albumazar, and Pathomachia.

Technogamia was revived for a Court performance on 26 August 1621, when it was staged for King James I at Woodstock Palace. James did not enjoy the performance, however, and more than once was ready to walk out, though he was prevailed upon to stay to the end for the sake of the young actors. This lack of success provoked some mockery; Barten Holyday earned the nickname "half Holyday," and satirical poems on the matter circulated in both universities. (Verses on the subject by Peter Heylin are most often cited in the critical literature.)

(James, who hated smoking and wrote A Counterblaste to Tobacco, could not have been pleased that the play included a song in praise of the habit. It begins,

Tobacco's a musician,
And in the pipe delighteth,
It descends in a close
Through the organs of the nose
With a relish that inviteth...

— and continues in the same vein, comparing tobacco to a lawyer, a physician, a traveller, a critic and other figures.)

== Publication ==
The play was published in 1618, in a quarto printed by William Stansby for the bookseller John Parker. A second quarto was issued in 1630, printed by John Haviland for Richard Meighen.

== Genre ==
The allegorical form, so extensively employed in Medieval literature, was decidedly old-fashioned by the early 17th century; yet a few writers were still exploiting its potentials in the early Stuart era. In addition to Thomas Tomkis's Lingua, and Pathomachia (probably also by Tomkis), cited above, a list of allegorical plays from Holyday's period could include Nabbes's Microcosmus, Randolph's The Muses' Looking Glass, and William Strode's The Floating Island.

In Technogamia, Holyday attempts to apply the hoary old form of allegory in what was, for his generation, a rather "modern" way. One of the play's primary themes is the defence of Geometres and Astronomia against Magus and his spouse Astrologia – a defence of the emerging scientific world view against the superstitions of prior historical ages.

== The allegory ==
Holyday's lengthy and detailed allegory is concerned with the relationships among the arts and sciences of his era, all of which are personified in fashions typical of the allegorical form. The abstractions include:

- Physica and her daughter Astronomia
- Ethicus and his wife Economa
- Polites the magistrate
- the traveller Geographicus and his servant Phantastes
- Logicus and his servant Phegmaticus
- Grammaticus the schoolmaster and Choler his usher
- Medicus and his servant Sanguis
- Poeta and his servant Melancholico

— plus Arithmetica, Geometres, Musica, Historia, and others. Among the play's villains are the above-mentioned Magus and Astrologia, plus Ceiromantes (from chiromancy or palmistry) and Physiognomus (from physiognomy), two gypsy cheats. The characters' names and the disciplines they represent are for the most part self-evident – though some of the servants derive from the traditional theory of the Four Temperaments.

Astronomia is the play's heroine, pursued in different ways by Poeta, Geographicus, and Geometres. But Historia longs to unite with Poeta; Grammaticus pursues Rhetorica, though she prefers Logicus. Amid a confusion of cross purposes, the figures seek out allies in their amorous quests: Poeta is naturally aided by the Muses, while Magus backs Geometres, and Polites helps Geographicus while struggling to maintain peace and order. The Gypsies pick Poeta's pockets, though they gain nothing but copies of Anacreon and Horace. They are punished for their crime with branding – predictably enough, Physiognomus is branded on the face, and Ceiromantes on the hand. Magus and Astrologia are banished from the community of the sciences after they try to strangle Astronomia. Some couples are united: Geographicus marries Astronomia (and fires his servant Phantastes); Melancholico marries Musica (and Phantastes gets a job in their household). The cold-hearted Logicus remains a bachelor and becomes Polites' assistant, and order is restored to the sciences once again.

The figures were lavishly costumed, as the text specifies. [See Lingua for comparable lushness in costuming.] Astronomia is outfitted in "white gloves and pumps, an azure gown, and a mantle seeded with stars; on her head a tiara, bearing on the front seven stars, and behind stars promiscuously; on the right side, the sun; on the left, the moon." Sanguis is dressed appropriately in red; on the front of his suit is pictured a man with a bleeding nose, and on the back an image of bloodletting from an arm. The tobacco-loving Phlegmaticus wears a "pale russet suit" adorned with tobacco pipes and paraphernalia and a can of drink (not an anachronism: there were "cans", or "cannikins," of beer at the time).

== Critical responses ==
Holyday's text is rich and dense with contemporary allusions and references. Scholars, critics, and commentators have exploited its particular features for insight on literary questions, word usage, Jacobean customs...even the development of cartography and advertising.
