= Pathomachia =

Pathomachia, or the Battle of Affections, also known as Love's Lodestone, is an early 17th-century play, first printed in 1630. It is an allegory that presents a range of problems to scholars of the drama of the Jacobean and Caroline eras.

== Date and publication ==
The play was licensed for publication by Sir Henry Herbert, the Master of the Revels, on 16 April 1630 and was published later that year, in a quarto printed by the brothers Richard and Thomas Cotes for the bookseller Francis Constable. Constable dedicated the work to Henry Carey, 4th Baron Hunsdon and 1st Earl of Dover. In his dedication, Constable repeats the statement of the title page, that the author is deceased.

The full title of the play in the 1630 quarto is Pathomachia or the Battle of Affections, Shadowed by a Feigned Siege of the City of Pathopolis. The title page also states that the play was "Written some years since" by the late author and is now issued by one of his friends. The play's running title, which appears at the top of the pages of text, is Love's Lodestone. A University play by that name was staged c. 1616; the implication is that the Pathomachia of 1630 is the same work as the Love's Lodestone of c. 1616.

The play also exists in two manuscript texts; one is part of MS. Harl. 6869 Art. 1 in the collection of the British Library, and the other is MS. Eng. poet. e. 5 in the collection in the Bodleian Library. Pathomachia shares the Harleian MS. with another allegorical play, titled The Fallacies, or the Troubles of Hermenia, which is dated 1631 and ascribed to Richard Zouch. The Harleian MS. text of Pathomachia contains variant readings and some material absent from the printed text, but is missing its last seventeen or so lines.

== Authorship ==
There is no external evidence of the author's identity. One 19th-century commentator, misreading Francis Kirkman's 1661 play list, assigned the play to Anthony Brewer, an attribution for which there is no sound justification. An attempt to assign the play to John Marston has been rejected by the scholarly consensus. Attempts to assign the play to the Cambridge Platonist philosopher Henry More are problematical chronologically, since More was born in 1614. (He might have written Pathomachia in his mid-teens, but he couldn't have written Love's Lodestone at the age of two.) The blind academic Ambrose Fisher (died 1617) has also been suggested as a candidate.

Perhaps the strongest case has been made for Thomas Tomkis as the author of Pathomachia; the play shares obvious commonalities with Tomkis's Lingua (1607). In fact Pathomachia contains two direct references to "Madame Lingua," and shows a range of similarities with Tomkis's play. Tomkis was an academic playwright; his Albumazar (1615) was acted at Cambridge University.

== Genre ==
Composed in prose rather than verse, Pathomachia relies heavily on the tradition of allegory and the morality play; its characters are personifications of the human passions, Love, Hatred, Pride, Malice, Envy, Curiosity, etc. The play treats Love and Hatred as the King and Queen of the country of the emotions; but the royal figures have neglected their duties and a rebellion has sprung up among their subjects. The vices masquerade as virtues, until they are suppressed and brought to order by Justice. In fact there is no action in the play, which consists of three acts of dialogue among the personifications.

(Pathomachia strongly resembles closet drama, and many critics would probably classify it as such; though if it was acted on stage as Love's Lodestone it would not qualify as a literal instance of closet drama.)

The text is rich with classical allusions and cultural references. In the opening scene of Act II, for example, Justice tells Love that Heroical Virtue "is gone to the Antipodes, unto Japonia" [that is, Japan] and that "I have not heard of him since the time of Judas Maccabeus...." The drama also displays many references to then-recent historical events, including the Gunpowder Plot and François Ravaillac's assassination of Henri IV among others. (These contemporaneous references are consistent with a date of authorship c. 1616; none of them are to events of the 1620s that would contradict that dating.) The one passage in the play most often cited in the critical literature is probably the catalogue of torture devices in Act III, scene iv: "the Russian Shiners, the Scottish Boots, the Dutch Wheel, the Spanish strappado, linen ball, and pearl of confession shall torment thee...," etc.

Despite the play's references to contemporary events, it gives no sense that it is in any way a commentary on the specific English political situation of its time. It is hard to see how either set of English rulers in its era — King James I and Queen Anne, or King Charles I and Queen Henrietta Maria — could be allegorised as Love and Hatred.

Though the morality-play genre was definitely old-fashioned by 1630, it had not yet died out entirely. Apart from the earlier Lingua, Pathomachia can be classed with a roster of similar plays in its generation, including Dekker and Ford's The Sun's Darling, Nabbes's Microcosmus, Randolph's The Muses' Looking Glass, Barten Holyday's Technogamia, and William Strode's The Floating Island, among others.

In the view of one critic, Pathomachia has "a significance for the historian of ethics and psychological theory."
