= George Eld =

English printer (died 1624)

George Eld (died 1624) was a London printer of the Jacobean era, who produced important works of English Renaissance drama and literature, including key texts by William Shakespeare, Ben Jonson, Christopher Marlowe, and Thomas Middleton.

Eld was the son of a carpenter from Derbyshire. He served an eight-year apprenticeship to bookseller Robert Bolton, starting in 1592, and became a "freeman" (a full member) of the Stationers Company on 13 January 1600. He established himself in his own printing business in 1604, at the sign of the White Horse in Fleet Lane, by marrying the widow of not one but two master printers. His shop featured two or perhaps three presses, and four compositors – a substantial operation for the time. Eld entered into a partnership with Miles Fletcher in 1617; Fletcher took over the business after Eld died of plague in 1624.

== Printer ==
In Eld's historical era, most stationers concentrated on either printing or bookselling; and most publishing was done by the booksellers, who commissioned the printers to print their works. Eld was primarily a printer during his career, working on specific projects for specific booksellers.

In his two-decade career, Eld printed a wide variety of works; when the printer is identified on title pages only with initials, researchers have used Eld's characteristic title-page device, "two volutes with foliage," for supporting evidence. He is the "G. E." who printed William Camden's Remains of a Greater Work (1605) for Simon Waterson, John Selden's The Duello (1610) for John Helme, and Peter Gosselin's The State Mysteries of the Jesuits (1623) for Nicholas Bourne.

=== Thorpe ===
Eld worked regularly for Thomas Thorpe; the two produced more than twenty titles together. These included the first quartos of Jonson's Sejanus (1605), Volpone (1606), and The Masque of Blackness and The Masque of Beauty (in one volume, 1608). They also issued John Marston's What You Will (1607), and George Chapman's All Fools (1605) and The Conspiracy and Tragedy of Charles, Duke of Byron (1608).

Thorpe and Eld were also involved in two "dubious publishing enterprises" – one, a failed attempt to print a work to which they did not have the rights, and the other, a successful such attempt of some work by Thomas Coryat.

=== Shakespeare ===
Thorpe and Eld's most significant project was the 1609 first edition of Shakespeare's Sonnets. In 1612, Thorpe and Eld also issued a work of modern Shakespearean controversy, the Funeral Elegy that Donald Foster proposed as a work by Shakespeare, without convincing most scholars and critics.

More Shakespeare: Eld printed the 1609 quarto of Troilus and Cressida, for Richard Bonian and Henry Walley. Some critics have complained that the text in this volume is so poor that it should be classed as a "bad quarto;" how much blame for this should fall on Eld, and how much is due to a faulty manuscript source that Eld had to work with, is open to question. (Eld's Sejanus text, in contrast, is excellently printed.) Eld has also been identified as the printer of John Smethwick's third quarto of Hamlet (1611 in literature).

=== Others ===
Eld also printed the 1609 second quarto of Marlowe's Doctor Faustus for John Wright. And for William Aspley, he printed one of the most controversial plays of the period, Eastward Ho (three editions, 1605).

Eld printed first editions of a range of other texts in Jacobean drama:

- Samuel Daniel's The Queen's Arcadia (1606), for publisher Simon Waterson.
- The anonymous Return from Parnassus (1606), for John Wright.
- The anonymous Caesar's Revenge (1606), also for John Wright.
- Barnabe Barnes's The Devil's Charter (1607), again for John Wright.
- Day, Rowley, and Wilkins's The Travels of the Three English Brothers (1607), once again for Wright.
- Thomas Tomkis's Lingua (1607), for Simon Waterson.
- Lording Barry's Ram Alley (1611), for Robert Wilson.
- Chapman's The Memorable Masque of the Middle Temple and Lincoln's Inn (1613), for George Norton.
- Nathan Field's Amends for Ladies (1618), for Matthew Walbancke.

== Publisher ==
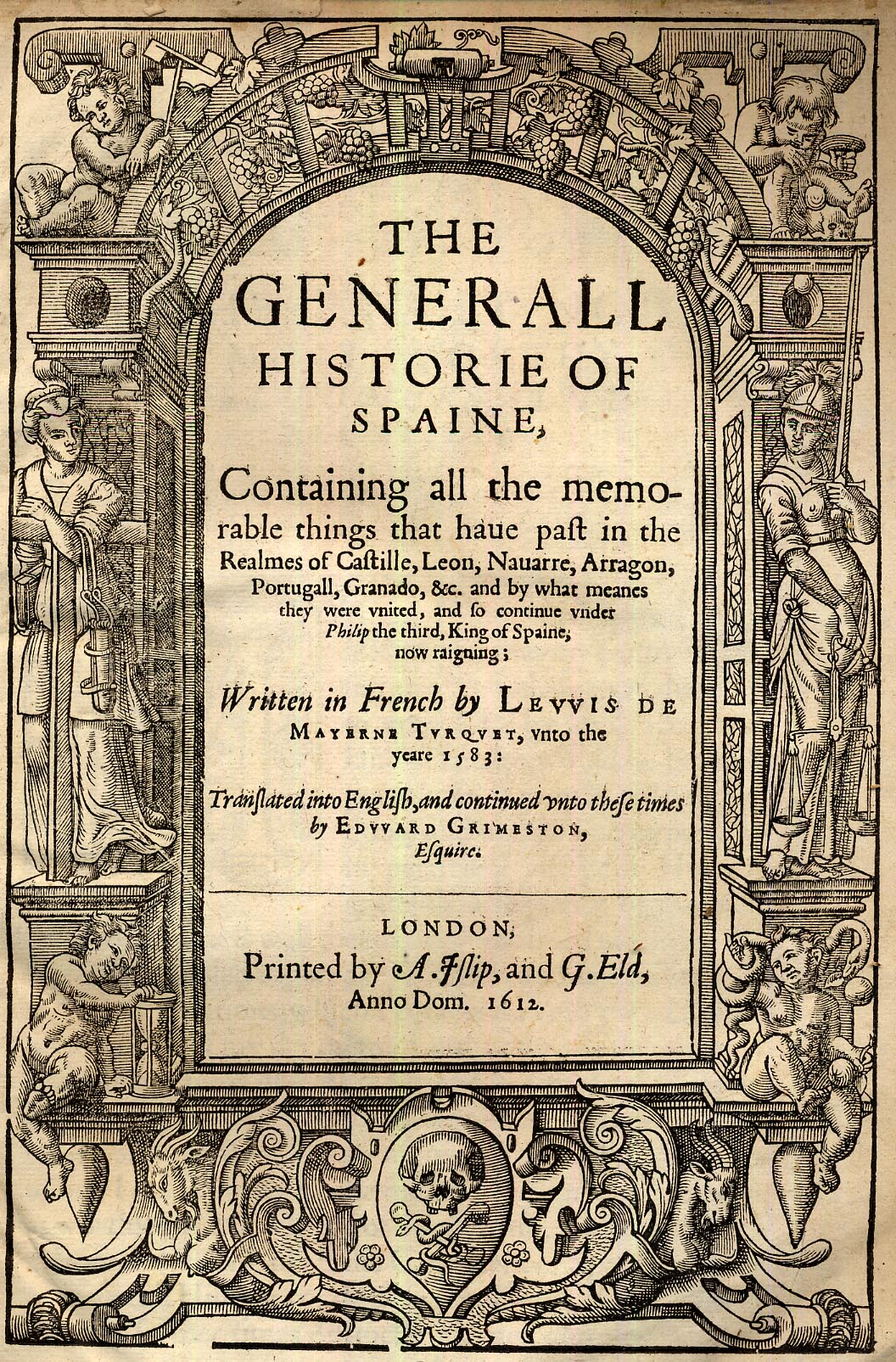
Titlepage of Edward Grimeston's The Generall Historie of Spaine, 1612.

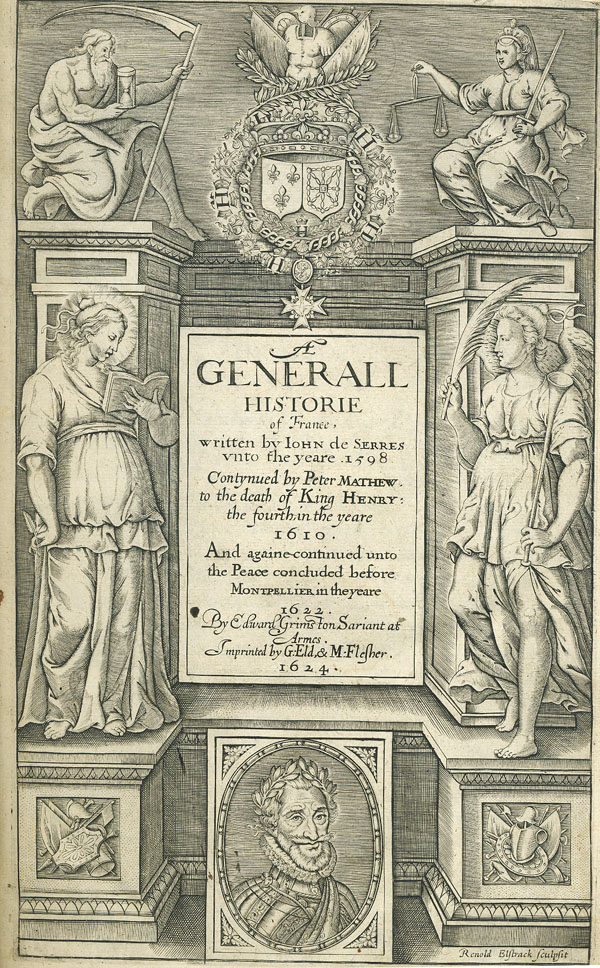
Titlepage of Edward Grimeston's A Generall Historie of France, 1624.

Like some printers of his generation – Richard Field is a good example – Eld also published work on his own authority. He was active in drama here too:

- Eld printed and published both Q1 and Q2 of The Revenger's Tragedy (1607 and 1608). The play is now generally attributed to Middleton.
- Also, Middleton's A Trick to Catch the Old One, again the first two quartos (both 1608). A printer who published usually had to arrange for a bookseller to sell the work in question; the title page of Q2 of A Trick specifies that the book is to be "sold by Henry Rocket." Yet when the third edition of A Trick appeared in 1616, Eld was no longer the publisher; he merely printed the volume for bookseller Thomas Langley.
- The Puritan, one of the plays of the Shakespeare Apocrypha, was published by Eld in 1607. Another play now generally assigned to Middleton, Eld attributed it to "W. S."
- Eld published Northward Ho, by Thomas Dekker and John Webster, in 1607.

Eld published beyond the confines of Jacobean drama as well, with works like John Healey's 1610 translation of The City of God by St. Augustine. (That volume bore a dedication to William Herbert, 3rd Earl of Pembroke, signed by Thorpe.) In 1622 he issued a volume of satires by John Taylor the Water Poet called The Water Cormorant His Complaint. He published the types of religious books that were so common in his era, like Bishop Gervase Babington's Works, Containing Comfortable Notes on the Five Books of Moses (1615). And inevitably, Eld published and printed many now-obscure works by forgotten authors. The title page of his 1606 edition of Robert Pricket's Time's Anatomy bears the inscription "to be sold by John Hodgets" – another demonstration of the printer/publisher's need for a retail outlet for his products.

=== Grimeston ===
In 1607, Eld printed and published Edward Grimeston's A General Inventory of the History of France, the book that provided Chapman source material for his tragedies on then-recent French history (including the Byron plays cited above). Eld followed this with several other large histories by Grimeston, partnering with fellow stationers Adam Islip, M. Flesher, and William Stansby: A General History of the Netherlands (A. Islip and G. Eld, 1609), The General History of Spain (A. Islip and G. Eld, 1612), The General History of the Magnificent State of Venice (G. Eld and W. Stansby, 1612), and A General History of France (G. Eld and M. Flesher, 1624).
