= Edward Grimeston =

English sergeant-at-arms

Edward Grimeston (died 1640) was an English sergeant-at-arms and one of the most active translators of his day.

== Life ==
He was sworn in as sergeant-at-arms to assist the Speaker in the Parliament of England on 17 March 1609/10. He married a daughter of Armiger Strettly. He had a son, Edward, and Sir Harbottle Grimston was his nephew. He was buried in St. Margaret's, Westminster, on 14 December 1640.

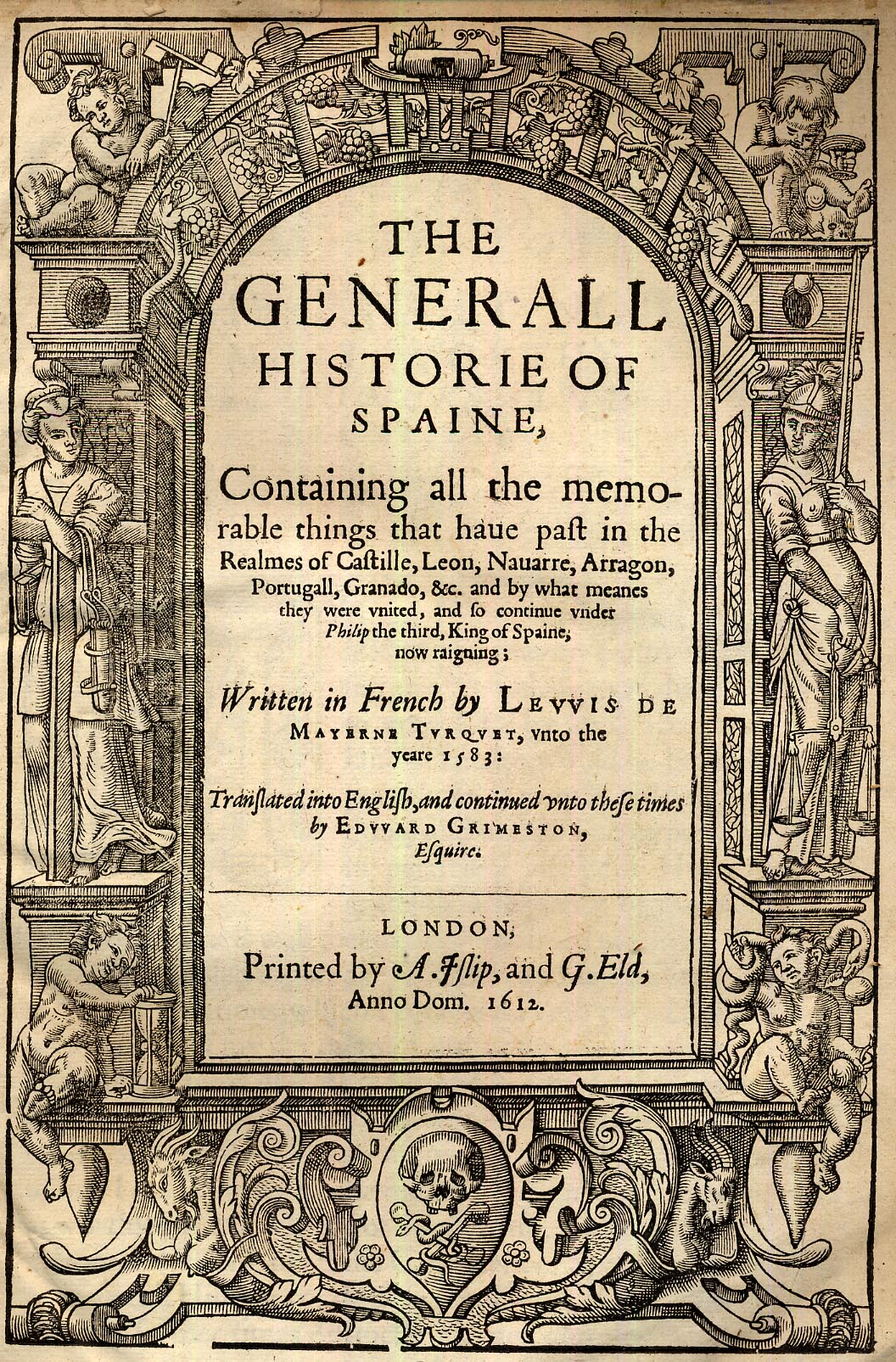
Titlepage of Edward Grimeston's The Generall Historie of Spaine, 1612.

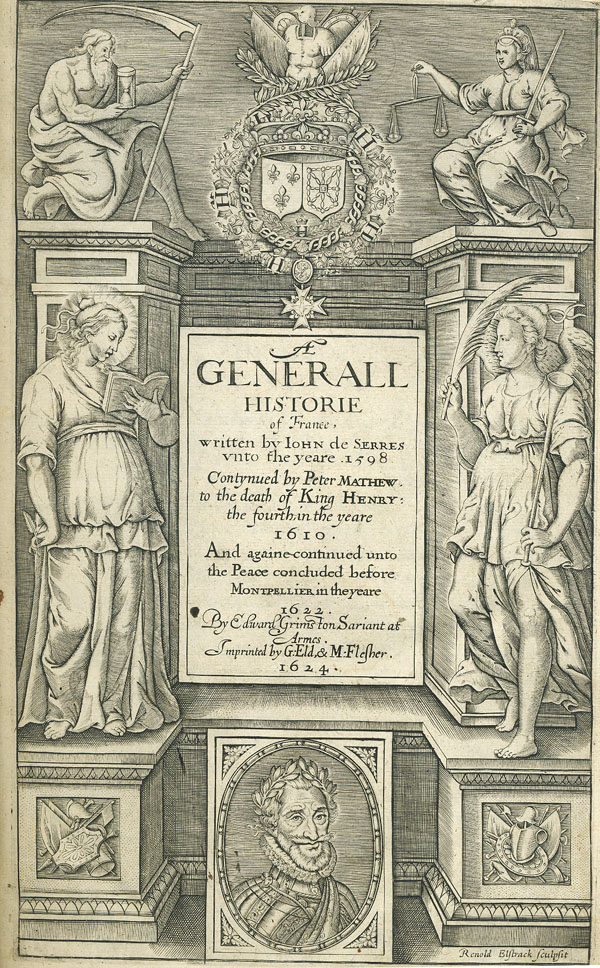
Titlepage of Edward Grimeston's A Generall Historie of France, 1624.

== Works ==
Edward Grimestone published several large and influential histories, dedicating them to Sir Robert Cecil, 1st Earl of Salisbury, and Thomas Howard, 1st Earl of Suffolk. George Eld printed and published Grimestone's A General Inventory of the History of France (1607), and in conjunction with stationers Adam Islip, M. Flesher, and William Stansby, Grimestone's A General History of the Netherlands (A. Islip and G. Eld, 1609), The General History of Spain (A. Islip and G. Eld, 1612), The General History of the Magnificent State of Venice (G. Eld and W. Stansby, 1612), and A General History of France (G. Eld and M. Flesher, 1624).

Grimestone's histories were used for source material by several well-known seventeenth-century playwrights. The General History of Spain (1612) was likely the source for Philip Massinger's Believe as You List, and A General Inventory of the History of France (1607) was the primary source for George Chapman's Bussy D'Ambois, The Revenge of Bussy D'Ambois, and The Conspiracy and Tragedy of Charles, Duke of Byron.

Grimestone also published The Honest Man, or The Art to Please in Court (1632), a translation of a French courtly conduct manual by Nicolas Faret, L’Honneste Homme. Ov l’Art de plaire a la court (1630). The Honest Man offers advice to the would-be courtier or gentleman along the lines of Baldassare Castiglione's The Book of the Courtier (Il libro del Cortegiano, 1528). Grimestone dedicated the book to Richard Hubert, the courtier and groom porter to Charles I of England.

== Works/translations ==
- A True History of the Memorable Siege of Ostend from anonymous French original (1604)
- The naturall and morall historie of the East and West Indies by José de Acosta (1604)
- A General Inventory of the History of France (1607)
- Admirable and Memorable Histories by Simon Goulart (1607)
- A General History of the Netherlands by Jean-François le Petit (1608, 1609)
- The Low-Country Commonwealth by Jean-François le Petit (1609)
- A General History of France – second edition – (1611)
- The Heroic Life and Deplorable Death of the Most Christian King Henry the Fourth by Pierre Mathieu (1611)
- The General History of Spain by Louis de Mayerne Turquet (1612)
- The History of Louis [Lewis by Pierre Mathieu (1614)
- The Estates, Empires, and Principalities of the World by Pierre d'Avity (1615)
- A Table of Humane Passions by Nicolas Coeffeteau (1621)
- The Imperial History from the First Foundation of the Roman Monarchy to this Present Time by Pedro Mexia (1623)
- A General History of France – third edition – (1624)
- A General History of the Netherlands – second edition – (1627)
- The Honest Man, or The Art to Please in Court by Nicolas Faret (1632)
- The Counsellor of Estate, containing the Greatest and Most Remarkable Considerations serving for the Managing of Public Affairs by Philippe de Béthume (1634)
- The History of Polybius the Megalopolitan by Louis Maigret (1634)
- The History of the Imperial Estate of the Grand Seigneurs by Michel Baudier (1635)
- The History of the Court of the King of China by Michel Baudier (1635)

== Notes ==
Government offices
Preceded by David Cecil	Serjeant-at-Arms of the House of Commons of England; 1610–?	Succeeded by Edward Dendy
