= Coscinomancy =

Type of divination

Coscinomancy is a form of divination utilising a sieve and shears, used in ancient Greece, medieval and early modern Europe and 17th century New England, to determine the guilty party in a criminal offence, find answers to questions, etc.

The term comes into English via both New Latin and Medieval Latin coscinomantia, and is ultimately derived from the Ancient Greek koskinomantis (Greek: κοσκινομάντης) a diviner using a sieve, from koskinon (Greek: κόσκινον) a sieve. The word is mentioned by a number of Ancient Greek writers, including Philippides, Julius Pollux, Lucianus and, most famously, Theocritus.

One method of practising coscinomancy is described by Cornelius Agrippa, best known for his Three Books of Occult Philosophy, 1533. Following the disputed Fourth Book in the same series, a work entitled the Heptameron, or Magical Elements appeared in the first volume of Agrippa's Opera omnia, or Collected Works (circa 1600). The first of two appendices to the Heptameron (chapter xxi) briefly covers many forms of ceremonial magic, including coscinomancy. Agrippa believed that the movement of the sieve was performed by a demon, and that the conjuration Dies, mies, jeschet, benedoefet, dowima, enitemaus actually compelled the demon to perform the task. He further notes that the words of this conjuration were understood neither by the speaker nor anyone else (nec sibi ipsis, nec aliis intellectua). The notion of a powerfully efficacious language of the spirit world is quite common in magic belief. The so-called Enochian language of the 16th century magician Edward Kelley, later revived by Aleister Crowley, is such a language. Kelley believed the Enochian words so powerful that he would communicate them to his cohort, Dr. John Dee, backwards, lest he unleash powers beyond control. This concept can also be seen in The Arabian Nights in which a sorceress takes some lake water in her hand and over it speaks "words not to be understood".

There has been some speculation about the manner in which the sieve was to be held by the shears, with some writers suggesting that a piece of thread was used. In the 1567 edition of Agrippa's works there is a picture showing exactly this. It is clear that the sieve was suspended from the shears in such a way that the cutting edges of the blades made tangents to the outer rim of the sieve. Thus suspended the sieve is capable of some sideways movement, or even of dropping. The sieve was held by the two middle fingers only making it almost impossible to keep the sieve still for any length of time and thus ensuring a prognostication. The complicating factor is that in the Latin text accompanying the picture the sieve is said to "turn around" (circum agatur), which clearly it cannot do unless held at two diametrically opposite points on the outer rim.

Other references to coscinomancy can be found in François Rabelais' Pantagruel (1532: III. xxv.); Johann Weyer's De Praestigiis Daemonum et Incantationibus ac Venificiis (1583: xii.); and Barten Holyday's Technogamia, or the Marriage of the Arts (1618: II. iii. ll. 89-146 (G2v)).
