= The Devil's Charter =

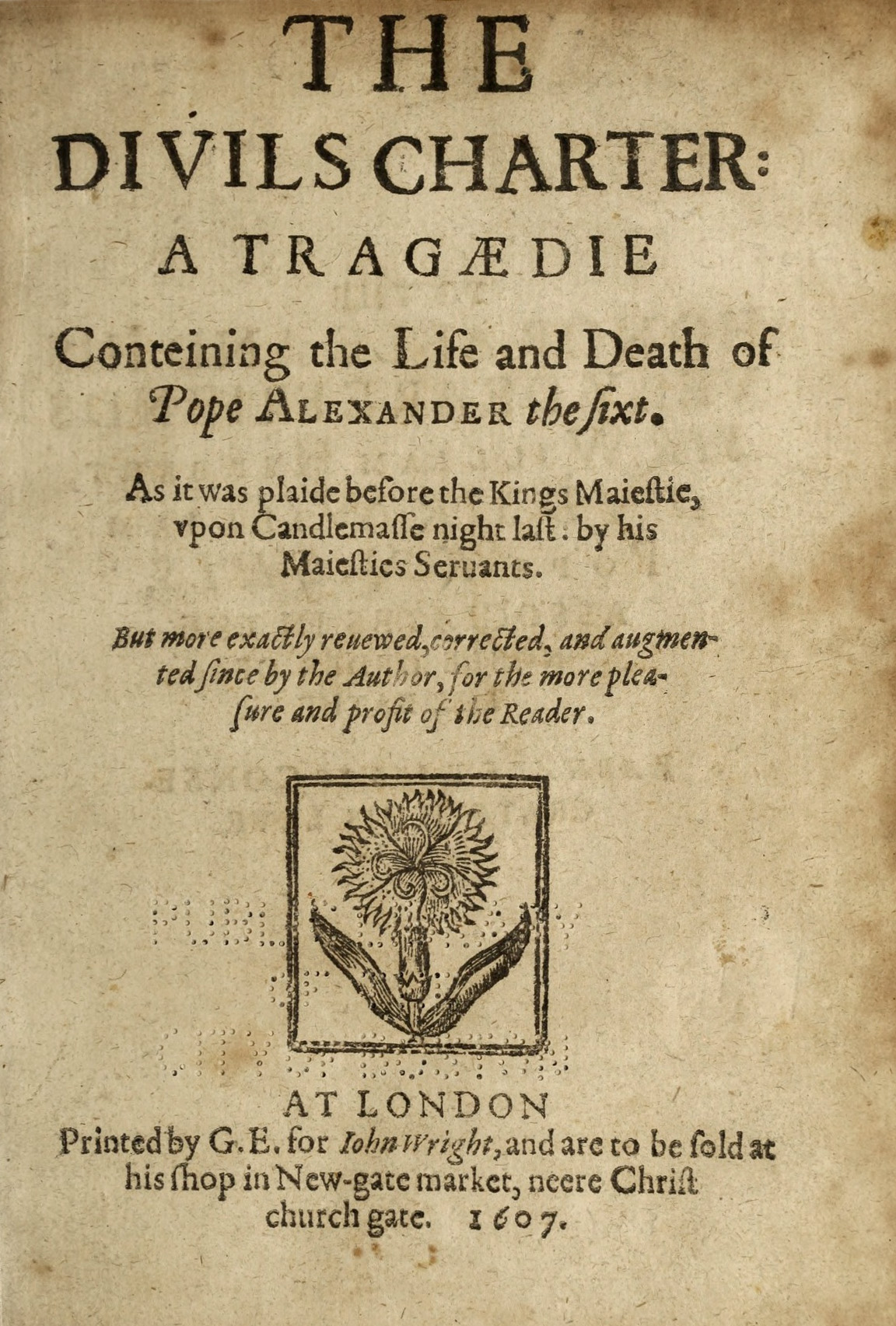
Title page of the first edition of The Devil's Charter (1607).

The Devil's Charter is an early Jacobean era stage play, a tragedy written by Barnabe Barnes. The play recounts the story of Pope Alexander VI.

== Date, performance, publication ==
The Devil's Charter dates from 1607; it was acted by the King's Men at Court before King James I on Candlemas (2 February) of that year. The play was entered into the Stationers' Register on 16 October 1607, and published before the end of the year, in a quarto printed by George Eld for the bookseller John Wright. Barnes dedicated the play to William Pope, 1st Earl of Downe and to William Herbert, 1st Baron Powis. The 1607 quarto is the sole edition of the play prior to the 20th century.

== Plot synopsis ==
The play opens with a dumbshow prologue that shows Roderigo making a deal with the devil to become Pope Alexander VI. Lodowick convinces Charles VIII of France to go to war against Italy on religious grounds. Two gentlemen lambast the pope's corruption. Gismond and Barbarossa intercept some slander against the pope and are both upset, promising to find and punish the writer. The Pope soliloquizes about how he made this deal with the devil for the betterment of his sons, Candy and Caesar. He divides Italy and the surrounding territories between them and gives them each a swath to rule. Caesar and the Pope pontificate about ruling well and fighting wars in the name of religion. Candy leaves to go deal with the ambassador come to make a marriage with the Lady Saunce. Lucretia prepares to murder her husband Gismond for keeping her shut away. They trade barbs about jealousy and virtue. She ties him up, makes him sign a statement that he slandered her, her father the pope, her brothers Caesar and Candy, and also Sforza, and then stabs him many times. She then stages it to look like he killed himself out of regret over locking her up and retires to bed. A servant and Barbarossa discover the body and she feigns shock and grief. She makes a scene and threatens to kill herself as well. The Chorus tells us that King Charles is marching on Italy with about 20000 troops.

Alexander, Caesar, and Candy prepare for battle against King Charles. Alexander and Charles parley and can't come to an agreement—Charles wants to conquer Rome, and Alexander won't yield the Castell Angelo. Charles's companions call Alexander the antichrist and call on Charles to remove him from the throne. Charles and Alexander reach an accord. The Chorus tells us that after this, Charles dies, territory changes hands a couple times, and the rest of the play really only concerns the Pope and Caesar.

The Pope sends a messenger with a ruby to Astor bidding him to come visit. Astor is the Pope's captive for sexual reasons. Astor is insulted by this request. The Pope comes out of a casement to beg/woo Astor to come to him. Astor resists and resists and then excuses himself for mass. The Pope tells his servant to make sure Astor visits after mass because he cannot breathe without him. Caesar hires Frescobaldi, a ruffian, to do some nefarious work. Frescobaldi recites his qualifications, his mettle in battle, etc. Candy suspects that his sister Lucretia murdered her husband Gismond and calls her in for questioning. Frescobaldi sets up his post to do his dirty work. Baglioni stumbles across him and the two become friends. Frescobaldi dismisses Baglioni and gets back to work. Caesar and Frescobaldi trip and stab Candy. Frescobaldi hauls Candy's body up to toss it over the bridge, and Caesar pushes Frescobaldi after. Caesar crows about how no one will suspect his crimes since he's a cardinal. He plots to frame Sforza for the murder and to kill his sister Lucretia next.

The Pope conjures devils to find out who murdered Candy and Gismond, and is horrified when he finds out Caesar and Lucretia are responsible. He vows that they (and Astor) must die. The Pope accuses Caesar of murdering Candy, and Caesar accuses the Pope of incest, murder, sodomy, lust, etc. They both agree to conceal the other's sins in order to keep the status quo. Lucretia puts on poisoned makeup and dies. Caesar lays siege to Countess Katharine of Furli, Sforza's daughter. She refuses to yield and he reveals that he has kidnapped her two sons. She still refuses to yield even to save their lives and Caesar orders their execution. They fight in battle and Katharine is captured. Caesar reveals that her sons are alive and her fortune is intact, and orders the three of them sent to Rome. Barbarossa is instructed to govern Furli without restriction and give the people their liberty. The Pope arranges for Astor and his brother Philippo to be drugged to sleep, then places an asp on both their chests and they die. Other lords suspect foul play.

Caesar discharges his army with good pay and then hires Baglioni to kill Rozzi, an apothecary. Bernardo arrives to collect some powders and poisons from Rozzi. Rozzi sets down his bottles to read a letter. Baglioni drinks from the bottles while he waits to shoot Rozzi. The bottle are poisoned. Bernardo leaves with the potions. Baglioni shoots Rozzi. The Pope and Caesar discuss their plans to poison Cardinal Caraffa at a banquet that night. The Devil arrives at the banquet and plays switcheroo with the poisoned bottles. The Pope and Caesar poison themselves. Caesar stabs Bernardo for the mix up. The Cardinals depart to save themselves. The devils Belchar, Astaroth, and Varca plan to hurry the Pope to hell. The Pope tries to repent and has difficulty accessing his conscience. He retires to his study and finds the Devil there waiting for him. The Pope tries to exorcise the Devil and cannot. They look over the contract he made in exchange for becoming Pope; due to ambiguous punctuation and the use of bare numerals in the Latin text, the Pope misread the term. He believed he was promised eighteen years and eight days (annos 11 et 7, dies 8 post), reading "11 and 7" as eighteen years, but the Devil reveals a syntactical reading, supported by Roman inclusive calendar counting, that limits the contract to exactly eleven years and seven days. They argue over the terms and the Devil tells the Pope to prepare for eternal torment. The Devil shows the Pope the ghosts of stabbed Candy and poisoned Lucretia—the Pope is poisoned in retribution for poisoning Lucretia, while Caesar will be stabbed in retribution for stabbing Candy. A bunch of devils arrive to take the Pope down to hell. Two Cardinals find his corpse and order Rome's bells to be run in Thanksgiving for being delivered from this wicked pope.

== Special features ==
The play is notable among scholars of English Renaissance theatre for its unusually full stage directions, which reveal much about the dramatic style of the leading company of the age — and for the fact that those stage directions specify the play's characters carrying their props onto the stage with them. Since the characters are historical personages (Charles VIII of France, Lodovico Sforza, Cesare Borgia, and Francesco Guicciardini among others), the effect can be odd and striking; at the start of Act I, scene v, Lucrezia Borgia enters carrying a chair, "which she planteth upon the stage." Characters murder other characters, then drag the bodies offstage.

The text of The Devil's Charter is rich with intellectual, historical, and contemporary Jacobean references. It is not accidental that this anti-Catholic play was written and produced in the aftermath of the Gunpowder Plot of 1605; Protestant propagandists found the story of the Borgia family a useful resource. The story was dramatized again by Nathaniel Lee in his Caesar Borgia (1679).

== The devil ==
The Devil in the play's title is literal rather than metaphorical; Alexander conjures up Astaroth to aid him in his climb to power. (Barnes's play reflects the influences of earlier devil plays, notably Marlowe's Doctor Faustus.) The diabolism of the plot provides opportunities for sensationalism, with multiple ghosts, and stage spectacle, as in the conjuring scene IV, i. (The stage directions there give the King's Men some latitude in special effects: Alexander conjures up an infernal king with a red face, who is "riding upon a lion, or dragon.") At the start of V, v, Astaroth calls up two fellow devils, Belchar and Varca; they converse and dance. In the next and concluding scene, Astaroth, wearing the papal robes, surprises Alexander; the pope learns that the devil has planted tricky arithmetic in their written contract, and that his reign is over years sooner than he expected. Amid thunder and lightning, a horde of devils drag Alexander to Hell.
