= A Trick to Catch the Old One =

Jacobean comedy by Thomas Middleton

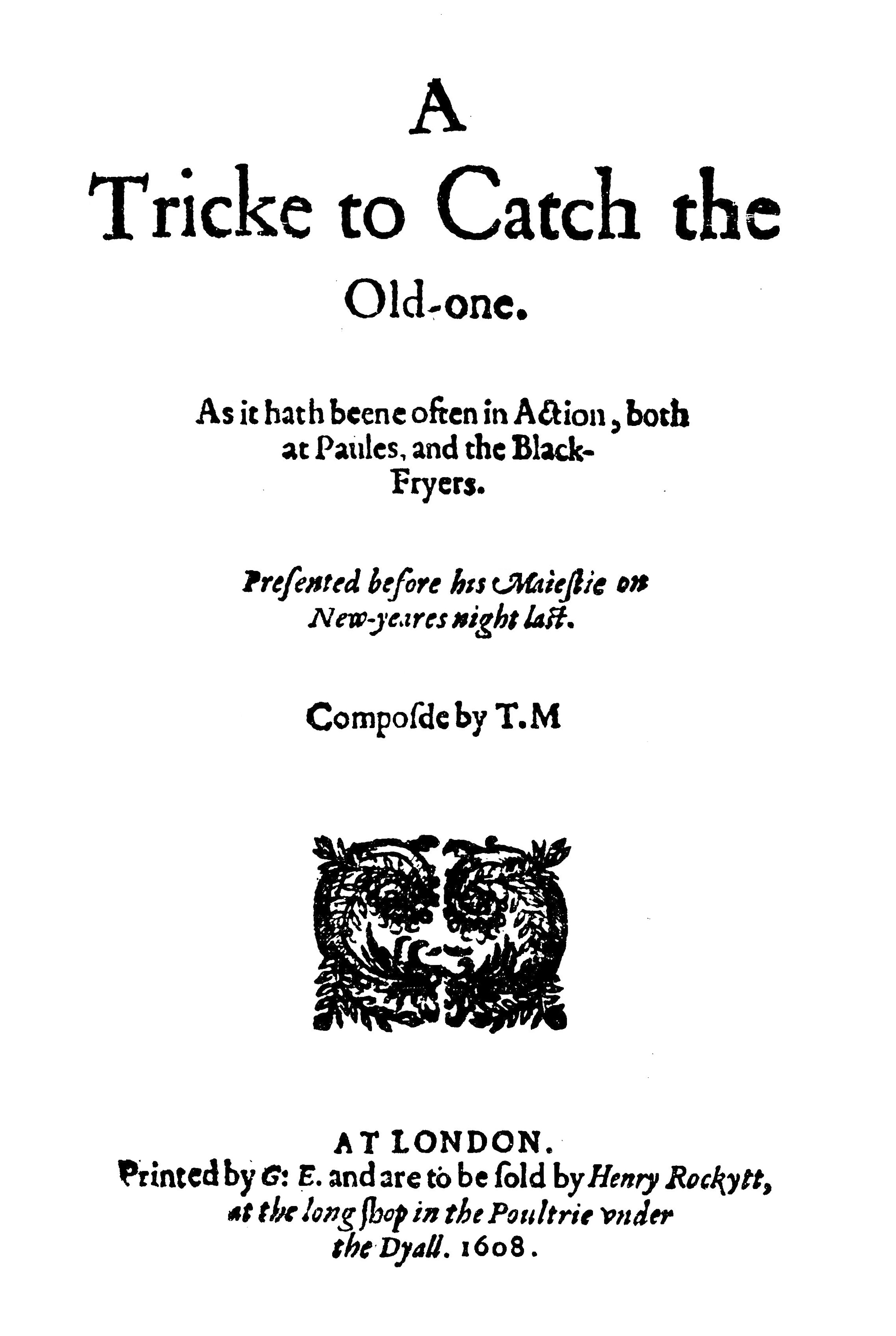
The second title page of the first quarto of A Trick to Catch the Old One

A Trick to Catch the Old One is a Jacobean comedy written by Thomas Middleton, first published in 1608. The play is a satire in the subgenre of city comedy.

== Composition, performance, and printing history ==
A Trick to Catch the Old One was entered into the Stationers' Register, together with The Revenger's Tragedy, now also commonly attributed to Middleton, by the printer George Eld on 7 October 1607. It was published in quarto by Eld in 1608. The first quarto was issued with two different title pages: the first lists Eld himself as the bookseller, but at some point during the printing process the play was apparently acquired by Henry Rocket and the second title page, also dated 1608, lists him as the bookseller. Both title pages state that the play was acted by the Children of Paul's; the second title page also states that it was performed by the Children of the Blackfriars, and that it had been presented before King James I "on New-yeares night last". Chambers and Greg, associating this statement with a record of a performance by the Blackfriars company at court during Christmas of 1608, argued that the New Year's night in question must be 1 January 1609, and various attempts have been made to reconcile that date with the date of 1608 on the title page. Evidence unknown to Chambers and Greg, however, indicates that the boys of Blackfriars also performed before the king on 1 January 1607, and this, together with similarities in paper stock and metal type between A Trick to Catch a New One and The Revenger's Tragedy, first published in 1607, suggest that both plays were in production in Eld's workshop at the same time, in late 1607 and early 1608, shortly after their entry into the Stationer's Register. A second quarto, printed by Eld for the stationer Thomas Langle, was published in 1616.

The play is generally believed to have been written and first performed between 1604 and 1606. If, as the second title page indicates, it was first performed by the Children of Paul's, then it must have preceded the dissolution of that company, which seems to have occurred around the middle of 1606. Attempts to date it more precisely on the basis of internal evidence have been inconclusive.

Nearly two decades after the publication of A Trick to Catch the Old One, Philip Massinger drew on it as one of the sources for his own play, A New Way to Pay Old Debts, first performed in 1626 and published in 1633. In spite of the great popularity of Massinger's play, it did not totally eclipse Middleton's, which was produced at least once more by Sir William Davenant at the theatre at Lincoln's Inn Fields sometime between 1661 and 1665. After that it seems not to have been performed again until its first modern revival at the Mermaid Theatre in 1952.

== Summary ==
The play's protagonist, Theodorus Witgood, has mortgaged his estates to his uncle Pecunius Lucre, a covetous London merchant. Witgood is in love with Joyce, the niece of another London merchant, Walkadine Hoard. Lucre and Hoard are rivals; Hoard resents Lucre because Lucre has shown himself to be an even more ruthless swindler than Hoard is himself. Witgood persuades a former mistress to masquerade as a rich country widow and his new fiancée. Lucre, delighted at the prospect of a rich match for his nephew, provides him with £50 and a vague promise to make Witgood his heir. Similarly and for the same reason, Witgood's creditors stop dunning him and offer him more credit. Conversely, rival suitors for the "rich widow" arise, including Walkadine Hoard.

Witgood advises his past mistress to accept Hoard's proposal and so fix herself for life. She allows herself to be spirited away by Hoard, with Lucre in hot pursuit. The "widow" agrees with Lucre to resist Hoard if Lucre restores Witgood's estates, and Lucre reluctantly agrees. But Witgood's creditors, angry over his apparent loss of a rich match, have him arrested; Witgood, however, claiming a pre-contract with the "widow", cons Hoard into paying his debts. Witgood marries Joyce in secret; at the banquet celebrating Hoard's marriage, it is revealed that Hoard's new rich wife is Witgood's poor ex-mistress. But the courtesan kneels to her new husband and promises to be a good wife, and Witgood joins her in repentance and rejection of his former sensual and spendthrift ways.

== Characters ==
- Theodorus Wit-Good, a gentleman in debt
- Jane (Courtesan), Witgood's mistress
- Host, friend to Witgood
- Witgood's Three Creditors
- Pecunius Lucre, Witgood's uncle, a usurer
- Ginnee, Lucre's wife
- Sam Freedome, son of Lucre's wife and suitor to Joyce
- First and Second Gentlemen, friends to Lucre
- George, Lucre's servant
- Walkadine Hoard, usurer and rival to Lucre
- Joyce, Niece to Walkadine and Onesiphorus Hoard
- Moneylove, suitor to Joyce
- Onesiphorus Hoard, brother to Walkadine Hoard
- Limber, friend to Onesiphorus Hoard
- Kix, friend to Onesiphorus Hoard
- Servant to Walkadine Hoard
- Arthur, another servant to Walkadine Hoard
- Lady Foxestone, friend to Walkadine Hoard
- Sir Tristram Lamprey, a gentleman
- Spitchcock, a gentleman
- Henry Dampit, a lawyer and usurer
- Audry, Dampit's landlady's servant
- Gulfe, a usurer and acquaintance of Dampit
- Sir Lancelot, acquaintance of Dampit
- Drawer, Vintner, Boy, Scrivener, Sergeants, Tailor, Barber, Perfumer, Falconer, Huntsman

Mentioned characters:

- Dick, worker at the inn
- William, bartender at the inn
- Florence, woman at the inn
- Master Muligrubs's sister, a newly widowed woman mentioned by the third creditor
- Mistress Proserpine, Dampit's landlady and Audry's employer
- Anthony Medler, fictitious deceased husband of Jane

== Synopsis ==
=== Act I ===
Scene 1: A town in Leicester, probably on a street

Theodorus Witgood, a ruined gentleman, enters and tells how, after foolishly wasting away all his money on brothels and drunkenness in the city, he has lost all of his lands to his uncle, Pecunius Lucre a usurer. According to Witgood, Lucre's motto is: "He that doth his youth expose / To brothel, drink and danger /Let him that is nearest kin / Cheat before a stranger." Witgood says that he must now find some way to make a living for himself, and hints that he may not be averse to activities "out of the compass of the law" (i.e., illegal). Witgood's Courtesan (kept lady) enters. Witgood scolds her for being the cause of his ruin. The Courtesan replies that the 'jewel' she gave him—her virginity—was worth much more than all the lands he has lost. Witgood lays out a plan to get his lands back from his uncle. The plan involves going to London (where his uncle is now located), and passing the Courtesan off as a wealthy widow whom Witgood intends to marry. The Courtesan agrees to the plan.

As Witgood and the Courtesan exit, Onesiphorus Hoard (a usurer) enters with his friends, Limber and Kix. Onesiphorus says that his brother (Walkadine Hoard) and Witgood's uncle (Lucre) have been mortal enemies for several years. He tells how Walkadine Hoard was recently on the verge of cheating a young heir out of his property, but, at the last minute before the deal was closed—and after a lot of bargaining on Walkadine Hoard's part—Lucre slipped in and cheated the heir himself. Onesiphorus also says that Walkadine Hoard's niece, Joyce might marry Sam Freedom (Lucre's wife's son from another marriage), however, the match has not yet been confirmed. Joyce has two suitors: Sam, a rich idiot, and Moneylove, an impoverished scholar. Onesiphorus says that Joyce is currently in London with Walkadine, where she is learning how to become a gentlewoman so that she can catch a wealthy husband.

Scene 2: Another street in Leicestershire

Witgood tells his friend Host (an innkeeper) that he is about to marry a wealthy Widow whom he plans to take to London so that she can be introduced to his uncle (the 'Widow is actually Witgood's Courtesan). He asks the Host to pose as the 'Widow's' servingman while they are in London. This favour is necessary, Witgood claims, because when she ran away with him, the 'Widow' abandoned all of her servants; to convince his uncle of her wealth, appearances have to be maintained; she will have to have at least one servingman. The Host agrees to fill the role. (Note that the Host is only partially informed of Witgood's plan: He knows that Witgood intends to trick his uncle, but he does not know that the 'Widow' is, in fact, Witgood's Courtesan.)

Scene 3: A street in London

Walkadine Hoard (Onesiphorus' brother, hereafter referred to as 'Hoard') and Lucre (Witgood's uncle), the two old rivals, meet and exchange insults. Hoard is angry at Lucre for intercepting his 'deal' with the young heir he meant to cheat (see 1.1). He vows revenge.

The rivals exit, leaving Sam Freedom (Lucre's wife's son from another marriage; the 'rich idiot' who is suitor to Joyce, Hoard's niece) and Moneylove (Joyce's other suitor; the 'poor scholar') alone on-stage. Sam tells Moneylove that he plans to challenge him to a duel in a month's time. Moneylove readily agrees to the duel, strikes Sam and exits.

Scene 4: A street in London

Witgood and the Host arrive in London. The Host assures Witgood that the 'Widow' has been provided with good lodgings. Dampit and Gulf (two usurers) enter. Witgood tells the Host that Dampit is "the most notorious usurering, blasphemous, atheistical, brothel-vomiting rascal that we have in these latter times." He also says that, although Dampit dresses like a beggar, he is, in fact, very rich—he earned all his money with the devil's help, by cheating and trampling the law. Dampit greets Witgood and rhapsodises about his rise to wealth, repeatedly referring himself as "a great trampler of time": "Thus was poor Harry Dampit made rich by others' laziness, who, though they would not follow their own suits, I made 'em follow me with their purses." Witgood says he is pleased to make Dampit and Gulf's acquaintance once again.

=== Act II ===
Scene 1: A room in Lucre's home in London

Posing as a 'servingman', the Host calls on Lucre and reveals the wealthy 'Widow's' plans to marry Witgood—pretending that he is unaware that Lucre is Witgood's uncle. Hoping that he might be able to profit from a union between his nephew and a wealthy Widow, Lucre tells the 'servingman' Witgood is a "gentleman of the inestimable quality". The 'servingman' asks if Lucre knows anything about Witgood's financial status—because the 'Widow' may not marry him if he is not as wealthy as he has led her to believe. Lucre assures that Witgood's finances are sound. The 'servingman' says that he has heard a rumour that Witgood had mortgaged all his property to an uncle in London. Lucre reveals that he is Witgood's uncle, and assures the 'servingman' that the rumours are false. Feigning reluctance, the 'servingman' tells Lucre where Witgood and the 'Widow' are lodging and exits. Lucre instructs his servant to call on Witgood at his lodging and tell him that his uncle wishes to see him immediately. Witgood enters soon thereafter.

Lucre scolds Witgood for not telling him about his engagement. Witgood apologises and says that he wanted to maintain a low profile because he was worried that his London creditors might catch up with him. Lucre persuades Witgood to send for the 'Widow'. He also lends him fifty pounds for the wedding. Mistress Lucre (Lucre's wife) enters with Sam (her son from another marriage). They greet Witgood warmly. The 'Widow' (Witgood's Courtesan) enters. Lucre gives her a welcoming kiss. Sam tries to give her a welcoming kiss too, but is rejected (and thus offended).

Lucre tells the 'Widow' that he plans to leave everything he owns to Witgood; he instructs Witgood to "show the Widow around the house" (i.e., take her upstairs and have sex with her). Witgood and the Courtesan exit. Lucre tells Sam that he should follow Witgood's example and find himself a wealthy widow instead of wasting time on Joyce. He exits. Feeling that her son has been slighted, Mistress Lucre lays a plan to foil Witgood's engagement. She tells Sam to forget Joyce and gives him a gold chain and a diamond to present to the 'Widow', hoping that he might be able to steal her away from Witgood.

Scene 2: A street in London

Moneylove tells Hoard that he has decided to give up courting Joyce (Hoard's niece). He also says he has heard a rumour that a rich Widow has come to town. He asks Hoard to visit her on his behalf and recommend him to her. He feels that his chances of marrying her are good because her only suitor is the profligate rascal, Witgood, nephew of Hoard's greatest enemy. Realizing his chance to get his revenge on his Lucre, Hoard agrees to visit the Widow on Moneylove's behalf soon. As soon as Moneylove exits, Hoard calls him a fool and makes plans to discredit Witgood and marry the Widow himself, thus increasing his estate and crossing his enemy in a single stroke.

Word of Witgood and the 'Widow' has apparently spread quite quickly: three of Witgood's creditors enter, on their way to Witgood's lodgings. Hoard decides to follow them.

=== Act III ===
Scene 1: The common room in Witgood's inn

Witgood's creditors confront Witgood to collect on their debts. Witgood tells them to be patient—as soon as he manages to marry the 'Widow', they will all be paid. He even convinces them to lend him further funds to help his courtship along. They agree to supply him with whatever he needs and exit. The Courtesan enters and tells Witgood that she has received gifts from several suitors, including Hoard, who has promised to prove that Witgood is a riotous, ruined scoundrel. Witgood encourages her to play her hand for all it is worth. He says that he would be genuinely pleased to see her snag a profitable marriage to Hoard. He exits.

Hoard enters with his friends, Lamprey and Spitchcock, and the Host (who is posing as the 'Widow's' servingman). After being introduced by Hoard as gentlemen of reputation, Lamprey and Spitchcock tell the 'Widow' that Witgood is a riotous, ruined scoundrel. 'Shocked' the 'Widow' renounces Witgood on the spot and plans to part with him. Hoard suggests that the 'Widow' should marry him instead. She tells him that she doesn't have any money or property at all. Assuming that she is only testing him, Hoard says that he has more than enough money of his own—he only wants to marry her for love. The 'Widow' agrees to the marriage—but how will she rid herself of Witgood and his uncle, whom she is scheduled to dine with at a tavern that evening? Hoard says that he will meet the 'Widow' at the tavern, whisk her away under Witgood's nose, and take her to Coal Harbor that night to marry her. (Coal Harbor was a disreputable area near London Bridge where a wedding could be performed quickly, without fuss). The 'Widow' agrees to the plan.

Hoard, Lamprey and Spitchcock exit. Witgood enters, laughing because he has overheard Hoard's plan. The Courtesan ('Widow') exits. Lucre pops in on Witgood to ask how things with the 'Widow' are progressing. Witgood says that things are going well, but he is worried because the 'Widow' has so many suitors. Lucre tells Witgood not to worry—he intends to do everything in his power to impress the 'Widow' (and thus secure her promise to marry Witgood) that night at dinner.

Scene 2: A room in Hoard's house

Hoard tells his niece, Joyce that he will find a good husband for her soon. After he exits, Joyce notes that it is unlikely that he will match her with the man she truly wants to marry the most: his enemy's nephew, Witgood. Lucre's servant, George, brings Joyce a private letter and exits. Joyce reads the letter, which is from Witgood, who pledges love to her and urges her to disbelieve any rumours she may hear about him. Joyce says she will trust Witgood.

Scene 3: The common room of a tavern

Hoard thanks Spitchcock and Lamprey for helping him court the 'Widow'. Spitchcock and Lamprey bicker over which one of them helped more. They enter a room at the tavern. The Courtesan enters the tavern with Witgood and the Host. Witgood exits to inspect the kitchen. The Courtesan sends the Host back to her lodging to fetch a ring, which she says she forgot. As soon as she is alone, she instructs the tavern boy to inform Hoard of her arrival. Hoard enters with Lamprey and Spitchcock. They take the 'Widow' away to get married.

Witgood enters. He asks the owner of the tavern to take special care with the dinner—he is dining with his uncle and prospective bride and wishes to make a favourable impression. The tavern boy tells Witgood that the 'Widow' is gone, carried off by Hoard & co. Witgood feigns surprise. The Host re-enters, saying that he could not find the ring. Witgood tells him that the 'Widow' has been stolen. Lucre enters with his two friends, Limber and Kix. Witgood tells him that his mortal enemy, Hoard, has stolen the 'Widow'. Lucre is infuriated. They all rush off to Coal Harbor without delay.

Scene 4: A room in Dampit's house

Dampit is drunk at his home. His landlady's servant, Audrey begs him to go to bed. He heaps abuse on her and refuses to retire until she brings him a glass of beer.

=== Act IV ===
Scene 1: The common room of the tavern at Coal Harbor

Hoard and the Courtesan ('Widow') are now married. They enter the tavern to celebrate, accompanied by Lamprey and Spitchcock. Lucre bangs on the door and demands to be let inside. Hoard wants to ignore him, but the 'Widow' begs them to admit him so she can play a trick on him to disgrace him further. Hoard agrees to grant her request.

Lucre enters, accompanied by Limber, Kix and the 'servingman' (Host). He takes the 'Widow' aside to speak with her in private. Unaware that she has already married Hoard, Lucre begs the 'Widow' to return to Witgood. The 'Widow' replies that, although she loved him, she broke with Witgood because she discovered that he is a ruined rascal who mortgaged all of his lands to his uncle—not the wealthy gentleman he pretended to be at all. Willing to do anything to upstage his enemy, Lucre promises to restore all of Witgood's lands and make him his heir if the 'Widow' will reconsider. The 'Widow' agrees to the deal.

Scene 2: A room in Lucre's house

Vowing to do anything to see Hoard humiliated, Lucre gives Witgood all of his lands back. Witgood vows that he will never be foolish enough to let his property slip out of his hands again.

Scene 4: A room in Hoard's house

Gloating over his good luck, Hoard anticipates the pleasure of rubbing his enemy's nose in his new fortune. A tailor, a barber, a perfumer, a huntsman and a falconer enter. Hoard has all hired them to serve him, believing that he will soon be rich enough to live in the manner of a wealthy gentleman. He assigns each of them a task to perform. They exit. The Courtesan ('Widow'), who is now Mistress Jane Hoard, enters. Hoard asks her if she would rather have the wedding dinner in the country or the city. She says she prefers the city.

The Host ('servingman') enters with a private letter from Witgood for the 'Widow'. He tells Hoard that the letter is bad news. The 'bad news' is a little bit complicated; it consists of two related revelations: A) Witgood had a 'precontract' with the 'Widow' (a precontract is a legally binding betrothal that would nullify Hoard's marriage); B) Witgood has been arrested by his creditors, and blames Hoard for his failure to pay up because Hoard has detained the 'precontracted' marriage that would enable him to pay his debts.

Realizing that Witgood is in serious trouble, and realising that she has no choice but to help him out, the 'Widow' tells Hoard that she did, indeed, make a precontract with Witgood, and faults herself for her foolishness. She urges Hoard to pay off Witgood's 'paltry' debts immediately so they can be rid of the rascal forever. Hoard orders the 'servingman' to summon Witgood and his creditors immediately.

Witgood and his creditors enter. Hoard offer to settle all Witgood's debts if Witgood will agree to release the 'Widow' from the precontract. Witgood agrees to the deal. With his debts thus absolved and his property reclaimed, Witgood makes plans to marry Joyce immediately.

Scene 5: Dampit's bedroom

Dampit is in his bed, sick from too much drinking (but continuing to drink). Lamprey and Spitchcock enter and ask to borrow some money, Dampit denies them. Lancelot (another gentleman) enters. Dampit greets him warmly. Lancelot marvels at Dampit's advanced decrepitude. As a jest, Lancelot pretends to leave the bedroom. Dampit begins to curse him as soon as he is gone. When Lancelot 'returns' to say good-bye one more time, Dampit blesses him and wishes him well. As another jest, Lancelot pretends to be a poor man from the country; he tells Dampit that he has lost all of his land to a usurering villain who has cheated him out of his family home. Dampit advises him avenge himself by setting the house on fire.

Hoard and Gulf enter to visit Dampit. Lancelot tells them that Dampit is almost dead. Gulf says that Dampit's current suffering is the price he must pay for a lifetime of usury and cheating. Dampit calls Gulf a hypocrite and a coward for insulting him when he is in a weakened condition. He challenges him to a fight and showers him with insults. Gulf draws a dagger and prepares to fight; the other men calm him down; they say that the fight is not worth the trouble because Dampit will soon be dead.

=== Act V ===
Scene 1: A room in Lucre's house

Hoard has invited Lucre to his wedding dinner to rub his enemy's nose in his good fortune. Witgood encourages him to attend the dinner and reveals that Hoard has, in fact, married a whore. He also announces that he and Joyce are now man and wife.

Scene 2 The wedding dinner; a room in Hoard's house

Hoard welcomes his guests, who include, among others, Onesiphorus Hoard, his brother from Leicestershire, who is eager to meet his brother's new wife. Onesiphorus recognises the 'Widow' from Leicestershire and regretfully informs Hoard that he has married a whore—Witgood's whore. The Courtesan apologetically confirms Onesiphorus' allegation, but is quick to point out that she told Hoard that she did not have any money when he first proposed. Hoard is infuriated.

Witgood and Lucre enter. Hoard calls them villains and orders them to leave his house. The Courtesan and Witgood both make speeches pledging to renounce their former way of life now that they are married. Hoard ends the play on a note of reconciliation: "So, so, all friends. The wedding dinner cools. Who seem most crafty prove oftentimes most fools."
