= William Percy (writer) =

16th/17th-century English poet and playwright

William Percy (c. 1570/1574–1648), English poet and playwright, was the third son of Henry Percy, 8th Earl of Northumberland (c.1532–1585), and his wife Katharine Neville (1545/6–1596). His elder brother Henry was a significant figure in English cultural and scientific circles in the late 16th - early 17th century.

== Birth and early life ==
Percy's date of birth is a matter of some uncertainty. The year 1574 has accepted by many on the evidence of the entry for Percy’s matriculation at Oxford, which identifies him as being fifteen years old on 13 June 1589. However, Bishop Thomas Percy records that he was born at Beamish on 29 June 1570.

Percy attended Oxford University where he studied logic under the Aristotelian scholar John Case, along with Italian and Latin, although his growing interest was contemporary English literature, including the works of Gabriel Harvey, Sidney and Spenser.

== Writing career ==
At Oxford, Percy belonged to a literary coterie which included Barnabe Barnes, whose Parthenophil and Parthenope (1593) was dedicated "To the right noble and vertuous gentleman, M. William Percy Esquier, his deerest friend." A year later, Percy published his own collection, Sonnets to the Fairest Coelia (1594). In the preface, Percy claimed publication was forced on him because, having lent the manuscripts to a friend, he found they were about to be printed without his consent. He therefore added an epistle in which he urged the reader of the sonnets "to account of them as of toyes," promising that "ere long, I will impart vnto the world another Poeme which shall be both more fruitfull and ponderous." He included a "Madrigal" dedicated to Barnes, referred to by the name "Parthenophil."

Although Percy was not a very talented poet, his circle included better writers such as Charles Fitzgeoffrey who, in his collection of Latin epigrams Affaniae praises Percy's skills. Others in the same group were the Mychelbourne brothers, Edward, Lawrence, and Thomas, all of whom feature in Percy's poems. A later member was Thomas Campion who praises Percy in his Epigrammatum II (1619) for his wit.

Percy also wrote plays, six of which survive in manuscript. The Faery Pastoral, or, Forest of Elves may have been written for the visit of James I to Syon House (London home of Percy's brother the Earl) on 8 June 1603. However, Percy's stage directions indicate that he wrote most of his plays with the intention they should be performed either by one of London's adult companies or by the Children of Paul's. His other extant plays are Chaunge is no Robberye or The Bearing down of the Inne: A Comaedye (1601), Arabia sitiens, or, A Dreame of a Drye Yeare: a Tragaecomodye (1601), A Country Tragaedye in Vacunium (1602), The Aphrodysial, or, Sea Feast: a Marinall (1602); his last play, Necromantes, or, The Two Supposed Heds: a Comicall Invention (1632) is designated "For Actors only." Although none of his plays have attracted praise for literary merit, Arabia sitiens, more recently known by the alternate title Mahomet and His Heaven, is of interest because it gives some insight into contemporary English attitudes to Islam.

== Writings ==
- William Percy's Mahomet and his heaven : a critical edition, ed. by Matthew Dimmock; Aldershot [u.a.] : Ashgate, c 2006, ISBN 978-0-7546-5406-3
- The aphrodysial or sea-feast, edited by Maria Shmygol, Manchester : Manchester University Press, 2022, ISBN 978-1-5261-6951-8

== Death ==
Like his elder brother Henry, William Percy seems to have been imprisoned at points in his life; but in his case mostly for debt. He finally settled in Oxford where, according to Anthony Wood, he died in reduced circumstances: "an aged Bachelour in Pennyfarthingstreet, after he had lived a melancholy & retired life many yeares" and was "buried in the Cathedrall of Ch[rist] Church neare to the grave of Sir Hen. Gage, 28 of May 1648"
