= Ignoramus (play) =

1615 play by George Ruggle

Ignoramus is a college farce, a 1615 academic play by George Ruggle. Written in Latin (with passages in English and French), it was arguably the most famous and influential academic play of English Renaissance drama. Ruggle based his play on La Trappolaria (1596), an Italian comedy by Giambattista della Porta (which in turn borrows from the Pseudolus of Plautus).

In Latin, ignoramus, the first-person plural present active indicative of īgnōrō (“I do not know”, “I am unacquainted with”, “I am ignorant of”), literally means “we are ignorant of” or “we do not know”. The term acquired its English meaning of an ignorant person or dunce as a consequence of Ruggle's play.

== Performance ==
The play was first produced in Clare College, Cambridge, on Wednesday, March 8, 1615, as part of the program of entertainments for a visit by King James I. He reportedly enjoyed the play so much that he returned to Cambridge to see it again on Saturday, May 13 of that year. Contemporary John Chamberlain reported that "the play was full of mirth and variety with many excellent actors, but more than half spoiled by its extreme length of six hours."

== Texts ==
Ignoramus was entered into the Stationers' Register on April 18, 1615, and was published later that year by the bookseller Walter Burre. Two subsequent editions were issued in 1630, and other editions followed in 1658, 1659, 1668, 1707, 1731, 1736, 1737, and after. John Sidney Hawkins issued an elaborately edited text in 1787.

Several manuscripts of the play also exist. The manuscript in the collection of the Bodleian Library, Tanner MS. 306, features a cast list of the amateur actors in the original production.

Fernando Parkhurst translated the original into English in 1660, as Ignoramus, or the Academical Lawyer; Robert Codrington's translation followed in 1662. The English-language versions were presented onstage during the Restoration.

== Satire ==
The play satirizes the college recorder, Francis Brackyn (also spelt Brackin), a "constant adversary of the university" who is represented as the Ignoramus of the title. Brackyn was unpopular among the academics of the town as a "common lawyer" (they used a crude "law Latin" that the academics deplored); he had previously been ridiculed in the third of the Parnassus plays. In Ignoramus, Brackyn is given a romance of false loves; he is enamored of Rosabella and pays 600 gold pieces for her hand in marriage, but is tricked into being with the mannish Polla. Like Malvolio, who is supposed to be mad, he is suspected of being possessed and put through an exorcism before being carried off to a monastery to recuperate (and to stay away from the loves of the more worthy wits).

The lawyers who were the subject of the play's satire did not enjoy the work; Sir Edward Coke, the Lord Chief Justice, believed that he was a target of some of the barbs. The play provoked a quarrel between academics and lawyers. The lawyers responded with satirical poems and ballads, which inspired responses by the academics to create a passionate controversy. Ruggle's play even had an influence on the reform of legal language in England.

== Author ==
George Ruggle (1575–1622) graduated from Lavenham Grammar School and matriculated at St. John's, Cambridge in 1589. He transferred to Trinity College, where he received his Bachelor of Arts in 1593 and his Master of Arts in 1597. He became a fellow of Clare Hall the following year and remained in Cambridge until 1620.

Upon Ruggle's death, Nicholas Ferrar read a eulogy for the academic at a meeting of the Virginia Company; he referred to Ruggle as a "Brother of the Company" and revealed that Ruggle had worked for the company for the last three years of his life. In his will, Ruggle left £100 for the Christian education of American Indian children in Virginia.

Ruggle is reported to have written other plays, but none are extant.
