= Barnabe Barnes =

16th/17th-century English poet and playwright

- Born: c. 1571
- Died: 1609 (aged c. 38)
- Occupation: poet

Barnabe Barnes (c. 1571 – 1609) was an English poet. He is known for his Petrarchan love sonnets and for his combative personality, involving feuds with other writers and culminating in an alleged attempted murder.

== Early life ==
The third son of Dr Richard Barnes, bishop of Durham, he was baptised in York at the church of St Michael le Belfry on 6 March 1571. In 1586 he was entered at Brasenose College, Oxford, but did not take his degree. His father died in 1587 leaving two-thirds of his estate to be divided among his six children, and Barnes appears to have been able to live on income from this bequest. In 1591 he went to France with the earl of Essex, who was then serving against the prince of Parma. On his return he published Parthenophil and Parthenophe, Sonnettes, Madrigals, Elegies and Odes (entered on to the Stationers' Register in 1593), dedicated to his "dearest friend," the poet and nobleman William Percy, who contributed a sonnet to the eulogies prefixed to a later work, Offices. Parthenophil was possibly printed for private circulation, and the copy in the duke of Devonshire's library is believed to be unique.

== Sonnets ==
Barnabe Barnes was well acquainted with the work of contemporary French sonneteers, to whom he is largely indebted, and he borrows his title, apparently, from a Neapolitan writer of Latin verse, Hieronymus Angerianus. "Parthenophil and Parthenophe" are the names given to the two protagonists in the sonnets, the first name meaning "virgin-lover" and the second "virgin". It is possible to outline a story from this series of love lyrics, but the incidents are slight, and in this case, as in other Elizabethan sonnet-cycles, it is difficult to dogmatise as to what is the expression of a real personal experience, and what is intellectual exercise in imitation of Petrarch. Parthenophil abounds in passages of great freshness and beauty, although its elaborate conceits are sometimes over-ingenious and strained. For example, the passage in which Parthenophil wishes to be transformed into the wine his mistress drinks, so that he might pass through her, excited the derision of at least one hostile contemporary critic, Thomas Nashe.

The sequence also has a highly unusual ending: the lover Parthenophil dreams that he uses black magic to compel his unattainable mistress to appear to him naked, whereupon he rapes her. This is such a reversal of Petrarchan convention that it has been interpreted as possibly reflecting contemporary political tensions. John Cox suggests that it is linked to the unfolding conflict between the Earl of Essex and Queen Elizabeth, in which Parthenophe stands for Elizabeth: "Since Parthenophe means virgin Barnes's dream seems unavoidably political, and the stance of frustrated expectation, occasioned by an unyielding and unapproachable female, seems appropriate to one of Essex's party in the early 1590s."

== Feuds and attempted murder ==
Barnes became involved in the pamphlet feud between Gabriel Harvey and Thomas Nashe. Barnes took the part of Harvey, who wanted to impose the Latin rules of quantity on English verse: Barnes even experimented in classical metres himself. This partisanship is sufficient to account for the abuse of Nashe, who accused him, apparently on no proof at all, of stealing a nobleman's chain at Windsor, and of other things. Prior to this literary assault Barnes had written a sonnet for Harvey's anti-Nashe pamphlet Pierces Supererogation (1593), in which he labelled Nashe a confidence trickster, a liar, a viper, a laughing stock and mere "worthless matter" who should be flattered that Harvey even deigned to insult him. Nashe, never slow to pick a fight, took due note: "But my young master Barnaby the Bright, and his kindness (before any desert at all of mine towards him might pluck him on or provoke it), I neither have nor will be unmindful of." He therefore responded in kind in Have with You to Saffron-Walden (1596) with various observations on Barnes: he was a bad poet, he had dreadful dress sense ("getting him a strange pair of Babylonian britches, with a codpiece as big as a Bolognian sausage") and had been a coward on the field of battle during the wars in France. Nashe claimed, not entirely seriously, that Barnes had gone to the general to complain war was dangerous, highly illegal and he wanted to go home at once, and despite six burly captains offering to be his personal bodyguard "home he would, nothing would stay him, to finish Parthenophil and Parthenope and write in praise of Gabriel Harvey."

These charges may well be comic fabrications. It is however on record that Barnes was prosecuted in Star Chamber in 1598 for attempting to murder one John Browne, first by offering him a poisoned lemon and then by sweetening his wine with sugar laced with mercury sublimate. Browne fortunately survived the attack and Barnes fled prison before the case concluded. He was not pursued. It seems likely he attempted Browne's assassination at the behest of Lord Eure, warden of the Middle March and of Berwick upon Tweed, and political stringpulling protected him.

== Later works ==
Barnes's second work, A Divine Centurie of Spirituall Sonnetts, appeared in 1595. He also wrote two plays: The Devil's Charter (1607), a tragedy dealing with the life of Pope Alexander VI, which was played before the king; and The Battle of Evesham (or Hexham), of which the manuscript, traced to the beginning of the 18th century, is lost. In 1606 he dedicated to King James Offices enabling privat Persons for the special service of all good Princes and Policies, a prose treatise containing, among other things, descriptions of Queen Elizabeth and of the earl of Essex. Barnabe Barnes was buried at Durham in December 1609.
