= Gabriel Lobo Lasso de la Vega =

Castilian poet, playwright, and historian

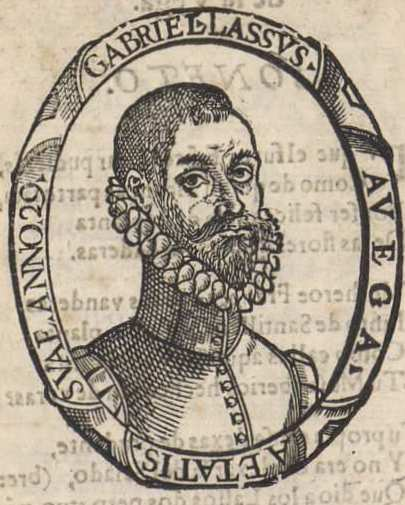
Portrait of Gabriel Lobo Lasso de la Vega

Gabriel Lobo Lasso de la Vega (1555–1615) was a Castilian poet, playwright, and historian of the Spanish Golden Age.

De la Vega came from a minor noble family, the Counts of Puertollano, and was born and died in Madrid. He studied under the epic poet Alonso de Ercilla from 1571 to 1572. He was a king's guardsman under Philip II and Philip III. This gave him plenty of time to pursue literature.
