= William Stansby =

British publisher

William Stansby (1572–1638) was a London printer and publisher of the Jacobean and Caroline eras, working under his own name from 1610. One of the most prolific printers of his time, Stansby is best remembered for publishing the landmark first folio collection of the works of Ben Jonson in 1616.

== Life ==
As for many individuals of his time, Stansby's date of birth is unrecorded – though the event likely occurred shortly before his baptism on 8 July 1572. He was one of fourteen children of Richard Stansby, a cutler from Exeter. At Christmas 1589/90 William Stansby was apprenticed to the London stationer John Windet; Stansby completed his apprenticeship and became a freeman of the Stationers Company, the guild of London printers and booksellers, on 7 January 1597. Stansby remained with Windet, first as a journeyman and then in 1609 as partner in his house at the sign of the Cross Keys, until Windet's death in 1610. Windet left a half-share of his business (well equipped with three printing presses) to Stansby, setting him up as an independent craftsman. (The other half of the business passed to Windet's two daughters, from whom Stansby purchased it.)

At the time, the Stationers Company included booksellers and printers as largely separate classes: publishing was generally done by the booksellers, who hired the printers to produce their books, broadsheets and other printed matter. Some printers did some publishing as a secondary aspect of their primary business. Stansby followed the general pattern: the majority of his books were printed for booksellers to sell in their shops, while the remainder were works that Stansby published independently.

== Printer ==
As a printer Stansby worked for many of the booksellers of his era; he also worked repeatedly for several stationers over the years. For John Smethwick, Stansby printed several editions of the collected Poems of Michael Drayton (1609–30), plus several of the later editions of prose works by Robert Greene, like Menaphon (1616, 1631) and Never Too Late (1621). Stansby printed collections of the sermons of Barten Holyday for Nathaniel Butter. (He also printed Holyday's only play, Technogamia, for John Parker.)

For Edward Blount, Stansby printed an English translation of John Owen's Latin epigrams (1619), and Six Court Comedies (1632), the first collected edition of the plays of John Lyly. And for Blount and William Barret, Stansby printed Thomas Shelton's first English translation of Miguel de Cervantes' 1605 (thus, part 1) novel Don Quixote (2 volumes, 1612).

Musical titles printed by Stansby are listed in an article by Cecil Hill and include The Teares or / LamentacioNs of / a sorrowfvll / Sovle (1614) and MADRIGALES / and / AYRES (1632).

Stansby printed works by Samuel Purchas for Henry Featherstone, and works by Joseph Hall for Featherstone and for Butter. He printed Sir Walter Raleigh's A History of the World (1614) for Walter Burre. And Stansby printed a wide range of works significant in their day but now largely forgotten. Sir Dudley Digges's The Defence of Trade (1615), printed for John Barnes, and William Slater's Palae-Albion (1621), printed for Richard Meighen, are two of many examples.

Also for Meighen, Stansby printed the first edition of John Clavell's A Recantation of an Ill Led Life (1628).

In some cases, printers are identified on title pages only by initials; yet bibliographers can employ title-page colophons and other clues to make identifications. On this basis, Stansby is the "W. S." who printed the second quarto of Shakespeare's Love's Labor's Lost (1631) and the undated fourth quarto of Hamlet (c. 1630), both for Smethwick. In 1617 Stansby printed the tenth edition of Shakespeare's Venus and Adonis for William Barret.

== Publisher ==
As a publisher, Stansby's most significant work was certainly the 1616 Jonson folio, which represented the first instance of a collected edition of the stage plays of a contemporary dramatist. He also published Thomas Coryat's famous travelogue Coryat's Crudities (1611), and Thomas Lodge's translation of the works of Seneca (1614, 1620). George Sandys's translation of the Metamorphoses of Ovid came from Stansby's presses in 1626.

Stansby continued to publish some works and authors originally issued by his master Windet. Perhaps the important example was Richard Hooker's Of the Laws of Ecclesiastical Polity; Windet had published editions in 1597 and 1604, and Stansby continued with editions in 1611, 1617, 1622, and 1631–32.

Like most printers who published, Stansby had to arrange for retail sale of his works. The title page of his 1620 edition of Jonson's Epicene specifies that the work is sold by the bookseller John Browne.

Stansby's editions of two works by John Selden, Titles of Honour (1614, 1631) and Mare Clausum (1635), were notable for being among the earliest English books that printed Arabic and Turkish words. The former book, in both editions, used carved woodblocks for its non-English terms; the latter was the first English book that used movable type to print Arabic.

One of Stansby's later projects was the 1634 edition of Sir Thomas Malory's Le Morte d'Arthur, which would be the last edition of that work prior to the revival of interest in Malory and his book in the nineteenth century. Stansby eventually sold his business to stationer Richard Bishop for £700.

== Sirenaics ==
William Stansby has been associated with the "Sirenaics" or "Sirenaical Gentlemen," (also spelled 'Sireniacal') a mysterious group that drew their name from their meeting place the Mermaid Tavern in Bread Street the first Friday of every month. The group included figures with whom Stansby had known links, like Thomas Coryat, Samuel Purchas, and John Donne, as well as a range of influential figures in politics and law. (Stansby printed Donne's first book, Pseudo-Martyr, for Walter Burre in 1610.)

== Controversy ==
The records of the Stationers Company show that Stansby was repeatedly fined, throughout his career, for small infractions of the guild's rules – for printing copy to which he did not own the rights; for violating rules governing apprentices; even for speaking harsh words to colleagues. This sort of record was not atypical of stationers of the time; printing was a rough-and-tumble trade.

In one instance, Stansby got himself into much more serious trouble. Probably in 1620, Stansby printed a topical pamphlet for Nathaniel Butter: titled A Plain Demonstration of the Unlawful Succession of Ferdinand II, Because of the Incestuous Marriage of His Parents, the work criticized the 1619 accession of the new Holy Roman Emperor. This was one of a series of pamphlets Stansby printed on the controversy that sparked the opening of the Thirty Years' War. The title page of the pamphlet on Ferdinand II bore the false claim that it was printed "at the Hague" – but the Stuart authorities were not fooled; first Butter, and then Stansby, were arrested for violating the regime's strict censorship policy, and Stansby's presses were damaged. Petitions for mercy from both Butter and Stansby survive in the extant records; in his, Stansby places all the blame for the affair on Butter. Both men spent some months in prison over the matter, but were eventually released.

While a prison sentence is a more substantive matter than mere fines for breaking guild rules, Butter and Stansby were far from the only stationers who were incarcerated for their professional activities. Other prominent stationers of the era, like John and Edward Allde, Nicholas Okes, and Thomas Archer, shared similar fates.

== Reputation ==
Despite these legal problems, Stansby earned in his own time, and retains among modern bibliographers, a generally high respect for the quality of his printed texts. He has been characterized as "very reputable," and one of the "busiest and most prestigious printers in London" in his generation. Ben Jonson chose Stansby for the task of printing his 1616 folio precisely for the quality of Stansby's workmanship and his willingness to meet Jonson's standards and demands.
