= Lingua (play) =

Play by Thomas Tomkis

Lingua, or the Combat of the Tongue and the Five Senses for Superiority is an allegorical stage play of the first decade of the 17th century, generally attributed to the academic playwright Thomas Tomkis.

== Publication ==
Lingua was entered into the Stationers' Register on 23 February 1607 (new style), and was published later that year in a quarto printed by George Eld for the bookseller Simon Waterson. The play proved to have unusual long-term popularity for an academic work, and was reprinted in 1610, 1617, 1622, 1632, and 1657. Its use of English rather than the more normal Latin gave Lingua a wider accessibility to a general audience than academic dramas of its era usually had. In 1613, Lingua was translated into a German version titled Speculum Aestheticum, by Johannes Rhenanus; a Dutch translation followed in 1648, by Lambert van den Bosch.

== The allegory ==
As its title and subtitle indicate, the play portrays Lingua, the personification of language, asserting her importance against the traditional personifications of the senses. (Auditus is hearing, Visus is sight; Olfactus, Gustus, and Tactus round out the five.) This allegorical treatment of the five senses reaches far back into the literature and drama of the Middle Ages – though Tomkis departs from the Medieval tradition by depicting the five senses as male rather than female figures. (The change allows Tomkis to cast the play's conflict in an anti-feminist, battle-of-the-sexes context.)

As noted above, the play's plot derives from the story of the Judgement of Paris: like Eris among the Olympian gods, Lingua inspires dissension and competition among the five senses by offering a prize for the worthiest of them. She leaves a golden crown and a royal robe in a grove in "Microcosmus", with this inscription:

He of the five that proves himself the best,
Shall have his temples with this coronet blest.

The five quarrel over who should receive the gifts; they go so far as to prepare for physical combat, though "Communis Sensus", the viceregent of Queen Psyche, forestalls that extremity. Like Paris, he presides over the competition, eventually awarding the crown to Visus and the robe to Tactus; the other three receive consolation prizes of offices under Psyche. Lingua's claim to be the sixth sense is rejected – though with a qualification: it is allowed that woman have six senses, the sixth being "the sense of speaking."

Madame Lingua is not willing to accept this status of being "half a sense." At a celebratory banquet she serves the senses drugged wine, which deranges them; but further disruption is suppressed by the charm of Somnus. Lingua talks in her sleep and confesses her plot; she is imprisoned so that she cannot "wag abroad."

The play features a range of other personifications – Terra, Comedus, Phantastes, Lumen (light), Coelum (the sky), and others – even Tobacco, "the king of Trinidado" who has "conquered all Europe." The classical deities Ceres and Bacchus also appear.

Medieval allegory was a dying form in Tomkis's era, though it still appeared on occasion; Phineas Fletcher's The Purple Island (1633) is one late example. Tomkis's play has been praised for the excellence of its style; "Tomkis proves himself a master of polished and flexible dialogue...The wit is sparkling and unforced", delivered "with scholarly grace." The play's comedy often provides a burlesque of famous plays of its era, mocking the heroic speeches of The Spanish Tragedy and offering apparent Shakespearean allusions.

== Date ==
The date of the play's stage premiere is uncertain. The play's text itself contains a reference to the year 1602: "About the year 1602 many used this skew kind of language" (Act III, scene v). Some scholars have supported this date by noting apparent contemporary references and allusions; the personification of "Queen Psyche" (IV, vii), for example, is the type of compliment to Queen Elizabeth common during her reign, and is logical in play written prior to her 1603 death. Other commentators have demurred, however; apparent allusions to Shakespeare's Macbeth suggest a date closer to the 1607 publication to some critics.

=== Connection to Oliver Cromwell ===
A reference to Lingua from 1663 states that Oliver Cromwell played a part in an early production of the play. If this tradition has any validity, it may involve the entertainment that Cromwell's uncle, Sir Oliver Cromwell, provided for King James I at Hinchingbrooke in late April 1603. If Lingua was staged for the king at that time and place (which is uncertain), the future Protector and regicide at four years old may have filled the role of Small Beer in Act IV, Scene V.

== Authorship ==
The early editions of Lingua were all printed with no attribution of authorship. A manuscript list of books and papers from the hand of Sir John Harington assigns the play to Tomkis; and the play's resemblances with Tomkis's Albumazar have persuaded scholars that Harington's attribution of Lingua to Tomkis is correct.

== Sources ==
Tomkis borrowed and adapted his main plot from the classical myth of the Judgement of Paris; but particular features of his work depend upon more contemporaneous influences, including Spenser's The Faerie Queene, Du Bartas' La Sepmaine, and Sir John Davies's Nosce Teipsum.

== Costumes ==
The 1607 quarto of Lingua is very unusual in that it provides highly detailed and specific descriptions of the costumes worn by the actors:

- Auditus wears "a garland of bays intermingled with red and white roses upon a false hair, a cloth of silver mantle upon a pair of stain bases, wrought sleeves, buskins, gloves, &c."
- Visus, like the other Senses, is also furnished with a garland of bays and red and white roses; he wears "a light coloured taffeta mantle striped with silver, and fringed upon green silk bases, buskins, &c." he also carries a fan of peacock feathers. His companion Colour is "clad in changeable silk, with a rainbow out of a cloud on her head...."

The rest of the play's figures are similarly, gaudily accoutered.

Such detailed descriptions are often found in the published texts of masques from the Stuart era, but not in play texts. The costumes of Lingua may give a rare indication of the range of costumes used in the plays of the era (though generalizing from one academic play to the popular drama of the London theatres requires caution).
