= Stichus =

Comedy by Plautus

- Written by: Plautus
- Based on: Adelphoe by Menander
- Original language: Latin
- Genre: Roman comedy
- Setting: Athens

Premiere
- Date premiered: 200 BC
- Place premiered: Rome?

Stichus is a comedic Latin play by the early Roman playwright Titus Maccius Plautus. According to a notice transmitted with the play, Stichus was first performed in 200 BC, and was adapted from the play Adelphoe by Menander.

== Plot ==
In Athens, the two daughters of wealthy Antipho, Panegyris and Pamphila, are married to the brothers Epignomus and Pamphilippus. Due to mismanagement of their property, the two husbands became merchants to make money, and by the start of the play they have been away for more than two years. As no news has been received about their husbands' whereabouts, the women are urged by their father to remarry, but they refuse.

The slave boy Pinacium brings news to Panegyris that her husband Epignomus has returned. When Epignomus enters, his slave Stichus requests some time off for a home-coming party, which is granted. A short time later Pamphilippus enters, and Antipho requests him to give him a female slave, after which they become reconciled.

Part of the amusement of the comedy is in the attempts of the ever-hungry parasite Gelasimus to get an invitation to dinner; but he is continually rebuffed, first by the slaves Crocotium and Pinacium, then by Panegyris, and finally by both husbands.

The final scene is the celebration of Epignomus's slave Stichus to celebrate the homecoming. He and his friend Sagarinus/Sangarinus celebrate with their shared mistress, Stephanium. The play ends with a dance.

The stage set shows three houses, those of Antipho, Panegyris/Epignomus, and Pamphila/Pamphilippus. The action takes place in the street in front of the houses.

== Metrical and dramatic structure ==
The metrical scheme of the play is relatively simple. If A = iambic senarii, B = other metres, and C = trochaic septenarii, the scheme is as follows:

BC, ABC, AC, ABC, AB

Unusually, the play starts with a polymetric song rather than the usual iambic senarii, and similarly ends with a polymetric song, instead of the expected trochaic septenarii.

Overall, the plot is symmetrical and can be represented as follows:

Act 1: Antipho talks with his two daughters (BC)

Act 2: Gelasimus and Crocotium (A) Pinacium's song (B), Gelasimus is rebuffed (C)

Act 3(i): Stichus requests Epignomus for time off (A)

Act 3(ii): Gelasimus is rebuffed (A)

Act 4(i): Antipho requests Pamphilippus for a dancing girl (C)

Act 4(ii): Gelasimus is rebuffed (C)

Act 5: Stichus celebrates with his two companions (ABC, AB)

The plot is managed in such a way that there are never more than three speaking characters on stage at the same time.

== The plot in detail ==
=== The sisters' dilemma ===
- Act 1.1 (1–47): polymetric song (47 lines)

Panegyris and her younger sister Pamphila are complaining that their husbands have been away for more than two years, and their father is pressing them to remarry.

- Act 1.2 (58–66): trochaic septenarii (9 lines)

Their father Antipho comes from his house, scolding his slaves for laziness.

- Act 1.2 (67): iambic octonarius (1 line)

Antipho tells the slaves to call him from next door if he is needed.

- Act 1.2 (68–154): trochaic septenarii (87 lines)

Pamphila advises her sister that they should beg their father to allow them to wait for their absent husbands, but if he insists on their remarrying, they have to obey. Meanwhile Antipho debates with himself the best way of persuading his stubborn daughters. The sisters try to greet their father with a kiss, but he rejects their kiss. First he tests them by asking what sort of woman is best for him to marry, now that he is a widower. Then he tells them that his friends are advising him that he should make them both marry again. The sisters tell him, however, they would prefer to wait for their husbands to return.

When Antipho has gone, Panegyris calls through the door for her maid Crocotium: she wants to send her to fetch the parasite Gelasimus, so that Gelasimus can go to the harbour to see if there is any news.

=== Pinacium brings good news ===
- Act 1.3 (155–273): iambic senarii (114 lines)

Gelasimus arrives before being called; he complains how he is constantly hungry, and tells the audience that he is willing to pay for his meals with amusing conversation. Crocotium greets him and tells him that her mistress wishes to see him; but the mistress has no meal to offer him; on the contrary Crocotium thinks the mistress perhaps intends to borrow some corn from him. Crocotium goes inside while Gelasimus says he will come shortly.

- Act 2.1 (274–308): iambo-trochaic polymetric song (mostly ia8) (35 lines)

While Gelasimus watches, a young slave boy Pinacium arrives running, carrying a fishing basket. Pinacium is singing joyfully that he has good news for his mistress. He wonders whether he should wait for her to come out to honour him; but eventually he goes up to the door and knocks.

- Act 2.1–2.2 (309–330): anapaestic song (22 lines)

Pinacium knocks loudly on the door, but is frustrated when no one answers. Gelasimus asks him what he has in the basket, but Pinacium replies to him cheekily. At last Panegyris comes to the door and asks Gelasimus why he is knocking so loudly. She hears Pinacium's voice but can't see him at first.

- Act 2.2 (331–401): trochaic septenarii (71 lines)

Pinacium tells her he is quite exhausted with running. But instead of immediately telling her the good news he calls for the other slaves to sweep the house and bring a bucket and water and prepare a feast. At last he informs Panegyris that her husband Epignomus and his servant Stichus have arrived at the harbour with a big boat full of expensive things. When she asks about Pamphila's husband Pamphilippus, Pinacium says he didn't see him, but heard he had arrived too. Gelasimus offers to help with the preparations, but Panegyris tells him she has enough servants in the house and sends him away.

=== The husbands arrive ===
- Act 3.1–3.2 (402–504): iambic senarii (102 lines)

Epignomus arrives with his slave Stichus and some female attendants. He gives a prayer of thanks to Neptune (the god of the sea) and Mercury (the god of traders). He says that he has met Antipho and is once again in favour with him. Stichus meanwhile asks if he may have a day off. Epignomus grants him one, and some wine to celebrate. Stichus tells him he intends to have dinner next door with Pamphilippus's slave Sangarinus and their joint girlfriend Stephanium. In an aside Stichus tells the audience that such things are allowed for slaves in Athens; and that he will use the back door of the house to avoid attracting attention. Stichus goes inside.

The parasite Gelasimus turns up. He has consulted a book of witticisms which he intends to use at dinner. He sees Epignomus and greets him, then invites him to dinner. When Epignomus refuses, Gelasimus wonders if perhaps he might be a guest at Epignomus's dinner, but Epignomus says he already has a full dinner-table of high-ranking ambassadors from Ambracia, so he can't invite him. Gelasimus starts to say something about the leftovers but before he can finish Epignomus wishes him good-day and goes inside. Gelasimus goes off dejected.

- Act 4.1–4.2 (505–640): trochaic septenarii (133 lines)

Antipho and Pamphilippus enter. Pamphilippus wishes to be reassured that he and Antipho are now friends. Antipho says that they are indeed, at any rate now that Pamphilippus has become wealthy. He invites the two brothers to dinner the following day. Now Epignomus comes out of his house, satisfied that his wife has looked after his affairs well. He greets Pamphilippus, whose boat arrived shortly after Epignomus's. Antipho asks them to listen to a story, and describes a certain father-in-law who was given a music-girl by his son-in-law as a present, perhaps even two, and some food to feed them with. Pamphilippus declines to take the hint, but after Antipho has gone he tells his brother that he might as will give him one.
Pamphilippus now asks about the parasite Gelasimus. At that moment Gelasimus arrives. He greets Pamphilippus, and drops heavy hints that he would like to be invited to dinner. But Pamphilippus tells him he is eating out at his brother's. As for Epignomus, he reminds Gelasimus that it was because of Gelasimus's extravagant eating and drinking that they had lost all their wealth before. The brothers depart to their houses leaving Gelasimus declaring that he will kill himself.

=== Stichus's homecoming feast ===
- Act 5.1–5.2 (641–672): iambic senarii (31 lines)

Stichus comes out onto the street. He says he is waiting for Sangarinus, who hasn't come yet. He goes in to fetch the wine. Sangarinus arrives from the harbour, saying he is looking forward to seeing Stephanium. Stichus comes out with the wine and Sangarinus greets him. Stichus tells him about the dinner he has prepared. They go into Pamphilippus's house.

- Act 5.3 (673–682): iambic septenarii (9 lines)

Stephanium comes out from Epignomus's house, telling the audience that she was attending her mistress at the party there. She goes into Pamphilippus's house to prepare herself.

- Act 5.4 (683–761): trochaic septenarii (79 lines)

Sangarinus and Stichus come out bringing wine and some simple food. They start the banquet by drinking, making jokes about how much they have drunk. They offer a cup to the pipe-player to encourage him to blow more strongly. He seems reluctant but drinks a little. While he drinks, Stichus protests that Sangarinus is drinking up the wine too quickly. The music starts again and they start dancing. Eventually Stichus suggests that they should call out Stephanium.

Stephanium, newly made up, comes to join them. Stichus suggests that they should all dance. They offer the piper more drink, telling him they need him to play some more licentious dance music.

=== The dances begin ===
- Act 5.6 (762–768): iambic senarii (7 lines)

The music stops for a few moments while the piper drinks again. Sangarinus starts to kiss Stephanium, both of them standing, while Stichus protests.

- Act 5.7 (769–775): mixed iambic metres (ia8, ia7, versreiz) (7 lines)

They begin dancing in a licentious way, whooping as they do so. After a while Stichus suggests they should go inside, and asks the audience to applaud.

== Translations ==
- English translation by Henry Thomas Riley at Perseus: Stichus
- Wolfang de Melo, 2013
