= Robert Anton =

English seventeen century author

Robert Anton or Anthony (fl. 1616) was an English poet and satirist.

== Life ==
Supposedly a son of George Anton, recorder of Lincoln, Robert Anton was born in St Leonard's, Foster Lane, London. He graduated B.A. from Magdalene College, Cambridge, in 1609–10. Ordained deacon in 1610, he became curate of Shalford, Surrey in 1616 and was ordained priest at Gloucester in 1618.

A unique quarto prose tract of Anton's, in black letter, entitled Moriomachia, imprinted at London by Simon Stafford, 1613, is preserved in Sir Charles Isham's library at Lamport Hall. Moriomachia – featuring a bull-turned-man engaging in mock-heroic battle over his armour at the court of Moropolis – was "one of the earliest English responses to Don Quixote". Anton was also the author of a quarto volume of satires, published in 1616, under the title of The Philosophers Satyrs. A second edition appeared in the following year, bearing the title Vices Anatomic Scourged and Corrected in New Satires. There are seven pieces, each being named after one of the seven planets (an idea borrowed from Ariosto). The chief interest of the book, which is written in curiously strained language, lies in the references to Beaumont, Spenser, Jonson, Chapman, and Daniel. One Shakespearean allusion occurs—"What Comedies of errors swell the stage", etc.
