= Academic drama =

Academic drama refers to a theatrical movement that emerged in the mid 16th century during the Renaissance. Dedicated to the study of classical dramas for the purpose of higher education, universities in England began to produce the plays of Sophocles, Euripides, and Seneca the Younger (among others) in the Greek and Roman languages, as well as neoclassical dramas. These classical and neoclassical productions were performed by young scholars at universities in Cambridge and Oxford. Other European countries, such as Spain and Italy, adapted classical plays into a mixture of Latin and vernacular dramas. These Spanish and Italian adaptations were used in teaching morals in schools and colleges. The intellectual development of dramas in schools, universities, and Inns of Court in Europe allowed the emergence of the great playwrights of the late 16th century.

== At Oxford University ==
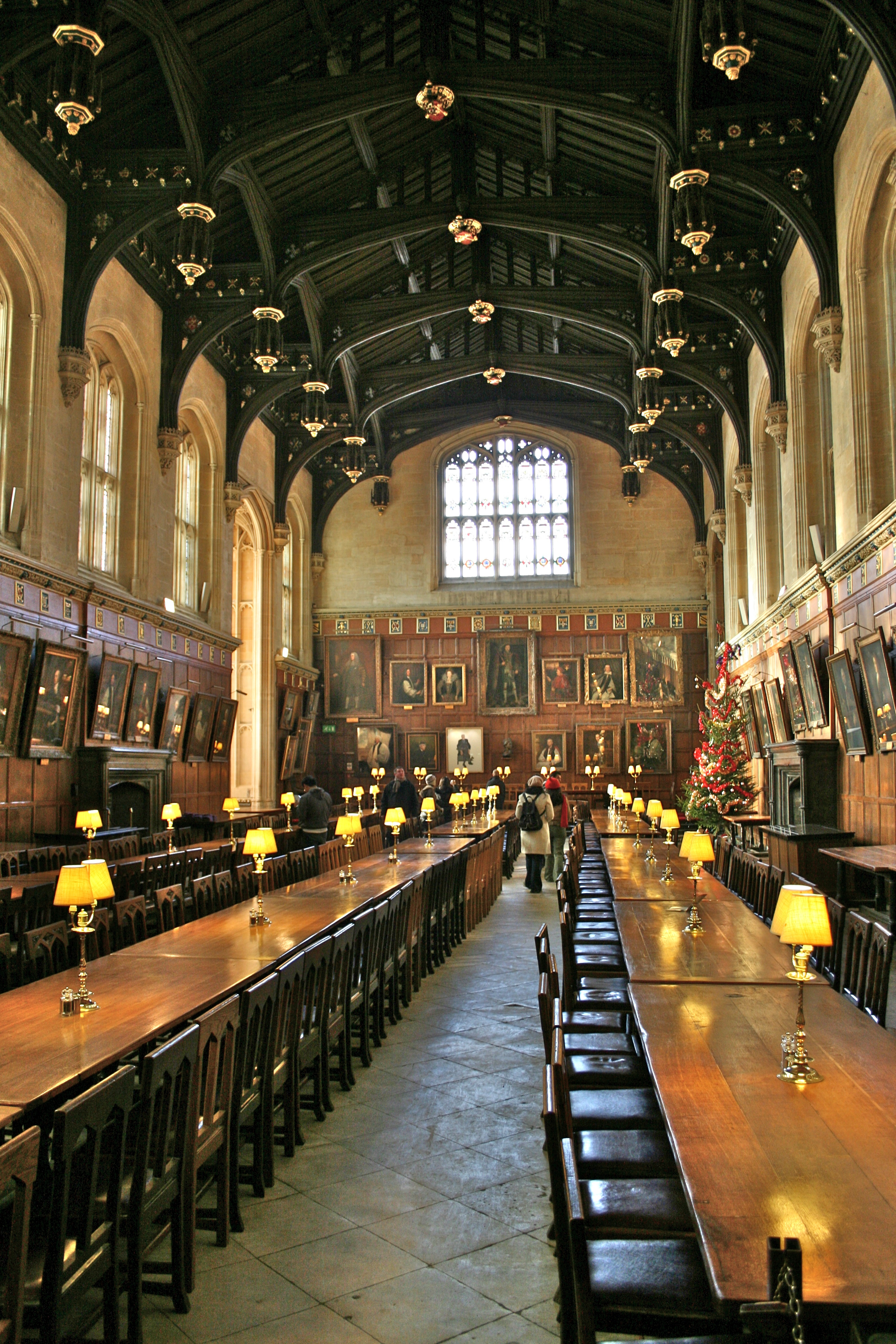
Hall of Christ Church, Oxford

The history of academic drama at Oxford University may be traced back to the mid 16th century. While there are records indicating dramatic performances were performed prior, dramatic production greatly increased in the 16th century. Academic dramas were performed in Christ Church and St. John's College at Oxford. The plays produced at Oxford were originally written in Latin, based on classical models. Used to teach playwriting and acting, these plays were written by both the students and instructors. In performance, audiences typically consisted of fellow students, though visits from royalty occasionally occurred. Among these royals were Queen Elizabeth I and King James I.

It is evident that academic drama at Oxford was highly regarded as a crucial part of the educational experience. The university covered all performance expenses. Additionally, no entrance fees were charged.

== At Cambridge University ==
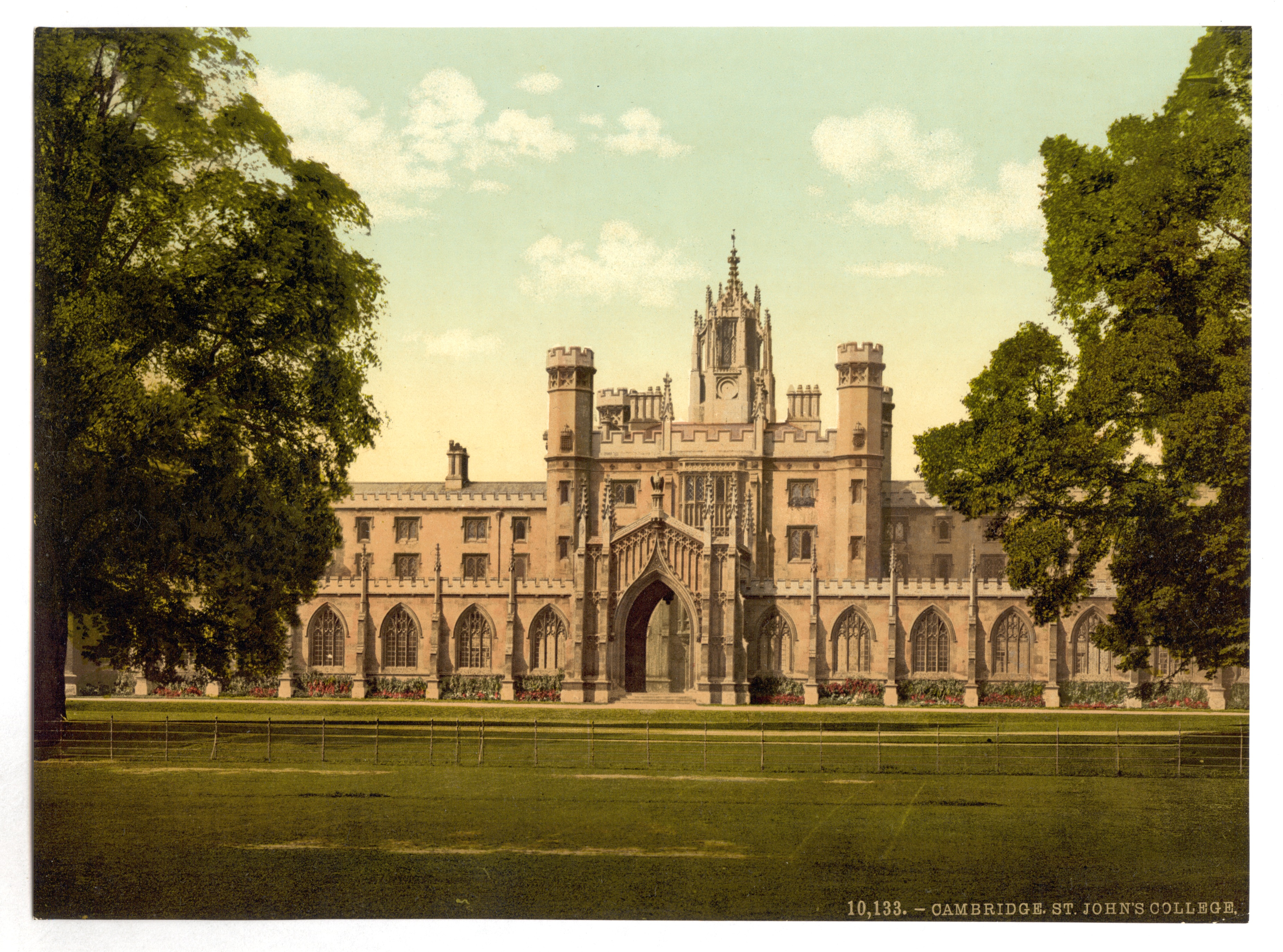
St. John's College, Cambridge, England-LCCN2002696460

In producing academic drama, the colleges at Cambridge University were decidedly confined to performing Latin works. When Queen Elizabeth I sent requests to both Cambridge and Oxford requesting the performance of an English comedy, she was met with a decline from Cambridge. Cambridge replied they did not use plays in English. Though Cambridge did not indulge the Queen with an English comedy, they were not opposed to Neo-Latin comedies. The majority of surviving English neo-Latin university dramas were performed at Cambridge. Performances at Cambridge were in Latin and the material of choice was the classics. Folios found at St. John's at Cambridge show records of costumes housed for performances. It is believed these costumes were used in the acting of classical works by Aristophanes and Terence, as well as in morality plays.

== At the Inns of Court ==
The Inns of Court are referred to as the third university of England. The Inns of Court were where practicing lawyers and law students gathered to eat, socialize, gain legal education, board, and be entertained. There were four of these Inns of Court: Gray's Inn, Inner Temple, Lincoln's Inn, and Middle Temple. In contrast to Cambridge and Oxford, who produced theatre as a literary study, the London Inns of Court produced theatre as a means of entertainment. Beginning around 1587, the Inns of Court produced masques and revels, yet another contrast from the Oxford and Cambridge plays. Until the end of the 17th century, these performances typically took the form of masques written by law students at the Inns of Court. Once the Inns of Court transitioned from masques to plays, the so-called third university served as a cradle for classical English drama. Eventually, by the early 17th century, writers such as Ben Jonson and William Shakespeare began producing English comedies at the Inns of Court, thus expanding the range of materials performed. After 1614, the masques were written and designed by professionals; simultaneously the new emerging dramas were written and performed by professional theatre practitioners. Due to the close proximity to the English court, nobility frequently attended the performances at the Inns of Court.

== Classical drama performed ==
Academic drama was formed as an educational tool, not only to advance the arts, but to teach classical literature and language. Key subject matter for performance were classical dramas of ancient Greece and Rome. Prominent playwrights whose works were performed as part of the academic drama tradition include Aristophanes, Plautus, Seneca the Younger, and Terence.

| Play | Playwright | Date Performed | Location of Performance | Language |
|---|---|---|---|---|
| Plutus | Aristophanes | 1536 | St. John's, Cambridge | Greek |
| Pax | Aristophanes | 1546 | Trinity, Cambridge | Greek |
| Poenulus | Plautus | 1549 | Queens', Cambridge | Latin |
| Troades | Seneca the younger | 1551–2 | Trinity, Cambridge | Latin |
| Menaechmi | Plautus | 1551–2 | Trinity, Cambridge | Latin |
| Stichus | Plautus | 1544 | Queens', Cambridge | Latin |
| a commedie | Plautus | 1557 | Trinity, Cambridge | Latin |
| Oedipus | Seneca the younger | 1559–60 | Trinity, Cambridge | Latin |
| Mostellaria | Plautus | 1559–60 | Trinity, Cambridge | Latin |
| Hecuba | Seneca the younger | 1559–60 | Trinity, Cambridge | Latin |
| Amphitruo | Plautus | 1560–1 | Trinity, Cambridge | Latin |
| Troades | Seneca the younger | 1560–1 | Trinity, Cambridge | Latin |
| Medea | Seneca the younger | 1560–1 | Trinity, Cambridge | Latin |
| Adelphi | Terence | 1562–3 | Jesus, Cambridge | Latin |
| Curculio | Plautus | 1562–3 | Jesus, Cambridge | Latin |
| Pseudolus | Plautus | 1562–3 | Trinity, Cambridge | Latin |
| Adelphi | Terence | 1562–3 | Trinity, Cambridge | Latin |
| Phormio | Terence | 1562–3 | Trinity, Cambridge | Latin |
| Medea | Seneca the younger | 1563 | Queens', Cambridge | Latin |
| Eunuchus | Terence | 1563–4 | Jesus, Cambridge | Latin |
| Trinummus | Plautus | 1563–4 | Trinity, Cambridge | Latin |
| Bacchides | Plautus | 1563–4 | Trinity, Cambridge | Latin |
| Aulularia | Plautus | 1563–4 | King's, Cambridge | Latin |
| Stichus | Plautus | 1564–5 | Trinity, Cambridge | Latin |
| Menaechmi | Plautus | 1565–6 | Trinity, Cambridge | Latin |
| Eunuchus | Terence | 1566–7 | Merton, Oxford | Latin |
| Menaechmi | Plautus | 1567–8 | Merton, Oxford | Latin |
| Bacchides | Plautus | 1579 | Jesus, Cambridge | Latin |
| Persa | Plautus | 1583 | St. John's, Cambridge | Latin |
| Hippolytus | Seneca the younger (with additional scenes by Gager) | 1591–2 | Christ Church, Oxford | Latin |

== Neo-Latin/English drama performed ==
Neo-Latin or New Latin dramas as they may also be referred to, were plays written in Latin by students and professors at Oxford, Cambridge, and the Inns of Court. Subject matter ranged from religious, to satirical, to mythological. Eventually these original plays began to be written in English, preparing the way for the English drama of the Elizabethan Age.

| Play | Playwright | Date Performed | Location of Performance | Language |
|---|---|---|---|---|
| Microcosmus | T. Artour | 1520–32 | St. John's, Cambridge | Latin |
| Mundas Plumbeus | T. Artour | 1520–32 | St. John's, Cambridge | Latin |
| Piscator siue Fraus Illusa | J. Hoker | 1535–43 | Magdalen, Oxford | Latin |
| Thersites | Anon. | 1537 | Magdalen, Oxford | English |
| Christus Rediuiuus | Nicholas Grimald | 1540 | Brasenose, Oxford | Latin |
| Christus Nascens | Nicholas Grimald | 1540– | Merton or Christ Chrich, Oxford | Latin |
| Protomartyr | Nicholas Grimald | 1540– | Merton or Christ Church, Oxford | Latin |
| Fama | Nicholas Grimald | 1540– | Merton or Christ Church, Oxford | Latin |
| Athanasius siue infamia | Nicholas Grimald | 1540– | Merton or Christ Church, Oxford | Latin |
| Troilus | Nicholas Grimald | 1540– | Merton or Christ Church, Oxford | English |
| De puerorum in musicis institutione | Nicholas Grimald | 1540– | Merton or Christ Church, Oxford | English |
| Absalon | T. Watson | c. 1540 | St. John's, Cambridge | Latin |
| dialogus | R. Textor | 1543 | Queens', Cambridge | Latin |
| Pammachius | T. Kirchmayer | 1545 | Christ's, Cambridge | Latin |
| Archiproheta | Nicholas Grimald | 1546–7 | Christ Church, Oxford | Latin |
| Heli | H. Ziegler | 1547–8 | Queens', Cambridge | Latin |
| Grammer Gurtons Nedle | undetermined | 1550–60 | Christ's, Cambridge | English |
| Strylius | Nicholas Robinson (bishop) | 1552–3 | Queens', Cambridge | Latin |
| A lernyd tragedy | Anon. | 1553–6 | New College, Oxford | Latin |
| de crumena perdita | Anon. | 1554–5 | Trinity, Cambridge | Latin |
| both the English plaies | Anon. | 1559–60 | Trinity, Cambridge | Latin |
| Sapientia Solomonis | Sixt Birck | 1559–60 | Trinity, Cambridge | Latin |
| Acolastus | Wilhelm Gnapheus | 1560–1 | Trinity, Cambridge | Latin |
| John babtiste | George Buchanan | 1562–3 | Trinity, Cambridge | Latin |
| Christus Triumphans | J. Foxe | 1562–3 | Trinity, Cambridge | Latin |
| Dido | E. Haliwell | 1564 | King's, Cambridge | Latin |
| Ezechias | Nicholas Udall | 1564 | King's, Cambridge | English |
| A burlesque on the Romanist bishops | Anon. | 1564 | At Hinchinbrook, Cambridge | English |
| Philanira | C. Roilletus | 1564–5 | Trinity, Cambridge | Latin |
| Asotus | Macropedius | 1565–6 | Trinity, Cambridge | Latin |
| Crumenaria | Anon. | 1565–6 | Trinity, Cambridge | Latin |
| Marcus Geminus | Anon. | 1566 | Christ Church, Oxford | Latin |
| Palamon and Arcyte Parts 1 and 2 | Richard Edwardes | 1566 | Christ Church, Oxford | Latin |
| Progne | James Calfhill | 1566 | Christ Church, Oxford | Latin |
| Iephthes | J. Christopherson | 1566–7 | Trinity, Cambridge | Latin |
| Wylie Beguylie | Anon. | 1566–7 | Merton, Oxford | English |
| Damon and Pythias (play) | Richard Edwardes | 1567–8 | Merton, Oxford | English |
| The Destruction of Thebes | Anon. | 1569 | Christ Church, Oxford | Latin |
| Hymenaeus | Abraham Fraunce or H. Hickman | c. 1578–9 | St. John's, Cambridge | Latin |
| Victoria | Abraham Fraunce | 1579–83 | St. John's, Cambridge | Latin |
| Richardus Tertius | Thomas Legge | 1579–80 | St. John's, Cambridge | Latin |
| The Destruction of Jerusalem | Thomas Legge | 1580–98 | Caius, Cambridge | Latin |
| Pendantius | A. Wingfield | 1580–1 | Trinity, Cambridge | Latin |
| Puer vapulans | Anon. | 1581–2 | Jesus, Cambridge | Latin |
| Supposes | G. Gascoigne | 1581–2 | Trinity, Oxford | English |
| Caesar Interfectus | R. Eedes | 1581–2 | Christ Church, Oxford | Latin |
| Meleager | W. Gager | 1581–2 | Christ Church, Oxford | Latin |
| Bellum Grammaticale | Leonard Hutten | c. 1582 | Christ Church, Oxford | Latin |
| Comedy satirizing the Mayor of Cambridge | T. Mudde | 1582–3 | Pembroke, Oxford | English |
| Riuales | W. Gager | 1583 | Christ Church, Oxford | Latin |
| Dido | W. Gager | 1583 | Christ Church, Oxford | Latin |
| Meleager | W. Gager | 1584–5 | Christ Church, Oxford | Latin |
| Tarrarantantara turba trigonum Tri-Harueyorum | Anon. | 1585–6 | Clare Hall, Cambridge | Latin |
| Duns furens | Anon. | 1585–6 | Peterhouse, Cambridge | Latin |
| Terminus et non terminus | Thomas Nashe and other student | c. 1586 | St. John's, Cambridge | Latin |
| Octavia | pseudo-Senecan | 1588 | Christ Church, Oxford | Latin |
| Vlysses Redux | W. Gager | 1591–2 | Christ Church, Oxford | Latin |
| Bellum Grammaticale | Leonard Hutten | 1592 | Christ Church, Oxford | Latin |
| Roxana | W. Alabaster | c. 1592 | Trinity, Cambridge | Latin |
| Caesars Reuenge | Anon. | c. 1594 | Trinity, Oxford | Latin |
| Laelia | Anon. | 1594–5 | Queens', Cambridge | Latin |
| Siluanus | Anon. | 1596–7 | St. John's, Cambridge | Latin |
| Hispanus | Anon. | 1596–7 | St. John's, Cambridge | Latin |
| Machiauellus | Anon. | 1597 | St. John's, Cambridge | Latin |
| The Pilgrimage to Parnassus Parnassus plays | Anon. | 1598 | St. John's, Cambridge | English |
| Leander | W. Hawkesworth | 1598–9 | Trinity, Cambridge | Latin |
| Club Law | G. Ruggle | 1599–1600 | Clare Hall, Cambridge | English |
| The Return from Parnassus Part I Parnassus plays | Anon. | 1601 | St. John's, Cambridge | English |
| The Return from Parnassus Part II Parnassus plays | Anon. | 1602 | St. John's, Cambridge | English |
| Narcissus | Anon. | 1602–3 | St. John's, Oxford | English |
| Leander | W. Hawkesworth | 1602–3 | Trinity, Cambridge | Latin |
| Labyrinthus | W. Hawkesworth | 1602–3 | Trinity, Cambridge | Latin |
| Nero | M. Gwynne | 1602–3 | St. John's, Oxford | Latin |

== See also ==
- Jesuit drama
- Studentes, a German Neo-Latin play written for similar purposes
