= Thomas Tomkis =

16th/17th-century English playwright

Thomas Tomkis (or Tomkys) (c. 1580 – 1634) was an English playwright of the late Elizabethan and the Jacobean eras and, arguably, one of the more cryptic figures of English Renaissance drama.

== Biography ==
Thomas Tomkis (the spelling of Tomkis/Tomkys varies) was the son of a Staffordshire clergyman, John Tomkys, who became the Public Preacher at St Mary's Church, Shrewsbury from 1582 until his death in 1592. Thomas (along with his two brothers), was educated at the Shrewsbury School before matriculating at Trinity College, Cambridge in 1597. There, Tomkis earned his Bachelor of Arts degree in 1600, and his Master of Arts degree in 1604; he became a minor fellow of Trinity College in 1602, and a major fellow in 1604. He remained at the college until 1610, when he moved to Wolverhampton and set up a successful legal practice. His college called him back five years later, to prepare an entertainment of King James I.

Thomas married Margaret Cresswell and together had three boys and a girl. Thomas died in Wolverhampton in September 1634 and is buried at St Peter's Collegiate church, Wolverhampton.

== Writing ==
Tomkis is credited with two academic plays of the early seventeenth century: Lingua (published 1607) and Albumazar (published 1615). He is also regarded as a likely author of Pathomachia (published 1630). Tomkis represented an important break in the academic drama of the two universities, as he wrote in English rather than the traditional Latin. The accessibility of his works facilitated their popularity: Lingua was printed in six editions between 1607 and 1657, while Albumazar went through five editions between 1615 and 1668. More speculatively, Tomkis has been suggested as the possible author of two entertainments, Ruff, Cuff, and Band and Work for Cutlers (both published 1615), and the academic morality play Locus, Corpus, Motus (c. 1604/5).

The nineteenth-century critic F. G. Fleay attempted to link Tomkis with the Tomkins family of prominent musicians in his era, Thomas Tomkins and his son John Tomkins, however Fleay's argument is recognized as speculative and incorrect.
