= Barten Holyday =

English clergyman, author and poet

- Archdeacon of Oxford
- Appointed: 1626

Personal details
- Born: 1593
- Died: 2 October 1661 (aged 67–68) Iffley, Oxfordshire, England
- Education: Christ Church, Oxford (DDiv)

Barten Holyday or Holiday (1593 – 2 October 1661) was an English clergyman, author and poet.

== Life ==
Holyday was educated at Christ Church, Oxford and earned a Doctor of Divinity degree. Holyday travelled with Sir Francis Stewart on Stewart's mission to Spain; he owed his introduction to Stewart to Richard Corbet. Holyday formed part of the escort of Count Gondomar returning to Spain.

In 1619 Holyday was ordained deacon, and in 1621 priest. In 1623 he became vicar of Ashleworth and Brize Norton.

For the 1625 accession day of King James I, Holyday preached at St Paul's Cross a political sermon on unity. It was in marked contrast to a sermon preached at the same period by the royal chaplain Daniel Price that hinted at religious divisions fostered at court. Holyday was appointed Archdeacon of Oxford by King Charles I in 1625.

Holyday died at Iffley on 2 October 1661, "of an Ague, or of the new Epidemical Disease which now raged." He was buried at Christchurch Cathedral, Oxford.

== Works ==
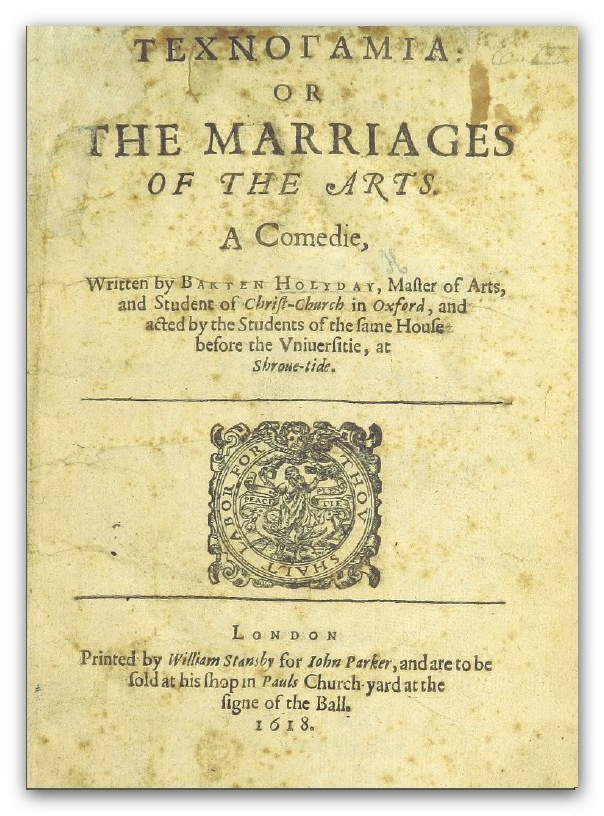
Technogamia, title page

Holyday was summed up by Adolphus William Ward as "a good scholar, a shrewd critic, and a fair wit."

- Published a verse translation of Persius.
- Technogamia (published 1618) was Holyday's only play. It was given at Christ Church in 1617, without being a success. Possibly after Ben Jonson had revised it, the play was given again at Woodstock for James I. Its less than enthusiastic reception by the King was the subject of a derisory poem called "Whoop Holiday", published in 1625 by Peter Heylin. John Nichols suggested that the title was a play on "Whoop Barnaby", a ballad of the time. Holyday wrote commendatory verse for the publisher John Benson for a 1640 edition of Ars Poetica in Jonson's translation. A modern edition of Technogamia was published in 1642.
- Philosophiae polito-barbarae specimen, in quo De anima & ejus habitibus intellectualibus quaestiones aliquot: libris duobus (1633) The works, relating to Aristotle, date from the period about 1617 to 1620, when Holyday was a college praelector in rhetoric and philosophy.
- Against Disloyalty: Fower Sermons Preach'd in the Times of the Late Troubles (1661). Includes "On Rebellion" preached on 19 May 1644 in the University Church of St Mary the Virgin, just before the siege of Oxford.
- A Survey of the World, in Verse (1661), in 1000 couplets.
- Decimus Junius Juvenalis, and Aulus Persius Flaccus Translated and Illustrated, as Well with Sculpture as Notes (1673). With a letter of 1618 from his friend Thomas Farnaby. The Juvenal translation dates from 1616.

Holyday also translated the Odes of Horace, and wrote sermons. Of the poets Thomas May, George Sandys and Holyday as translators, Samuel Johnson wrote in The Idler that

[...] they confined themselves to the toil of rendering line for line, not indeed with equal felicity, for May and Sandys were poets, and Holiday only a scholar and a critic.

When Holyday in 1616 wrote of his "moderate paraphrase" as translator, against pedantry, he presaged a later attitude of John Denham.

== Family ==
Holyday married, firstly in 1628, Elizabeth Wickham; they had three sons and two daughters. After her death, he married secondly in 1649 the widow Margaret Sheppard, previously married to the Rev. Francis Dewey, a Christ Church graduate; they had a son and a daughter.
