= Albumazar =

Play by Thomas Tomkis

Albumazar is a Jacobean era play, a comedy written by Thomas Tomkis that was performed and published in 1615.

== Productions ==
The play was specially commissioned by Trinity College, Cambridge to entertain King James I during his 1615 visit to the University. College officials sought a play from alumnus Tomkis, then a lawyer in Wolverhampton, who had written the successful Lingua for his college a decade earlier. Gentlemen of Trinity College acted Albumazar before the King and his court on 9 March 1615 (new style). One report on this production from an audience member survives, in a letter from John Chamberlain to Dudley Carleton – though Chamberlain thought it a failure.

The play was revived onstage during the Restoration by the Duke's Company at their Lincoln's Inn Fields theatre; Samuel Pepys saw a production on 22 February 1668. In 1744, playwright James Ralph adapted Tomkis's play into his The Astrologer, though it was not a success and ran for one performance only. In 1747, David Garrick revived Tomkis's original, and in 1773 Garrick made and staged his own adaptation.

== Synopsis ==
Two elderly gentlemen, Antonio and Pandulfo, have formed an agreement to marry each other's daughters, Flavia and Sulpitia. Prior to the marriage, Antonio sails to Barbary to access his hoard of gold; but he does not return in time for the ceremony. Pandulfo is mad to have Flavia, but is frustrated by the resistance of the girl and her brother Lelio. (Pandulfo is sixty; Flavia is sixteen.) Desperate for help, Pandulfo consults Albumazar the astrologer.

Albumazar, however, is a fraud and confidence man, in league with a band of thieves. He bamboozles his victims with verbose gibberish ("excentricals, / Centers, concentrics, circles, and epicycles," and "with scioferical instrument, / By way of azimuth and almicantarath," and "Necro-puro-geo-hydro-cheiro-coscinomancy," and much more) while setting them up to be robbed by his confederates. Albumazar convinces Pandulfo that he can transform the tenant farmer Trincalo into a double of Antonio for twenty-four hours; while in this form, Trincalo can deliver Flavia.

The foolish Trincalo actually believes in the transformation, which gives the thieves opportunity to trick and abuse him. Matters become more complex when the genuine Antonio returns from his adventures; he is mistaken for Trincalo, much to his confusion and distress. The old man establishes his identity, though, and expresses his regret at the marriage agreement he'd entered into with Pandulfo. The young people and Antonio trick Pandulfo into agreeing to a new bargain: Antonio's son Lelio and Pandulfo's son Eugenio marry the girls in place of their fathers.

The thieves have relieved the distracted Pandulfo of three thousand pounds' worth of his property; but in their greed they cut Albumazar out of any share in the loot. The chastened astrologer turns them in; Pandulfo regains his wealth, which moderates his resentment at his loss of Flavia. Albumazar is forgiven.

(The play also contains Tomkis's Prologue, in which he states that he chose to write the work in English rather than Latin, the language of most academic plays, because of the increasing number of women in the audience.)

== Publication ==
Albumazar was entered into the Stationers' Register on 28 April 1615, and was published soon after in a quarto printed by Nicholas Okes for the bookseller Walter Burre. (The 1615 quarto was issued in two states, which have sometimes been defined as two separate editions.) The play is anonymous in its first edition, though college records clearly assign it to Tomkis. A second edition was issued in 1634 by Nicholas Okes (also in two states); that edition claims to have been "Newly revised and corrected by a special Hand," though the changes in the text amount to little more than normal proofreading and correction of errors. A new edition was published by Thomas Dring in 1668 to coincide with the Restoration revival. Ralph's and Garrick's adaptations both were published, in 1744 and 1773 respectively.

Though consensus scholarship accepts the attribution of Albumazar to Tomkis, a few individual commentators have proposed alternative hypotheses of authorship – one even assigning the play to Shakespeare. None of these alternatives has won scholarly approval.

== Sources ==
The protagonist of the play is based on a historical figure named Ja'far ibn Muhammad Abu Ma'shar al-Balkhi, known in the West as Albumazar; he was a ninth-century mathematician and philosopher who also worked as an astrologer (just as Johannes Kepler cast horoscopes while revolutionising astronomy). Tomkis based his dramatic treatment on the play L'Astrologo by Giambattista della Porta, a work first published in Venice in 1606. Tomkis's play also shows debts to Ben Jonson's The Alchemist and Shakespeare's The Tempest (the character name Trincalo in Tomkis's play derives from Trinculo in Shakespeare's).

When John Dryden wrote the Prologue for the 1668 revival of Albumazar, he got the relationship between the Tomkis and Jonson plays backwards, and accused Jonson of borrowing from Tomkis.

== The "perspicill" ==
In addition to purely literary sources, Tomkis also exploited Galileo Galilei's revolutionary book on his astronomical discoveries, Sidereus Nuncius, "The Starry Messenger" (1610). Galileo referred to the telescope as the "perspicillum," a term that Tomkis Anglicized into "perspicill." (The earliest English commentators on Galileo wrote before the telescope had even acquired its name; in his 1620 masque News from the New World Discovered in the Moon, Jonson called the instrument a "trunk," or tube.) In keeping with his satirical intent, Tomkis gives a fanciful rather than realistic portrayal of the telescope, describing it as "an engine to catch starres" and "arrest" planets in their motions. Looking through it, a man in London can allegedly see Dover. When a character looks into the perspicill, he is amazed to view a richly-dressed crowd – which is the audience watching the performance of the play.

In a related flight of fancy, Tomkis's fraudulent astrologer produces a comparable instrument for extending the range of human hearing, which he calls the "otacousticon" – and which turns out to be an artificial pair of ass's ears. Albumazar also claims to possess a "wind instrument" that speaks ten languages.

== Influences ==
Oliver Goldsmith borrowed one plot element (a robbery) from Albumazar for his 1772 play She Stoops to Conquer.

Because of Tomkis's play and its adaptations, the name Albumazar came to be used as a generic term for an astrologer. It is employed in this sense in William Congreve's Love for Love (1695) and in Tobias Smollett's The Adventures of Peregrine Pickle (1751).
