= List of Shakespeare plays in quarto =

Nineteen of William Shakespeare's plays first appeared in quarto before the publication of the First Folio in 1623, eighteen of those before his death in 1616. One play co-authored with John Fletcher, The Two Noble Kinsmen, was first published in 1634, and one play first published in the First Folio, The Taming of the Shrew, was later published in quarto. Following are listed the Shakespeare plays that appeared in quarto up to 1642 with complete title page information from each edition.

== Plays first published before 1623 ==
=== Henry VI, Part 2 ===
Q1 1594

THE | First part of the Con= | tention betwixt the two famous Houses of Yorke | and Lancaster, with the death of the good | Duke Humphrey: | And the banishment and death of the Duke of | Suffolke, and the Tragicall end of the proud Cardinall | of VVinchester, vvith the notable Rebellion | of Iacke Cade: | And the Duke of Yorkes first claime vnto the | Crowne. | LONDON | Printed by Thomas Creed, for Thomas Millington, | and are to be sold at his shop vnder Saint Peters | Church in Cornwall. | 1594.

The play known as King Henry VI, Part 2 was entered into the Stationers Register 12 March 1594 and printed that same year by Thomas Creede for Thomas Millington. As it appears in the First Folio, the play is about a third longer than the first quarto version. Most scholars agree that the 1594 version as printed is a memorial reconstruction, or bad quarto, but they are divided as to whether it is based on the full folio version or an abridged and possibly revised version of the play. STC 26099; 64 pages.

Q2 1600

THE | First part of the Con- | tention betwixt the two famous hou- | ses of Yorke and Lancaster, with the | death of the good Duke | Humphrey: And the banishment and death of the Duke of | Suffolke, and the Tragical end of the prowd Cardinall | of Winchester, with the notable Rebellion of | Iacke Cade: | And the Duke of Yorkes first clayme to the | Crowne. | LONDON | Printed by Valentine Simmes for Thomas Millington, and | are to be sold at his shop vnder S. Peters Church | in Cornewall. | 1600.

Q3 1619 (not dated, printed with Henry VI, Part 3 as part of Thomas Pavier's False Folio)

THE Whole Contention | betvveene the two Famous | Houses, LANCASTER and | YORKE. | With the Tragicall ends of the good Duke | Humfrey, Richard Duke of Yorke, | and King Henrie the | sixt. | Diuided into two Parts: And newly corrected and | enlarged. Written by William Shake- | speare, Gent. | Printed at LONDON, for T. P.

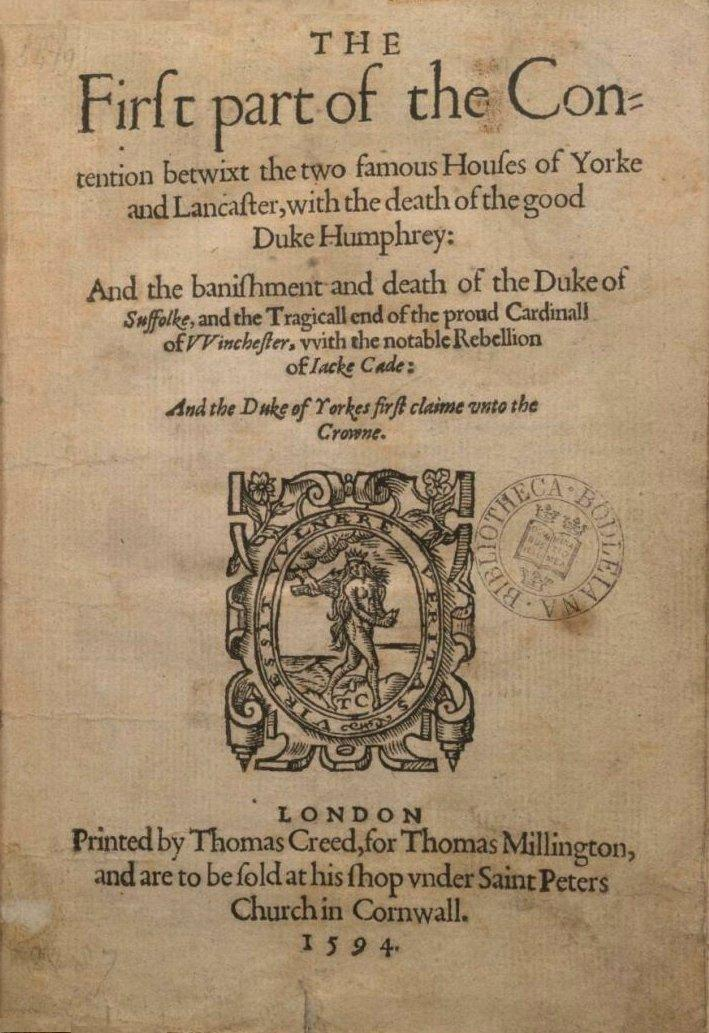
Q1 1594.

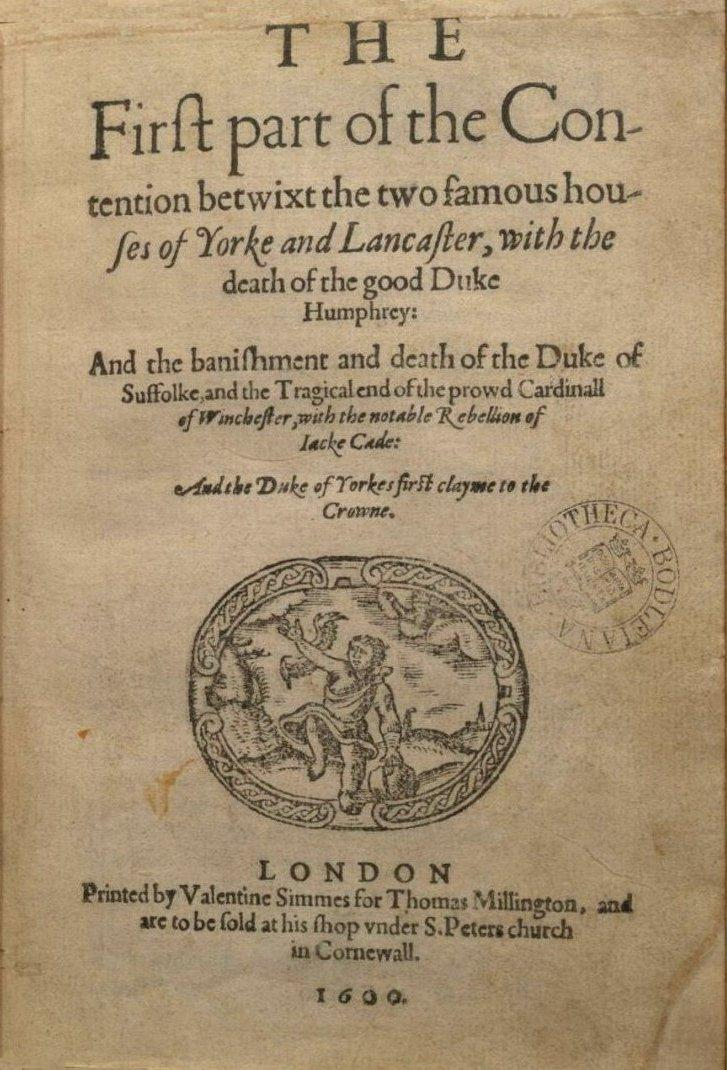
Q2 1600

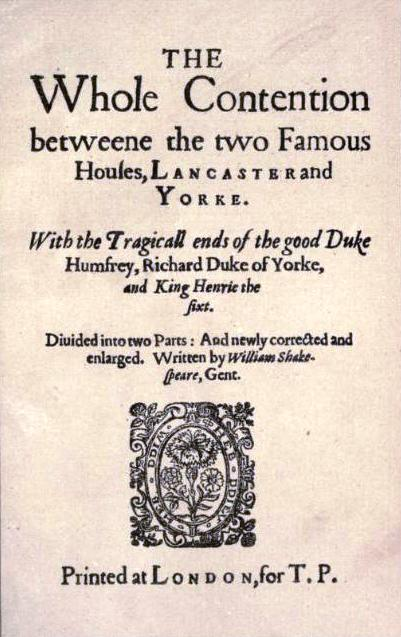
Q3 1619.

=== Titus Andronicus ===
Q1 1594

THE | MOST LA- | mentable Romaine | Tragedie of Titus Andronicus: | As it was Plaide by the Right Ho- | nourable the Earle of Darbie, Earle of Pembrooke, | and Earle of Sussex their Seruants. | LONDON, | Printed by Iohn Danter, and are | to be sold by Edward White & Thomas Millington, | at the little North doore of Paules at the | signe of the Gunne. | 1594.

Q2 1600

The most lamenta- | ble Romaine Tragedie of Titus | Andronicus. | As it hath sundry times beene playde by the | Right Honourable the Earle of Pembrooke, the | Earle of Darbie, the Earle of Sussex, and the | Lorde Chamberlaine theyr | Seruants. | AT LONDON | Printed by I. R. for Edward White | and are to bee sold at his shoppe, at the little | North doore of Paules, at the signe of | the Gun. 1600.

Q3 1611

THE | MOST LAMEN- | TABLE TRAGEDIE | of Titus Andronicus. | AS IT HATH SVNDRY | times beene plaide by the Kings | Maiesties Seruants. | LONDON, | Printed for Eedward White, and are to be solde | at his shoppe, nere the little North dore of | Pauls, at the signe of the | Gun. 1611.

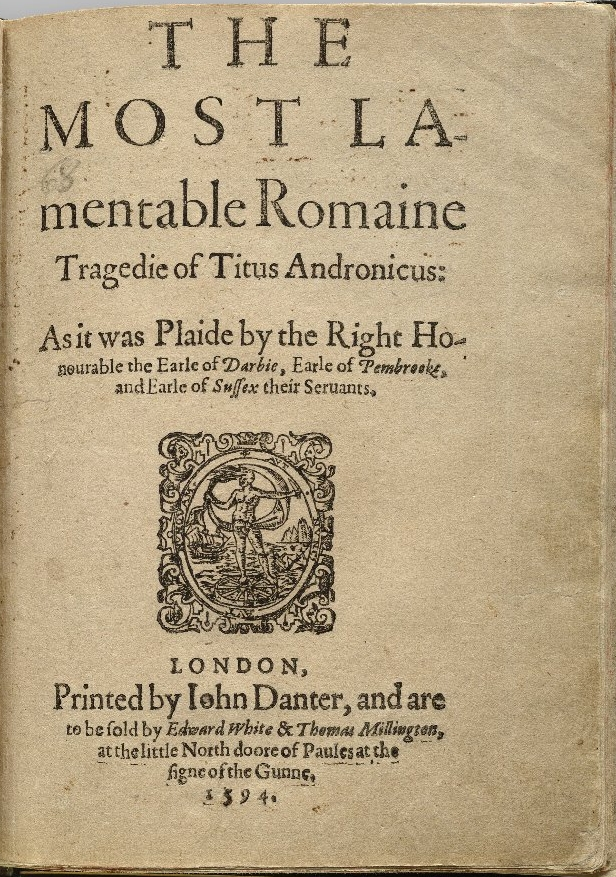
Q1 1594.

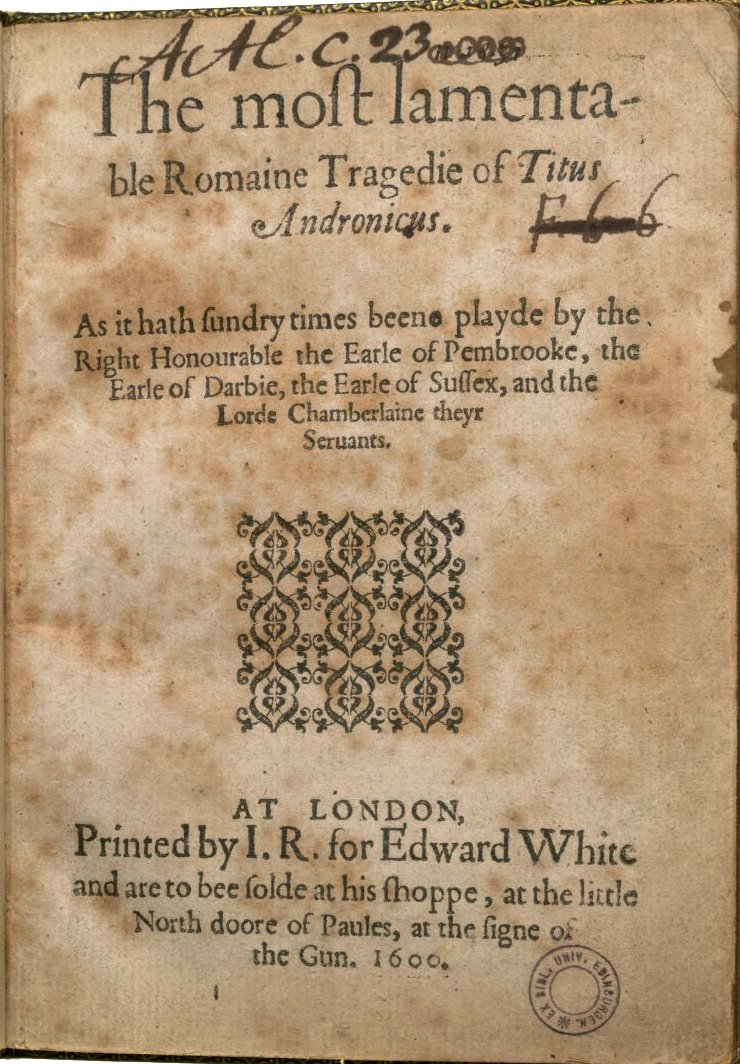
Q2 1600.

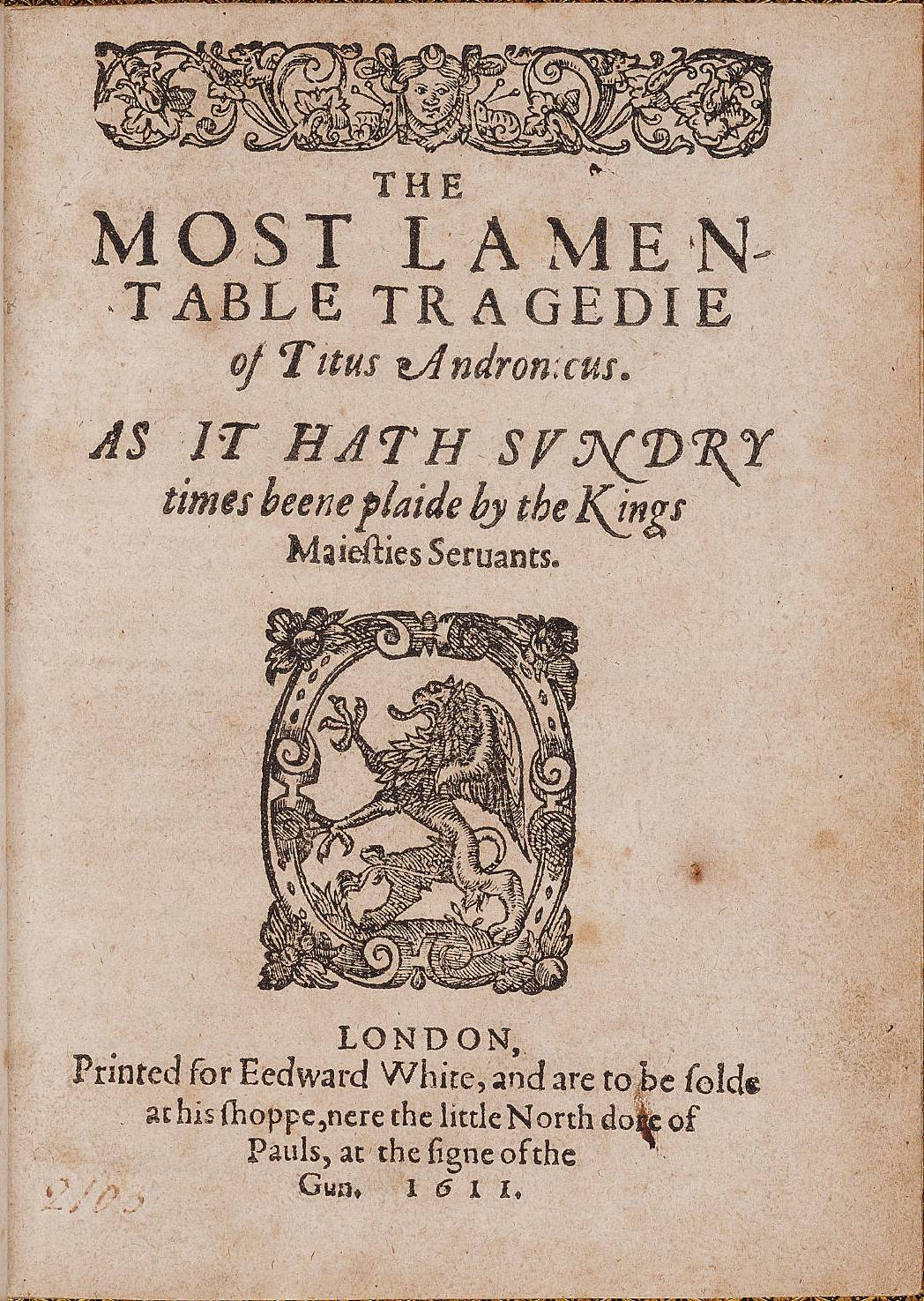
Q3 1611.

=== Richard III ===
Q1 1597

THE TRAGEDY OF | King Richard the third. | Containing, | His treacherous Plots against his brother Clarence: | the pittiefull murther of his iunocent nephewes: | his tyrannicall vsurpation: with the whole course | of his detested life, and most deserued death. | As it hath been lately Acted by the | Right honourable the Lord Chamber- | laine his seruants. | AT LONDON | Printed by Valentine Sims, for Andrew Wise, | dwelling in Paules Chuch-yard, at the | Signe of the Angell. | 1597.

Q2 1598

THE | TRAGEDIE | of King Richard | the third. | Conteining his treacherous Plots against his | brother Clarence: the pitiful murther of his innocent | Nephewes: his tyrannicall vsurpation: with | the whole course of the detested life, and most | deserued death. | As it hath beene lately Acted by the Right honourable | the Lord Chamberlaine his seruants. | By William Shake-speare. | LONDON | Printed by Thomas Creede, for Andrew Wise, | dwelling in Paules Church-yard, at the signe | of the Angell. 1598.

Q3 1602

THE | TRAGEDIE | of King Richard | the third. | Conteining his treacherous Plots against his brother | Clarence: the pittifull murther of his innocent Ne- | phewes: his tyrannicall vsurpation: with the | whole course of the detested life, and | most deserued death. | As it hath bene lately Acted by the Right honourable | the Lord Chamberlaine his seruants. | Newly augmented, | By William Shakespeare. | LONDON | Printed by Thomas Creede, for Andrew Wise, dwelling | in Paules Church-yard, at the signe of the | Angell. 1602.

Q4 1605

THE | TRAGEDIE | of King Richard | the third. | Conteining his treacherous Plots against his brother | Clarence: the pittifull murther of his innocent Ne- | phewes: his tyrannicall vsurpation: with the | whole course of the detested life, and | most deserued death. | As it hath bin lately Acted by the Right Honourable | the Lord Chamberlaine his seruants. | Newly augmented, | By William Shakespeare. | LONDON | Printed by Thomas Creede, and are to be sold by Mathew | Lawe, dwelling in Paules Church-yard, at the Signe | of the Foxe, neare S. Austins gate, 1605.

Q5 1612

THE | TRAGEDIE | of King Richard | the third. | Containing his treacherous Plots against his brother | Clarence : the pittifull murther of his innocent Ne- | phewes : his tyrannicall vsurpation : with the | whole course of the detested life, and | most deserued death. | As it hath beene lately Acted by the Kings Maiesties | seruants. | Newly augmented, | By William Shake-speare. | LONDON, | Printed by Thomas Creede, and are to be sold by Mathew | Lawe, dwelling in Pauls Church-yard, at the Signe | of the Foxe, neare S. Austins gate, 1612.

Q6 1622

THE | TRAGEDIE | OF | KING RICHARD | THE THIRD. | Contayning his treacherous plots against | his brother Clarence : The pittifull murder of his innocent | Nephewes : his tyrannicall Vsurpation : with the whole | course of his detested life, and most | deserued death. | As it hath been lately acted by the Kings Maiesties | Seruants. | Newly augmented. | By William Shake-speare. | LONDON, | Printed by Thomas Purfoot, and are to be sold by Mathew Law, dwelling | in Pauls Church-yard, at the Signe of the Foxe, neere | S. Austines gate, 1622.

Q7 1629

THE | TRAGEDIE | OF | KING RICHARD | THE THIRD. | Contayning his treacherous plots against | his brother Clarence : The pittifull murder of his ino- | cent Nephewes : his tiranous vsurpation : with the whole | course of his detested life, and most | deserued death. | As it hath been lately Acted by the Kings Maiesties | Seruants. | Newly augmented. | By William Shake-speare. | LONDON. | Printed by Iohn Norton, and are to be sold by Mathew Law, | dwelling in Pauls Church-yeard, at the Signe of the | Foxe, neere St. Austines gate, | 1629.

Q8 1634

THE | TRAGEDIE | OF | KING RICHARD | THE THIRD. | Contayning his treacherous Plots a- | gainst his brother Clarence : The pitifull | murder of his innocent Nephewes : his | tyranous vsurpation : with the | whole course of his detested life, | and most deserued death. | As it hath beene Acted by the Kings | Maiesties Seruants. | VVritten by William Shake-speare. | LONDON. | Printed by IOHN NORTON. 1634.

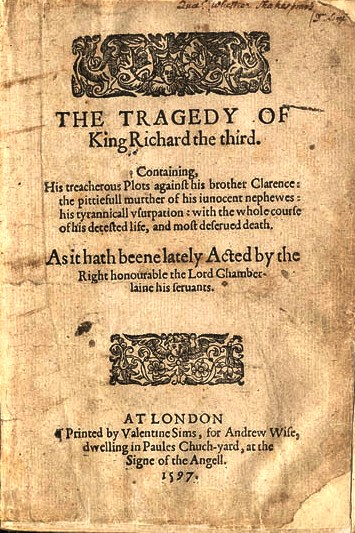
Q1 1597

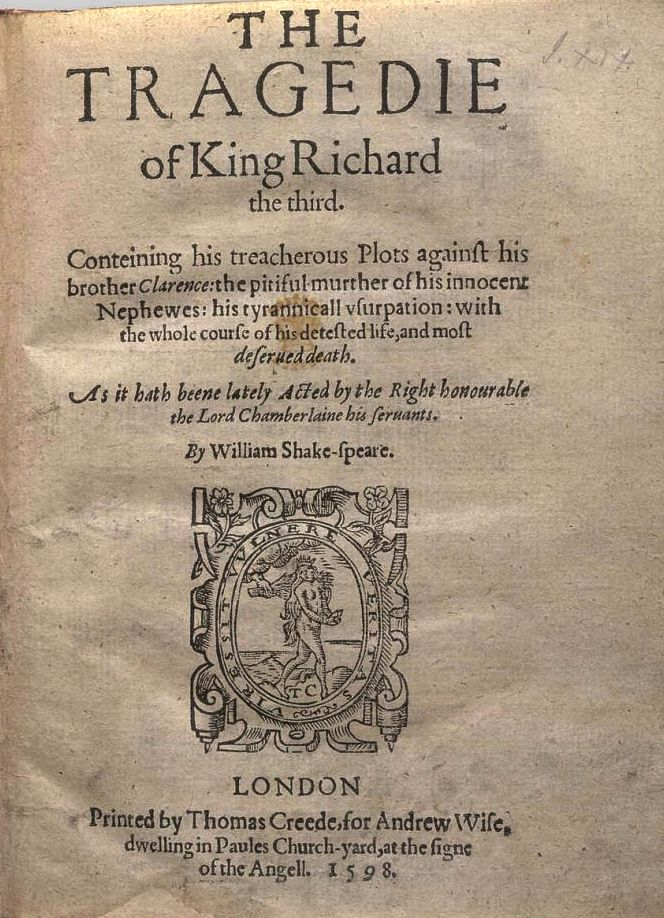
Q2 1598

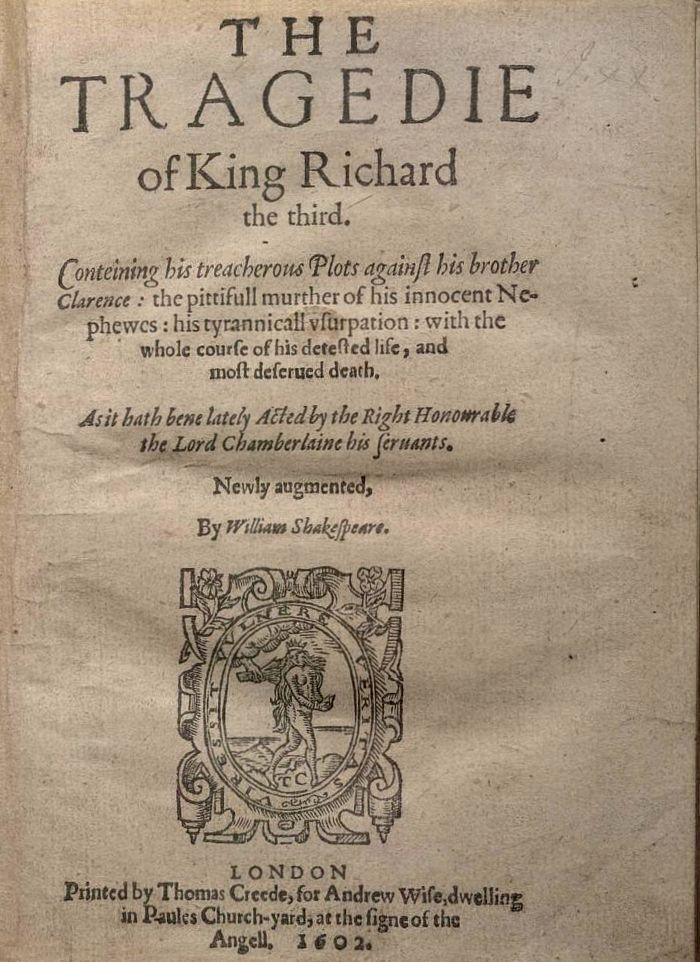
Q3 1602

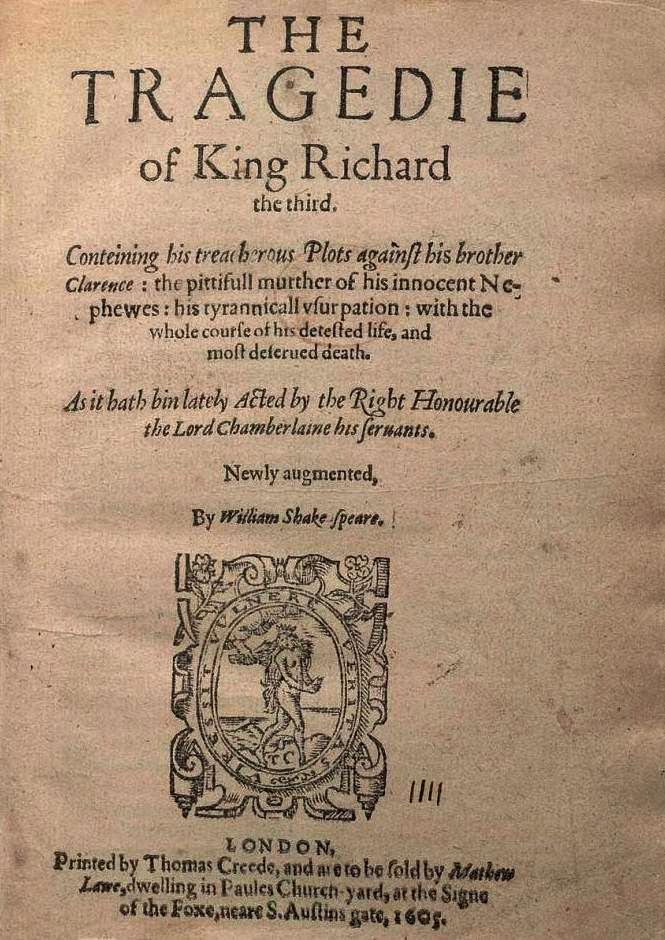
Q4 1605

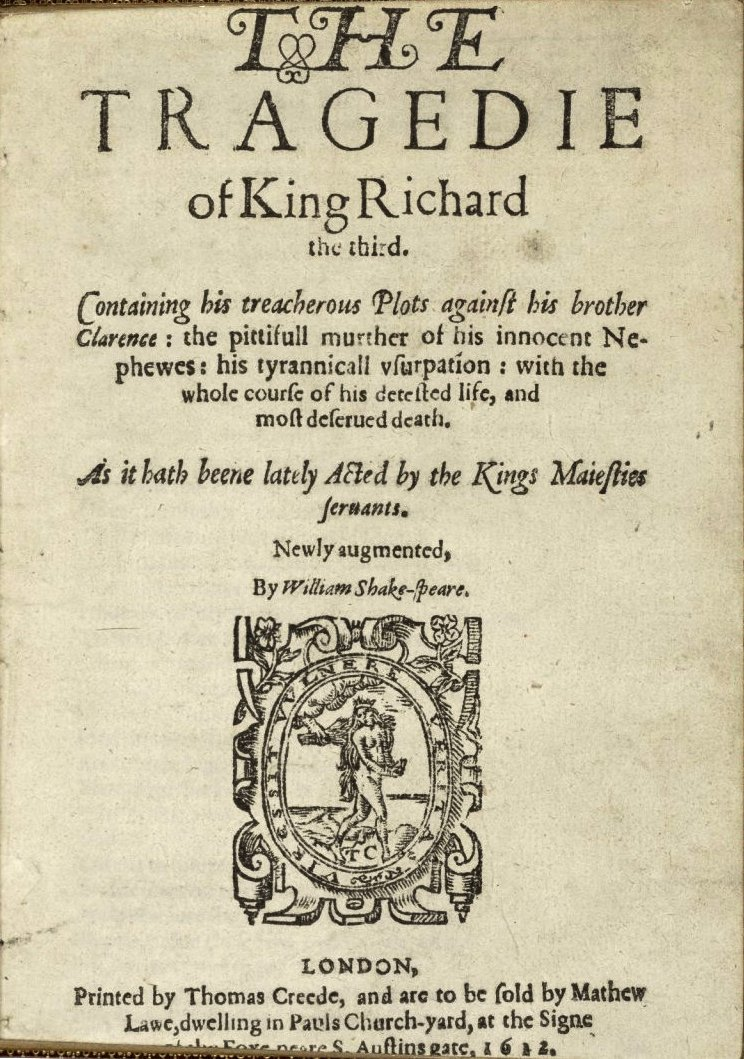
Q5 1612

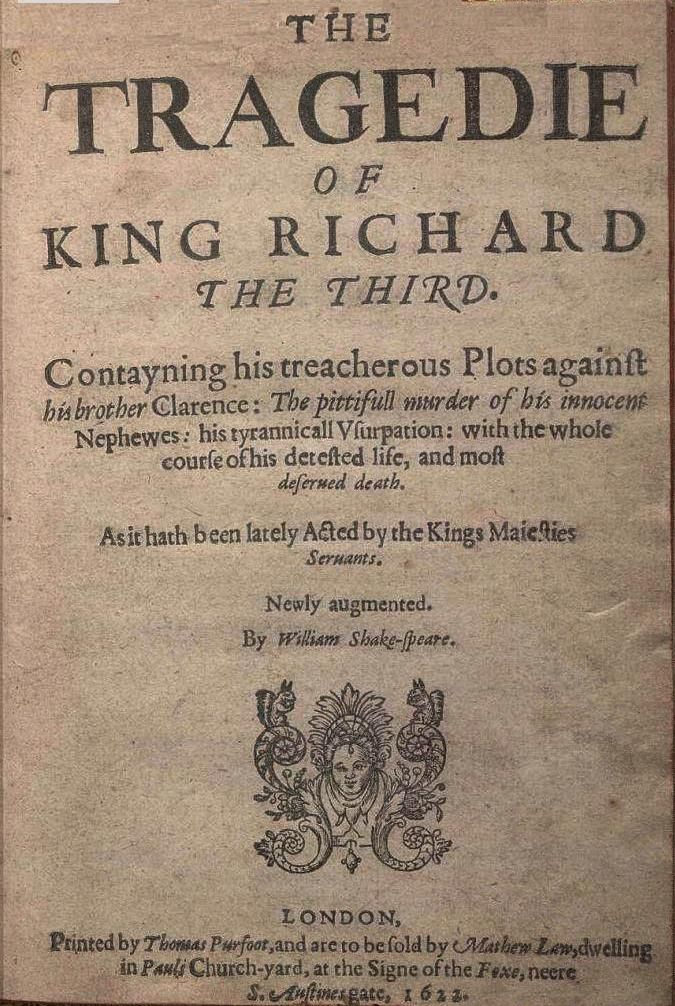
Q6 1622

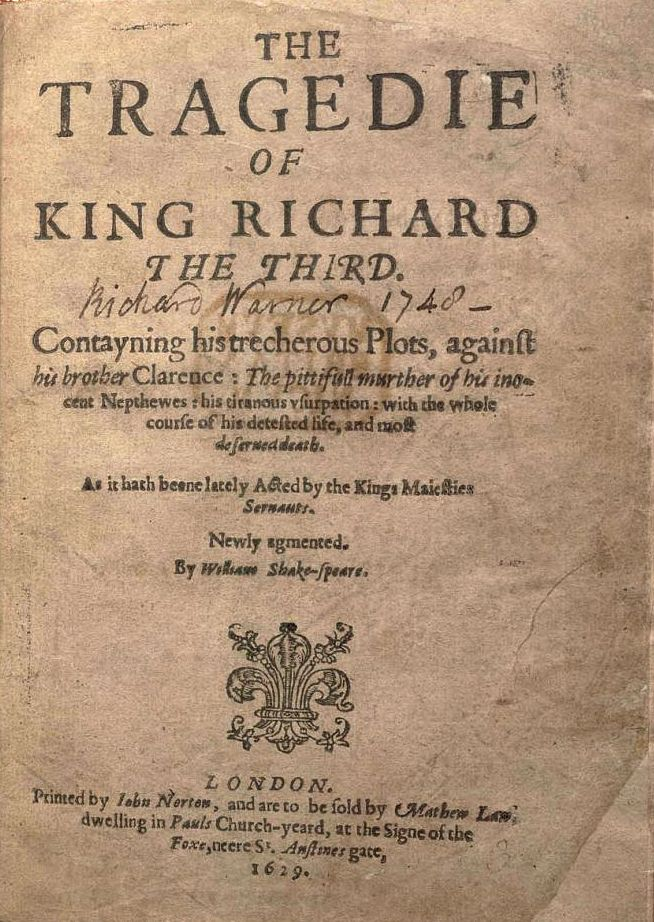
Q7 1629

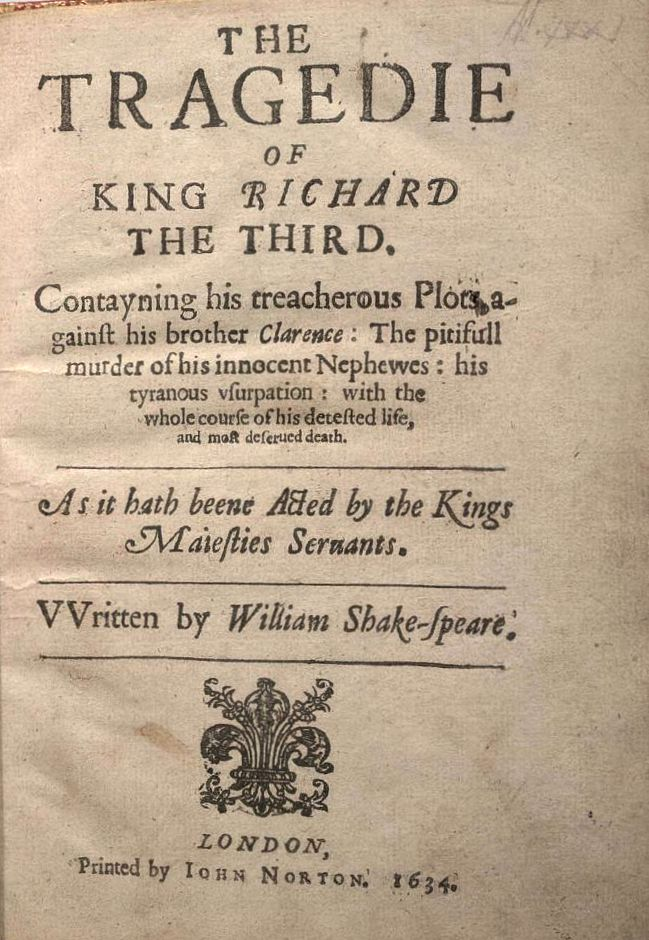
Q8 1634

=== Henry VI, Part 3 ===
Octavo 1 1595

The true Tragedie of Richard | Duke of Yorke, and the death of | good King Henrie the Sixt, | with the whole contention betweene | the two Houses Lancaster | and Yorke, as it was sundrie times | acted by the Right Honoura- | ble the Earle of Pem- | brooke his seruants. | Printed at London by P. S. for Thomas Milling- | ton, and are to be sold at his shoppe vnder | Saint Peters Church in | Cornwal. 1595.

Q2 1600

THE | True Tragedie of | Richarde Duke of | Yorke, and the death of good | King Henrie the sixt: | VVith the whole contention betweene the two | Houses, Lancaster and Yorke; as it was | sundry times acted by the Right | Honourable the Earle | of Pembrooke his | seruantes. | Printed at Londou by W. W. for Thomas Millington, | and are to be sold at his shoppe vnder Saint | Peters Church in Cornewall. | 1600.

Q3 1619 (not dated, printed with Henry VI, Part 2 as part of Thomas Pavier's False Folio)

THE Whole Contention | betvveene the two Famous | Houses, LANCASTER and | YORKE. | With the Tragicall ends of the good Duke | Humfrey, Richard Duke of Yorke, | and King Henrie the | sixt. | Diuided into two Parts: And newly corrected and | enlarged. Written by William Shake- | speare, Gent. | Printed at LONDON, for T. P.

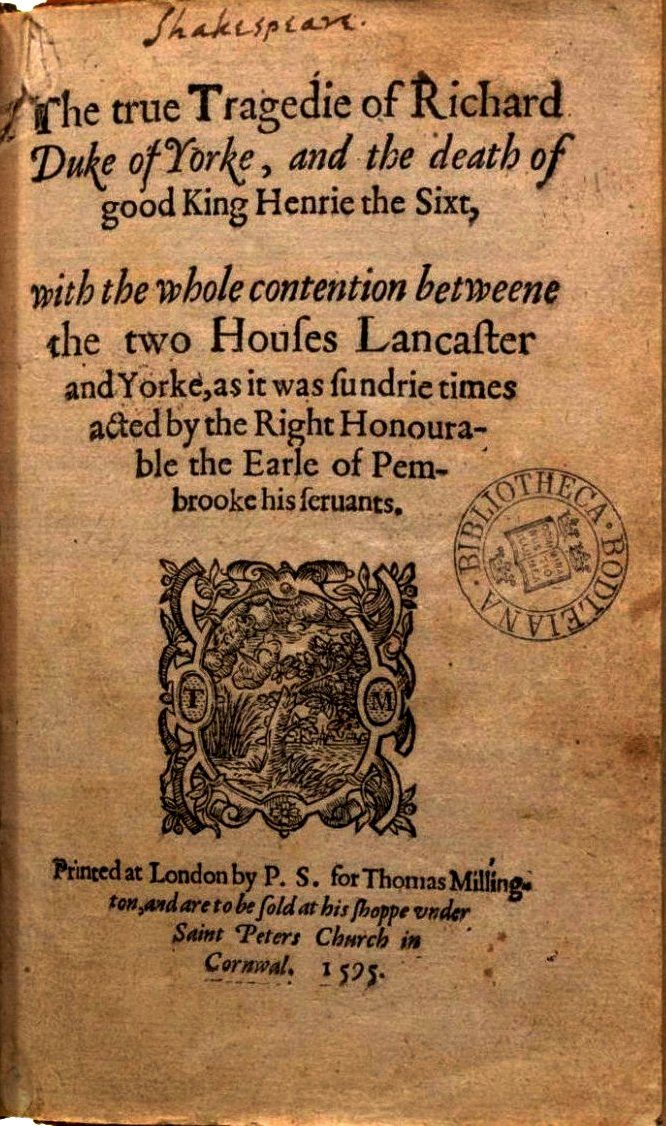
O1 1595

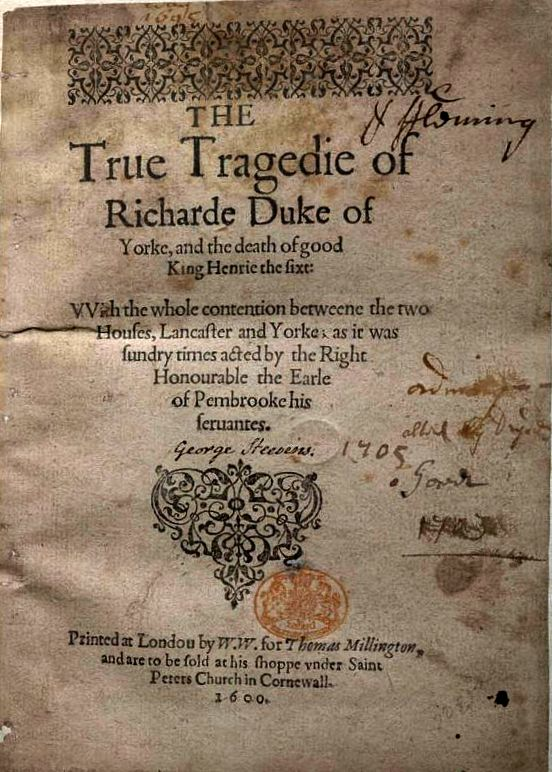
Q2 1600

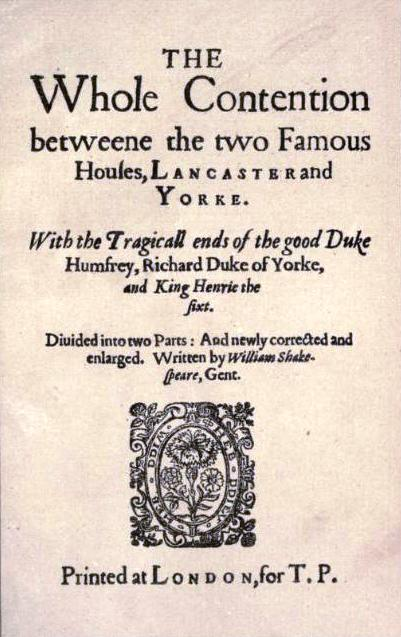
Q3 1619.

=== Romeo and Juliet ===
Q1 1597

AN | EXCELLENT | conceited Tragedie | OF | Romeo and Iuliet. | As it hath been often (with great applause) | plaid publiquely, by the right Ho- | nourable the L. of Hunsdon | his Seruants. | LONDON, | Printed by Iohn Danter. | 1597 (78 pp.)

Q2 1599

THE | MOST EX= | cellent and lamentable | Tragedie, of Romeo | and Iuliet. | Newly corrected, augmented, and | amended: | As it hath bene sundry times publiquely acted, by the | right Honourable the Lord Chamberlaine | his Seruants. | LONDON | Printed by Thomas Creede, for Cuthbert Burby, and are to | be sold at his shop neare the Exchange. | 1599. (92 pp.)

Q3 1609

THE | MOST EX- | CELLENT AND | Lamentable Tragedie, of | Romeo and Juliet. | As it hath beene sundrie times publiquely Acted, | by the KINGS Maiesties Seruants | at the Globe. | Newly corrected, augmented, and amended : | LONDON | Printed for IOHN SMETHVVICK, and are to be sold | at his Shop in Saint Dunstanes Church-yard, | in Fleetestreete vnder the Dyall, | 1609. (92 pp.)

Q4 a 1622 (not dated)

THE MOST | EXCELLENT | And Lamentable Tragedie, | of ROMEO and | IVLIET. | As it hath beene sundrie times publikely Acted, | by the KINGS Maiesties seruants | at the GLOBE. | Newly corrected, augmented, and amended. | LONDON, | Printed for Iohn Smethwicke, and are to bee sold at his Shop in | Saint Dunstanes Church-yard, in Fleetestreete | vnder the Dyall. (88 pp.)

Q4 b 1622 (not dated)

THE MOST | EXCELLENT | And Lamentable Tragedie, | of ROMEO and | IVLIET. | As it hath beene sundrie times publikely Acted, | by the KINGS Maiesties seruants | at the GLOBE. | Written by W. Shake-speare. | Newly corrected, augmented, and amended. | LONDON, | Printed for Iohn Smethwicke, and are to bee sold at his Shop in | Saint Dunstanes Church-yard, in Fleetestreete | vnder the Dyall. (88 pp.)

Q5 1637

THE MOST | EXCELLENT | And Lamentable Tragedie | of ROMEO and | JULIET. | As it hath been sundry times publikely Acted | by the KINGS Maiesties Seruants | at the GLOBE. | Written by W. Shake-speare. | Newly corrected, augmented, and amended. | LONDON, | Printed by R. Young for John Smethwicke, and are to bee sold at | his Shop in St. Dunstanes Church-yard, in Fleetstreet, | under the Dyall. 1637. (88 pp.)

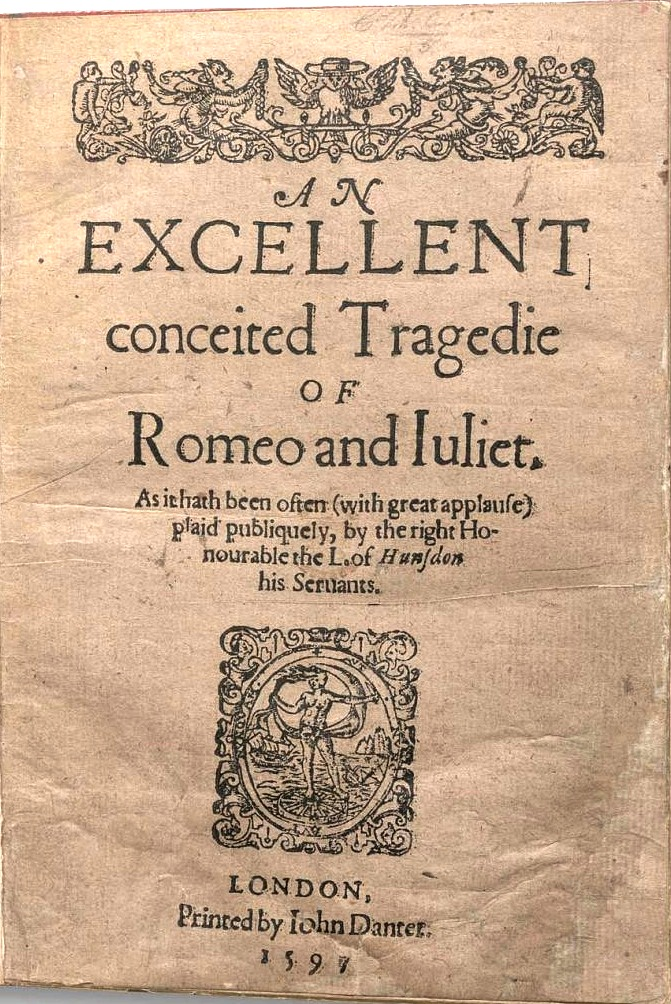
Q1 1597

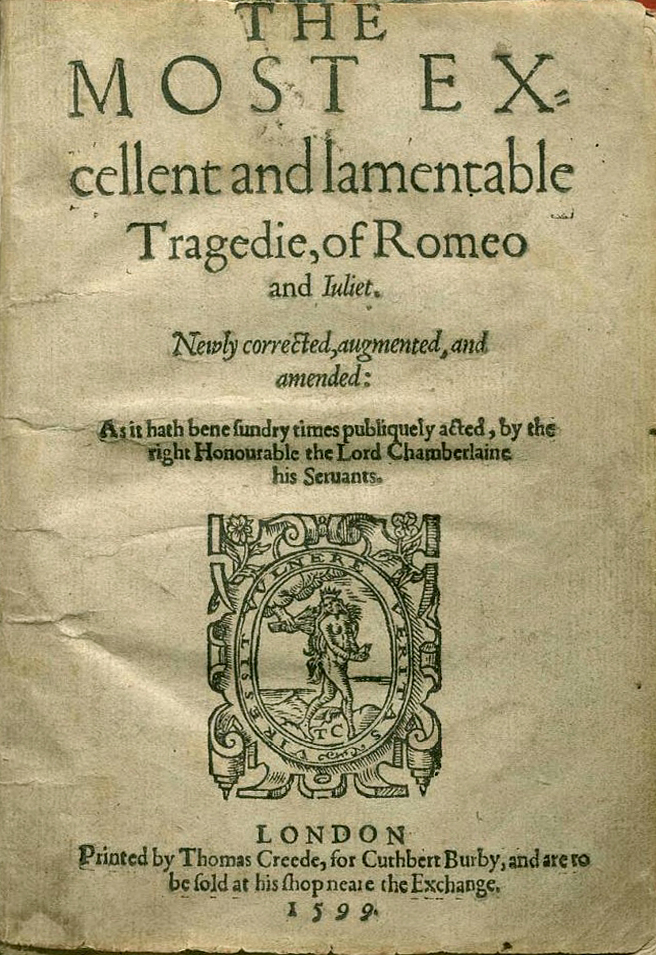
Q2 1599

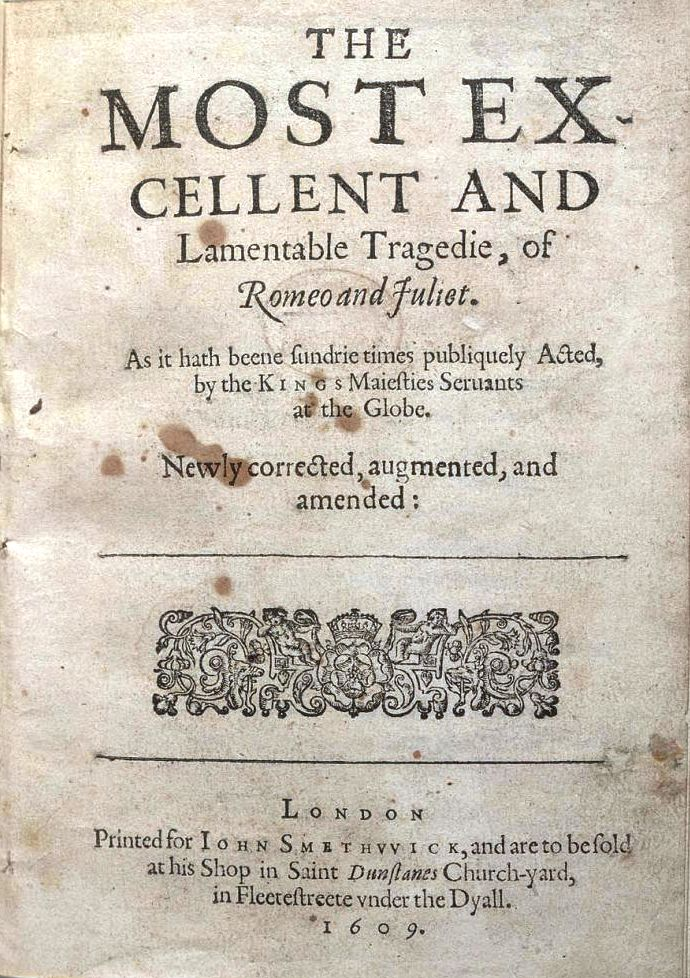
Q3 1609

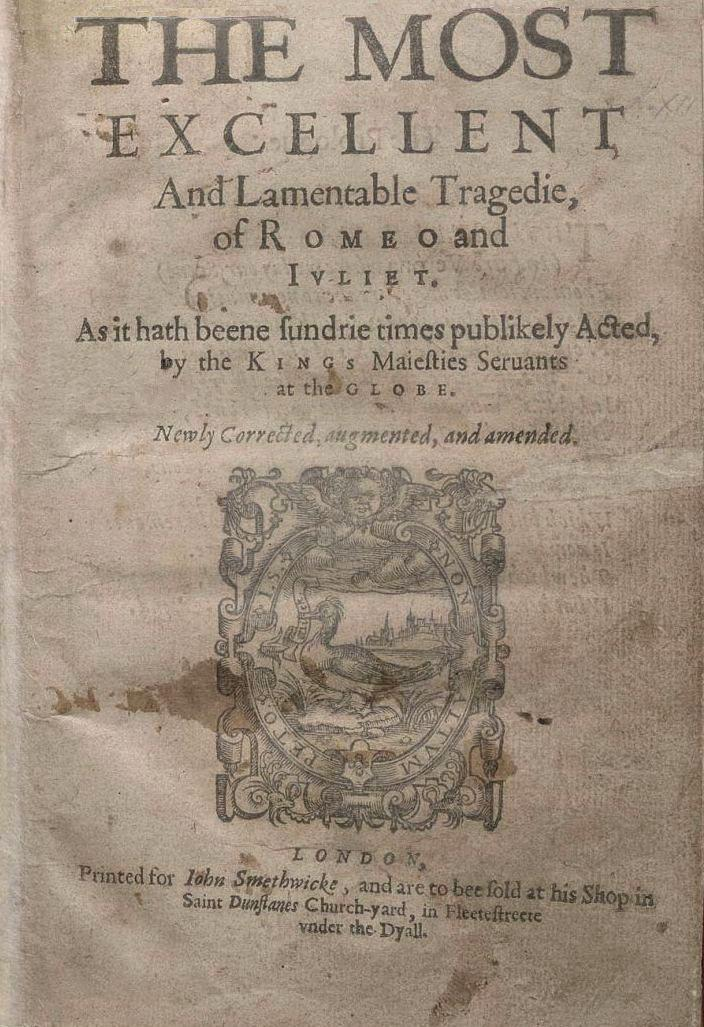
Q4 a 1622

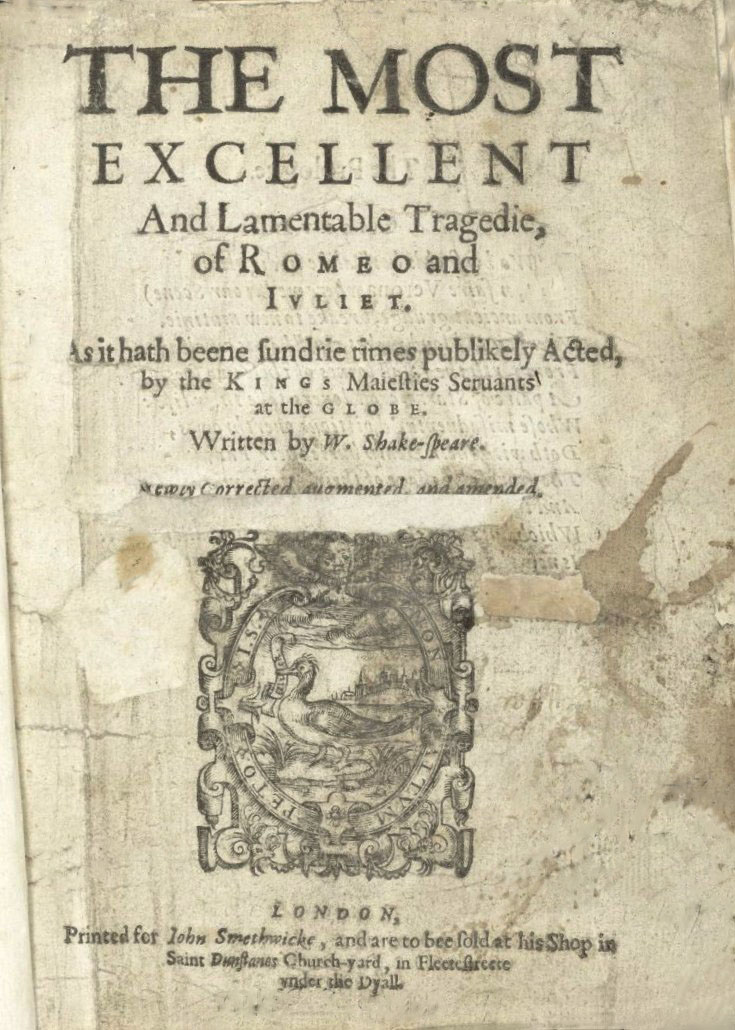
Q4 b 1622

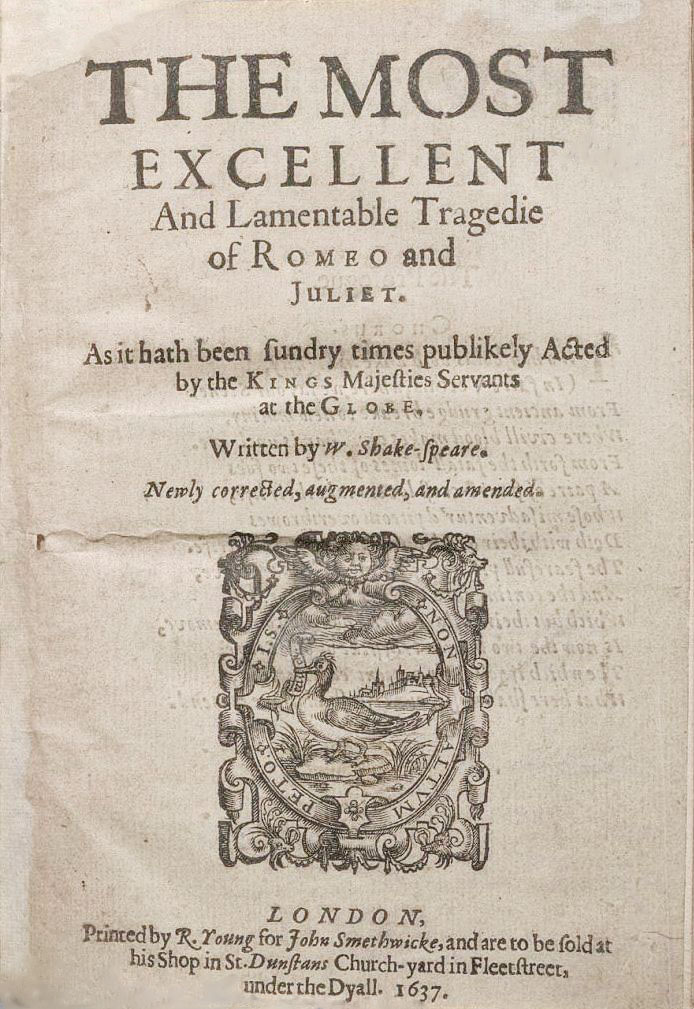
Q5 1637

=== Richard II ===
Q1 1597

THE | Tragedie of King Ri- | chard the se- | cond. | As it hath beene publikely acted | by the right Honourable the | Lorde Chamberlaine his Ser- | uants. | LONDON | Printed by Valentine Simmes for Androw Wise, and | are to be sold at his shop in Paules church yard at | the signe of the Angel. | 1597.

Q2 1598

THE | Tragedie of King Ri- | chard the second. | As it hath beene publikely acted by the right Ho- | nourable the Lorde Chamberlaine his | seruants. | By William Shake-speare. | LONDON | Printed by Valentine Simmes for Andrew Wise, and | are to be sold at his shop in Paules churchyard at | the signe of the Angel. 1598.

Q3 1598

THE | Tragedie of King Ri- | chard the second. | As it hath beene publikely acted by the right Ho- | nourable the Lorde Chamberlaine his | seruants. | By William Shake-speare. | LONDON | Printed by Valentine Simmes, for Andrew Wise, and | are to be sold at his shop in Paules churchyard, at | the signe of the Angel. 1598

Q4 a 1608

THE | Tragedie of King | Richard the second. | As it hath been publikely acted by the Right | Honourable the Lorde Chamberlaine | his seruantes. | By William Shake-speare. LONDON, | Printed by W. W. for Mathew Law, and are to be | sold at his shop in Paules Church-yard, at | the signe of the Foxe. | 1608.

Q4 b 1608

THE | Tragedie of King | Richard the second: | With new additions of the Parlia- | ment Sceane, | and the deposing | of King Richard. | As it hath been lately acted by the Kinges | Maiesties seruantes, at the Globe. | By William Shake-speare. | AT LONDON, | Printed by W. W. for Mathew Law, and are to | be sold at his shop in Paules Church-yard, | at the signe of the Foxe. | 1608.

Q5 1615

THE | Tragedie of King | Richard the Se- | cond: | With new additions of the Parliament Sceane, | and the deposing of King | Richard. | As it hath been lately acted by the Kinges | Maiesties seruants, at the Globe. | By WILLIAM SHAKE-SPEARE. | At LONDON, | Printed for Mathew Law, and are to be sold | at his shop in Paules Church-yard, | at the | signe of the Foxe. | 1615.

Q6 1634

THE | LIFE AND | DEATH OF KING | RICHARD THE | SECOND. | With new Additions of the | Parliament Scene, and the | Deposing of King Richard. | As it hath beene acted by the Kings Majesties | Servants, at the Globe. | By William Shakespeare. | LONDON, | Printed by IOHN NORTON. | 1634.

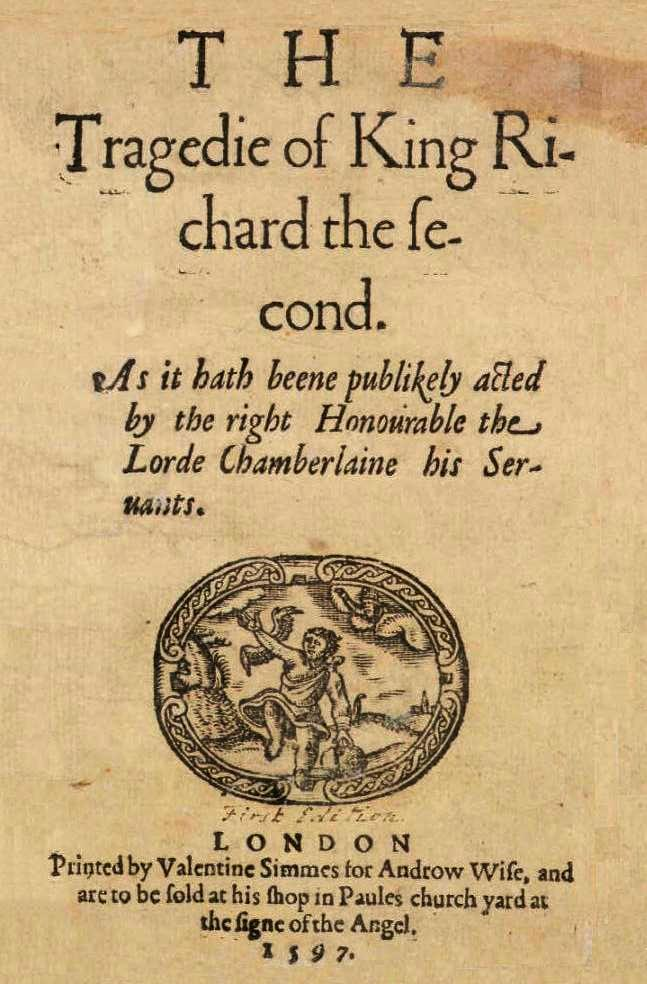
Q1 1597

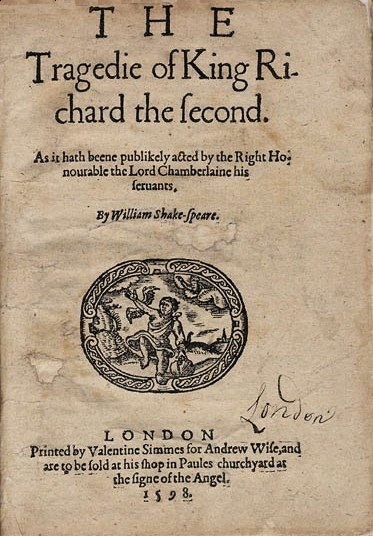
Q2 1598

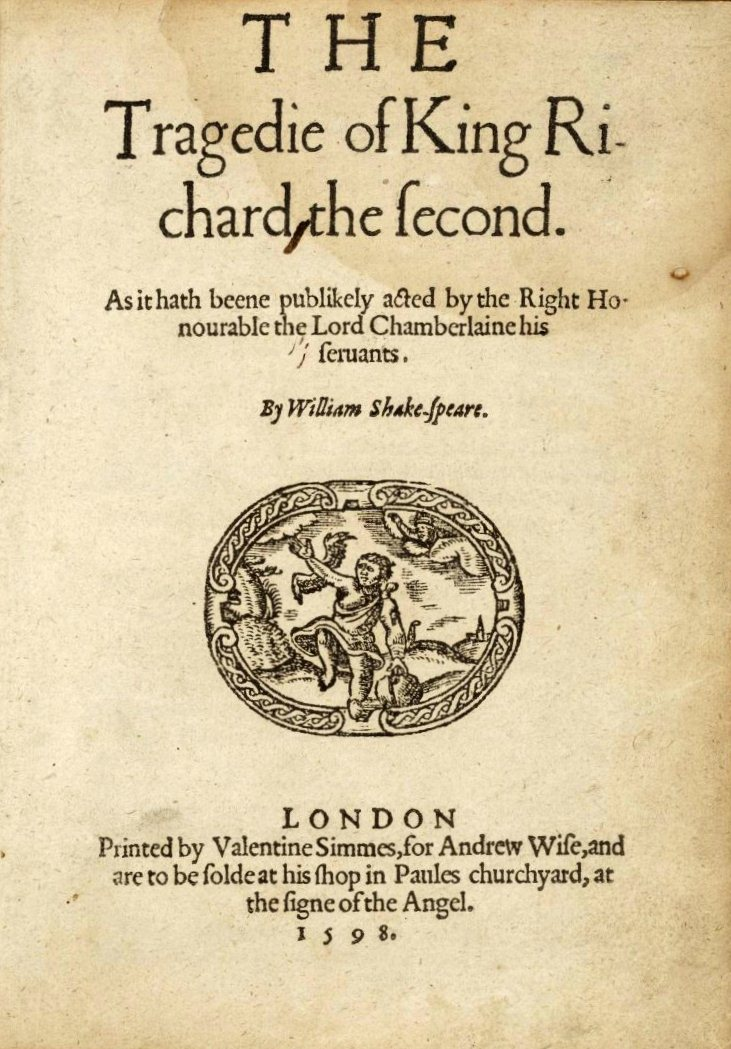
Q3 1598

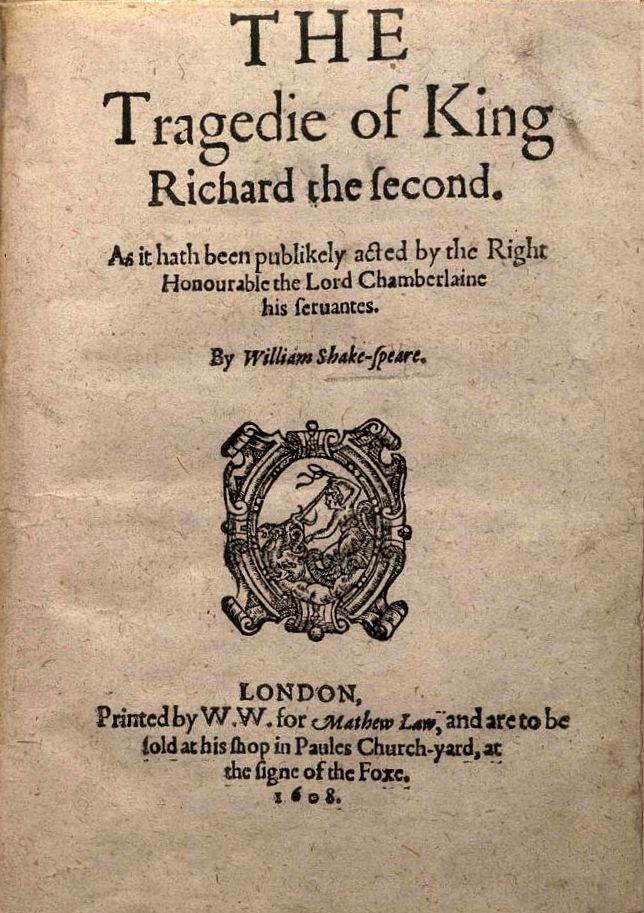
Q4 a 1608

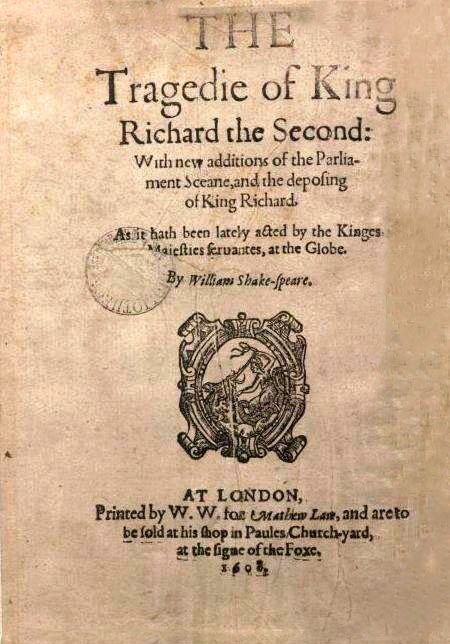
Q4 b 1608

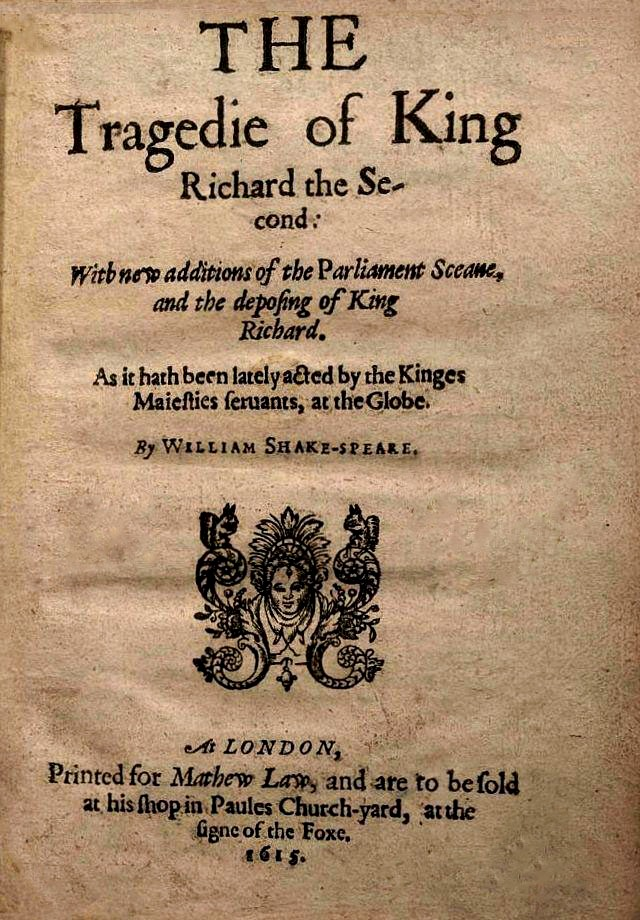
Q5 1615

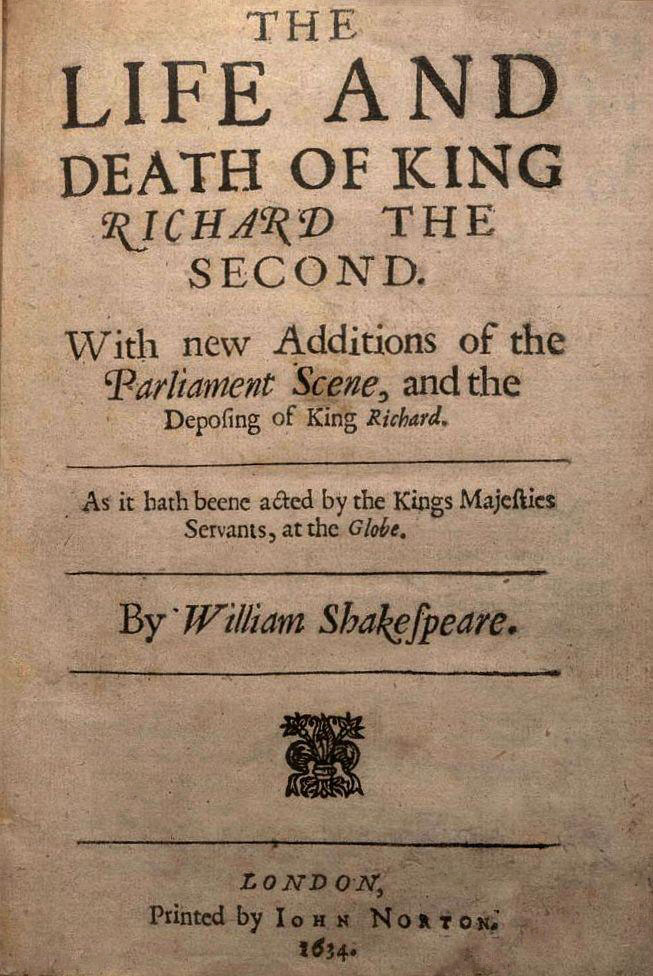
Q6 1634

=== Henry IV, Part 1 ===
Quarto 0 1598

This version thought to be earlier than Q1 is known only from a single fragment in the Folger Shakespeare Library, comprising four leaves of quire C that was found in a book binding. The running headline uses the word "hystorie" instead of "historie" and line spoken by Poins in 2.2, "How the rogue roared" is given as "How the fat rogue roared".

Q1 1598

THE | HISTORY OF | HENRIE THE | FOVRTH; | With the battell at Shrewsburie, | betweene the King and Lord | Henry Percy, surnamed | Henrie Hotspur of | the North. | With the humorous conceits of Sir | Iohn Falstalffe. | AT LONDON, | Printed by P. S. for Andrew Wise, dwelling | in Paules Churchyard, at the signe of | the Angell, 1598.

Q2 1599

THE | HISTORY OF | HENRIE THE | FOVRTH; | With the battell at Shrewsburie, | betweene the King and Lord Henry | Percy, surnamed | Henrie Hot- | spur of | the North. | With the humorous conceits of Sir | Iohn Falstalffe. | Newly corrected by W. Shake-speare. | AT LONDON, | Printed by S. S. for Andrew VVise, dwelling | in Paules Churchyard, at the signe of | the Angell. 1599.

Q3 1604

THE | HISTORY OF | Henrie the fourth, | VVith the battell at Shrewsburie, | betweene the King, and Lord | Henry Percy, surnamed Henry Hot- | spur of the North. | With the humorous conceits of Sir | Iohn Falstalffe. | Newly corrected by W. Shake-speare. | LONDON | Printed by Valentine Simmes, for Mathew Law, and | are to be solde at his shop in Paules Churchyard, | at the signe of the Fox. | 1604.

Q4 1608

THE | HISTORY OF | Henry the fourth, | VVith the battell at Shrewsburie, | betweene the King, and Lord | Henry Percy, surnamed Henry | Hotspur of the North. | With the humorous conceites of Sir | Iohn Falstalffe. | Newly corrected by W. Shake-speare. | LONDON | Printed for Mathew Law, and are to be sold at | his shop in Paules Church-yard, neere vnto S. | Augustines gate, at the signe of | the Foxe, 1608.

Q5 1613

THE | HISTORY OF | Henrie the fourth, | With the Battell at Shrewseburie, betweene | the King, and Lord Henrie Percy, sur- | named Henrie Hotspur of the North. | VVith the humorous conceites of Sir | Iohn Falstaffe. | Newly corrected by W. Shake-speare. | LONDON, | Printed by W. W. for Mathew Law, and are to be sold | at his shop in Paules Church-yard, neere vnto S. | Augustines Gate, at the signe of the Foxe. | 1613.

Q6 1622

THE | HISTORIE | OF | Henry the Fourth. | With the Battell at Shrewseburie, betweene | the King, and Lord Henry Percy, surnamed | Henry Hotspur of the North. | With the humorous conceits of Sir | Iohn Falstaffe. | Newly corrected. | By William Shake-speare. | LONDON, | Printed by T. P. and are to be sold by Mathew Law, dwelling | in Pauls Church-yard, at the signe of the Foxe, neere | S. Austines gate. 1622.

Q7 1632

THE | HISTORIE | OF | Henry the Fourth: | With the battell at Shrewesbury, be- | tweene the King, and Lord Henry Percy, | surnamed Henry Hotspur of | the North. | With the humorous conceits of Sir | Iohn Falstaffe. | Newly corrected, | By William Shake-speare. | London. | Printed by Iohn Norton, and are to bee sold by | William Sheares, at his shop at the great South doore | of Saint Pauls-Church; and in Chancery-Lane, | neere Serieants-Inne. | 1632.

Q8 1639

THE | HISTORIE | OF | Henry the Fourth: | WITH THE BATTELL AT | Shrewsbury, betweene the King, | and Lord Henry Percy, surnamed | Henry Hotspur of the | North. | With the humorous conceits of Sir | IOHN FALSTAFFE. | Newly corrected, | By WILLIAM SHAKE-SPEARE. | LONDON | Printed by JOHN NORTON, and are to be sold by | HVGH PERRY, at his shop next to Ivie-bridge | in the Strand. 1639.

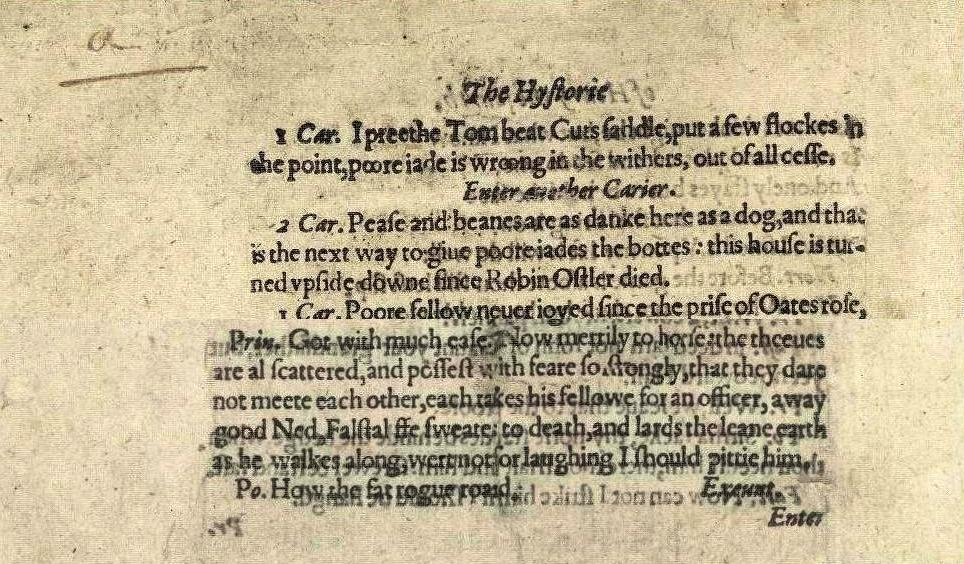
Q0 1598, composite image illustrating the two unique points of the edition.

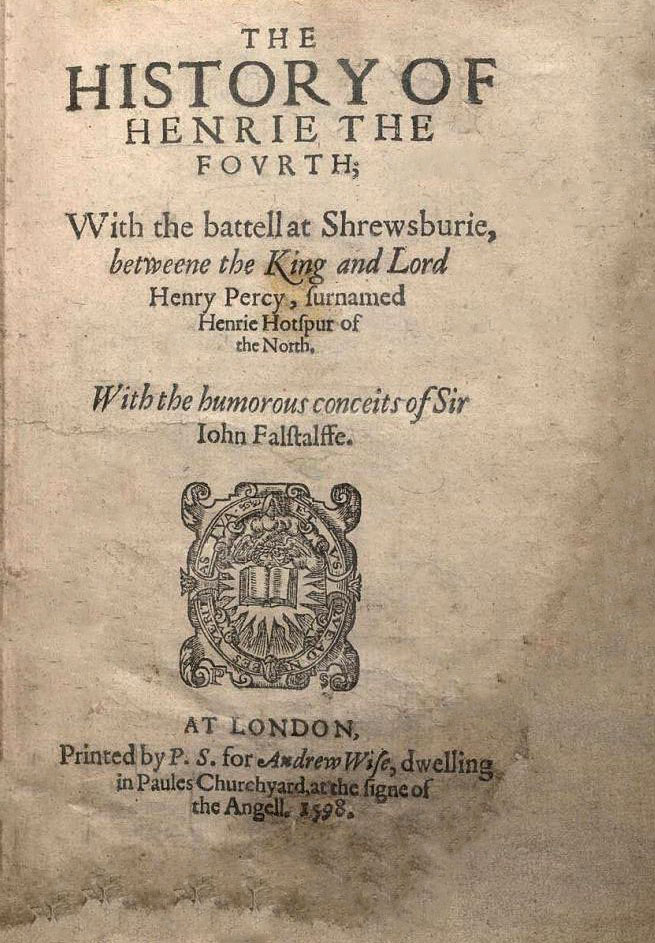
Q1 1598

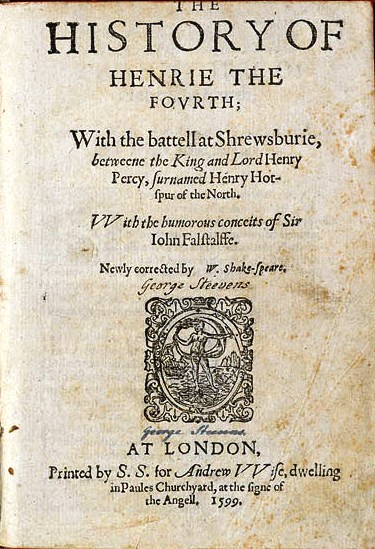
Q2 1599

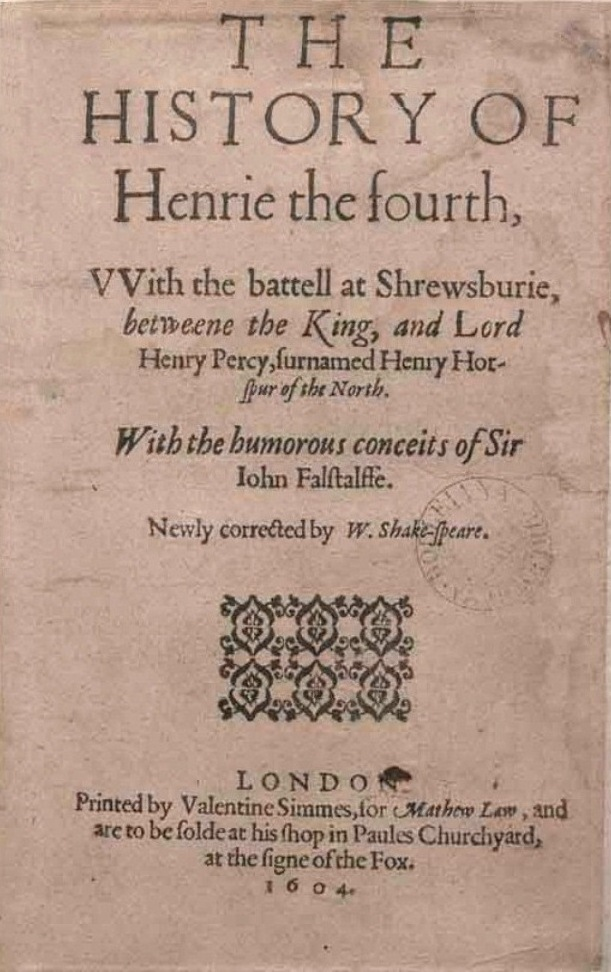
Q3 1604

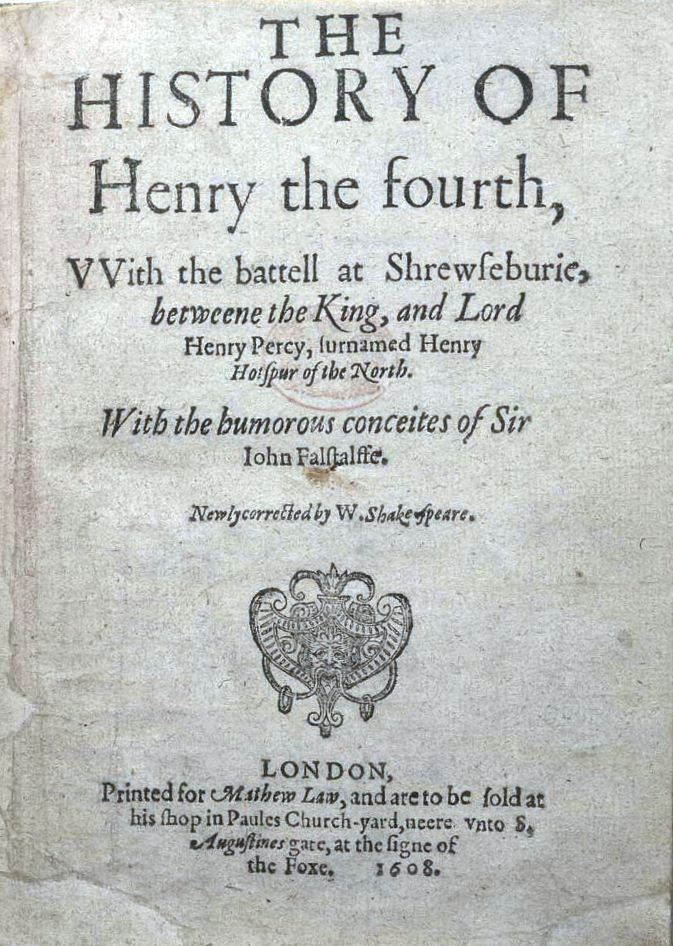
Q4 1608

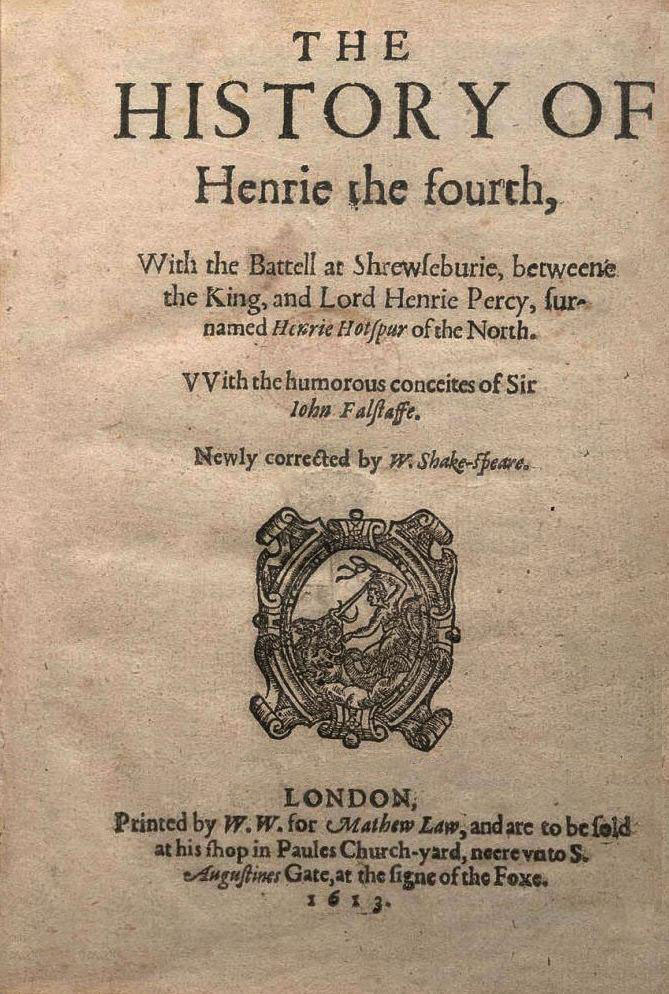
Q5 1613

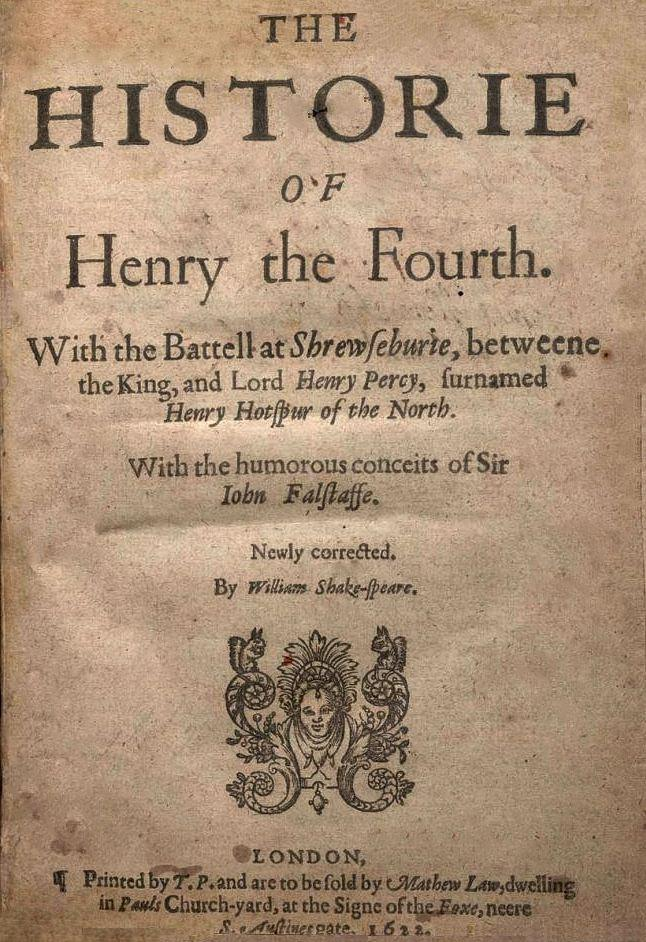
Q6 1622

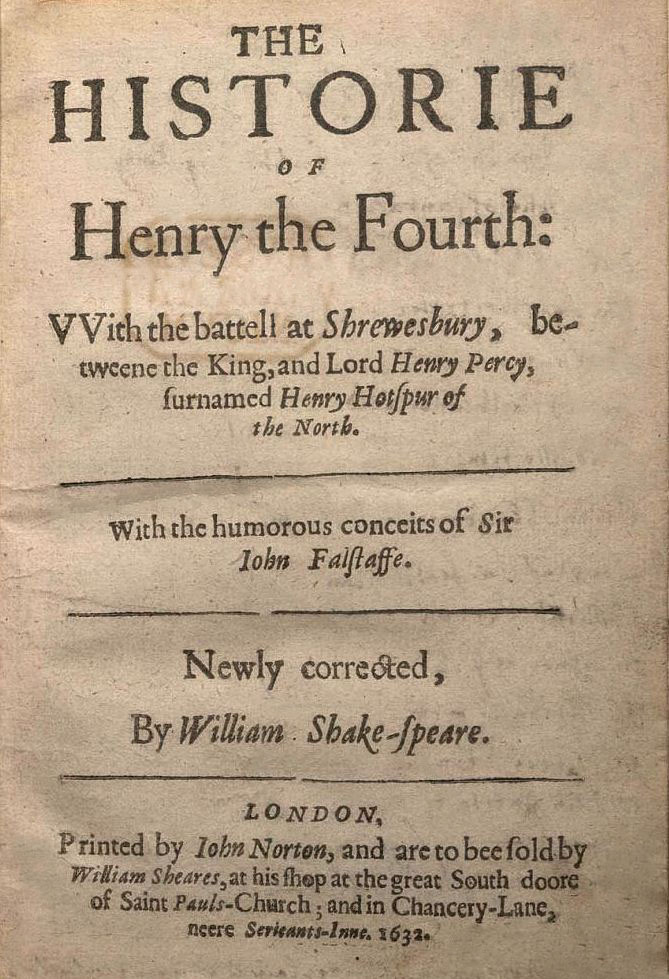
Q7 1632

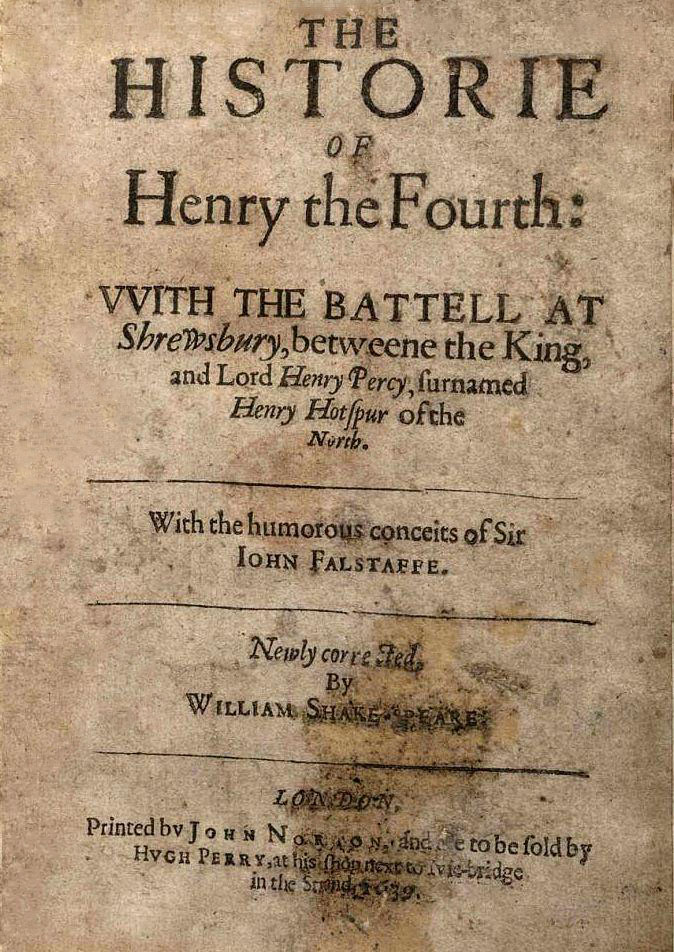
Q8 1639

=== Love's Labour's Lost ===
Q 1598

A | PLEASANT | Conceited Comedie | CALLED, | Loues labors lost. | As it vvas presented before her Highnes | this last Christmas. | Newly corrected and augmented | By W. Shakespere. | Imprinted at London: by W. W. | for Cutbert Burby, | 1598.

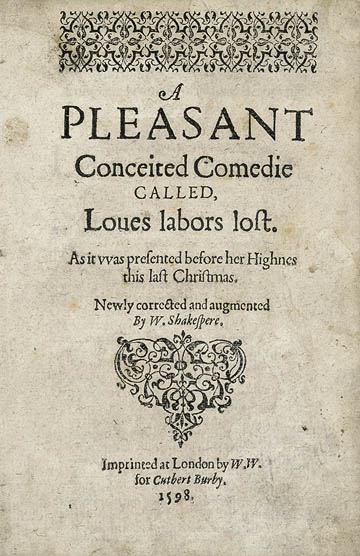
Q 1598

=== Henry IV, Part 2 ===
Quarto a (84 pages) omits the first scene of act iii and eight other passages in quire E. Quarto b (88 pages) adds the missing first scene of act iii and resets the immediately surrounding text, adding two leaves to quire E. The title pages are identical.

Q 1600

THE | Second part of Henrie | the fourth, continuing to his death, | and coronation of Henrie | the fift. | With the humours of sir Iohn Fal- | staffe, and swaggering | Pistoll. | As it hath been sundrie times publikely | acted by the right honourable, the Lord | Chamberlaine his seruants. | Written by William Shakespeare. | LONDON | Printed by V. S. for Andrew Wise, and | William Aspley. | 1600.

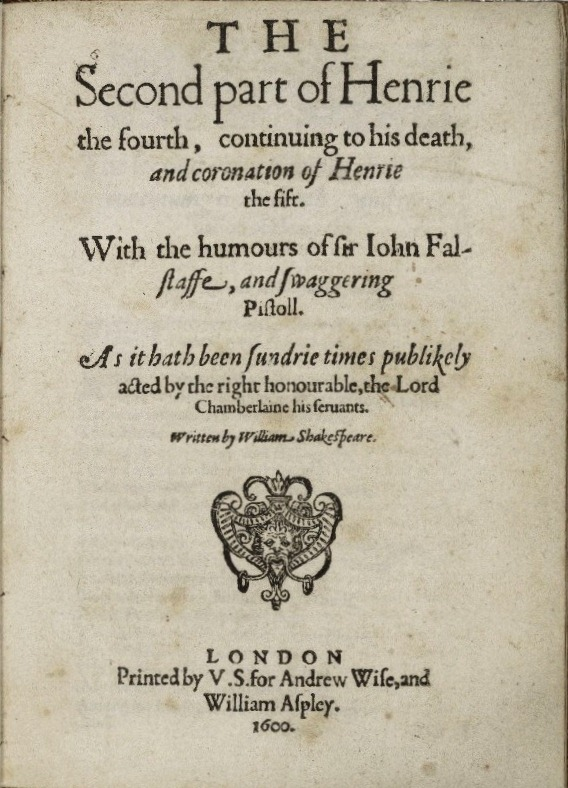
Q 1600

=== Henry V ===
Q1, 1600

THE | CRONICLE | History of Henry the fift, | With his battell fought at Agin Court in | France. Togither with Auntient | Pistoll. | As it hath bene sundry times playd by the Right honorable | the Lord Chamberlaine his seruants. | LONDON | Printed by Thomas Creede, for Tho. Milling- | ton, and Iohn Busby. And are to be | sold at his house in Carter Lane, next | the Powle head. 1600. (56 pp.)

Q2, 1602

THE | CHRONICLE | History of Henry the fift, | VVith his battell fought at Agin Court | in France. Together with Auntient | Pistoll. | As it hath bene sundry times playd by the Right honorable | the Lord Chamberlaine his seruants. | LONDON | Printed by Thomas Creede, for Thomas | Pauier, and are to be sold at his shop in Cornhill, | at the signe of the Cat and Parrets neare | the Exchange. 1602. (52 pp.)

Q3, 1619 (falsely dated 1608 as part of Thomas Pavier's False Folio)

THE | Chronicle History | of Henry the fift, with his | battell fought at Agin Court in | France. Together with an- | cient Pistoll. | As it hath bene sundry times playd by the Right Honou- | rable the Lord Chamberlaine his | Seruants. | Printed for T. P. 1608. (56 pp.)

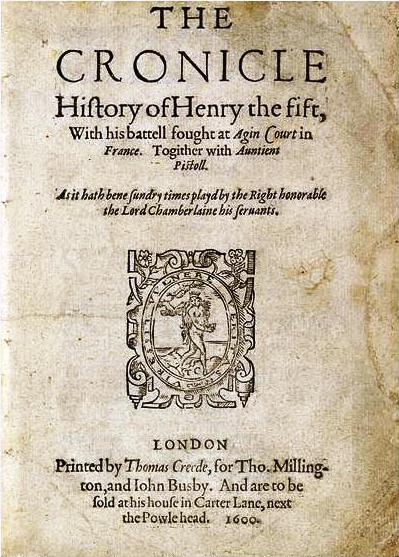
Q1 1600

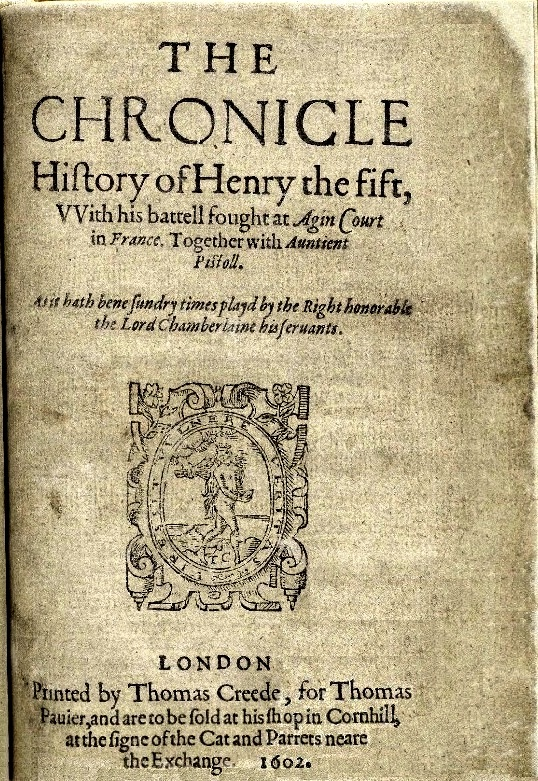
Q2 1602

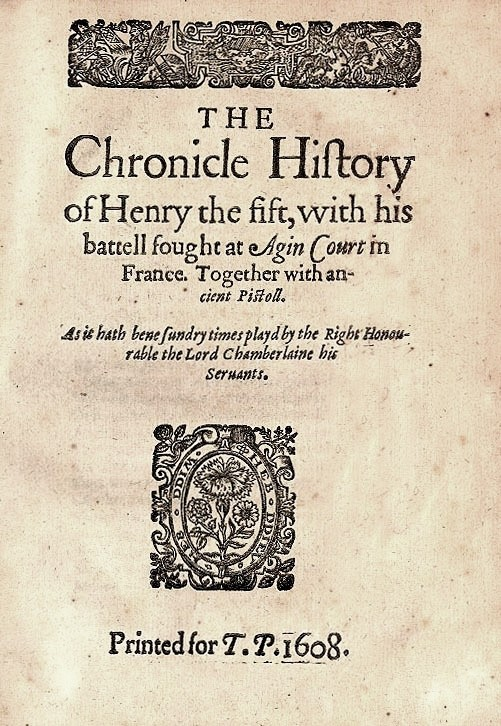
Q3 1619

=== A Midsummer Night's Dream ===
Q1 1600

A | Midsommer nights | dreame. | As it hath beene sundry times pub- | lickely acted, by the Right honoura- | ble, the Lord Chamberlaine his | seruants. | Written by William Shakespeare. | ¶ Imprinted at London, for Thomas Fisher, and are to | be soulde at his shoppe, at the Signe of the White Hart, | in Fleetestreete. 1600.

Q2 1619 (falsely dated 1600 as part of Thomas Pavier's False Folio)

A | Midsommer nights | dreame. | As it hath beene sundry times pub- | likely acted, by the Right Honoura- | ble, the Lord Chamberlaine his | seruants. | VVritten by VVilliam Shakespeare. | Printed by Iames Roberts, 1600.

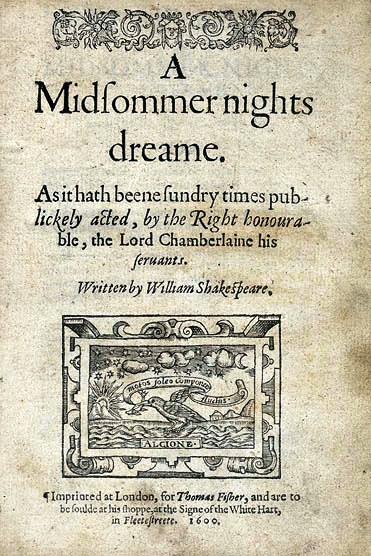
Q1 1600

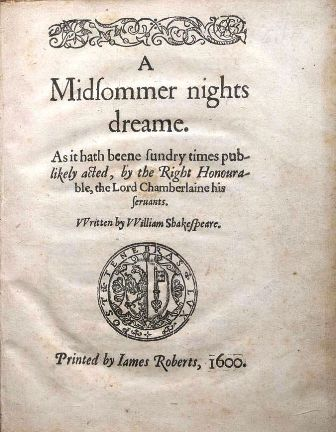
Q2 1619

=== Merchant of Venice ===
Q1 1600

The most excellent | Historie of the Merchant | of Venice. | VVith the extreame crueltie of Shylocke the Iewe | towards the sayd Merchant, in cutting a iust pound | of his flesh: and the obtayning of Portia | by the choyse of three | chests. | As it hath beene diuers times acted by the Lord | Chamberlaine his seruants. | Written by William Shakespeare. | AT LONDON, | Printed by I. R. for Thomas Heyes, | and are to be sold in Paules Church-yard, at the | signe of the Greene Dragon. | 1600.

Q2 1619 (falsely dated 1600 as part of Thomas Pavier's False Folio)

THE | EXCELLENT | History of the Mer- | chant of Venice. | With the extreme cruelty of Shylocke | the Iew towards the saide Merchant, in cut- | ting a iust pound of his flesh. And the obtaining | of Portia, by the choyse of | three Caskets. | Written by W. SHAKESPEARE. | Printed by J. Roberts, 1600

Q3 1637

The most excellent | Historie of the Merchant | of VENICE. | With the extreame crueltie of Shylocke | the Iewe towards the said Merchant, in | cutting a just pound of his flesh: and the ob- | taining of PORTIA by the choice | of three Chests. | As it hath beene divers times acted by the | Lord Chamberlaine his servants. | Written by WILLIAM SHAKESPEARE. | LONDON, | Printed by M. P. for Laurence Hayes, and are to be sold | at his Shop on Fleetbridge. 1637.

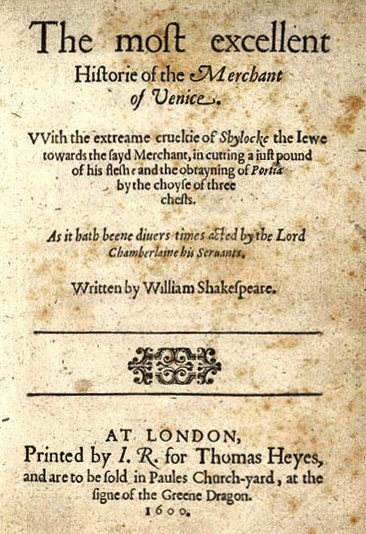
Q1 1600

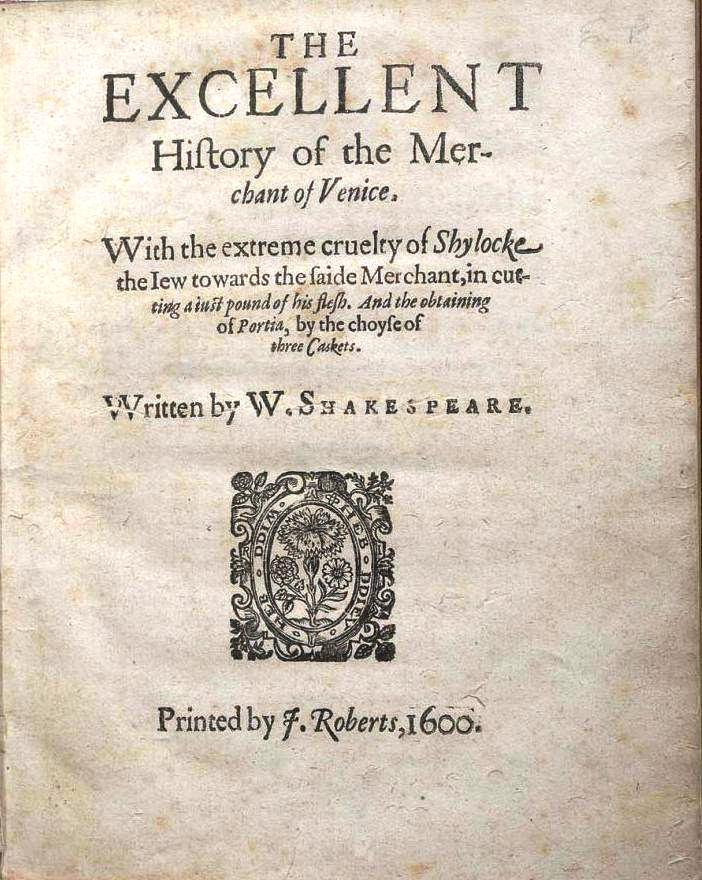
Q2 1619

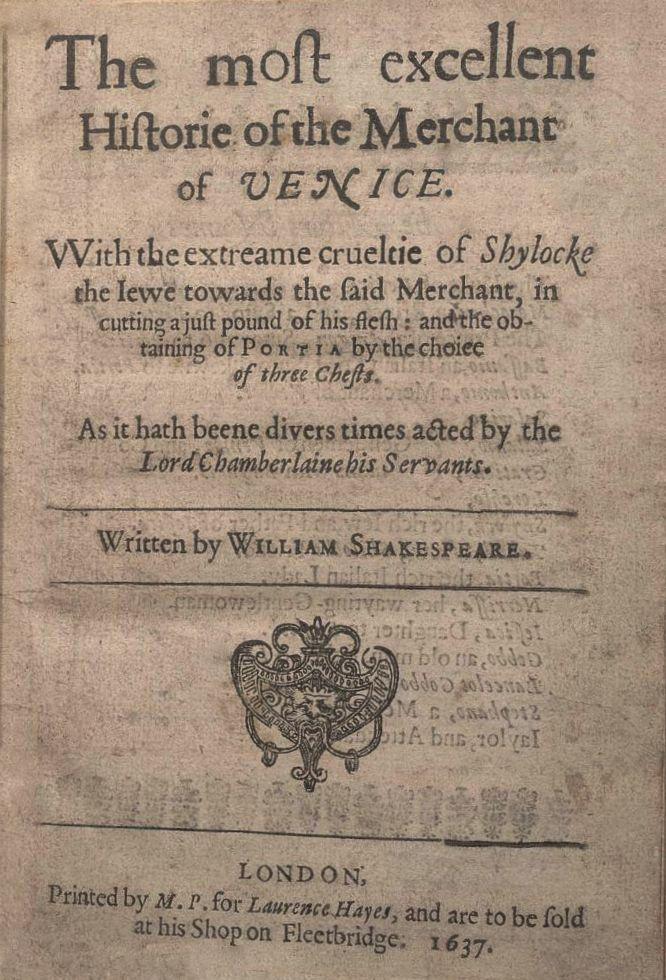
Q3 1637

=== Much Ado About Nothing ===
Q 1600

Much adoe about | Nothing. | As it hath been sundrie times publikely | acted by the right honourable, the Lord | Chamberlaine his seruants. | Written by William Shakespeare. | LONDON | Printed by V. S. for Andrew Wise, and | William Aspley. | 1600.

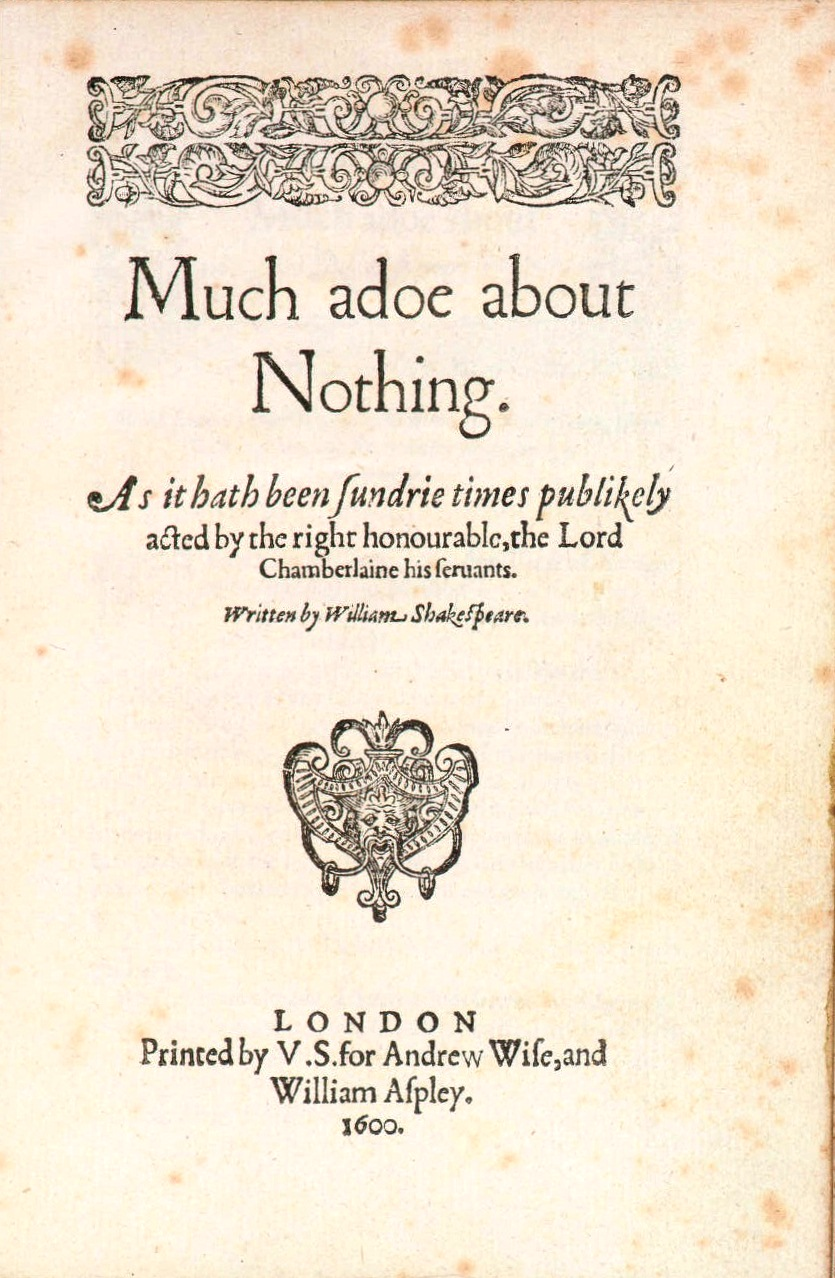
Q 1600

=== Merry Wives of Windsor ===
Q1 1602

A | Most pleasaunt and | excellent conceited Co- | medie, of Syr Iohn Falstaffe, and the | merrie Wiues of Windsor. | Entermixed with sundrie | variable and pleasing humors, of Syr Hugh | the Welch knight, Iustice Shallow, and his | wise Cousin M. Slender. | With the swaggering vaine of Auncient | Pistoll, and Corporall Nym. | By William Shakespeare. | As it hath bene diuers times Acted by the right Honorable | my Lord Chamberlaines seruants. Both before her | Maiestie, and else-where. | LONDON | Printed by T. C. for Arthur Iohnson, and are to be sold at | his shop in Powles Church-yard, at the signe of the | Flower de Leuse and the Crowne. | 1602.

Q2 1619 (publisher falsely stated as Arthur Johnson as part of Thomas Pavier's False Folio)

A | Most pleasant and ex- | cellent conceited Comedy, | of Sir Iohn Falstaffe, and the | merry VViues of VVindsor. | VVith the swaggering vaine of An- | cient Pistoll, and Corporall Nym. | Written by W. SHAKESPEARE. | Printed for Arthur Johnson, 1619.

Q3 1630

THE | MERRY VVIVES | OF WINDSOR. | With the humours of Sir Iohn Falstaffe, | As also the swaggering vaine of Ancient | Pistoll, and Corporall Nym. | Written by William Shake-Speare. | Newly corrected. | LONDON: | Printed by T. H. for R. Meighen, and are to be sold | at his Shop, next to the Middle-Temple Gate, and in | S. Dunstans Church-yard in Fleet-street, | 1630.

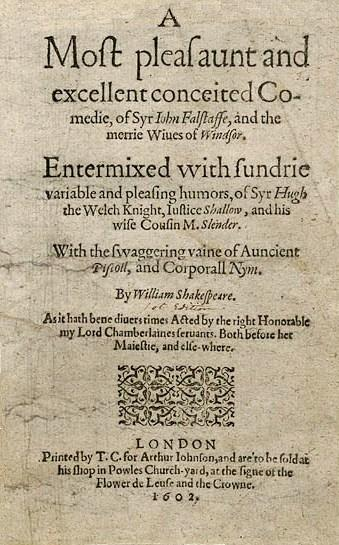
Q1 1602

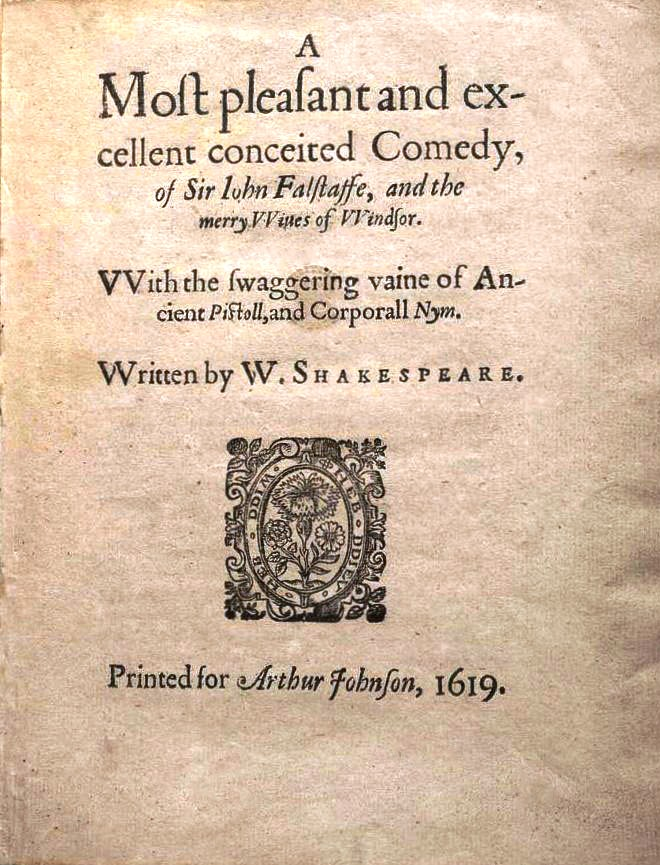
Q2 1619

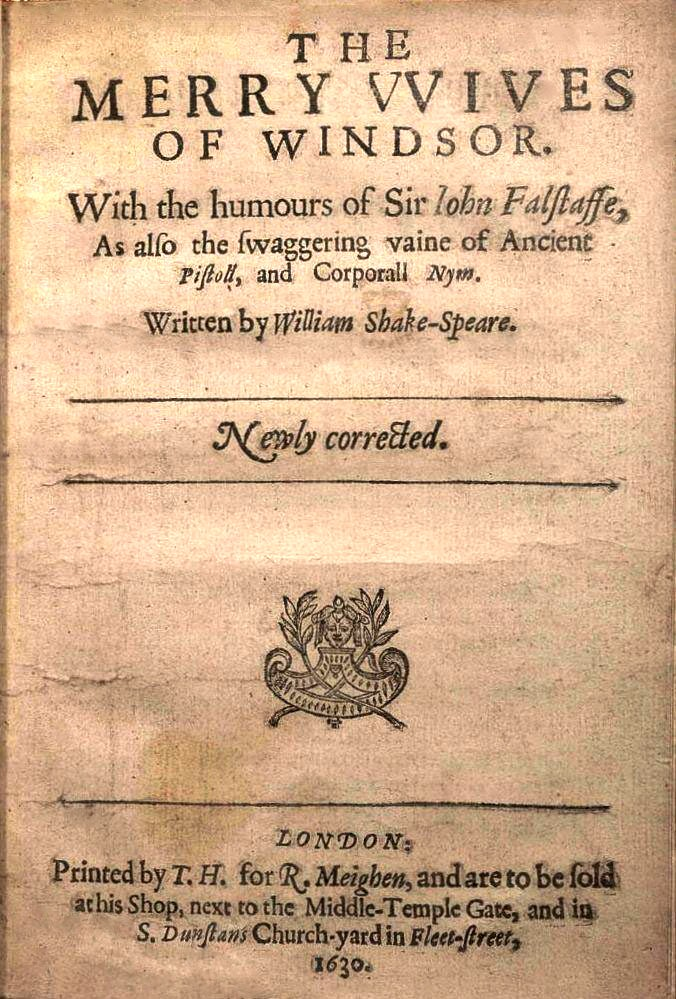
Q3 1630

=== Hamlet ===
Q1 1603

THE | Tragicall Historie of | HAMLET | Prince of Denmarke | by William Shake-speare. | As it hath beene diuerse times acted by his Highnesse ser- | uants in the Cittie of London : as also in the two V- | niuersities of Cambridge and Oxford, and else-where | At London: printed for N. L. and Iohn Trundell. | 1603. (66 pp.)

Q2 a 1604

THE | Tragicall Historie of | HAMLET, | Prince of Denmarke. | By William Shakespeare. | Newly imprinted and enlarged to almost as much | againe as it was, according to the true and perfect | Coppie. | AT LONDON, | Printed by I. R. for N. L. and are to be sold at his | shoppe vnder Saint Dunstons Church in | Fleetstreet. 1604. (102 pp.)

Q2 b 1605

THE | Tragicall Historie of | HAMLET, | Prince of Denmarke. | By William Shakespeare. | Newly imprinted and enlarged to almost as much | againe as it was, according to the true and perfect | Coppie. | AT LONDON, | Printed by I. R. for N. L. and are to be sold at his | shoppe vnder Saint Dunstons Church in | Fleetstreet. 1605. (102 pp.)

Q3 1611

THE | TRAGEDY | OF | HAMLET | Prince of Denmarke. | BY | WILLIAM SHAKESPEARE. | Newly imprinted and enlarged to almost as much | againe as it was, according to the true | and perfect Coppy. | AT LONDON, | Printed for Iohn Smethwicke, and are to be sold at his shoppe | in Saint Dunstons Church yeard in Fleetstreet. | Vnder the Diall. 1611. (104 pp.)

Q4 1622 (no date)

THE | TRAGEDY | OF | HAMLET | Prince of Denmarke. | BY | WILLIAM SHAKESPEARE. | LONDON, | Printed by W. S. for Iohn Smethwicke, and are to be sold at his | shoppe in Saint Dunstons Church-yard in Fleetstreet: | Vnder the Diall.

Q5 1637

THE | TRAGEDY | OF HAMLET | PRINCE OF | DENMARK. | Newly imprinted and inlarged, according to the true | and perfect Copy last Printed. | By WILLIAM SHAKESPEARE. | LONDON, | Printed by R. Young for John Smethwicke, and are to be sold at his | Shop in Saint Dunstans Church-yard in Fleet-stteet, | under the Diall, 1637. (104 pp.)

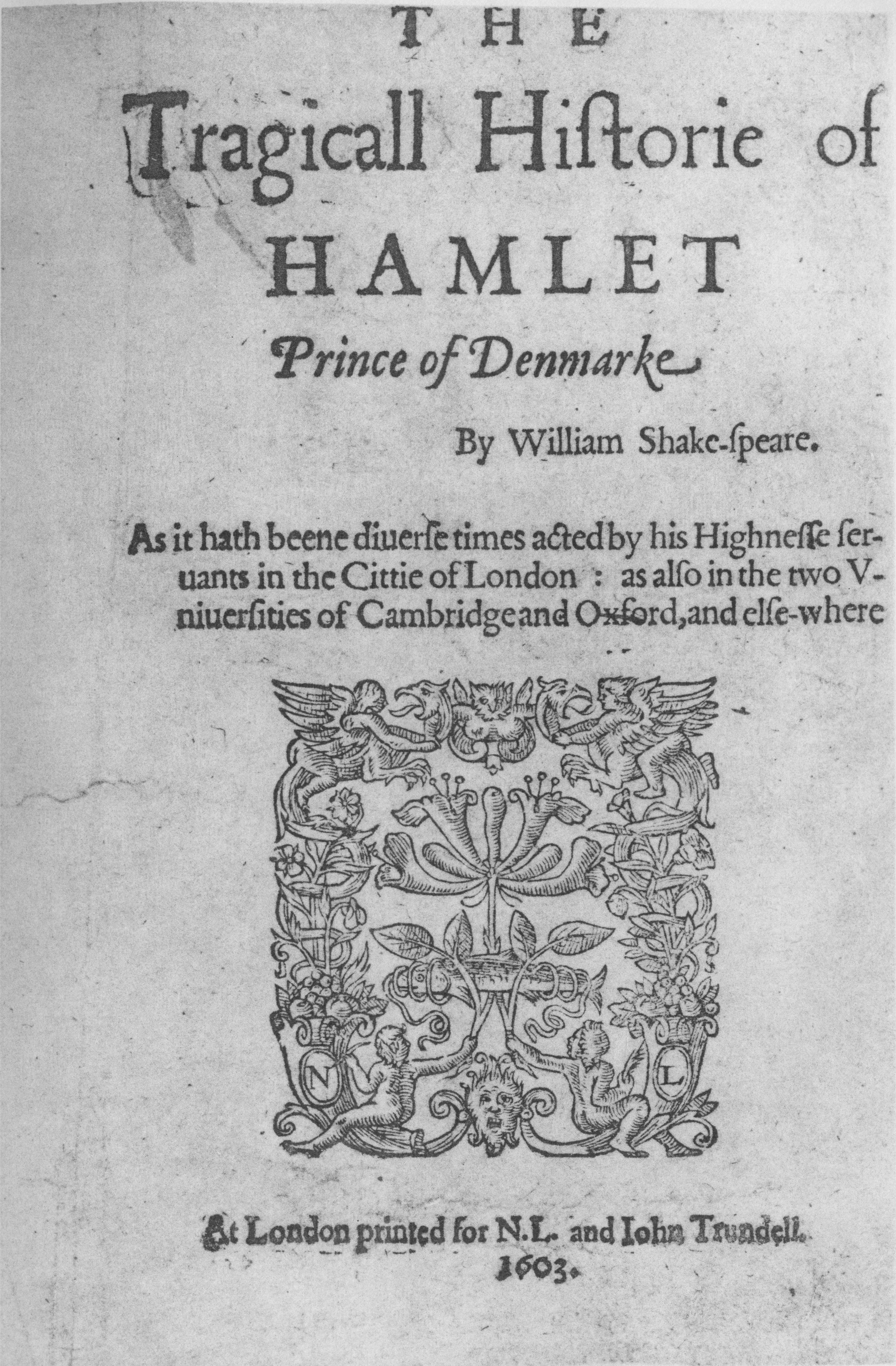
Q1 1603

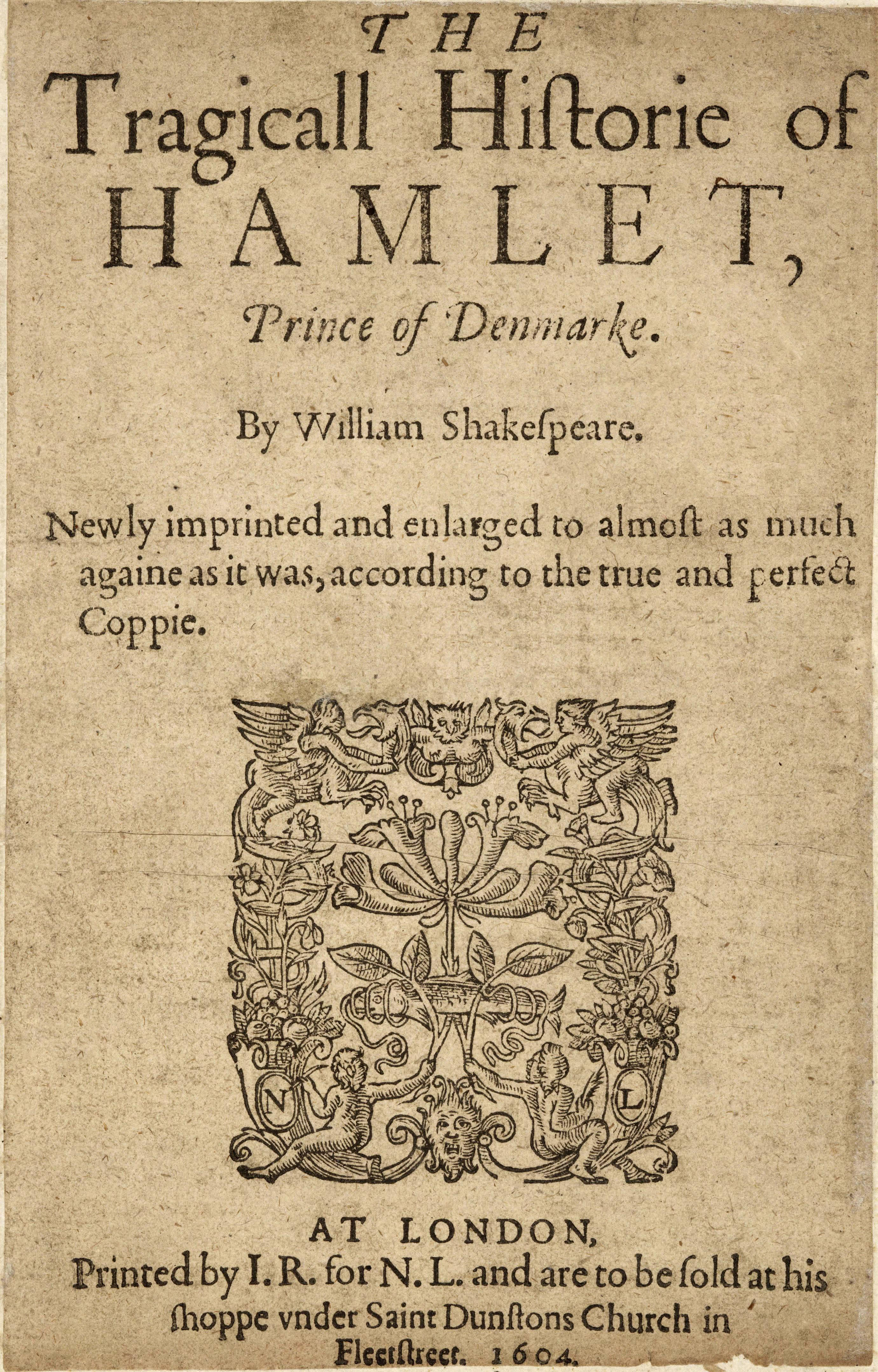
Q2a 1604

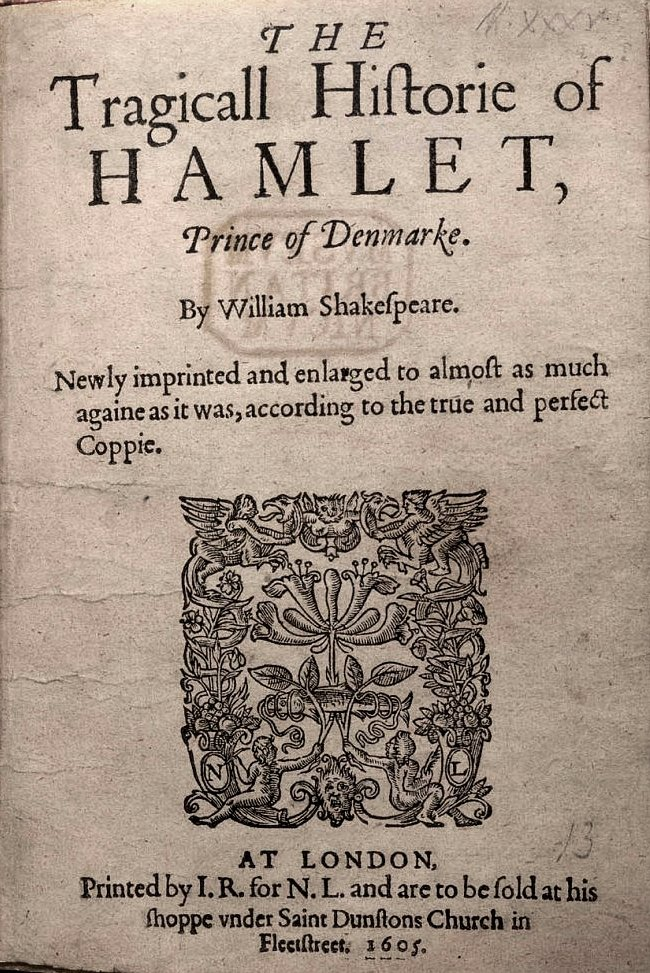
Q2b 1605

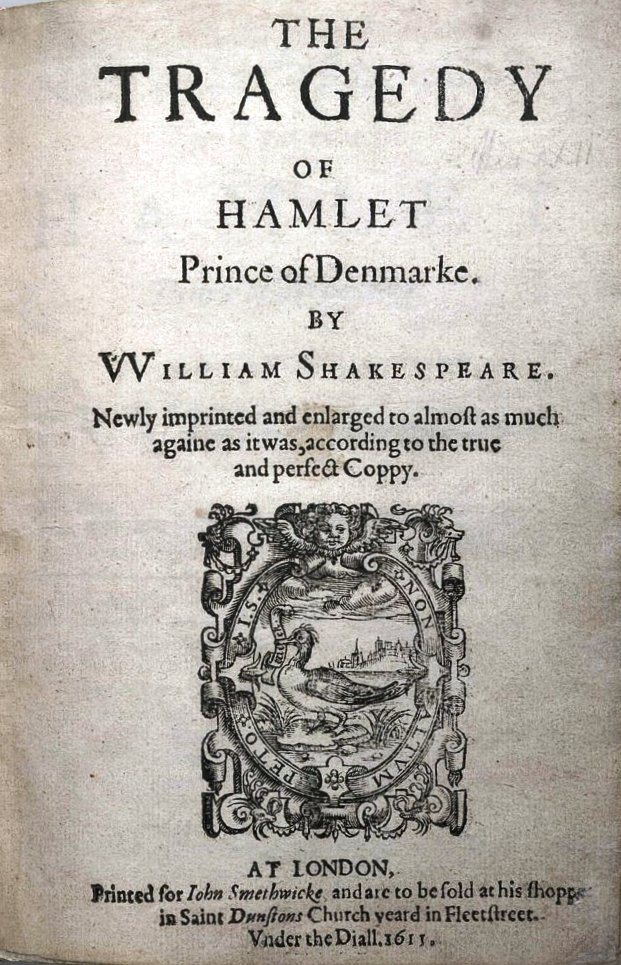
Q3 1611

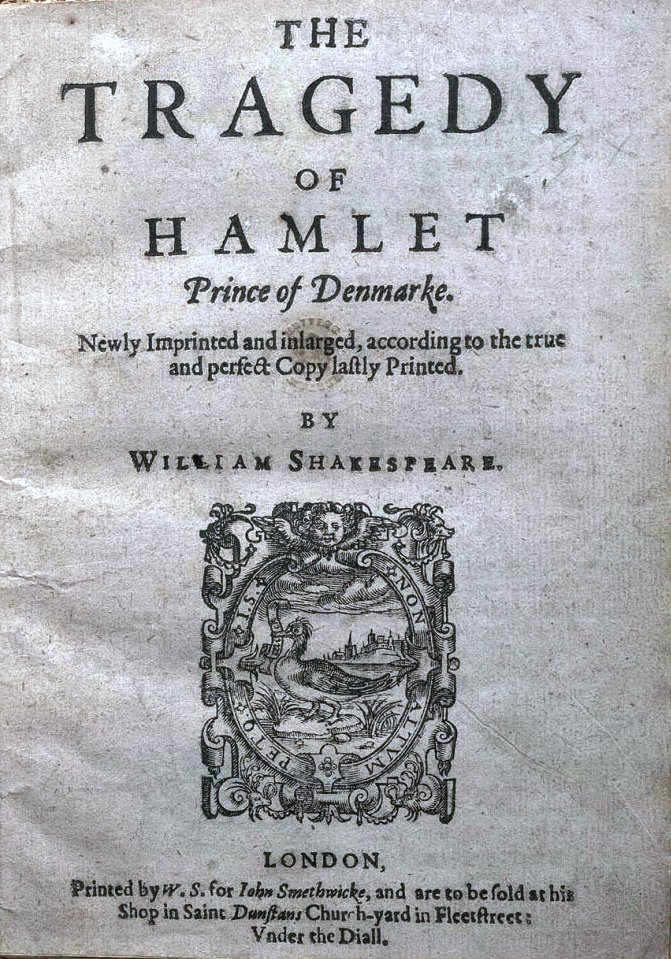
Q4 1622

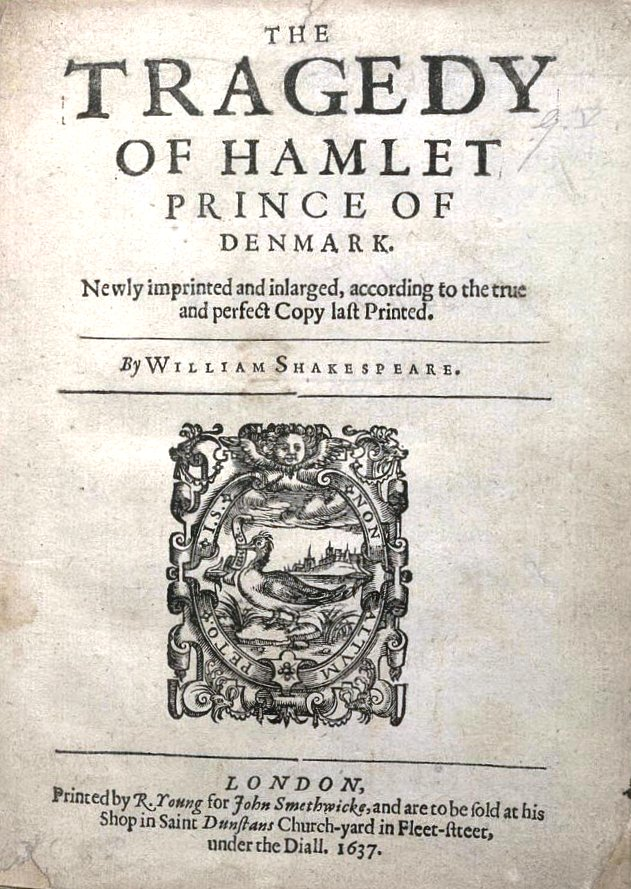
Q5 1637

=== King Lear ===
Q1 1608

M. William Shak-speare: | HIS | True Chronicle Historie of the life and | death of King LEAR and his three | Daughters. | With the vnfortunate life of Edgar, sonne | and heire to the Earle of Gloster, and his | sullen and assumed humor of | TOM of Bedlam: | As it was played before the Kings Maiestie at Whitehall vpon | S. Stephans night in Christmas Hollidayes. | By his Maiesties seruants playing vsually at the Gloabe | on the Bancke-side. | LONDON, | Printed [by Nicholas Okes] for Nathaniel Butter, and are to be sold at his shop in Pauls | Church-yard at the signe of the Pide Bull neere | St. Austins Gate 1608 (84 pp.)

Q2 1619 (falsely dated 1608 as part of Thomas Pavier's False Folio)

M. VVilliam Shake-speare, | HIS | True Chronicle History of the life | and death of King Lear, and his | three daughters. | With the vnfortunate life of EDGAR, sonne and heire to the Earle of Glocester, and | his sullen and assumed humour of TOM | of Bedlam. | As it was plaied before the Kings Maiesty at White-hall, vp- | pon S. Stephens night, in Christmas Hollidaies. | By his Maiesties Seruants, playing vsually at the | Globe on the Banck-side. | Printed for Nathaniel Butter. 1608. (88 pp.)

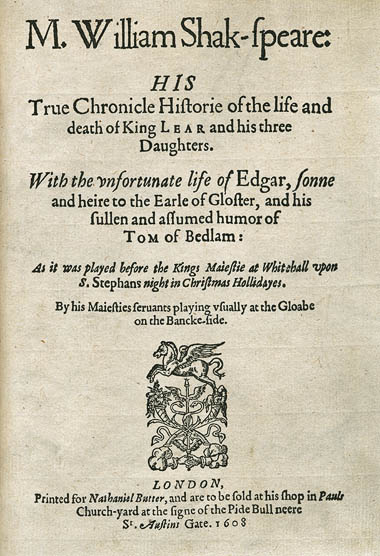
Q1 1608

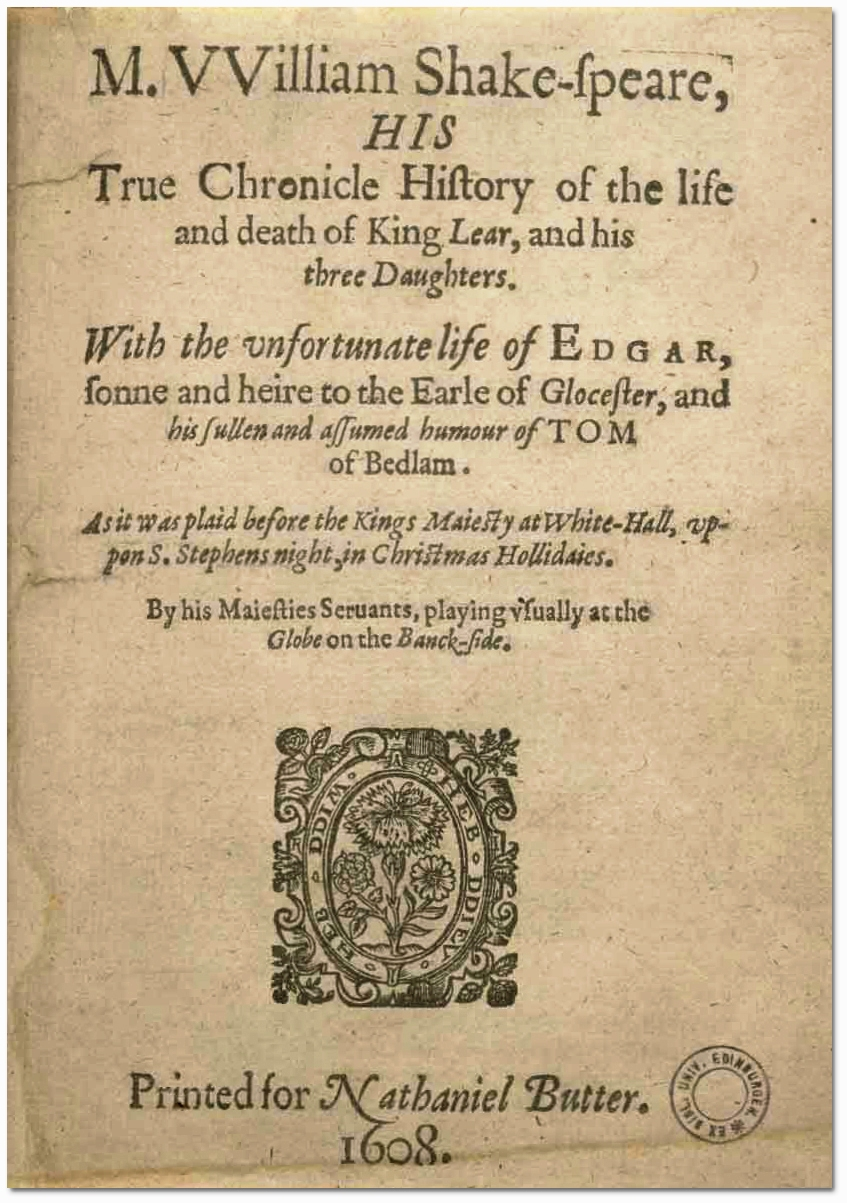
Q2 1619

=== Troilus and Cressida ===
Q a 1609

THE Historie of Troylus | and Cresseida. | As it was acted by the Kings Maiesties | seruants at the Globe. | Written by William Shakespeare. | LONDON | Imprinted by G. Eld for R. Bonian and H. Walley, and | are to be sold at the spred Eagle in Paules | Church-yeard, ouer against the | great North doore. | 1609.

Q b 1609

THE | Famous Historie of | Troylus and Cresseid. | Excellently expressing the beginning | of their loues, with the conceited wooing | of Pandarus Prince of Licia. | Written by William Shakespeare. | LONDON | Imprinted by G. Eld for R. Bonian and H. Walley, and | are to be sold at the spred Eagle in Paules | Church-yeard, ouer against the | great north doore. | 1609.

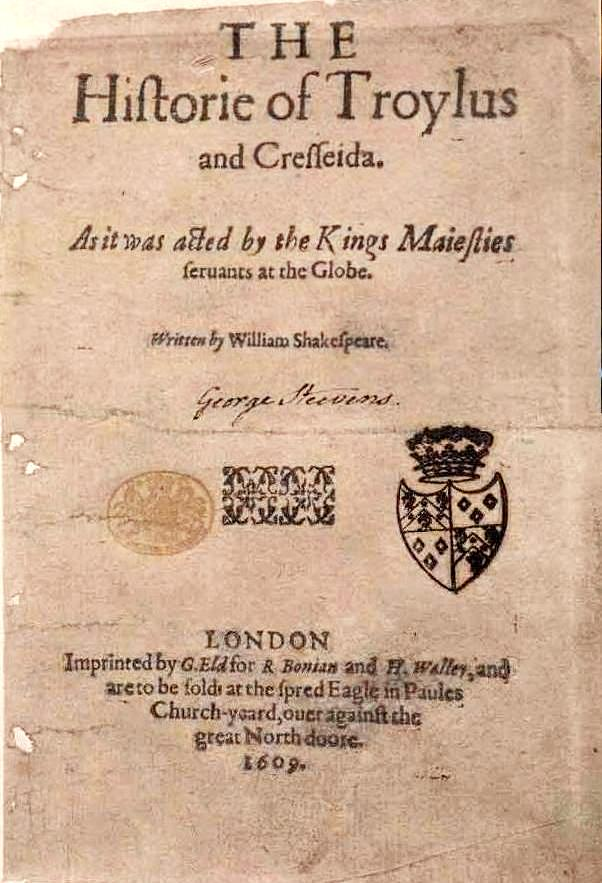
Q a 1609

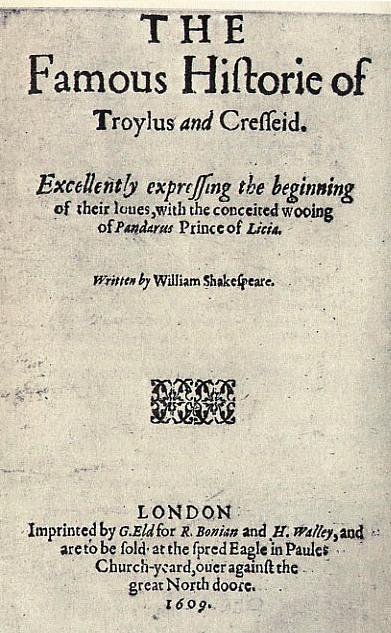
Q b 1609

=== Pericles, Prince of Tyre ===
Q1 1609

THE LATE, | And much admired Play, | Called | Pericles, Prince | of Tyre. | With the true Relation of the whole Historie, | aduentures, and fortunes of the said Prince: | As also, | The no lesse strange, and worthy accidents, | in the Birth and Life, of his Daughter | MARIANA. | As it hath been diuers and sundry times acted by | his Maiesties Seruants, at the Globe on | the Banck-side. | By William Shakespeare. | Imprinted at London for Henry Gosson, and are | to be sold at the signe of the Sunne in | Pater-noster row, &c. | 1609.

Q2 1609

THE LATE, | And much admired Play, | Called | Pericles, Prince | of Tyre. | With the true Relation of the whole Historie, | aduentures, and fortunes of the said Prince: | As also, | The no lesse strange, and worthy accidents, | in the Birth and Life, of his Daughter | MARIANA. | As it hath been diuers and sundry times acted by | his Maiesties Seruants, at the Globe on | the Banck-side. | By William Shakespeare. | Imprinted at London for Henry Gosson, and are | to be sold at the signe of the Sunne in | Pater-noster row, &c. | 1609.

Q3 1611

THE LATE, | And much admired Play, | Called | Pericles, Prince | of Tyre. | With the true Relation of the whole History, | aduentures, and fortunes of the sayd Prince: | As also, | The no lesse strange, and worthy accidents, | in the Birth and Life, of his Daughter | MARIANA. | As it hath been diuers and sundry times acted by | his Maiestyes Seruants, at the Globe on | the Banck-side. | By VVilliam Shakespeare. | Printed at London by S. S. | 1611.

Q4a 1619 (first state as part of Thomas Pavier's False Folio)

THE LATE, | And much admired play, | CALLED, | Pericles, Prince of | Tyre. | With the true relation of the whole Hi- | story, aduentures, and fortunes of | the saide Prince. | Written by W. SHAKESPEARE. | Printed for T. P. 1619.

Q4b 1619 (corrected state falsely dated 1609 as part of Thomas Pavier's False Folio)

THE LATE, | And much admired play, | CALLED, | Pericles, Prince of | Tyre. | With the true relation of the whole Hi- | story, aduentures, and fortunes of | the saide Prince. | Written by W. SHAKESPEARE. | Printed for T. P. 1609.

Q5 1630

THE LATE, | And much admired play, | CALLED | Pericles, Prince of | Tyre. | With the true relation of the whole Hi- | story, aduentures, and fortunes | of the saide Prince. | Written by WILL. SHAKESPEARE. | LONDON, | Printed by I. N. for R. B. and are to be sould | at his shop in Cheapside, at the signe of the | Bible. 1630.

Q6 1635

THE LATE, | And much admired Play, | CALLED | Pericles, Prince of | Tyre. | With the true Relation of the whole Hi- | story, adventures, and fortunes of | the said Prince. | Written by W. SHAKESPEARE. | Printed at London by Thomas Cotes, 1635.

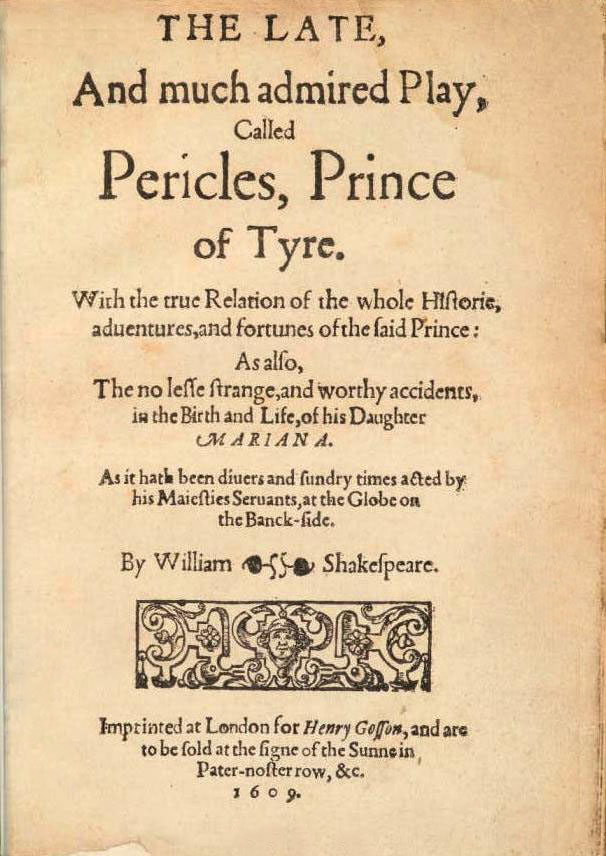
Q1 1609

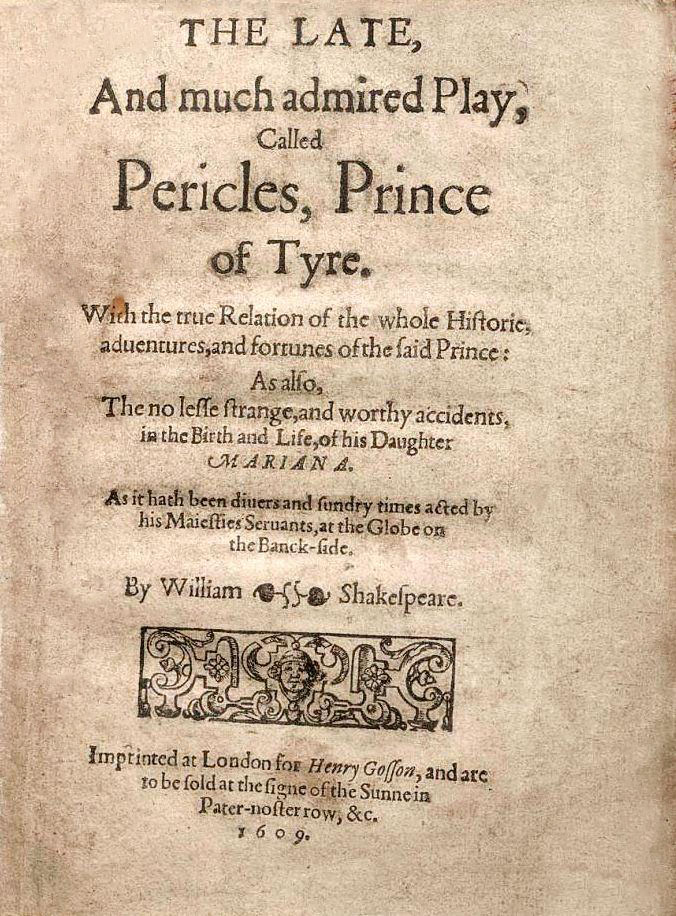
Q2 1609

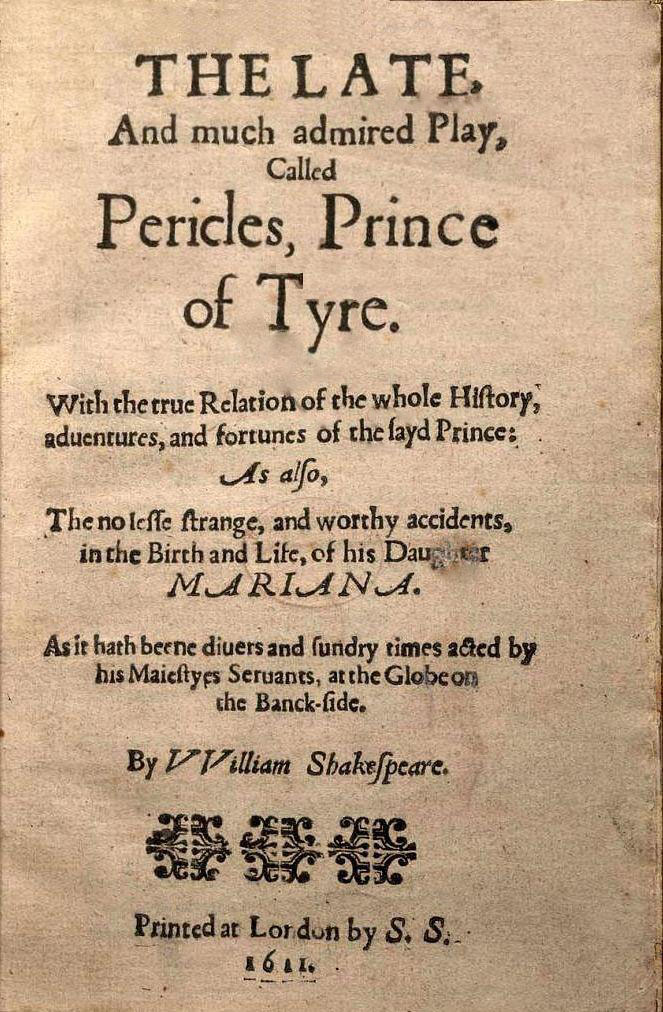
Q3 1611

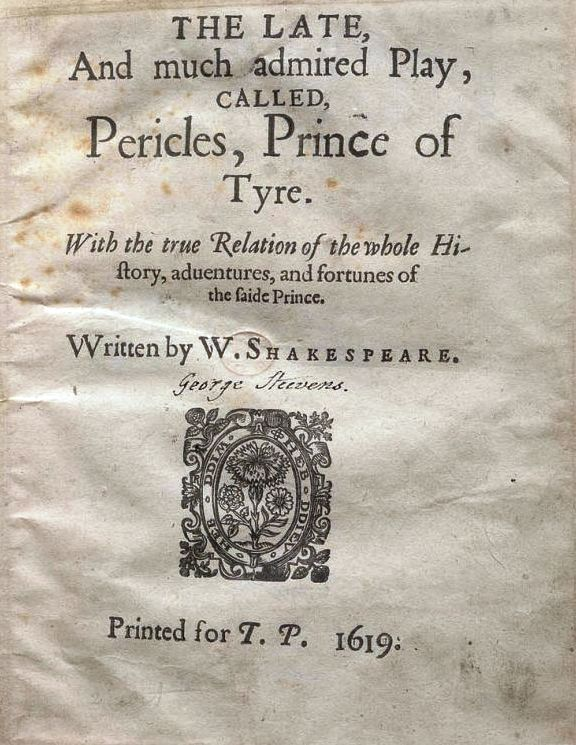
Q4 1st state

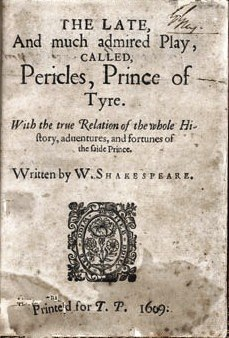
Q4 2nd state

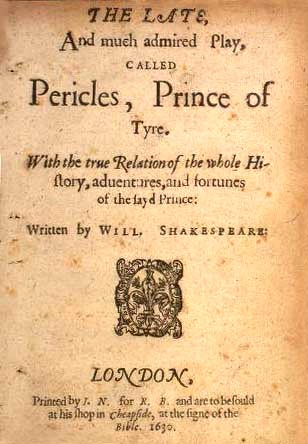
Q5 1630

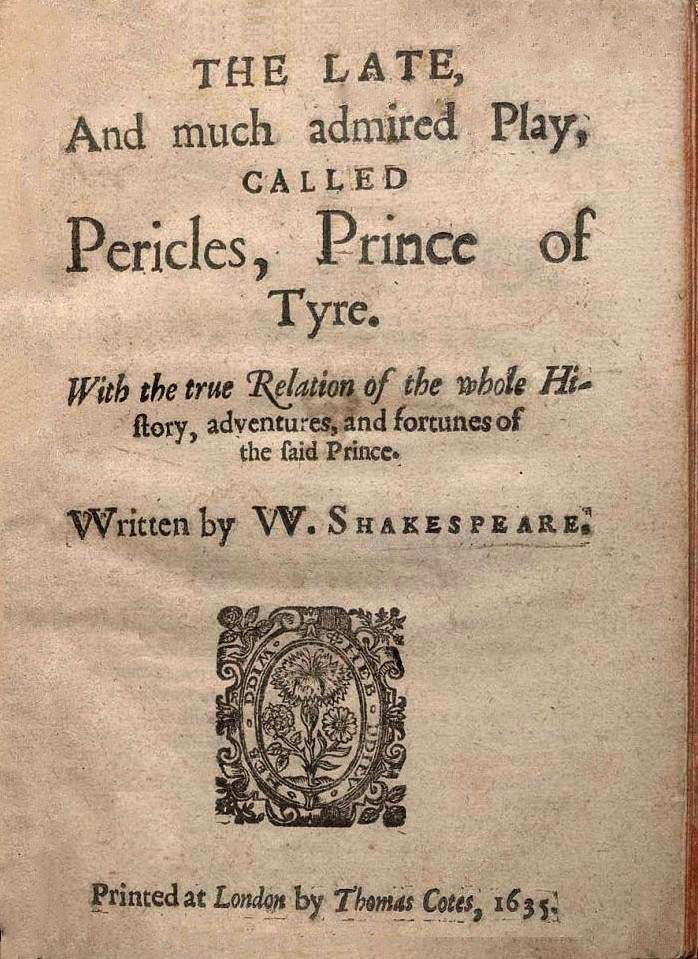
Q6 1635

=== Othello ===
Q1 1622

THE | Tragœdy of Othello, | The Moore of Venice. | As it hath beene diuerse times acted at the | Globe, and at the Black-Friers, by | his Maiesties Seruants. | Written by VVilliam Shakespeare. | LONDON, | Printed by N. O. for Thomas Walkley, and are to be sold at his | shop, at the Eagle and Child, in Brittans Bursse. | 1622.

Q2 1630

THE | Tragœdy of Othello, | The Moore of Venice. | As it hath beene diuerse times acted at the | Globe, and at the Black-Friers, by | his Maiesties Seruants. | Written by VVilliam Shakespeare. | LONDON, | Printed by A. M. for Richard Hawkins, and are to be sold at | his shoppe, in Chancery-Lane, neere Sergeants-Inne. | 1630.

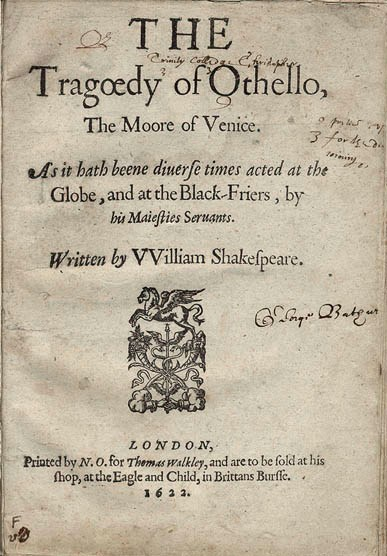
Q1 1622

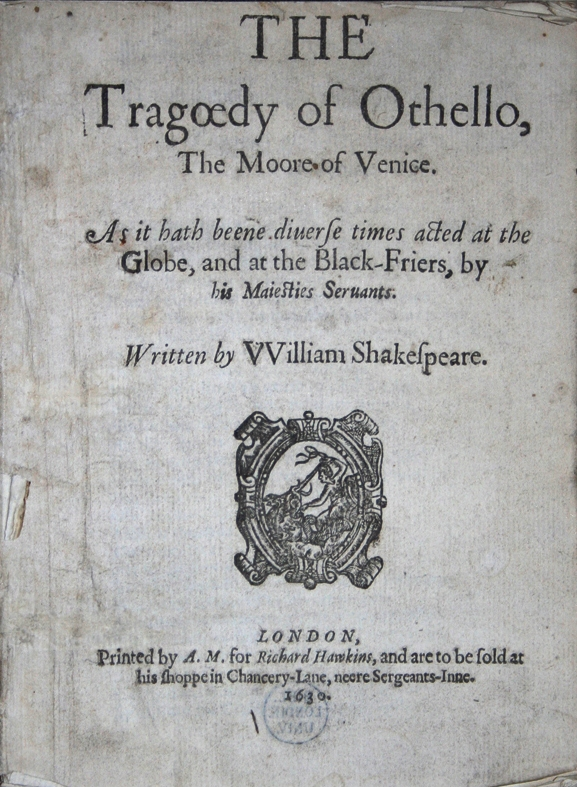
Q2 1630

== Plays first published after 1623 ==
=== The Taming of the Shrew ===
Q 1631

A WITTIE | AND PLEASANT | COMEDIE | Called | The Taming of the Shrew. | As it was acted by his Maiesties | Seruants at the Blacke Friers | and the Globe. | Written by VVill. Shakespeare. | London, | Printed by W. S. [William Stansby] for Iohn Smethwicke, and are to be | sold at his Shop in Saint Dunstones Church- | yard vnder the Diall. | 1631. (72 pp.)

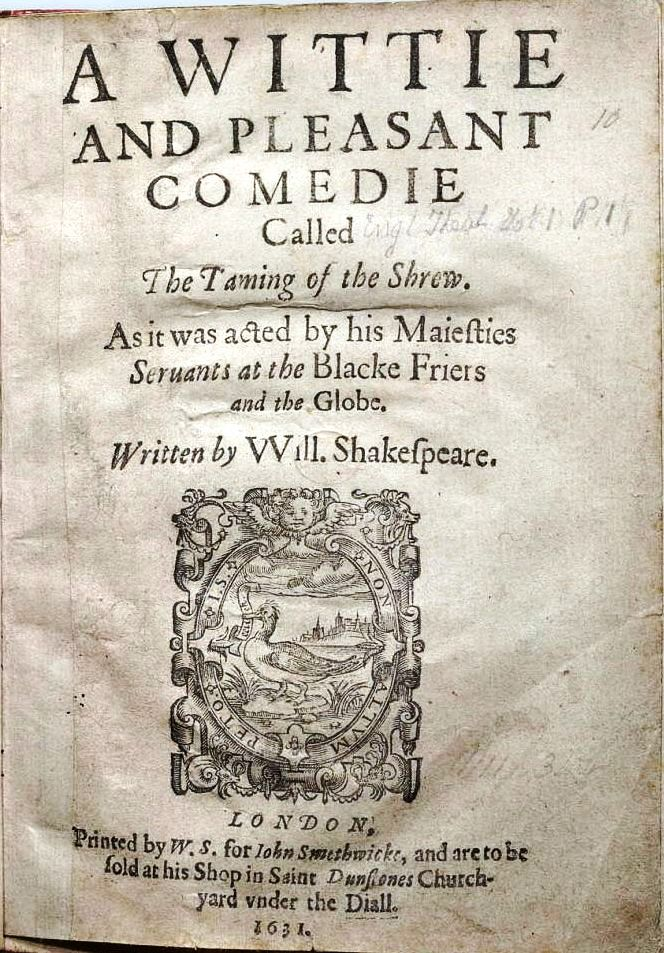
Q 1631

=== Two Noble Kinsmen ===
Q 1634

THE | TWO | NOBLE/KINSMEN: | Presented at the Blackfriers | by the Kings Maiesties servants, | with great applause: | Written by the memorable Worthies/of their time; | {Mr. John Fletcher, and} | {Mr. William Shakespeare.} | Gent. | Printed at London by Tho. Cotes, for Iohn Waterson: | and are to be sold at the signe of the Crowne | in Pauls Church-yard. 1634.

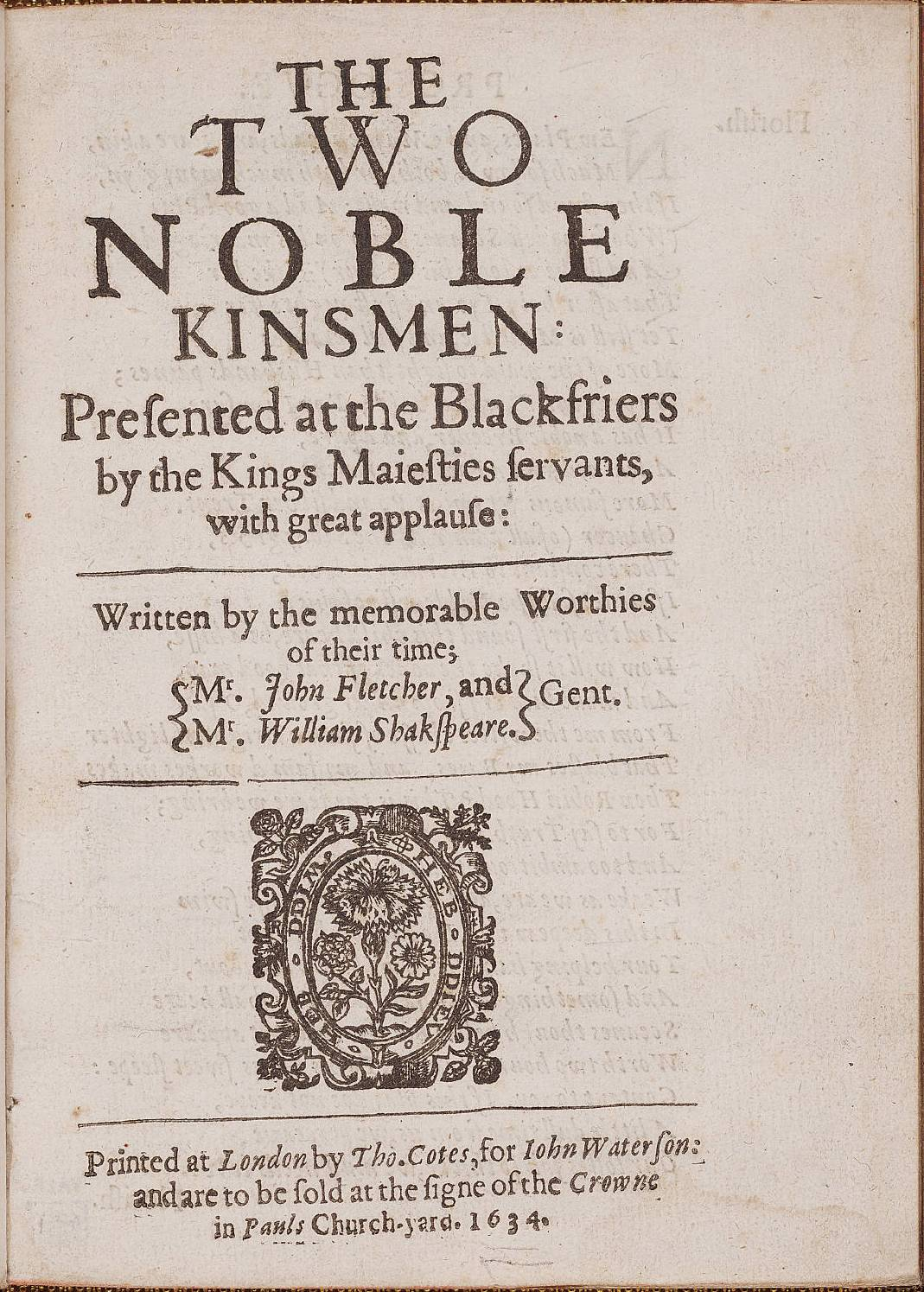
Q 1634
