= List of Shakespearean settings =

This is a list of the settings of Shakespeare's plays. Included are the settings of 38 plays, being the 36 plays contained in the First Folio, and Pericles, Prince of Tyre and The Two Noble Kinsmen.

Places mentioned in Shakespeare's (Note: Throughout this page "Shakespeare" is used as a shorthand for "the author(s) of the play(s)" even though many plays listed are colloborations. See William Shakespeare's collaborations.) text are not listed unless he explicitly set at least one scene there, even where that place is important to the plot such as Syracuse in The Comedy of Errors or Milan in The Tempest. Similarly, the place where an historical or mythical event depicted by Shakespeare is supposed to have happened is not listed unless Shakespeare mentions the setting in the play's text, although these places are sometimes mentioned in the text or footnotes. For example, most editors place act 3 scene 2 of Julius Caesar ("Friends, Romans, countrymen...") at "the Forum" (Note: Most editors have followed Nicholas Rowe in 1709 in placing the "Friends, Romans, countrymen..." scene of Julius Caesar at "the Forum". Shakespeare's text refers to "the market-place".) but there is no listing for the Forum on this page because Shakespeare's text does not specify it.

Contents:

Nations, cities and towns:

A | B | C | D | E | F | G | H | I | K | L | M | N | O | P | R | S | T | V | W | Y

Less-specific settings

More-specific settings

Wars and battles

Settings by scene:

All's Well That Ends Well | Antony and Cleopatra | As You Like It | The Comedy of Errors | Coriolanus | Cymbeline | Hamlet | Henry IV, Part 1 | Henry IV, Part 2 | Henry V | Henry VI, Part 1 | Henry VI, Part 2 | Henry VI, Part 3 | Henry VIII | Julius Caesar | King John | King Lear | Love's Labour's Lost | Macbeth | Measure for Measure | The Merchant of Venice | The Merry Wives of Windsor | A Midsummer Night's Dream | Much Ado About Nothing | Othello | Pericles, Prince of Tyre | Richard II | Richard III | Romeo and Juliet | The Taming of the Shrew | The Tempest | Timon of Athens | Titus Andronicus | Troilus and Cressida | Twelfth Night | The Two Gentlemen of Verona | The Two Noble Kinsmen | The Winter's Tale

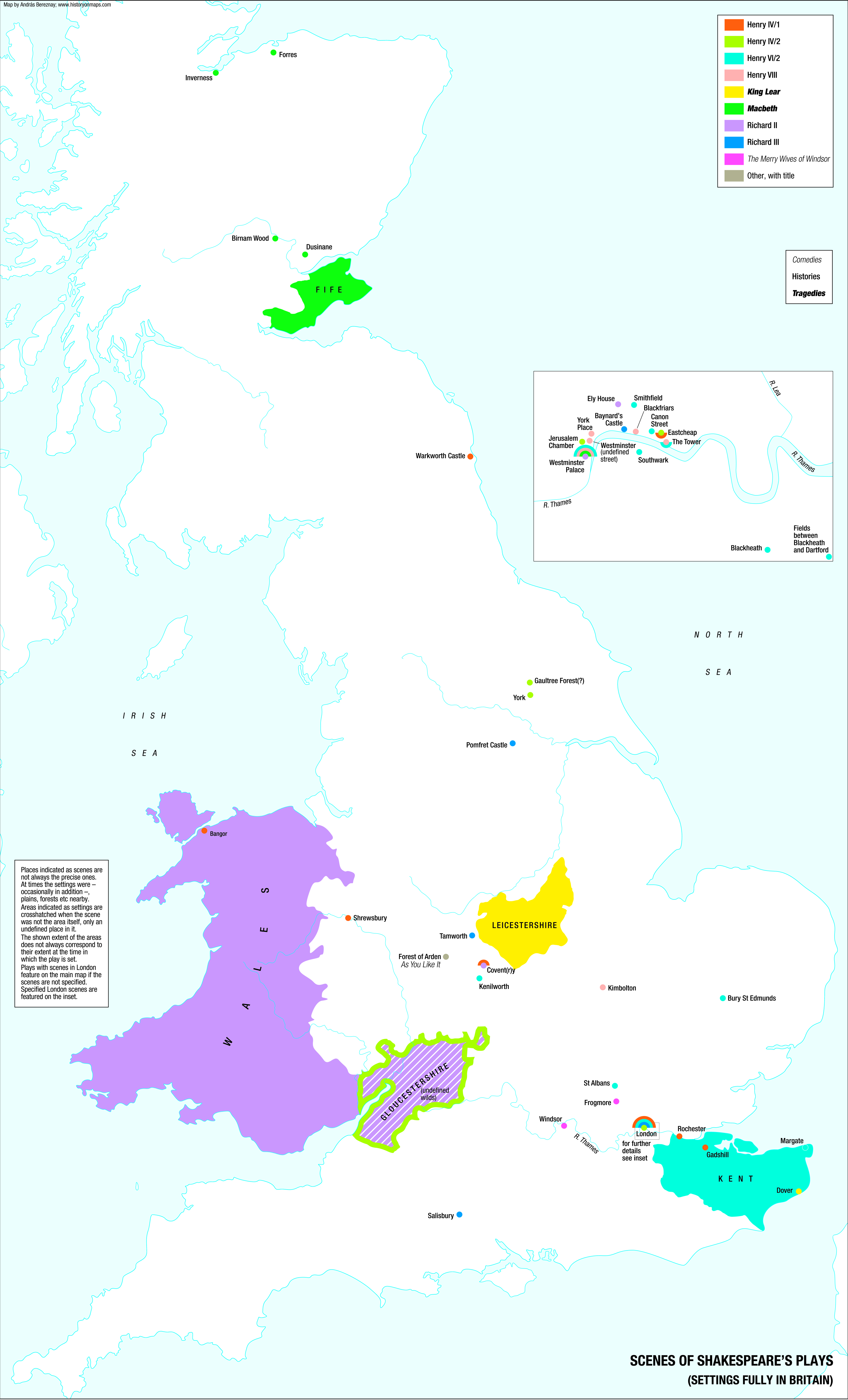
Settings in Britain

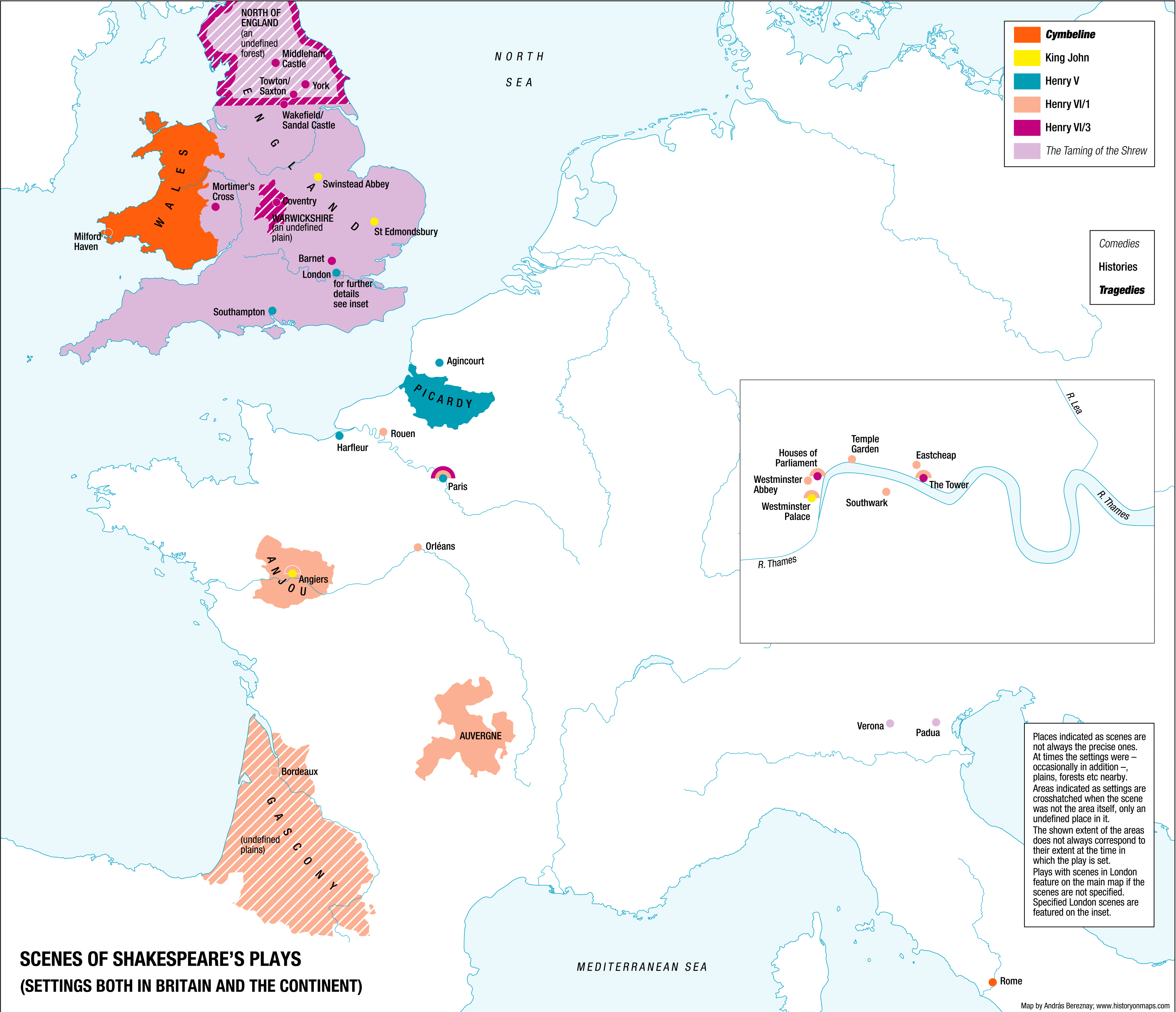
Settings in Britain and France

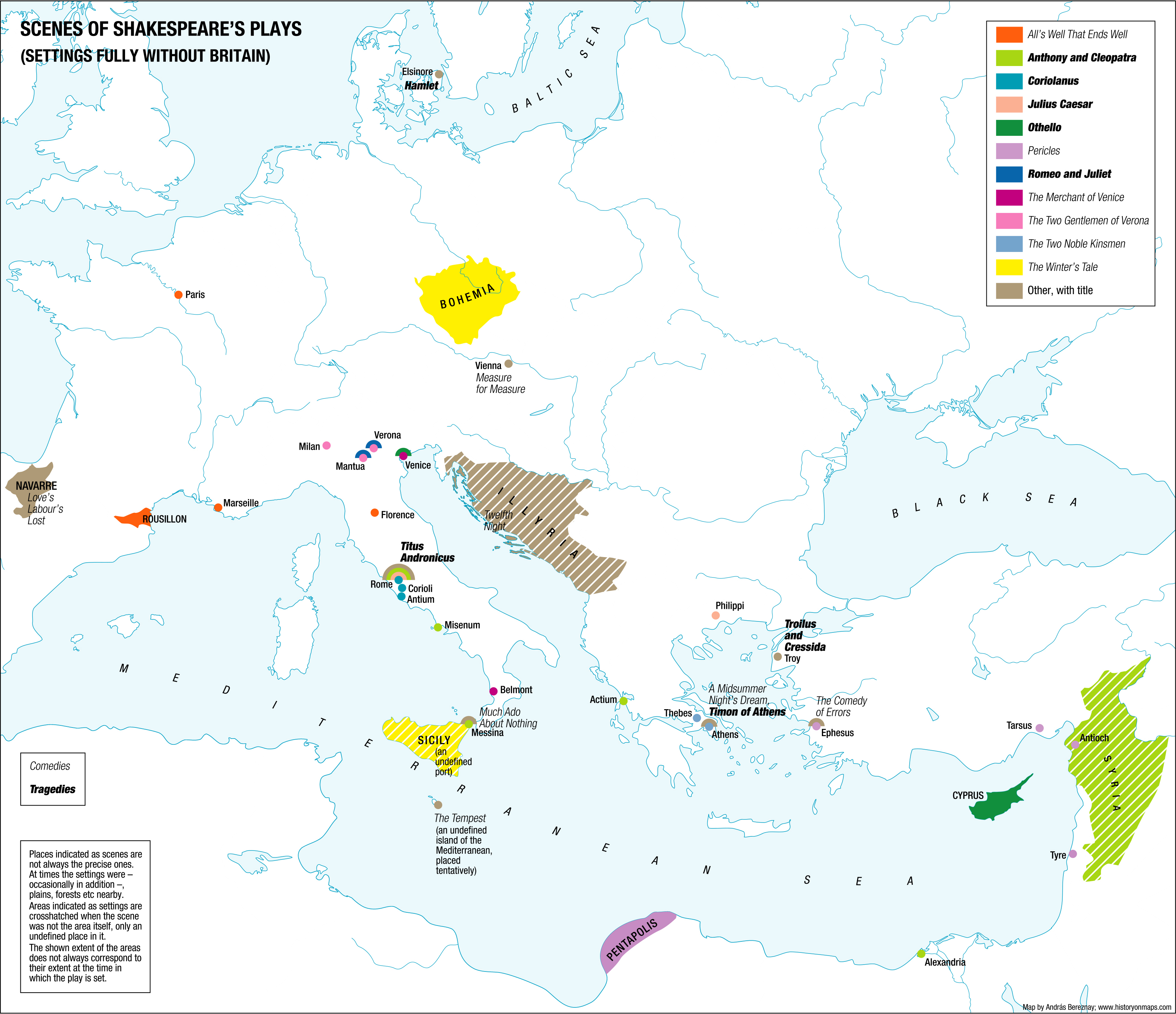
Settings elsewhere

== Nations, cities and towns ==
=== A ===
- Actium in Greece is the location of Antony's and Cleopatra's preparations for the Battle of Actium, and of the sea battle's spectators, in Antony and Cleopatra.
- For Albania see "Illyria".
- Alexandria:
  - See also "Cleopatra's Monument" under more-specific settings below.
  - Alexandria in Egypt is the setting of the greatest number of scenes in Antony and Cleopatra. Also a number of scenes are set outside its walls, and in the camp of the Romans attacking it.
- Angiers (Angers in France) and the camps and battlefields in its vicinity, especially the pavilion of the French king, are the settings of the second and third acts of King John.
- Antioch in modern-day Turkey - but in the play referred to as located in Syria - is the setting of the opening scene, with its incest sub-plot, in Pericles.
- Antium in present-day Italy is the Volscian city to which the banished Coriolanus travels to forge an alliance with Aufidius, in Coriolanus, and is the setting of the play's climax. (Note: There has been critical debate about whether the closing scene of Coriolanus is set at Antium, which is its location in Shakespeare's source: North's translation of Plutarch's Parallel Lives. The only lines placing it there, indirectly, are the references to Aufidius' "native town" and to "the Antiates". Other lines may be taken to place the scene at Corioli: Aufidius says "Dost thou think I'll grace thee with that robbery, they stol'n name, 'Coriolanus', in Corioles?". Singer located the scene at Corioli. Peter Holland summarises the debate: "All that really matters to Shakespeare (and to audiences, who never notice a problem) is that it is set in Volscian territory.")
- Athens:
  - See also "Forest" under less-specific settings, below.
  - Athens in modern-day Greece is the setting of a short scene between Antony and his new wife Octavia, in Antony and Cleopatra.
  - Athens in modern-day Greece, but in the world of the play a city-state governed by a duke - and a forest outside its walls - are the settings of A Midsummer Night's Dream.
  - Athens in modern-day Greece - and a forest outside its walls - are the settings of Timon of Athens.
  - Athens in modern-day Greece, but in the world of the play a city-state governed by duke Theseus accompanied by his wife Hippolyta, is the primary setting of The Two Noble Kinsmen.
- For Austria see "Vienna".

=== B ===
- Barnet in England is the site of the Battle of Barnet, at which Warwick died, and which is dramatized in Henry VI, Part 3.
- Belmont is a fictional estate some twenty miles from Venice, Italy: the home of Portia and her household, and the setting of the "casket" scenes, and of the play's conclusion, in The Merchant of Venice.
- For Berkeley see "Berkeley Castle" under more-specific settings below.
- For Berwick see the "England" entry for Henry VI, Part 3.
- Bohemia, the landlocked modern-day Czechia, is, in The Winter's Tale, a coastal kingdom of which Polixenes is the king. It is the setting of the end of Act 3 and the whole of the long act 4.
- Bordeaux in France is the setting of the defeat of Talbot, and of the deaths of him and his son John, in Henry VI, Part 1. In two related parallel scenes without specific locations, York and his army, then Somerset and his army, fail to send reinforcements to Talbot. (Note: See Henry VI, Part 1 act 4 scenes 3 & 4.)
- For Bosnia and Herzegovina see "Illyria".
- Bosworth in England, site of the battle of Bosworth Field, including the camps of both armies, and the tents of the leaders Richmond and Richard, are the settings of the climactic scenes of Richard III.
- For Bristol see "Bristol Castle" under more-specific settings below.
- Britain:
  - See also "England", "Scotland" and "Wales".
  - Britain in the Roman era is the primary setting of Cymbeline. Shakespeare does not locate King Cymbeline's court any more precisely.
  - Britain in the pre-Christian era is the only setting of King Lear. In the world of the play the only location specified is Dover. The other significant settings (the homes of Lear, of Goneril and Albany, and of Gloucester, and the various outdoor settings) are not identified any more specifically.
- For Bury St Edmunds see "St Edmundsbury".

=== C ===
- Corioli (typically spelled Corioles in the First Folio) in modern-day Italy, although its precise location is unknown - and the battlefield and the trenches of the Romans attacking it - are the settings of the scenes in which Caius Martius earns the honorary name "Coriolanus", in Coriolanus.
- Coventry:
  - Coventry in England is the setting of the lists at which Mowbray and Bolingbroke are scheduled to fight in Richard II.
  - Near Coventry, in England, Falstaff delivers a soliloquy about his abuse of the King's press, in Henry IV, Part 1.
  - Coventry in England is the setting of Clarence's defection back to Edward's party, in Henry VI, Part 3.
- For Croatia see "Illyria".
- Cyprus is the setting of the last four acts of Othello. No specific town or city within Cyprus is mentioned.
- For Czechia see "Bohemia".

=== D ===
- For Denmark see "Elsinore".
- Dover in England and various places in its vicinity, including the camps of the French and British armies nearby, are settings in the latter half of King Lear.

=== E ===
- For Egypt see "Alexandria" and, under more-specific settings below, "Cleopatra's Monument".
- Elsinore:
  - See also "Graveyard" under less-specific settings, below.
  - Elsinore (i.e. Helsingør in Denmark), particularly its castle and its environs, are the only settings of Hamlet. The only scenes outside the castle are one on the Danish coast (act 4 scene 4) where Hamlet sees the Norwegian forces, and one set in a graveyard (act 5 scene 1).
- England:
  - See also "Barnet", "Bosworth", "Coventry", "Dover", "London", "Rochester", "Salisbury", "Shrewsbury", "Southampton", "St Albans", "St Edmundsbury", "Tewkesbury", "Wakefield", "Windsor" and "York", and, under less-specific settings, below, "Castle", and, under more-specific settings below, "Baynard's Castle", "Blackfriars", "Eastcheap", "Ely House", "Forest of Arden", "Gad's Hill", "Garter Inn", "Gaultree Forest", "Gloucestershire", "Herne's Oak" "Kenilworth Castle", "Kimbolton Castle", "Pomfret Castle" "Southwark", "Swinstead Abbey" "Temple Garden", "Tower of London" "Westminster Palace" and "York Place".
  - See also "English Court" under more-specific settings below.
  - The frame story of The Taming of the Shrew (i.e. the two scenes of the "Induction" and a short exchange at the end of act 1 scene 1), in which the drunken tinker Christopher Sly is persuaded he is a lord and is invited to watch a play, has no specified setting, but appears to be in England since Sly claims to be from Burton Heath, Warwickshire, and to know a "fat alewife of Wincot".
  - England, probably at the court of Edward the Confessor, is the setting of a lengthy scene in which Malcolm tests Macduff's loyalty, and then Macduff learns of the murder of his family, in Macbeth.
  - England, somewhere near the border by Berwick (which was, at the time the play is set, in Scotland), King Henry visits his former dominions, and is captured by two keepers, in Henry VI, Part 3.
  - "England" is the only location given in a stage direction in Henry VI, Part 3, presumably to clarify the location since the scene (act 4 scene 2) includes French soldiers. Neither it nor the following scene, in which Warwick's powers overcome Edward's guards at his tent and take him prisoner, is given any more specific location.
- Ephesus:
  - See also "Diana's Temple at Ephesus" under more-specific settings, below.
  - Ephesus, in modern-day Turkey, but in the play a city state governed by a Duke, is the only setting of The Comedy of Errors.
  - Ephesus, in modern-day Turkey, is the scene of Thaisa's rescue by Cerimon, and later of Thaisa's reconciliation with Pericles at Diana's temple, in Pericles.

=== F ===
- Fife in Scotland is the home of Lady Macduff and her children, and the setting of their murders in act 4 scene 2 of Macbeth.
- For Flint see "Flint Castle" under more-specific settings below.
- Florence, in modern-day Italy but in the play an independent state governed by a duke, is the place to which Bertram runs away to take part in the Tuscan Wars, in All's Well That Ends Well, and is the setting of the gulling of Paroles, and of the bed-trick played upon Bertram by Helen and Diana.
- Forres in Scotland is the site of Duncan's court in the early part of Macbeth.
- France:
  - See also "Angiers", "Bordeaux", "Harfleur", "Marseille", "Orleans", "Paris", "Rouen", "Roussillon" and, under less-specific settings, below, "Battlefield" and "Castle", and, under more-specific settings below, "Agincourt", "Auvergne", "Forest of Arden" and "French Court".
  - France is the location of As You Like It. The location of the scenes in Duke Frederick's court, and at Oliver's house, are not specified any more accurately.
  - France is the location of most of the last four acts of Henry V. Some scenes are not located more specifically, but occur on the march between Harfleur and Calais.

=== G ===
- For Greece see "Actium", "Athens", "Mytilene", "Philippi" and "Thebes".

=== H ===
- Harfleur in France is the setting of the Siege of Harfleur, dramatized in the third act of Henry V.
- For Harlech see "Wales".
- For Helsingør see "Elsinore".
- For Higham see "Gad's Hill" under more-specific settings below.

=== I ===
- Illyria, a coastal region on the eastern Adriatic sea, including parts of modern-day Croatia, Bosnia and Herzegovina, Montenegro and Albania, is the only setting of Twelfth Night.
- Inverness in Scotland is the location of Macbeth's castle prior to his becoming king, and is the setting of the events surrounding the murder of Duncan, in Macbeth.
- For Iran see "Parthia".
- For Iraq see "Parthia".
- For Italy see "Antium", "Belmont", "Corioli", "Florence", "Mantua", "Messina", "Milan", "Padua", "Rome", "Sicily", "Venice", "Verona" and, under more-specific settings below, "Capitol" and "Pompey's Galley".

=== K ===
- For Kenilworth see "Kenilworth Castle" under more-specific settings below.
- For Kimbolton see "Kimbolton Castle" under more-specific settings below.

=== L ===
- For Libya see "Pentapolis".

"It is a truism that every Shakespearean city is always, to some degree, London."

— Kent Cartwright
- London:
  - See also "English Court" under more-specific settings below.
  - See also "Baynard's Castle", "Blackfriars", "Eastcheap", "Ely House", "Southwark", "Temple Garden", "Tower of London", "Westminster Palace" and "York Place" under more-specific settings below, and "Road" under less-specific settings below.
  - London and Kent provide a series of settings for the rebellion of Jack Cade and its aftermath, dramatized in Henry VI, Part 2. Among the locations speculated by editors from clues in the text or from historical sources, but not explicitly stated by Shakespeare, are Blackheath, Sevenoaks, Cannon Street and Smithfield. The home of Alexander Iden, who captures and kills Jack Cade, has been placed in the counties of Sussex or Kent. (Note: Iden describes himself as "a squire of Kent" and Shakespeare sets the scene at his garden. In Shakespeare's sources the historical story is different: Alexander Iden was a Sheriff actively tracking-down Cade, which he did at Heathfield in Sussex.) See also "Tower of London" and "Southwark" under more-specific settings below.

=== M ===
- Mantua in present-day Italy is the city to which Romeo flees when exiled in Romeo and Juliet, where he hears of Juliet's supposed death and purchases the poison which will eventually kill him.
- Marseille, in France, is the setting of a short scene in All's Well That Ends Well. Helen, Diana and the Widow have followed the King there, only to learn that he has moved on to Roussillon.
- Messina:
  - See also "Pompey's Court" under more-specific settings below.
  - Messina, on Sicily in modern-day Italy, is the only location of Much Ado About Nothing.
- Milan:
  - See also "Forest" under less-specific settings, below.
  - Milan in modern-day Italy, but in the play governed by a duke, is the setting of most of the action of The Two Gentlemen of Verona.
- Milford Haven in Wales, and the area surrounding it, are the settings of most of the second half of Cymbeline, including the cave of Belarius, the site of the battle between Rome and Britain, and the denouement at Cymbeline's camp.
- For Montenegro see "Illyria".
- Mytilene on Lesbos in modern-day Greece is the location of the brothel to which Marina is sold, and is the setting (together with Pericles' ship, while moored there) of much of the last two acts of Pericles.

=== N ===
- For Naples see "Pompey's Galley" under more-specific settings, and "Sea" under less-specific settings, below.
- Navarre in present-day Spain but in the play an independent kingdom whose fictional king, Ferdinand, is one of the central characters, is the only setting of Love's Labour's Lost.

=== O ===
- Orleans:
  - Near Orleans in France is the site of the Dauphin's first meeting with Joan in Henry VI, Part 1.
  - Orleans in France is the site of the first conflict between Joan and Talbot in Henry VI, Part 1. (Note: See also: Siege of Orléans.)

=== P ===
- Padua in modern-day Italy is the primary setting of The Taming of the Shrew.
- Paris:
  - See also "French Court" under more-specific settings below.
  - Paris, in France, is the setting of the court scenes of All's Well That Ends Well.
  - Paris in France is the setting of Henry VI's coronation and the events surrounding it in Henry VI, Part 1.
- Parthia at its border with the Roman Empire in modern-day Syria, Iran or Iraq is the scene of Ventidius' victory over Pacorus, in Antony and Cleopatra.
- Pentapolis in modern-day Libya is the setting of the middle-part of Pericles, where the title character is shipwrecked, and meets his wife Thaisa. (Note: There were seven cities named Pentapolis in the ancient world. Suzanne Gossett concludes that Cyrene in Libya is the setting in the play, by reference to the source Historia Appoloni in which it is referred to as "Pentapolitanus Cyrenaeorum terras".)
- Philippi, in Macedonia in present-day Greece, is the site of the Battle of Philippi which forms the action of the fifth act of Julius Caesar.
- For Pontefract see "Pomfret Castle" under more-specific settings below.

=== R ===
"Rome, dominated by men, appears as a daylight world of conquest, rationality, and self-sacrifice. Eqypt, dominated by women, appears as a night-time world of love, fantasy and self-indulgence."

— Robert S. Miola
- Rochester:
  - See also "Gad's Hill" under more-specific settings below.
  - Rochester in Kent, England, is the setting of a scene in an inn yard in Henry IV, Part 1 in which the Gad's Hill robbery is planned.
- Rome:
  - See also "Capitol" under more-specific settings and "Forest" under less-specific settings, below.
  - Rome in modern-day Italy is the secondary setting of Antony and Cleopatra, contrasted throughout the play with Alexandria.
  - Rome in modern-day Italy, and later in the play the camp of the Volscian army threatening it, are the primary settings of Coriolanus.
  - Rome in modern-day Italy is the site of the home of Philario, where Posthumus encounters Iachimo and wagers upon Innogen's loyalty, and also the setting of a short scene between two senators and a tribune at the end of act 3, of Cymbeline.
  - Rome in modern-day Italy is the settling of the whole of the first three acts of Julius Caesar.
  - Rome in modern-day Italy, together with a forest outside it, and the camp of the Goths led by Lucius preparing to attack it, are the only settings of Titus Andronicus.
- Rouen:
  - See also "French Court" under more-specific settings below.
  - Rouen in France is captured by Joan and the French, then recaptured by Talbot and the English, in Henry VI, Part 1, and is the site of the Duke of Burgundy's defection to the French side; and later is the scene of Joan's execution at the stake.
- Roussillon in France, of which Bertram is the young Count, is a setting of several episodes in All's Well That Ends Well, including its beginning and ending.

=== S ===
- Salisbury in England is the setting of the death of Buckingham in Richard III.
- Sardis in present-day Turkey, at Brutus' camp and mainly in his tent, is the setting of most of Act 4 of Julius Caesar, including the conflict between Brutus and Cassius and the first appearance of Caesar's ghost.
- Scotland:
  - See also "Fife", "Forres" and "Inverness", and, under more-specific settings below, "Birnam Wood" and "Dunsinane Hill".
  - Scotland is the setting of most of Macbeth: and the witches' scenes and most outdoor scenes do not have any more specific setting.
- Shrewsbury in England, the camps of the opposing forces, and the battlefield, are the settings of the Battle of Shrewsbury, which comprises most of the action of the last two acts of Henry IV, Part 1.
- Sicily:
  - See also "Messina", and, under more-specific settings below, "Pompey's court".
  - Sicilia in modern day Italy, but in the world of the play a kingdom of which Leontes is the king, is the setting of acts 1, 2, most of 3, and 5 of The Winter's Tale.
- Southampton in England is the setting of Henry's departure for France, and of the exposure of the traitors Cambridge, Scroop and Grey, in Henry V.
- For Spain see "Navarre".
- St Albans in England is the setting of several scenes surrounding Cardinal Beaufort's opposition to the Lord Protector in Henry VI, Part 2, and later the play climaxes at the Battle of St Albans.
- St Edmundsbury (i.e. Bury St Edmunds in England) is the setting of a battle between the forces of King John and the Dauphin in the final act of King John.
- For Syria see "Antioch" and "Parthia".

=== T ===
- Tarsus in modern-day Turkey is the place where the child Marina is fostered to Cleon and Dionyza, and the location of the later plot to murder her, in Pericles.
- Tewkesbury in England is the site of the Battle of Tewkesbury, which secured Edward's victory, and which is dramatized in Henry VI, Part 3.
- Thebes in modern-day Greece, but in the play governed by the tyrant Creon, is the setting of our first encounter with Palamon and Arcite, the title characters of The Two Noble Kinsmen.
- For Towton see "York".
- Troy:
  - See also "Ilium" under more-specific settings below.
  - Troy in modern-day Turkey, the camp of the Greek soldiers besieging it, and the battlefield outside it, are the settings of Troilus and Cressida.
- For Tunis see "Sea" under less-specific settings, below.
- For Turkey see "Antioch", "Ephesus", "Sardis", "Tarsus" and "Troy" and, under more-specific settings below, "Ilium".
- Tyre in modern-day Lebanon is the home of the title character of Pericles, Prince of Tyre and the setting of several scenes in the first act, before he embarks upon the journey which comprises most of the play's plot.

=== V ===
- Venice:
  - See also "Sagittary" under more-specific settings below.
  - Venice in modern-day Italy, but in the play governed by a duke, is the primary setting of The Merchant of Venice.
  - Venice in modern-day Italy, but in the play governed by a duke, is the setting of the first act of Othello.
- Verona:
  - Verona in modern-day Italy is the main setting of Romeo and Juliet.
  - Verona in modern-day Italy is the home of Petruchio in The Taming of the Shrew, and the setting of most of the 4th act.
  - Verona in modern-day Italy is the original home of Julia, Valentine and Proteus in The Two Gentlemen of Verona and is the setting of most of the first two acts.
- Vienna:
  - Vienna in present-day Austria, although not literally a setting of Hamlet, is the setting of its play-within-a-play The Murder of Gonzago, also known as The Mousetrap.
  - Vienna in present-day Austria, but in the play a city state governed by a duke, is the only setting of Measure for Measure.

=== W ===
- Wakefield in England is the site of the Battle of Wakefield, dramatized in Henry VI, Part 3, in which young Rutland, and later his father the Duke of York, are killed by Clifford and the Queen.
- Wales:
  - See also "Milford Haven" and, under more-specific settings below, "Flint Castle".
  - Wales is the setting of two related scenes in Richard II. In the first, which is given no more specific location, the Earl of Salisbury is abandoned by the king's Welsh forces. (Note: Historically, according to Shakespeare's source Holinshed, these events occurred at Conwy.) The related scene of King Richard's return from Ireland to discover he has no military support is, in the text, set near "Barkloughly Castle", which means Harlech Castle. (Note: Historically, on returning from Ireland, Richard instead landed at Milford Haven.)
  - Wales, without being specified more accurately in the text, is the location of Glendower's court, where the rebels - Glendower, Mortimer, Worcester and Hotspur - meet to plan the division of the kingdom, in Henry IV, Part 1. (Note: Shakepeare's source, Holinshed, places the meeting of Glendower and the other rebels at the home of the Archdeacon of Bangor.)
- Windsor
  - See also, under more-specific settings below, "The Garter Inn" and "Herne's Oak".
  - Windsor in England and its environs are the only setting of The Merry Wives of Windsor.

=== Y ===
- York:
  - See also "Park" under less-specific settings below.
  - York in England is the place where Queen Margaret has had the Duke of York's head placed above the gates in Henry VI, Part 3.
  - Near York in England, and immediately following the scene mentioned above, are several battle scenes which dramatize the Battle of Towton, although Shakespeare does not mention Towton as a location, in Henry VI, Part 3.
  - York in England is the setting of a stand-off where Edward is, at first, barred the gates by the Mayor, and then of the alliance between Edward and Montgomery, in Henry VI, Part 3.

== Less-specific settings ==
- Battlefield:
  - For specific battlefields, see the entry for the place after which the battle is named.
  - An unnamed battlefield is the setting of a supernatural scene in which Joan communes with fiends, in Henry VI, Part 1, followed by her capture, and then Suffolk captures Margaret. Historically, Joan was captured at Compiègne in France, and Suffolk's capture of Margaret is unhistorical.
- Castle:
  - For specific castles identified by Shakespeare, see more-specific settings below.
  - A castle somewhere in England is the setting of the death of Arthur in King John. There is an internal scene in which Arthur persuades Hubert not to kill him, and an external scene in which Arthur dies in trying to escape, and his body is discovered. Shakespeare gives no indication which castle is intended: speculation has included Northampton, Dover, Canterbury or the Tower of London. Historically, Arthur was not held in England at all, but at Rouen Castle in France.
  - In Henry IV, several scenes (act 2 scene 3 of Part 1, and act 1 scene 1 and act 2 scene 3 of Part 2) are set at the castles which are the homes of Hotspur and Northumberland, without the location being specified other than being described by Rumour as "this worm-eaten hole of ragged stone". Historically in both cases this would have been Warkworth Castle.
  - In Henry VI, Part 3, a scene is set at "your Castle", near Wakefield: meaning York's. Historically, that was Sandal Castle.
- Forest:
  - Where a setting is a named forest which exists in the real world, it is listed instead under more-specific settings below.
  - A forest outside Athens is the primary location of the middle three acts of A Midsummer Night's Dream.
  - A forest outside Athens - featuring the mouth of a cave in which Timon is dwelling - is the setting of much of the last two acts of Timon of Athens.
  - A forest outside Athens is the setting of the middle act of The Two Noble Kinsmen.
  - A forest outside Milan is the home of the outlaws of whom Valentine becomes the leader in The Two Gentlemen of Verona, and is the setting of the play's climax.
  - A forest near Rome is the setting of the second act of Titus Andronicus, comprising the murder of Bassianus and the framing of Titus' sons for it, and of the rape and mutilation of Lavinia.
- Gaol:
  - An unspecified gaol is the setting of the (unhistorical) meeting of York with Mortimer in Henry VI, Part 1.
- Graveyard:
  - A graveyard near Elsinore is the setting of the "Alas, poor Yorick" sequence, and of the funeral of Ophelia, in act 5 scene 1 of Hamlet.
- Island:
  - An unnamed remote island is the setting of the whole of The Tempest except for the opening storm scene at sea.
- Park:
  - A park, where Edward is out hunting accompanied by his captors, is the setting of the rescue of Edward by Richard and his followers, in Henry VI, Part 3. The only textual hint to its location is that Edward is the prisoner of the Bishop of York. Historically, Edward was held at Middleham Castle, in Yorkshire.
- Road:
  - The road from Verona to Padua is the setting of the "How bright and goodly shines the moon!" scene of The Taming of the Shrew.
  - The Road from Rome to Antium may be the setting of a scene in Coriolanus. (Note: This scene, between a Roman soldier and a Volsce soldier, may occur on the road between Rome and Antium, as suggested by Malone. Rowe set it at Antium.)
  - The road to the Tower of London is the setting of the final parting of Queen Isabel and King Richard, in Richard II.
  - The road to Westminster Abbey, for the coronation of Henry V, is the setting of the climax - with the final rejection of Falstaff - of Henry IV, Part 2.
  - On a march sometime after the Battle of Wakefield the three sons of York witness the vision of the three suns in the sky, learn the details of their father's death, and meet Warwick who gives them the bad news of the outcome of the second battle of St Albans, in Henry VI, Part 3. (Note: Historically, according to Shakespeare's source (Hall) Edward and Warwick met at Chipping Norton.) (Note: Historically, the apparition of the three suns was supposedly seen at the Battle of Mortimer's Cross, which is not otherwise dramatized by Shakespeare.)
  - A street in London is the setting of several scenes in Henry VIII, in which some gentlemen meet to discuss the affairs of the day, and in one case to witness the coronation procession of Anne Bullen.
- Ship:
  - Pericles' ship, on its voyage around the Mediterranean, is the setting of various scenes in Pericles.
  - A ship threatened by a storm on a voyage from Tunis to Naples is the setting of the opening scene of The Tempest.

== More-specific settings ==
Locations identified as being in or around the home of a specific character are not listed, including where that home is a "castle", "cave" or "cell". Similarly, the "court" of any character who is a ruler is not listed unless Shakespeare gives it a specific location. Also not listed are generic locations such as "abbey", "brothel", "mart", "palace", "prison", "seashore" or "street", nor buildings given fictional names such as "the Porpentine", "the Phoenix" and others in The Comedy of Errors or "the Elephant" in Twelfth Night.

Military camps are not listed separately, and where relevant are mentioned under the name of the city being besieged or the place after which the battle is named.

Many Shakespearean characters are named after places: usually because they are known by their noble title rather than their actual name. This list does not assume that the homes of those characters are in that place unless Shakespeare's text explicitly places them there: even where that was true of the historical person upon whom the character is based. For example, there is no listing on this page for Gloucester in England (although see "Gloucestershire" below) even though there are characters usually described as Gloucester in King Lear, Henry IV (Part 2), Henry V, all three parts of Henry VI, and Richard III, and some scenes are set at their homes.

- Agincourt (i.e. Azincourt in France) the site of the Battle of Agincourt, and the camps of the French and English soldiers, are the settings of the main episode of Henry V including Henry's decisive victory.
- For Arden or Ardennes see "Forest of Arden".
- Auvergne in France is the setting of the Countess of Auvergne's attempt to entrap Talbot, in Henry VI, Part 1.
- For Barkloughly Castle in Richard II, see "Wales" under nations, cities and towns above.
- Baynard's Castle, then in London, England (not to be confused with Barnard Castle) is the setting of the Lord Mayor and citizens' plea to Richard to become king, in Richard III.
- Berkeley Castle is the destination of a scene in which the Duke of York encounters Bolingbroke and his supporters, in Richard II.
- Birnam Wood in Scotland is the rendezvous of the Scottish and English forces opposing Macbeth, in Macbeth. In a short scene set there, Malcolm fulfils the witches' prophecy that "Macbeth shall never vanquished be until great Birnam Wood to high Dunsinane Hill shall come against him" by ordering his soldiers to each cut down a bough from the forest and carry it before them.
- Blackfriars in London, England, is the setting of the trial of Queen Katherine in Henry VIII, (Note: The site of the annulment of Katherine's marriage to Henry later became the site of Blackfriars Theatre at which Shakespeare's company the King's Men performed.) and of the subsequent scene (historically at the adjoining Bridewell Palace) in which Katherine and her women commune with Wolsey and Campeius.
- For Boar's Head see "Eastcheap".
- Bristol Castle is the scene of the condemnation and deaths of Bushy and Green in Richard II.
- Capitol:
  - Peter Holland, referring to Shakespeare's plays set in Ancient Rome, says: "Shakespeare appears to have assumed that the Capitol was the seat of the Senate but it was properly, to be pedantic, the temple of Jupiter on the Capitoline Hill while the Senate met near the Forum."
  - The Capitol in Rome in present-day Italy is where Coriolanus stands for the role of Consul, in Coriolanus.
  - The Capitol in Rome in present-day Italy is the setting of the murder of Caesar in Julius Caesar.
- Cleopatra's Monument in Alexandria, Egypt, is the setting of the climax of Antony and Cleopatra, including the deaths of both title characters.
- Diana's Temple at Ephesus is the scene of the climax of Pericles, the reconciliation of Pericles and Thaisa.
- Dunsinane Hill in Scotland is fortified by Macbeth, and is the site of his final battle and death, in Macbeth.
- Eastcheap in London, England, is the location of a tavern frequented by Falstaff, Hal and their companions in Henry IV part 1 and part 2. It is often labelled "The Boar's Head" after a real inn in Eastcheap, although that name is never used by Shakespeare. The context suggests that the scenes surrounding Falstaff's death in Henry V happen in the same location.
- Ely House in Holborn, London, England, is the setting of John of Gaunt's "This sceptred isle" speech, and his death, in Richard II.
- English Court. Many scenes in the English history plays are set at the English court, without the king's palace being named. The main seats of the court in Shakespeare's time (Greenwich, Hampton Court and Whitehall) had not been built at the time of the Wars of the Roses, so in most cases the court, historically, would have met at the Tower of London, although Richmond was favoured by Richard II. Windsor was a day's journey from London, and several events dramatized by Shakespeare happened at Westminster. (Note: Scenes which are not otherwise listed on this page, because they happen at the English court without Shakespeare's text specifying its location, include: King John: Act 1 scene 1, act 4 scene 2 and act 5 scene 1; Richard II: Act 1 scenes 1 (Note: Historically the events depicted in the opening scene of Richard II happened on 29 April 1398 at Windsor Castle, where Mowbray was being held.) & 4, act 2 scene 2, act 4 scene 1, (Note: Historically, the main events of the "deposition scene" of Richard II happened on 30 September 1399 at Westminster Hall. Richard's appearance in the scene is unhistorical. Other events dramatized in the same scene actually occurred at subsequent meetings of parliament in October of that year.) and act 5 scenes 3, 4 & 6; Henry IV Part 1: Act 1 scene 1, act 1 scene 3, and act 3 scene 2; Henry V: Act 1 scenes 1 & 2; Henry VI Part 1: Act 1 scene 1, (Note: Historically, the funeral of Henry V, which forms part of the action of the opening scene of Henry VI, Part 1, happened at Westminster Abbey, although the events recounted in the scene actually happened over a number of years.) act 3 scene 1, (Note: Historically, according to Shakespeare's source Hall, the parliament dramatized in act 3 scene 1 of Henry VI, Part 1 did not happen in London at all, but at Leicester.) and act 5 scenes 1 & 7; (Note: The peace negotiations and proposals for Henry's marriage to the daughter of the Earl of Armangac, and later to Margaret, happened historically at Arras and Tours (both in France) some nine years apart.) Henry VI Part 2: Act 1 scenes 1 (Note: Theobald simply placed the opening scene of Henry VI, Part 2 at the King's palace, London.) & 3, and act 4 scene 4; Henry VI Part 3: Act 1 scene 1, (Note: The opening scene of Henry VI, Part 3 is set at the English Parliament which met at Westminster Palace. The events represented in it telescope a period of some five and a half years of historical time, from May 1455 to October 1460.) act 3 scene 2, (Note: According to Shakespeare's source (Hall) Edward and Elizabeth met at Grafton Manor.) act 4, scenes 1, 5, (Note: Queen Elizabeth took sanctuary at Westminster Abbey, although the text does not refer to it.) 9 & 10, (Note: In history, the "palace" referred to at 4.10.1 is that of the Bishop of London.) (Note: In this case the scene numbers are taken from the Oxford Complete Works 2nd Edition (which is the source for all references to Shakespeare's works on this page). In Cox & Rasmussen 2001, act 4 scene 5 is scene 4, and scenes 9 & 10 are one scene numbered 8.) and act 5 scene 7; Richard III: Act 1 scenes 1 & 3, act 2 scenes 1, 2 & 4, act 4 scenes 2, 3 & 4; Henry VIII: Act 1 scenes 1, (Note: The Field of the Cloth of Gold (which took place between Ardres and Guisnes in France) is described in detail in the opening scene of Henry VIII but is not itself a setting of it.) 2 & 3, act 2 scenes 2 & 3, act 3 scene 2, and act 5 scenes 1, 2, 3 and 4. (Note: The events of the closing scene of Henry VIII, which dramatizes the christening of Elizabeth I, probably happened historically at Greenwich Palace or, more specifically, at Grey Friar Church at Greenwich. Even so most editors follow Theobald in setting the scene at the court.))
- Flint Castle in Wales is the setting of Richard's surrender to Bolingbroke in Richard II.
- The Forest of Arden is the setting of the whole play As You Like It, other than the court scenes and those set at Oliver's house. Since the play is set in France it may represent the Ardennes Forest, or equally for its original audiences, the Forest of Arden in Warwickshire, England, Shakespeare's home county.
- French Court: Similarly to the English court, Shakespeare sometimes places scenes in the French court, without giving its location. (Note: Scenes which are not otherwise listed on this page, because they happen at the French court without Shakespeare's text specifying its location, include: Henry V: Act 2 scene 4, act 3 scenes 4 & 5; (Note: Act 3 scene 4 is unhistorical. Act 3 scene 5 contains the line "Prince Dauphin, you shall stay with us in Rouen" which is also the location of the scene according to Holinshed.) and act 5 scene 2; (Note: Historically, the peace was settled at Troyes in France, around five years after the Battle of Agincourt.) Henry VI Part 3: Act 3 scene 3.)
- Gad's Hill, now part of Higham, near Rochester, in Kent, England, is the setting of a robbery committed by Falstaff and his followers, and then of another robbery committed upon them by Poins and Hal, in Henry IV, Part 1.
- The Garter Inn is the lodging of Sir John Falstaff, and as such the setting of many scenes in The Merry Wives of Windsor.
- Gaultree Forest, England, is the setting of an episode separate from the main plot of Henry IV, Part 2 which takes up much of its fourth act.
- Gloucestershire:
  - Gloucestershire, a county in England, on the route to Berkeley Castle, is the setting of a scene between Bolingbroke and his supporters in Richard II.
  - Gloucestershire, a county in England, without any specific town or city being specified, is the home of Justice Shallow and the setting of several rural scenes in Henry IV, Part 2.
- For Harlech Castle see "Wales" under nations, cities and towns above.
- Herne's Oak, a tree in Windsor Park, is the meeting place for the final humiliation of Falstaff, and the setting of the climax of The Merry Wives of Windsor.
- Ilium, the royal palace of Troy in present-day Turkey, is the setting of most scenes set within Troy's walls in Troilus and Cressida: Ilium, Ilion or Ilyion are also alternative names for the city of Troy, named after its founder Ilus.
- For Jerusalem Chamber see "Westminster Palace" below.
- Kenilworth Castle in England is where Henry learns of the defeat of Cade, and then of the threat from York, in Henry VI, Part 2.
- Kimbolton Castle in England is the home of the divorced queen Katherine in Henry VIII.
- For Kent see "London and Kent" under "London" above.
- Pomfret Castle:
  - Pomfret Castle (i.e. Pontefract Castle in England) is the setting of the killing of King Richard by Piers of Exton in Richard II.
  - Pomfret Castle (i.e. Pontefract Castle in England) is the setting of the execution of Rivers, Grey and Vaughan in Richard III.
- Pompey:
  - Pompey's Court is a setting in Antony and Cleopatra. Its location (historically on Sicily in present-day Italy) is not specified in the text.
  - Pompey's Galley is the setting of the central "What manner o'thing is your crocodile?" scene of Antony and Cleopatra. The prior scene on land (act 2 scene 6) is not given a location in the text. In Shakespeare's sources it occurs "by the mount of Misena", which is in the vicinity of Naples in modern-day Italy.
- For Richmond Palace see "English Court".
- The Sagittary is an inn or house in Venice - so-called because its sign would have depicted a centaur - to which Othello and Desdemona have eloped at the beginning of Othello, and outside which Othello is tracked-down by Cassio and his followers and then by Brabantio and his followers.
- Southwark in London, England, is one of the locations of Jack Cade's rebellion in Henry VI, Part 2. See also "London and Kent" under "London" above.
- Swinstead Abbey is an abbey in Lincolnshire, England, whose orchard is the setting of the death agonies of King John, supported by his Barons, in King John. In history, it is Swineshead Abbey that King John visited, and the confusion of Swinstead and Swineshead was common in the late-sixteenth century. Historically, the king died not there, but at the Bishop of Lincoln's Castle, Newark.
- The Temple Garden in London, England, is the setting of the debate between York and Somerset in Henry VI, Part 1, in which the nobles each pluck a white or red rose, establishing their factions for the Wars of the Roses.
- Tower of London:
  - See also "English Court".
  - See also "Road" under less-specific settings, above.
  - The Tower of London is the setting of the conflict between Gloucester's men in blue coats, and Winchester's men in tawny coats, in Henry VI, Part 1.
  - The Tower of London is the setting of a short scene in which Lord Scales promises to send Matthew Gough to fight Jack Cade, in Henry VI, Part 2.
  - The Tower of London is the setting of two scenes in Henry VI, Part 3. In the first, Henry is freed from captivity to join his new allies, Warwick and Clarence. In the other, the recaptured Henry is murdered in his cell by Richard.
  - The Tower of London is the setting of several scenes in Richard III including:
    - A scene in which Clarence recounts his feverish dream, and then is murdered.
    - The setting of the divided councils at which Hastings is condemned to death, and its aftermath.
    - An external scene in which Elizabeth and the other women are refused access to the princes in the Tower.
- For Westminster Abbey see "Westminster Palace", and, under less-specific settings above, "Road".
- Westminster Palace in London, England, is the location of the court scenes of Henry IV, Part 2, including the final confrontation and reconciliation of Henry and Hal, and the king's death. Inconsistently, the Jerusalem Chamber (where the king collapses and later dies) is in fact in Westminster Abbey.
- For Whitehall see "York Place".
- For Windsor Castle see "English Court".
- For Windsor Park see "Herne's Oak".
- York Place in London, England, is renamed Whitehall during the course of the action of Henry VIII ("Sir, you must no more call it York Place ... 'tis now the King's, and called Whitehall."). According to Shakespeare and Fletcher's source Holinshead, York Place was the venue of the feast dramatized in the first act, at which, unhistorically, the king first meets Anne Bullen.

== Wars and battles ==
This table is a chronological list of the historical wars and battles partially dramatized by Shakespeare in the 38 plays covered by this page.

‡ Italics in the "Battle or Siege" column indicate a battle not explicitly dramatized by name, with an explanation of the reason for its inclusion in the footnotes.

The battles in All's Well That Ends Well, (Note: In All's Well That Ends Well, Shakespeare's source was Boccaccio's Decameron which draws on the general antagonism between Siena and Florence around the time of the Italian Wars.) Cymbeline, (Note: In the case of Cymbeline, Shakespeare drew on episodes recounted in Holinshed's Chronicles and Geoffrey of Monmouth's The History of the Kings of Britain.) King Lear, (Note: The story of King Lear is set in prehistoric Britain and derives from folk tales. The closest to an historical source is the recounting of the tale in Geoffrey of Monmouth's The History of the Kings of Britain.) Titus Andronicus (Note: Titus Andronicus is not historical, and is not set in any specific era of Roman history. The Goths in its story represent, in Jonathan Bate's words, "all the enemies of Rome".) and The Two Noble Kinsmen (Note: The battle in the opening act of The Two Noble Kinsmen, in which Theseus defeats Creon, primarily derives from Geoffrey Chaucer's The Knight's Tale, although the story has several predecessors in Ancient Greek drama: most closely resembling Euripides' The Suppliants.) appear to have no basis in any real indentifiable historical conflicts, and accordingly are not listed in the table.

Also not included are popular rebellions: specifically, Jack Cade's Rebellion of 1450 is dramatized by Shakespeare (Note: As always on this page, "Shakespeare" is a shorthand for "the author(s) of the play(s)", some of them being collaborative. In this case John Dover Wilson believed he had detected the hand of Thomas Nashe in the Jack Cade scenes of Henry VI, Part 2.) in act 4 of Henry VI, Part 2. Its presentation includes events drawn from the chronicles of the rebellions of Jack Straw and Wat Tyler also.

Wider Conflict	Battle or Siege	Play	Scene (Note: In the table, act and scene divisions are taken from "The Oxford Shakespeare: The Complete Works" Second Edition (i.e. Jowett, Montgomery, Taylor & Wells 2005). These do not always accord with the division of acts and scenes in the other sources used on this page.)
The Trojan War	Siege of Troy; 12th or 13th Century BCE	Troilus and Cressida	The whole play
Roman–Volscian Wars	Siege of Corioli; 493 BCE	Coriolanus	Act 1 - scenes 4 to 11
Roman–Volscian Wars	Volsican invasion of Rome; 491-488 BCE	Coriolanus	Act 4 -scenes 6 & 7 Act 5 scenes 1 to 5
Liberators' Civil War	Battle of Philippi; 42 BCE	Julius Caesar	Act 5 - the whole act
Antony's Parthian War	‡ Battle of Mount Gindarus (Note: Historically, Pacorus was killed by Ventidius's forces at the Battle of Mount Gindarus, also known as the Battle of Cyrrhestica. Shakespeare dramatizes the triumph following this event, but does not refer to its setting, nor to the battle by name.); 38 BCE	Antony and Cleopatra	Act 3 - scene 1
Last War of the Roman Republic	Battle of Actium; September 31 BCE	Antony and Cleopatra	Act 3 - scenes 7 to 10 (Note: The scenes set in Actium, depicting the Battle of Actium, which was a sea battle, take place entirely on shore: showing the preparation, the battle as witnessed by spectators, and its aftermath.)
Last War of the Roman Republic	Battle of Alexandria; 1-30 July 30 BCE	Antony and Cleopatra	Act 3 - scenes 12 to 13; Act 4 - the whole act Act 5 - the whole act
Rebellions against Macbeth	Battle of Dunsinane; 27 July 1054; & ‡ Battle of Lumphanan; 15 August 1057 (Note: Although mostly fictional, the battle dramatized at the end of Macbeth reflects the events of two real conflicts: Dunsinane, at which Siward defeated Macbeth's forces and purported to appoint Malcolm (who later became Malcolm III of Scotland) as a puppet king; and the later battle at Lumphanan at which Macbeth died.)	Macbeth	Act 5 scenes 2 to 11
First Hundred Years' War (Note: In King John, Shakespeare depicts the events leading up to the Treaty of Le Goulet and the sporadic wars between the Angevin Empire and the Kingdom of France in the early years of the 13th century as if it were one campaign centred on the town of Angiers (i.e. Angers in present-day France).)	‡ Siege of Mirabeau (Note: Much of King John is based on dramatic rather than historical sources (see sources of King John) but its scenes set at Angiers are based in part on the chronicle history of the 1202 siege of Mirabeau); 1202	King John	Act 2 - the whole act Act 3 - the whole act
First Hundred Years' War	‡ First Barons' War (Note: Shakespeare depicts Louis the Dauphin of France's intervention in the First Barons' War as events occurring around St Edmundsbury (i.e. Bury St Edmunds in England).); 1216	King John	Act 5 - scenes 2 to 5
Rebellions against Henry IV	Battle of Shrewsbury; 21 July 1403	Henry IV, Part 1	Act 4 - scenes 1 and 3 Act 5 - the whole act
Rebellions against Henry IV	‡ Gualtree Forest (Note: The Gaultee Forest episode of Henry IV, Part 2 telescopes the events of the 1405 Northern Rising and the 1408 Battle of Bramham Moor.); 1405-1408	Henry IV, Part 2	Act 4 - scenes 1 & 2
Hundred Years' War	Siege of Harfleur; 18 August - 22 September 1415	Henry V	Act 3 - scenes 1 to 3
Hundred Years' War	Battle of Agincourt; 25 October 1415	Henry V	Act 3 - scene 7 Act 4 - the whole act
Hundred Years' War	Siege of Orléans (Note: Joan's attack on the English forces at Orleans happened in April and May of 1429. The encounter between her and Talbot is unhistorical, as is the English recapture of the city.); 12 October 1428 – 8 May 1429	Henry VI, Part 1	Act 1 - scenes 2 to 3 and 5 to 8 Act 2 - scenes 1 to 2
Hundred Years' War	‡ Rouen (Note: The events set at Rouen in Henry VI, Part 1 are almost entirely unhistorical. Rouen itself remained in English hands until 1449, long after the death of Joan in 1431. The scene may have been partly influenced by a story in Robert Fabyan's 1516 The New Chronicles of England and France of the taking of the minor Castle of Cornill.)	Henry VI, Part 1	Act 3 - scenes 2 to 6
Hundred Years' War	‡ Siege of Bordeaux (Note: The battle scenes which Shakespeare appears to place at Bordeaux, containing the deaths of the Talbots, father and son, actually, according to his sources Holinshed and Hall, happened at Castillon, in the Dordogne. The siege of Bordeaux occurred in 1451 and the Talbots' deaths in 1453: both events long after the death of Joan in 1431.); August - October 1453	Henry VI, Part 1	Act 4 - scenes 2 and 5 to 7
Wars of the Roses	First Battle of St Albans; 22 May 1455	Henry VI, Part 2	Act 5 - scenes 2 to 5
Wars of the Roses	Battle of Wakefield; 30 December 1460	Henry VI, Part 3	Act 1 - scenes 3 and 4 (Note: Act 1 scenes 3 and 4 of Henry VI, Part 3 depict the 1460 Battle of Wakefield)
Wars of the Roses	‡ Battle of Mortimer's Cross; 2 February 1461	Henry VI, Part 3	Act 2 - scene 1
Wars of the Roses	‡ Battle of Towton (Note: Act 2 scenes 3 to 6 of Henry VI, Part 3 dramatize the 1461 Battle of Towton, although the location is not mentioned in the text.); 28-29 March 1461	Henry VI, Part 3	Act 2 - scenes 3 to 6
Wars of the Roses	Battle of Barnet; 14 April 1471	Henry VI, Part 3	Act 5 - scene 2
Wars of the Roses	Battle of Tewkesbury; 4 May 1471	Henry VI, Part 3	Act 5 - scenes 3 to 5
Wars of the Roses	Battle of Bosworth Field; 22 August 1485	Richard III	Act 5 - scenes 2 to 8
Fourth Ottoman–Venetian War	‡ Ottoman invasion of Cyprus (Note: Shakespeare's Othello has parallels with the 1570 Turkish invasion of Cyprus. In those historical events, however, Cyprus was taken by the Turks, who still held it when the play was written, which is the opposite of the action of the play, in which the Turkish fleet is disbursed and Cyprus is retained.); 1570	Othello	Act 1 - scene 3 Act 2 - scenes 1 to 2

== Settings by scene ==
"Too precise effort on the part of editors to indicate locations misrepresents the practices of Elizabethan stagecraft, which allowed the spoken language to establish place whenever an exact sense is required."

— David Scott Kastan

This table lists each scene in the 38 plays covered by this article, and gives its location. Unlike the section "More-specific settings" above, the "specific setting" column does include the homes of particular characters, and generic non-geographical settings such as "market-place". Where the location is not specified in Shakespeare's text, the table will say "Not specified" but, where relevant, its footnote will mention the settings suggested by scholars or by Shakespeare's sources.

Although locations were, until recently, routinely provided for each scene by Shakespeare's editors, reflecting the pictorial and realistic sets of 18th to 20th century theatre practice, performances in Shakespeare's own time happened on bare, non-localized stages. For examples, the early texts of neither Henry IV, Part 1 nor As You Like It contain any indications of their scenes' locations in their stage directions. Michael Hattaway says "1 Henry VI was written for and, in my opinion, demands to be acted upon a stage which makes no attempt to create scenic illusion."

As Stanley Wells explains modern editorial practice, with specific reference to King Lear:

The practice, going back to Rowe (1709) of heading each scene with a statement of its supposed location - 'A room in the Duke of Albany's Palace' or 'A Chamber in a Farmhouse adjoining the Castle' to quote from Muir's edition (Note: This refers to Kenneth Muir's Arden second series edition of the play.) - has slowly been abandoned... Some editors, however, continue the practice in their notes... It seems reasonable to do so when a location for the action is clearly implied, and provided it is understood that this need not be, and in Shakespeare's theatre would not have been, realistically represented.

Plays on early modern public stages were not divided into acts and scenes, although they were at the private theatre at Blackfriars. In the public theatres between 1592 and 1607, continuous flow, rather than act intervals, was the performance practice. All act and scene divisions in the table are taken from The Oxford Shakespeare - The Complete Works (second edition) but these are not consistent across all modern editions of Shakespeare's plays. (Note: The footnotes to the table do not cover differences in the treatment of act and scene divisions generally, but usually do mention those cases where the act and scene divisions are different between the Oxford Complete Works and another edition used to source information about the play in the table.)

Play	Act	Scene	Present- day Nation	Nation, City or Town	Specific Setting
All's Well That Ends Well	I	1	France	Roussillon	The Count of Roussillon's palace
All's Well That Ends Well	I	2	France	Paris	The King's palace
All's Well That Ends Well	I	3	France	Roussillon	The Count of Roussillon's palace
All's Well That Ends Well	II	1	France	Paris	The King's palace
All's Well That Ends Well	II	2	France	Roussillon	The Count of Roussillon's palace
All's Well That Ends Well	II	3	France	Paris	The King's palace
All's Well That Ends Well	II	4	France	Paris	The King's palace
All's Well That Ends Well	II	5	France	Paris	The King's palace
All's Well That Ends Well	III	1	Italy	Florence	The Duke of Florence's palace
All's Well That Ends Well	III	2	France	Roussillon	The Count of Roussillon's palace
All's Well That Ends Well	III	3	Italy	Florence	The Duke of Florence's palace
All's Well That Ends Well	III	4	France	Roussillon	The Count of Roussillon's palace
All's Well That Ends Well	III	5	Italy	Florence	Outside Florence
All's Well That Ends Well	III	6	Italy	Florence	The Florentine camp
All's Well That Ends Well	III	7	Italy	Florence	The Widow's home
All's Well That Ends Well	IV	1	Italy	Florence	Outside the Florentine camp
All's Well That Ends Well	IV	2	Italy	Florence	The Widow's home
All's Well That Ends Well	IV	3	Italy	Florence	The Florentine camp
All's Well That Ends Well	IV	4	Italy	Florence	The Widow's home
All's Well That Ends Well	IV	5	France	Roussillon	The Count of Roussillon's palace
All's Well That Ends Well	V	1	France	Marseilles	Not specified
All's Well That Ends Well	V	2	France	Roussillon	The Count of Roussillon's palace
All's Well That Ends Well	V	3	France	Roussillon	The Count of Roussillon's palace
All's Well That Ends Well	Epilogue		None	None	None
Antony and Cleopatra	I	1	Egypt	Alexandria	Cleopatra's court
Antony and Cleopatra	I	2	Egypt	Alexandria	Cleopatra's court
Antony and Cleopatra	I	3	Egypt	Alexandria	Cleopatra's court
Antony and Cleopatra	I	4	Italy	Rome	Caesar's court
Antony and Cleopatra	I	5	Egypt	Alexandria	Cleopatra's court
Antony and Cleopatra	II	1	Not specified (Note: Although Shakespeare's text does not specify it, historically Pompey's court was located on Sicily in present-day Italy.)		Pompey's court
Antony and Cleopatra	II	2	Italy	Rome	Caesar's court
Antony and Cleopatra	II	3	Italy	Rome	Caesar's court
Antony and Cleopatra	II	4	Italy	Rome	Caesar's court
Antony and Cleopatra	II	5	Egypt	Alexandria	Cleopatra's court
Antony and Cleopatra	II	6	Not specified (Note: Although the location is not specified by Shakespeare, according to Shakespeare's source (North's translation of Plutarch's Lives) Pompey's Galley was moored near the Mount of Misena, in modern-day Italy.)		By Pompey's galley
Antony and Cleopatra	II	7	Not specified		Aboard Pompey's galley
Antony and Cleopatra	III	1	Syria, Iran or Iraq	Parthia (Note: This scene occurs at Parthia's border with the Roman Empire. The sources cited suggest several modern nations that might be the location of it.)	The battlefield
Antony and Cleopatra	III	2	Italy	Rome	Caesar's court
Antony and Cleopatra	III	3	Egypt	Alexandria	Cleopatra's court
Antony and Cleopatra	III	4	Greece	Athens	
Antony and Cleopatra	III	5	Egypt	Alexandria	Cleopatra's court
Antony and Cleopatra	III	6	Italy	Rome	Caesar's court
Antony and Cleopatra	III	7	Greece	Actium	On shore
Antony and Cleopatra	III	8	Greece	Actium	On shore
Antony and Cleopatra	III	9	Greece	Actium	On shore
Antony and Cleopatra	III	10	Greece	Actium	On shore
Antony and Cleopatra	III	11	Not specified (Note: Plutarch, Shakespeare's source, located the events dramatized in this scene at Taenarum, in Greece.)		
Antony and Cleopatra	III	12	Egypt	Alexandria	Caesar's camp
Antony and Cleopatra	III	13	Egypt	Alexandria	Cleopatra's court
Antony and Cleopatra	IV	1	Egypt	Alexandria	Caesar's camp
Antony and Cleopatra	IV	2	Egypt	Alexandria	Cleopatra's court
Antony and Cleopatra	IV	3	Egypt	Alexandria	A camp
Antony and Cleopatra	IV	4	Egypt	Alexandria	Cleopatra's court
Antony and Cleopatra	IV	5	Egypt	Alexandria	Cleopatra's court
Antony and Cleopatra	IV	6	Egypt	Alexandria	Caesar's camp
Antony and Cleopatra	IV	7 (Note: Act 4 scene 7 is the only scene treated differently in the Oxford Complete Works (which is the source for act and scene numbers in this table) and John Wilders' Arden edition of Antony and Cleopatra (which is the main source for most other information about the play on this page). In Oxford this is a short separate scene of only three lines long: in Wilders those are the opening lines of the following scene. Accordingly, scenes 7 and 8 in Oxford are scene 7 in Wilders, and scenes 9 to 16 in Oxford, and in this table, are scenes 8 to 15 in Wilders.)	Egypt	Alexandria	The battlefield
Antony and Cleopatra	IV	8	Egypt	Alexandria	The battlefield
Antony and Cleopatra	IV	9	Egypt	Alexandria	Cleopatra's court
Antony and Cleopatra	IV	10	Egypt	Alexandria	Caesar's camp
Antony and Cleopatra	IV	11	Egypt	Alexandria	The battlefield
Antony and Cleopatra	IV	12	Egypt	Alexandria	The battlefield
Antony and Cleopatra	IV	13	Egypt	Alexandria	Not specified (Note: John Wilders observes that the scene appears to begin on a hill where Antony can witness the sea battle, but to continue inside Alexandria, where Cleopatra joins him.)
Antony and Cleopatra	IV	14	Egypt	Alexandria	Cleopatra's court
Antony and Cleopatra	IV	15	Egypt	Alexandria	The battlefield
Antony and Cleopatra	IV	16	Egypt	Alexandria	Cleopatra's monument
Antony and Cleopatra	V	1	Egypt	Alexandria	Caesar's camp
Antony and Cleopatra	V	2	Egypt	Alexandria	Cleopatra's monument
As You Like It	I	1	France	France	Oliver's orchard
As You Like It	I	2	France	France	Duke Frederick's court
As You Like It	I	3	France	France	Duke Frederick's court
As You Like It	II	1	France	France	The Forest of Arden
As You Like It	II	2	France	France	Duke Frederick's court
As You Like It	II	3	France	France	Oliver's home
As You Like It	II	4	France	France	The Forest of Arden
As You Like It	II	5	France	France	The Forest of Arden
As You Like It	II	6	France	France	The Forest of Arden
As You Like It	II	7	France	France	The Forest of Arden
As You Like It	III	1	France	France	Duke Frederick's court
As You Like It	III	2	France	France	The Forest of Arden
As You Like It	III	3	France	France	The Forest of Arden
As You Like It	III	4	France	France	The Forest of Arden
As You Like It	III	5	France	France	The Forest of Arden
As You Like It	IV	1	France	France	The Forest of Arden
As You Like It	IV	2	France	France	The Forest of Arden
As You Like It	IV	3	France	France	The Forest of Arden
As You Like It	V	1	France	France	The Forest of Arden
As You Like It	V	2	France	France	The Forest of Arden
As You Like It	V	3	France	France	The Forest of Arden
As You Like It	V	4	France	France	The Forest of Arden
As You Like It	Epilogue		France	France	None
The Comedy of Errors	I	1	Turkey	Ephesus	Not specified (Note: Theobald envisaged the opening scene of The Comedy of Errors taking place in a formal chamber of the Duke's palace. Capell imagined it being in a public place.)
The Comedy of Errors	I	2	Turkey	Ephesus	Mart
The Comedy of Errors	II	1	Turkey	Ephesus	Antipholus of Ephesus' home (The Phoenix)
The Comedy of Errors	II	2	Turkey	Ephesus	Not specified (Note: Dyce located this scene at the Mart.)
The Comedy of Errors	III	1	Turkey	Ephesus	Antipholus of Ephesus' home (The Phoenix)
The Comedy of Errors	III	2	Turkey	Ephesus	Antipholus of Ephesus' home (The Phoenix)
The Comedy of Errors	IV	1	Turkey	Ephesus	Mart
The Comedy of Errors	IV	2	Turkey	Ephesus	Antipholus of Ephesus' home (The Phoenix)
The Comedy of Errors	IV	3	Turkey	Ephesus	Not specified (Note: The Arden edition of The Comedy of Errors places these two scenes "presumably" at the mart.)
The Comedy of Errors	IV	4	Turkey	Ephesus	Not specified
The Comedy of Errors	V	1	Turkey	Ephesus	Mart
Coriolanus	I	1	Italy	Rome	Not specified (Note: Pope placed the opening scene of Coriolanus on "a street in Rome", and it must be an outdoor public place.)
Coriolanus	I	2	Italy	Corioli	Not specified
Coriolanus	I	3	Italy	Rome	Coriolanus' (Note: For consistency, this table calls the title character "Coriolanus" even in the early scenes before he attains that title) home
Coriolanus	I	4	Italy	Corioli	Outside Corioli
Coriolanus	I	5 (Note: In the Oxford Complete Works (which is the source for act and scene numbers in this table) scenes 4 and 5 are separate scenes. In Peter Holland's 3rd series Arden edition (which is the source for most other information about Coriolanus on this page) they are one scene. Accordingly scenes 6 to 11 in Oxford (and in this table) are scenes 5 to 10 in Arden.)	Italy	Corioli	Outside Corioli
Coriolanus	I	6	Italy	Corioli	Not specified (Note: Some editors including Capell place this scene inside Corioli, although it could equally be outside the walls.)
Coriolanus	I	7	Italy	Corioli	Outside Corioli
Coriolanus	I	8	Italy	Corioli	Outside Corioli
Coriolanus	I	9	Italy	Corioli	Outside Corioli
Coriolanus	I	10	Italy	Corioli	Outside Corioli
Coriolanus	I	11	Italy	Corioli	Outside Corioli (Note: Pope set this scene at the Volscian camp, but it only needs to be somewhere outside the city.)
Coriolanus	II	1	Italy	Rome	Not specified (Note: Capell described the setting as "a public place".)
Coriolanus	II	2	Italy	Rome	The Capitol (Note: Peter Holland, referring to Shakespeare's plays set in Ancient Rome, says: "Shakespeare appears to have assumed that the Capitol was the seat of the Senate but it was properly, to be pedantic, the temple of Jupiter on the Capitoline Hill while the Senate met near the Forum.")
Coriolanus	II	3	Italy	Rome	The market-place
Coriolanus	III	1	Italy	Rome	Not specified (Note: Rowe placed this scene at "A publick street in Rome")
Coriolanus	III	2	Italy	Rome	Coriolanus' home (Note: "Presumably", according to Peter Holland.)
Coriolanus	III	3	Italy	Rome	The market-place
Coriolanus	IV	1	Italy	Rome	Not specified (Note: Coriolanus' farewell to Rome has been thought to happen at the gates (Pope) or outside the walls (Rowe).)
Coriolanus	IV	2	Italy	Rome	Not specified (Note: This scene must occur in a street or other outdoor public place)
Coriolanus	IV	3	Italy	Not Specified	Not Specified
Coriolanus	IV	4	Italy	Antium	Outside Aufidius' home
Coriolanus	IV	5	Italy	Antium	Aufidius' home
Coriolanus	IV	6	Italy	Rome	Not specified (Note: This scene occurs in an outdoor public place)
Coriolanus	IV	7	Italy	Rome	Volscian camp outside Rome
Coriolanus	V	1	Italy	Rome	Not specified (Note: This scene occurs in an outdoor public place)
Coriolanus	V	2	Italy	Rome	Volscian camp outside Rome
Coriolanus	V	3	Italy	Rome	Volscian camp outside Rome (Note: Peter Holland says the scene is "effectively continuous with 5.2" although Capell's location of the scene at Coriolanus' tent has been influential upon paintings of the scene, and theatrical staging.)
Coriolanus	V	4	Italy	Rome	Not specified (Note: This scene occurs in an outdoor public place) (Note: The very short Scene 5 may be continuous with scene 4. Dyce was the first editor to make the procession of the ladies' returning to Rome a separate scene, and located it "near the gate".)
Coriolanus	V	5	Italy	Rome	Not specified
Coriolanus	V	6	Italy	Antium	Not specified
Cymbeline	I	1	England	Britain	Cymbeline's court (Note: The location of Cymbeline's court, other than being in Britain in the Roman era, is not otherwise specified by Shakespeare. The historical Cymbeline ruled the Catuvellauni tribe, and his seat of government was in Camulodunum which is modern-day Colchester.)
Cymbeline	I	2	England	Britain	Cymbeline's court
Cymbeline	I	3	England	Britain	Cymbeline's court
Cymbeline	I	4	Italy	Rome	Philario's home
Cymbeline	I	5	England	Britain	Cymbeline's court
Cymbeline	I	6	England	Britain	Cymbeline's court
Cymbeline	II	1	England	Britain	Cymbeline's court
Cymbeline	II	2	England	Britain	Cymbeline's court - Innogen's bedchamber
Cymbeline	II	3	England	Britain	Cymbeline's court - outside Innogen's bedchamber
Cymbeline	II	4	Italy	Rome	Philario's home
Cymbeline	II	5	Italy	Rome	Philario's home
Cymbeline	III	1	England	Britain	Cymbeline's court
Cymbeline	III	2	England	Britain	Cymbeline's court
Cymbeline	III	3	Wales	Milford Haven (Note: All scenes in Wales in Cymbeline appear to be in the vicinity of Milford Haven, although there is no scene set specifically in the town.)	Belarius' cave
Cymbeline	III	4	Wales	Milford Haven	Not specified (Note: This is an external scene, so set somewhere in the countryside.)
Cymbeline	III	5	England	Britain	Cymbeline's court
Cymbeline	III	6	Wales	Milford Haven	Belarius' cave
Cymbeline	III	7	Italy	Rome	Not specified (Note: A public place in Rome. Valerie Wayne argues that this is the only scene of Cymbeline set in ancient Rome: the other Roman scenes in the play being set, anachronistically, in Renaissance Italy.)
Cymbeline	IV	1	Wales	Milford Haven	Near Belarius' cave
Cymbeline	IV	2	Wales	Milford Haven	Belarius' cave
Cymbeline	IV	3	England	Britain	Cymbeline's court
Cymbeline	IV	4	Wales	Milford Haven	Near Belarius' cave
Cymbeline	V	1	Wales	Milford Haven	Near the Roman camp
Cymbeline	V	2 (Note: Valerie Wayne's Arden edition of Cymbeline (which is the source of most information about the play in this article) has one scene, act 5 Scene 2, which the Oxford Complete Works (which is the source for all act and scene numbers in this table) presents as three separate scenes: act 5 scenes 2, 3 and 4. Conversely, the Arden has two scenes, act 5 scenes 3 and 4 which the Oxford presents as one: act 5 scene 5. Following those, Arden's scene 5 matches Oxford's scene 6 and is the play's final scene.)	Wales	Milford Haven	The battlefield
Cymbeline	V	3	Wales	Milford Haven	The battlefield
Cymbeline	V	4	Wales	Milford Haven	The battlefield
Cymbeline	V	5	Wales	Milford Haven	The battlefield and a jail (Note: Valerie Wayne argues that the action is continuous and that these two episodes comprise one scene. The jailer, as was common in early modern warfare, would be holding Posthumus prisoner, shackled, on the field of battle itself.)
Cymbeline	V	6	Wales	Milford Haven	Cymbeline's camp
Hamlet	I	1	Denmark	Elsinore	The battlements
Hamlet	I	2	Denmark	Elsinore	Claudius' court
Hamlet	I	3	Denmark	Elsinore	Polonius' home
Hamlet	I	4	Denmark	Elsinore	The battlements
Hamlet	I	5	Denmark	Elsinore	The battlements
Hamlet	II	1	Denmark	Elsinore	Polonius' home
Hamlet	II	2	Denmark	Elsinore	Claudius' court
Hamlet	III	1	Denmark	Elsinore	Claudius' court
Hamlet	III	2	Denmark	Elsinore	Claudius' court (Note: The play-within-a-play The Murder of Gonzago, also known as The Mousetrap, is set in Vienna in present-day Austria.)
Hamlet	III	3	Denmark	Elsinore	Claudius' court
Hamlet	III	4	Denmark	Elsinore	Gertrude's closet (Note: A "closet" (as distinct from a "chamber") signifies a private living room, not a bedroom.)
Hamlet	IV	1	Denmark	Elsinore	Gertrude's closet (Note: The action of act 4 scene 1 of Hamlet appears continuous with act 3 scene 4, and has led scholars to doubt whether they should be designated as separate scenes: although Claudius' reference to "his mother's closet" suggests that the action may no longer be set there.)
Hamlet	IV	2	Denmark	Elsinore	The palace
Hamlet	IV	3	Denmark	Elsinore	The palace
Hamlet	IV	4	Denmark	Elsinore	Outside the palace
Hamlet	IV	5	Denmark	Elsinore	The palace
Hamlet	IV	6	Denmark	Elsinore	Not specified (Note: This scene may take place at the palace or at Horatio's lodgings.)
Hamlet	IV	7	Denmark	Elsinore	The palace
Hamlet	V	1	Denmark	Elsinore	A graveyard
Hamlet	V	2	Denmark	Elsinore	The palace
Henry IV, Part 1	I	1	England	London(?) (Note: Where Shakespeare sets a scene at the English Court without specifying the location, this table places it at "London(?)" since most possible sites were in London: although the location of Richmond Palace was not in London at the time, and Windsor Castle never has been. See "English Court" under more-specific settings.)	The English court (Note: See "English Court" under more-specific settings.)
Henry IV, Part 1	I	2	England	London	Not specified (Note: Editors have placed this scene at a tavern, at the prince's home, or at the royal palace.)
Henry IV, Part 1	I	3	England	London(?)	The English court (Note: Some editors have located act 1 scene 3 of Henry IV, Part 1 at Windsor, on the evidence of 1.1.102-3: "On Wednesday next our council we will hold at Windsor.")
Henry IV, Part 1	II	1	England	Rochester	An inn yard
Henry IV, Part 1	II	2 (Note: The Oxford Complete Works (which is the source for act and scene divisions in this table) divides the Gad's Hill episode into two scenes (act 2 scenes 2 and 3) while the Arden edition (which is the source for most other information about the play) treats it as one (scene 2). Accordingly scenes 4 and 5 in Oxford, and in this table, are scenes 3 and 4 in the Arden.)	England	None	Gad's Hill (Note: Gad's Hill - a notorious spot for highway robbery at the time the play is set, is now part of Higham, in Kent, England.)
Henry IV, Part 1	II	3	England	None	Gad's Hill
Henry IV, Part 1	II	4	England	Not specified	Hotspur's home (Note: Historically, Hotspur's home was at Warkworth Castle in Northumberland, England.)
Henry IV, Part 1	II	5	England	London	A tavern in Eastcheap (Note: The Tavern scenes in Eastcheap are often said to occur at The Boar's Head, after a real tavern which used to be situated there. However that name is never used by Shakespeare.)
Henry IV, Part 1	III	1	Wales	Not specified	Not specified
Henry IV, Part 1	III	2	England	London(?)	The English court (Note: Although Shakespeare gives no location for this court scene, his source, Holinshed, places it at Westminster.)
Henry IV, Part 1	III	3	England	London	A tavern in Eastcheap
Henry IV, Part 1	IV	1	England	Shrewsbury	The rebel camp
Henry IV, Part 1	IV	2	England	Coventry	Near Coventry
Henry IV, Part 1	IV	3	England	Shrewsbury	The rebel camp
Henry IV, Part 1	IV	4	England	Not specified	Not specified (Note: There is no historical basis for the scene of a meeting between the Archbishop of York and Sir Michael, who has not been identified with any historical figure. The scene may be set at the palace of the Archbishop of York.)
Henry IV, Part 1	V	1	England	Shrewsbury (Note: The whole of act 5 is set in the vicinity of Shrewsbury, and dramatizes the Battle of Shrewsbury)	The royal camp
Henry IV, Part 1	V	2	England	Shrewsbury	The rebel camp
Henry IV, Part 1	V	3	England	Shrewsbury	The battlefield
Henry IV, Part 1	V	4	England	Shrewsbury	The battlefield
Henry IV, Part 1	V	5	England	Shrewsbury	Not specified (Note: The closing scene of Henry IV, Part 1 takes place at the battlefield or at the King's camp nearby to it)
Henry IV, Part 2	Induction		None	None	None (Note: The Induction of Henry IV Part 2 introduces "this worm-eaten hole of ragged stone" which is the Earl of Northumberland's home.)
Henry IV, Part 2	I	1	England	England	The Earl of Northumberland's home. (Note: Historically, the Earl of Northumberland's home was at Warkworth Castle.)
Henry IV, Part 2	I	2	England	London	Not specified (Note: The scene is a public street, usually thought to be in Eastcheap, where Mistress Quickly's tavern is located.)
Henry IV, Part 2	I	3	England	England	Not specified (Note: This scene among the rebels is unhistorical and is given no particular location by Shakespeare. Its location is hinted at by Holinshed as being at the palace of the Archbishop of York.)
Henry IV, Part 2	II	1	England	London	Eastcheap (Note: The scene is a public street in Eastcheap, where Mistress Quickly's tavern is located.)
Henry IV, Part 2	II	2	England	London	Not specified (Note: This scene has no location. It must be private enough for Hal and Poins to have a private conversation yet public enough to spot the approach of Bardolph. Editors have often set it at the Prince's lodgings in London.)
Henry IV, Part 2	II	3	England	England	The Earl of Northumberland's home.
Henry IV, Part 2	II	4	England	London	A tavern in Eastcheap
Henry IV, Part 2	III	1	England	London	Westminster Palace
Henry IV, Part 2	III	2	England	England	Gloucestershire (Note: No particular town or city is specified for the scenes in Gloucestershire in Henry IV, Part 2)
Henry IV, Part 2	IV	1	England	England	Gaultree Forest
Henry IV, Part 2	IV	2	England	England	Gaultree Forest
Henry IV, Part 2	IV	3	England	London	Westminster Palace (Note: Inconsistently, the Jerusalem Chamber, where the king collapses and later dies, is in fact in Westminster Abbey.)
Henry IV, Part 2	V	1	England	England	Gloucestershire
Henry IV, Part 2	V	2	England	London	Westminster Palace
Henry IV, Part 2	V	3	England	England	Gloucestershire
Henry IV, Part 2	V	4	England	London	A street near the tavern in Eastcheap
Henry IV, Part 2	V	5	England	London	A street near Westminster Abbey (Note: The final scene of Henry IV, Part 2 is unhistorical, and is set in the street where the coronation procession of Henry V passes by.)
Henry IV, Part 2	Epilogue		None	None	None
Henry V	Prologue		None	None	None
Henry V	I	1	England	London(?)	The English court
Henry V	I	2	England	London(?)	The English court
Henry V	II	Chorus	None	None	None
Henry V	II	1	England	London	Eastcheap (Note: Gary Taylor comments that act 2 scenes 1 and 3 of Henry V "are often called the Eastcheap scenes, from the location of the tavern in 1 Henry IV: in fact both seem to be unlocalized street scenes.")
Henry V	II	2	England	Southampton	Not specified
Henry V	II	3	England	London	Eastcheap
Henry V	II	4	France	Not specified	The French court (Note: See "French Court" under more-specific settings.)
Henry V	III	Chorus	None	None	None
Henry V	III	1	France	Harfleur	The Siege of Harfleur
Henry V	III	2	France	Harfleur	The Siege of Harfleur
Henry V	III	3	France	Harfleur	The Siege of Harfleur
Henry V	III	4	France	Not specified	The French court
Henry V	III	5	France	Not specified	The French court
Henry V	III	6	France	Not specified	A road (Note: Henry's army is on the march from Harfleur towards Calais. The bridge which is referred to often in this scene, but is not the setting of it, was, historically, across the river Ternoise at Blangy.)
Henry V	III	7	France	France	Agincourt (Note: Henry V dramatizes the Battle of Agincourt.) - The French camp
Henry V	IV	Chorus	None	None	None
Henry V	IV	1	France	France	Agincourt - The English camp
Henry V	IV	2	France	France	Agincourt - The French camp
Henry V	IV	3	France	France	Agincourt - The English camp
Henry V	IV	4	France	France	Agincourt - The battlefield
Henry V	IV	5	France	France	Agincourt - The battlefield
Henry V	IV	6	France	France	Agincourt - The battlefield
Henry V	IV	7	France	France	Agincourt - The battlefield
Henry V	IV	8	France	France	Agincourt - The battlefield
Henry V	V	Chorus	None	None	None
Henry V	V	1	France	France	Not specified (Note: This scene occurs in France in the aftermath of the battle at Agincourt.)
Henry V	V	2	France	France	The French court
Henry V	Epilogue		None	None	None
Henry VI, Part 1	I	1	England	London(?)	The English court
Henry VI, Part 1	I	2 (Note: The scene numbers in the Oxford Complete Works (the source for all act and scene numbers in this table) do not match closely with Edward Burns' Arden edition of Henry VI, Part 1 (the source for most other information about the play in this table). They correlate as follows (Arden in bold, Oxford and this table in plain text): Act 1: Scene 1: Scene 1 Scene 2 lines 1-21: Scene 2 Scene 2 lines 22-150: scene 3 Scene 3: Scene 4 Scene 4 lines 1-21: Scene 5 Scene 4 lines 22-110: Scene 6 Scene 5 lines 1-39: Scene 7 Scene 5 lines 40-70: Scene 8 Act 2 has no discrepancies Act 3: Scene 1: Scene 1 Scene 2 lines 1-16: Scene 2 Scene 2 lines 17-34: Scene 3 Scene 2 lines 35-39: Scene 4 Scene 2 lines 40-112: Scene 5 Scene 2 lines 113-135: Scene 6 Scene 3: Scene 7 Scene 4: Scene 8 Act 4: Scene 1: Scene 1 Scene 2: Scene 2 Scene 3 lines 1-53: Scene 3 Scene 3 lines 54-99: Scene 4 Scene 4 lines 1-55: Scene 5 Scene 4 lines 56-112: Scene 6 Scene 4 lines 113-208: Scene 7 Act 5: Scene 1: Scene 1 Scene 2 lines 1-21: Scene 2 Scene 2 lines 22-50: Scene 3 Scene 2 lines 51-65: Scene 4 Scene 2 lines 66-216: Scene 5 Scene 3: Scene 6 Scene 4: Scene 7)	France	Orleans	Outside Orleans
Henry VI, Part 1	I	3	France	Orleans	Outside Orleans
Henry VI, Part 1	I	4	England	London	The Tower of London
Henry VI, Part 1	I	5	France	Orleans (Note: In the Orleans scenes of Henry VI, Part 1 the staging envisaged by the authors seems to have been that the theatre's tiring house represents the walls of the town, with the space above representing the top of the wall and its turrets, and the main stage representing the area outside the gates, where most of the fighting occurs.)	Not specified (Note: The parts of this scene between the gunner and his boy must either be staged with a gun, or else a gun is to be imagined just offstage. The conversation between Salisbury and Talbot happens at the top of a turret.)
Henry VI, Part 1	I	6	France	Orleans	Not specified
Henry VI, Part 1	I	7	France	Orleans	Not specified
Henry VI, Part 1	I	8	France	Orleans	Not specified
Henry VI, Part 1	II	1	France	Orleans	Not specified
Henry VI, Part 1	II	2	France	Orleans	Market place
Henry VI, Part 1	II	3	France	Not specified (Note: No particular town or city in Auvergne is specified for this scene, which is wholly unhistorical)	Auvergne
Henry VI, Part 1	II	4	England	London	The Temple Garden
Henry VI, Part 1	II	5	England	Not specified	Not specified (Note: The scene between the Duke of York and his goaled uncle Edmund Mortimer is unhistorical. To an extent the "Edmund Mortimer" in this scene is a conflation of the historical persons Edmund Mortimer, 5th Earl of March, and his cousin Sir John Mortimer. (Note: Edward Burns mentions the conflation of a third historical figure, also, Mortimer who is a character in Shakespeare's Henry IV, Part 1) John died imprisoned at the Tower of London, which may be the setting imagined for this scene.)
Henry VI, Part 1	III	1	England	London(?)	The English court
Henry VI, Part 1	III	2	France	Rouen	Not specified (Note: Like the equivalent scenes set at Orleans earlier in the play, the authors appear to have in mind the tiring house representing the walls of Rouen, "above" representing the top of the city walls, and the main stage representing the area outside the city.)
Henry VI, Part 1	III	3	France	Rouen	Not specified
Henry VI, Part 1	III	4	France	Rouen	Not specified
Henry VI, Part 1	III	5	France	Rouen	Not specified
Henry VI, Part 1	III	6	France	Rouen	Not specified
Henry VI, Part 1	III	7	France	Not specified	Not specified (Note: This scene - in which Joan persuades the Duke of Burgundy to change sides - is unhistoric, and is given no location. In history, Burgundy's change of sides happened four years after Joan's death.)
Henry VI, Part 1	III	8	France	Paris	Not Specified
Henry VI, Part 1	IV	1	France	Paris	Not Specified (Note: The second of these two scenes set in Paris is not given any more specific location in the text, but contains the coronation of Henry VI, which in history happened at Notre Dame.)
Henry VI, Part 1	IV	2	France	Bordeaux	Outside Bordeaux
Henry VI, Part 1	IV	3	Not specified		Not specified (Note: The scenes dramatizing the failure of York and of Somerset to support Talbot's army, each blaming the other for it, are unhistorical and are given no particular location.)
Henry VI, Part 1	IV	4	Not specified		Not specified
Henry VI, Part 1	IV	5	France	Bordeaux	The battlefield
Henry VI, Part 1	IV	6	France	Bordeaux	The battlefield
Henry VI, Part 1	IV	7	France	Bordeaux	The battlefield
Henry VI, Part 1	V	1	England	London(?)	The English court
Henry VI, Part 1	V	2	France	Not specified (Note: Shakespeare gives no location to the scenes surrounding the capture and death of Joan, which in history happened respectively at Compiègne and at Rouen; nor to the capture of Margaret by Suffolk, which is unhistorical.)	Not specified
Henry VI, Part 1	V	3	France	Not specified	Not specified
Henry VI, Part 1	V	4	France	Not specified	Not specified
Henry VI, Part 1	V	5	France	Not specified	Not specified
Henry VI, Part 1	V	6	France	Not specified	Not specified
Henry VI, Part 1	V	7	England	London(?)	The English court
Henry VI, Part 2	I	1	England	London(?)	The English court
Henry VI, Part 2	I	2	England	England	Gloucester's home
Henry VI, Part 2	I	3	England	London(?)	The English court
Henry VI, Part 2	I	4	England	England	Not specified (Note: Neither Shakespeare's text, nor either of his sources Hall and Holinshed, give an indication of the location of this scene, although most editors since Edward Capell have placed it at Gloucester's house or its garden.)
Henry VI, Part 2	II	1	England	St Albans	Not specified (Note: This scene has no more specific setting than St Albans: but is an external scene involving hawking.)
Henry VI, Part 2	II	2	England	England	The Duke of York's home
Henry VI, Part 2	II	3	England	London	Not specified (Note: This scene has been placed in various places by editors, and there is no single setting that would be correct historically. It contains the trial of Eleanor Cobham and her confederates, which historically happened in separate places: Eleanor at St Stephen's Chapel and the others at the Guildhall. Also the second half of the scene - the conflict between Peter and Horner - occurred at Smithfield.)
Henry VI, Part 2	II	4	England	London	A street
Henry VI, Part 2	III	1	England	England (Note: Although the location is not mentioned in Shakespeare's text, the parliament dramatized in act 3 scene 1 of Henry VI, Part 2 happened at the Abbey at Bury St Edmunds, where Cardinal Beaufort's home was, also.)	The Parliament
Henry VI, Part 2	III	2	England	England	The Cardinal's home (Note: In history, Cardinal Beaufort died at Wolvesey Palace.)
Henry VI, Part 2	III	3	England	England	The Cardinal's home
Henry VI, Part 2	IV	1	England	England	The coast of Kent
Henry VI, Part 2	IV	2	England	England	Not specified (Note: Capell placed these scenes at Blackheath, in London, although some parts of the history depicted happened at Sevenoaks in Kent.)
Henry VI, Part 2	IV	3	England	England	Not specified
Henry VI, Part 2	IV	4	England	London(?)	The English court
Henry VI, Part 2	IV	5	England	London	The Tower of London
Henry VI, Part 2	IV	6	England	London	Not specified (Note: This scene can be located in Cannon Street, London, by its reference to the London Stone in its opening sentence.)
Henry VI, Part 2	IV	7 (Note: In the Oxford complete works (which is the source for act and scene numbers in this table) Henry VI, Part 2 has one scene, act 4 scene 7, where Ronald Knowles' Arden edition (the source of most other information about the play in this table) has two scenes numbered 7 and 8. Accordingly scenes 8 and 9 in the Oxford, and this table, are 9 and 10 in the Arden.)	England	London	Not specified (Note: The Oxford complete works (and therefore this table) shows this as one scene but other editions divide it into two with different locations: the first at Smithfield, the other in Southwark.)
Henry VI, Part 2	IV	8	England	Kenilworth	Kenilworth Castle
Henry VI, Part 2	IV	9	England	England	Iden's garden
Henry VI, Part 2	V	1	England	England	Not specified (Note: Act 5 scene 1 of Henry VI, Part 2 is, according to Edmond Malone, set somewhere on the route between Dartford and Blackheath. Much of the action is unhistorical or is telescoped, but it does, at least in part, represent the historical encounter between York and Henry at Blackheath in March 1452.)
Henry VI, Part 2	V	2 (Note: From the end of act 5 scene 1 of Henry VI, Part 2, the Oxford Complete Works (which is the source for act and scene numbers in this table) presents the text in a different order from Ronald Knowles' Arden edition (which is the source for most other information about the play). They align as follows, in the order of the Oxford, with the Oxford (and therefore this table) in bold text and the Arden in plain text: Scene 2: scene 2 lines 66-71 Scene 3: scene 2 lines 1-65 Scene 4: scene 2 lines 72-90 Scene 5 lines 5-38: scene 3)	England	St Albans	The battlefield (Note: The last act of Henry VI, Part 2 dramatizes the First Battle of St Albans.)
Henry VI, Part 2	V	3	England	St Albans	The battlefield
Henry VI, Part 2	V	4	England	St Albans	The battlefield
Henry VI, Part 2	V	5	England	St Albans	The battlefield
Henry VI, Part 3	I	1	England	London(?)	The English court
Henry VI, Part 3	I	2	England	England	York's castle (Note: Historically, York's castle was Sandal Castle near Wakefield in Yorkshire)
Henry VI, Part 3	I	3	England	Wakefield	The battlefield
Henry VI, Part 3	I	4	England	Wakefield	The battlefield
Henry VI, Part 3	II	1	England	England	Not specified
Henry VI, Part 3	II	2	England	York	The gates of York
Henry VI, Part 3	II	3	England	England	Not specified
Henry VI, Part 3	II	4	England	England	Not specified
Henry VI, Part 3	II	5	England	England	Not specified
Henry VI, Part 3	II	6	England	England	Not specified
Henry VI, Part 3	III	1	England	England	Near Berwick (Note: Act 3 scene 1 of Henry VI, Part 3 is set in the countryside of England, where Henry has come, alone, to visit his former territories from Berwick which, at the time in which the play is set, was in Scotland. The scene is unhistorical, and in history the disguised king was recognised and captured while dining at Waddington Hall in Ribblesdale.)
Henry VI, Part 3	III	2	England	London(?)	The English court
Henry VI, Part 3	III	3	France	France	The French court (Note: Act 3 scene 3 of Henry VI, Part 3 telescopes events which actually occurred in the years 1461 to 1470. No specific location for the French court is given in the text.)
Henry VI, Part 3	IV	1	England	London(?)	The English court
Henry VI, Part 3	IV	2	England	England	Not specified (Note: The location of the scene is not specified other than the stage direction indicating it is "in England" and cannot be located by reference to the historical record since it telescopes several events of 1469 to 1470.)
Henry VI, Part 3	IV	3 (Note: The Oxford Complete Works, which is the source for all act an scene numbers in this table, has two scenes - act 4 scenes 3 and 4 - which Cox and Rasmussen's Arden edition, the source for most other information about the play in this table, presents as one, numbered 3. Similarly, at the end of the same act the Oxford has two scenes, numbered 9 and 10, where the Arden has one, numbered 8. It follows that scenes 5, 6, 7 and 8 in the Oxford are numbered 4, 5, 6 and 7 in the Arden.)	England	England	Outside King Edward's tent
Henry VI, Part 3	IV	4	England	England	Outside King Edward's tent
Henry VI, Part 3	IV	5	England	London(?)	The English court
Henry VI, Part 3	IV	6	England	England	A park (Note: See "Park" under less-specific settings above.)
Henry VI, Part 3	IV	7	England	England	King Henry's parliament
Henry VI, Part 3	IV	8	England	York	The gates of York
Henry VI, Part 3	IV	9	England	London(?)	The English court
Henry VI, Part 3	IV	10	England	London(?)	The English court
Henry VI, Part 3	V	1	England	Coventry	The walls of Coventry
Henry VI, Part 3	V	2	England	Barnet	The battlefield (Note: See Battle of Barnet.)
Henry VI, Part 3	V	3	England	Tewkesbury	The battlefield (Note: See Battle of Tewkesbury.)
Henry VI, Part 3	V	4	England	Tewkesbury	The battlefield
Henry VI, Part 3	V	5	England	Tewkesbury	The battlefield
Henry VI, Part 3	V	6	England	London	Tower of London
Henry VI, Part 3	V	7	England	London(?)	The English court
Henry VIII	Prologue		None		
Henry VIII	I	1	England	London(?)	The English court
Henry VIII	I	2	England	London(?)	The English court
Henry VIII	I	3	England	London(?)	The English court
Henry VIII	I	4	England	London	Not specified (Note: Although not mentioned by name in the text, this scene is imagined as being at York Place (See "York Place" under more-specific settings above).)
Henry VIII	II	1	England	London	A street
Henry VIII	II	2	England	London(?)	The English court
Henry VIII	II	3	England	London(?)	The English court
Henry VIII	II	4	England	London	Blackfriars (Note: See "Blackfriars" under more-specific settings above.)
Henry VIII	III	1	England	London	Blackfriars
Henry VIII	III	2	England	London(?)	The English court
Henry VIII	IV	1	England	London	A street
Henry VIII	IV	2	England	Kimbolton	Kimbolton Castle
Henry VIII	V	1	England	London(?)	The English court
Henry VIII	V	2	England	London(?)	The English court
Henry VIII	V	3	England	London(?)	The English court
Henry VIII	V	4	England	London(?)	The English court
Henry VIII	Epilogue		None		
Julius Caesar	I	1	Italy	Rome	Not specified (Note: These scenes are set at public places in Rome: Daniell has scene 1 "a street" (following Theobald), scene 2 " a public place" (following Capell) and scene 3 "a street" (also following Capell).)
Julius Caesar	I	2	Italy	Rome	Not specified
Julius Caesar	I	3	Italy	Rome	Not specified
Julius Caesar	II	1	Italy	Rome	Brutus' orchard
Julius Caesar	II	2	Italy	Rome	Caesar's house
Julius Caesar	II	3	Italy	Rome	Not specified
Julius Caesar	II	4	Italy	Rome	Brutus' house
Julius Caesar	III	1	Italy	Rome	The capitol
Julius Caesar	III	2	Italy	Rome	Market place
Julius Caesar	III	3	Italy	Rome	A street
Julius Caesar	IV	1	Italy	Rome	Antony's house
Julius Caesar	IV	2 (Note: David Daniell, whose Arden edition of Julius Caesar is the source for most information about the play in this table, has two scenes, act 4 scenes 2 and 3, where the Oxford Complete Works, the source of all act and scene numbers in the table, has just one, act 4 scene 2. The division comes after 4.2.52 (following Pope) dividing the scene into a sequence outside Brutus' tent followed by a sequence inside it.)	Turkey	Sardis	Brutus' tent
Julius Caesar	V	1	Greece	Philippi	The battlefield (Note: See Battle of Philippi.)
Julius Caesar	V	2	Greece	Philippi	The battlefield
Julius Caesar	V	3	Greece	Philippi	The battlefield
Julius Caesar	V	4	Greece	Philippi	The battlefield
Julius Caesar	V	5	Greece	Philippi	The battlefield
King John	I	1	England	London(?)	The English court
King John	II	1	France	Angiers	Outside Angiers
King John	II	2 (Note: The Oxford Complete Works (which is the source for all act and scene numbers in this table) has two scenes - act 2 scene 2 and act 3 scene 1 - which Lander and Tobin's Arden edition (the source for most other information about King John in this table) presents as one scene, act 3 scene 1. The break is after line 74. These editions come back into line with one another from act 3 scene 2 onwards to the end of the play.)	France	Angiers	The French King's pavilion
King John	III	1	France	Angiers	The French King's pavilion
King John	III	2	France	Angiers	The battlefield
King John	III	3	France	Angiers	The battlefield
King John	III	4	France	Angiers	The French King's pavilion
King John	IV	1	England	England	A castle (Note: The location of this castle is not specified other than being in England. See "Castle" under less-specific settings above.)
King John	IV	2	England	London(?)	The English court
King John	IV	3	England	England	A castle
King John	V	1	England	London(?)	The English court
King John	V	2	England	St Edmundsbury	The Dauphin's camp
King John	V	3	England	St Edmundsbury	The battlefield
King John	V	4	England	St Edmundsbury	The battlefield
King John	V	5	England	St Edmundsbury	The French camp
King John	V	6	England	England	Near Swinstead Abbey (Note: Historically it was not Swinstead Abbey but Swineshead Abbey that was visited by John. See "Swinstead Abbey" under more-specific settings above.)
King John	V	7	England	England	Swinstead Abbey
King Lear (Note: In the case of King Lear, there are two versions of the play in The Oxford Shakespeare second edition. The act and scene divisions in this article are taken from "The Tragedy of King Lear: The Folio Text (1610)" at Jowett et al. (2005) pp. 1153-1184.)	I	1	England	Britain (Note: Apart from being set in Ancient Britain, until the later scenes set in the vicinity of Dover, King Lear does not give any geographical location for most of its action. Two characters whose homes are settings - the Duke of Albany and the Earl of Gloucester - are named after places, but this table does not assume their homes are in those places.)	Lear's palace
King Lear	I	2	England	Britain	Earl of Gloucester's castle
King Lear	I	3	England	Britain	Goneril and Albany's palace
King Lear	I	4	England	Britain	Goneril and Albany's palace
King Lear	I	5	England	Britain	Goneril and Albany's palace
King Lear	II	1	England	Britain	Earl of Gloucester's castle (Note: Kenneth Muir treats Edgar's speech beginning "I heard myself proclaimed..." as a separate scene numbered 3, which he sets in "a Wood".)
King Lear	II	2 (Note: One of the sources used for this table, Muir divides the scene which is Act 2 scene 2 of this table into three scenes, numbered 2, 3 and 4.)	England	Britain	Earl of Gloucester's castle
King Lear	III	1	England	Britain	A heath (Note: As Stanley Wells puts it: "The practice going back to Rowe (1709), of heading each scene with a statement of its supposed location ... has slowly been abandoned but still influences thinking about the play: it is common to speak of the heath scenes even though the precise word "heath" occurs nowhere in the text")
King Lear	III	2	England	Britain	A heath
King Lear	III	3	England	Britain	Earl of Gloucester's castle
King Lear	III	4	England	Britain	A hovel
King Lear	III	5	England	Britain	Earl of Gloucester's castle
King Lear	III	6	England	Britain	Not specified (Note: Theobald set the scene at "a chamber in a farmhouse adjoining the castle" and Capell at "a room in some of the outbuildings of the castle".)
King Lear	III	7	England	Britain	Earl of Gloucester's castle
King Lear	IV	1	England	Britain	A heath
King Lear	IV	2	England	Britain	Goneril and Albany's palace
King Lear	IV	Quarto only scene (Note: The Oxford Complete Works presents two versions of King Lear: one based on the Quarto of 1608 (at pp. 909-941) and one based on the Folio of 1623 (at pp. 1153-1184). All act and scene numbers for King Lear in this table are taken from the Folio version of the play in the Oxford Complete Works. However, there is one scene (in which Kent converses with an unnamed gentleman) which appears only in the Quarto. This scene is numbered 17 in the Oxford (which presents the Quarto version without act divisions) at page 932. In Kenneth Muir's and R A Foakes' Arden versions of the play, which are the source of most other information about the play in this table, the Quarto-only scene is act 4 scene 3: accordingly the scenes which are act 4 scenes 3 to 6 in the Oxford, and this table, are scenes 4 to 7 in the Arden editions.)	England	Dover (Note: The later scenes of King Lear are set in the vicinity of Dover, although there is no scene explicitly set in the town.)	The French camp
King Lear	IV	3	England	Dover	The French camp
King Lear	IV	4	England	Britain (Note: Apart from being set in Ancient Britain, until the later scenes set in the vicinity of Dover, King Lear does not give any geographical location for most of its action. Two characters whose homes are settings - the Duke of Albany and the Earl of Gloucester - are named after places, but this table does not assume their homes are in those places.)	Not specified (Note: Capell placed the scene at Gloucester's castle.)
King Lear	IV	5	England	Dover (Note: The later scenes of King Lear are set in the vicinity of Dover, although there is no scene explicitly set in the town.)	Country near Dover
King Lear	IV	6	England	Dover	The French camp
King Lear	V	1	England	Dover	The British camp
King Lear	V	2	England	Dover	The battlefield
King Lear	V	3	England	Dover	The British camp
Love's Labour's Lost	I	1	France	Navarre (Note: No particular place within Navarre (which straddled the present-day border between France and Spain) is mentioned in the text. In history, at the time of the events thought to have influenced the story, the court of the Kingdom of Navarre was situated at Nérac, now in southwestern France.)	Not specified (Note: The quarto and folio versions of Love's Labour's Lost give no indications of the setting of each individual scene, and neither do the scholarly editions used to source information on this page. R. W. David places the action of the whole play at "The King of Navarre's Park.")
Love's Labour's Lost	I	2	France	Navarre	Not specified
Love's Labour's Lost	II	1	France	Navarre	Not specified
Love's Labour's Lost	III	1	France	Navarre	Not specified
Love's Labour's Lost	IV	1	France	Navarre	Not specified
Love's Labour's Lost	IV	2	France	Navarre	Not specified
Love's Labour's Lost	IV	3	France	Navarre	Not specified
Love's Labour's Lost	V	1	France	Navarre	Not specified
Love's Labour's Lost	V	2	France	Navarre	Not specified
Macbeth	I	1	Scotland	Scotland	Not specified
Macbeth	I	2	Scotland	Scotland	Not specified (Note: Banquo and Macbeth are on their way to rendezvous with the king at Forres, which was the royal seat, and this led Theobald and Capell to conclude that the scene was set there. Kenneth Muir sets the scene at "a camp".)
Macbeth	I	3	Scotland	Scotland	A heath
Macbeth	I	4	Scotland	Forres	Duncan's palace
Macbeth	I	5	Scotland	Inverness	Macbeth's castle
Macbeth	I	6	Scotland	Inverness	Outside Macbeth's castle
Macbeth	I	7	Scotland	Inverness	Macbeth's castle
Macbeth	II	1	Scotland	Inverness	Macbeth's castle
Macbeth	II	2	Scotland	Inverness	Macbeth's castle
Macbeth	II	3	Scotland	Inverness	Macbeth's castle
Macbeth	II	4	Scotland	Inverness	Not specified (Note: Most editors have followed Theobald in placing the scene between Ross and the Old Man, and then Macduff, outside Macbeth's castle.)
Macbeth	III	1	Scotland	Not specified (Note: The geographical location of Macbeth's castle after his accession is not specified in the text. Kenneth Muir places it at Forres, where Duncan's seat is situated in the first act. Stage and film productions frequently place it in the same setting as his castle in the first two acts, therefore impliedly at Inverness, (Note: For examples see: † Macbeth (2010 film) † the screen versions directed by Jeremy Freeston, Michael Bogdanov and Gregory Doran, † or, for the equivalent in a broader adaptation, Joe MacBeth.) or alternatively at an imagined Dunsinane. (Note: For examples see: † Macbeth (1971 film) † Macbeth (2006 film).))	Macbeth's castle
Macbeth	III	2	Scotland	Not specified	Macbeth's castle
Macbeth	III	3	Scotland	Not specified	Near Macbeth's castle
Macbeth	III	4	Scotland	Not specified	Macbeth's castle
Macbeth	III	5	Scotland	Not specified	Not specified (Note: Muir places this scene at "the heath" where we previously met the witches.)
Macbeth	III	6	Scotland	Not specified	Not specified
Macbeth	IV	1	Scotland	Not specified	Not specified (Note: Most editors have followed Rowe in setting this scene in "a cave". Kenneth Muir sets it at "a house in Forres", following Shakespeare's source Holinshed.)
Macbeth	IV	2	Scotland	Fife	Macduff's castle
Macbeth	IV	3	England	Not specified	The English court (Note: This scene in England is usually assumed to take place at the court of Edward the Confessor)
Macbeth	V	1	Scotland	Scotland	Dunsinane - Macbeth's castle
Macbeth	V	2	Scotland	Scotland	Not specified (Note: The characters in this scene are on a march towards Birnam Wood.)
Macbeth	V	3	Scotland	Scotland	Dunsinane - Macbeth's castle
Macbeth	V	4	Scotland	Scotland	Birnam Wood
Macbeth	V	5	Scotland	Scotland	Dunsinane - Macbeth's castle
Macbeth	V	6	Scotland	Scotland	Dunsinane - outside the castle
Macbeth	V	7 (Note: All sources used on this page agree upon the act and scene divisions in Macbeth as far as the start of act 5 scene 7. From that point onwards, Brooke has just one scene, numbered 7, covering the whole action of the final battle through to the end of the play. The Oxford Complete Works (which is the source for act and scene numbers in this table) divides the same action into five scenes, numbered 7 to 11. Muir and Clark & Mason agree with one another in dividing the action into three scenes: scene 7 correlating with Oxford's 7, 8 and 9; scene 8 correlating with Oxford's 10; then scene 9 correlating with Oxford's 11. (Note: Explained further both in Brooke and Clark & Mason.))	Scotland	Scotland	Dunsinane - the battlefield (Note: Some editors place some of the action of these scenes inside the castle.)
Macbeth	V	8	Scotland	Scotland	Dunsinane - the battlefield
Macbeth	V	9	Scotland	Scotland	Dunsinane - the battlefield
Macbeth	V	10	Scotland	Scotland	Dunsinane - the battlefield
Macbeth	V	11	Scotland	Scotland	Dunsinane - the battlefield
Measure for Measure	I	1	Austria	Vienna	Not specified (Note: Most editors had placed this scene at the Duke's palace until Mary Lascelles writing in 1953 pointed out inconsistencies between that location and the dialogue of the scene)
Measure for Measure	I	2	Austria	Vienna	Not specified (Note: Rowe placed this scene in "a street". Lever has "a public place".)
Measure for Measure	I	3	Austria	Vienna	Friar's cell
Measure for Measure	I	4	Austria	Vienna	Nunnery
Measure for Measure	II	1	Austria	Vienna	Courtroom (Note: "Courtroom" is the location in Lever, although Rowe located this scene at "the Palace" and Capell placed it at "a hall in Angelo's house".)
Measure for Measure	II	2	Austria	Vienna	An ante-room to the courtroom
Measure for Measure	II	3	Austria	Vienna	Prison
Measure for Measure	II	4	Austria	Vienna	An ante-room to the courtroom
Measure for Measure	III	1 (Note: One of the sources used for this table, J W Lever's second series Arden edition, divides Act 3 into two scenes, unlike all other sources used which have just one. The break follows Isabella's exit, before Elbow enters with Pompey.)	Austria	Vienna	Prison
Measure for Measure	IV	1	Austria	Vienna	Grange (Note: A "moated grange" is the home of Mariana.)
Measure for Measure	IV	2	Austria	Vienna	Prison
Measure for Measure	IV	3	Austria	Vienna	Prison
Measure for Measure	IV	4	Austria	Vienna	Not specified (Note: Rowe placed this scene at "the Palace", and Capell at "Angelo's house".)
Measure for Measure	IV	5	Austria	Vienna	Not specified (Note: Lever places this scene at "a Friar's cell", Rowe at "fields without the town" and Arthur Quiller-Couch & J. Dover Wilson at "a consecrated fount, a league below the city")
Measure for Measure	IV	6	Austria	Vienna	Not specified
Measure for Measure	V	1	Austria	Vienna	A public place
The Merchant of Venice	I	1	Italy	Venice	Not specified (Note: Lewis Theobald placed this scene at "a street in Venice" and J. Dover Wilson "on a quay in Venice". John Drakakis notes that some directors have preferred interior settings, including a café and a cabaret.)
The Merchant of Venice	I	2	Italy	Belmont	Portia's house
The Merchant of Venice	I	3	Italy	Venice	Not specified (Note: This scene is set in a public place, sometimes outside Shylock's house.)
The Merchant of Venice	II	1	Italy	Belmont	Portia's house
The Merchant of Venice	II	2	Italy	Venice	Not specified (Note: This is another scene set in a public place, sometimes outside Shylock's house.)
The Merchant of Venice	II	3	Italy	Venice	Shylock's house (Note: Editors have disagreed as to whether this scene is set inside Shylock's house or is a continuation of the previous scene and is set outside it.)
The Merchant of Venice	II	4	Italy	Venice	Not specified (Note: Lewis Theobald and J. Dover Wilson place this scene in a street in Venice.)
The Merchant of Venice	II	5	Italy	Venice	Shylock's house (Note: This is another scene where editors have disagreed whether the scene is located inside or outside the house, and directors have set it in both ways.)
The Merchant of Venice	II	6	Italy	Venice	Not specified
The Merchant of Venice	II	7	Italy	Belmont	Portia's house
The Merchant of Venice	II	8	Italy	Venice	Not specified (Note: Edward Capell places this scene in "a street".)
The Merchant of Venice	II	9	Italy	Belmont	Portia's House
The Merchant of Venice	III	1	Italy	Venice	Not specified (Note: Lewis Theobald set this scene in "a street" and J. Dover Wilson "before Shylock's house".)
The Merchant of Venice	III	2	Italy	Belmont	Portia's house
The Merchant of Venice	III	3	Italy	Venice	Not specified (Note: Another scene which Lewis Theobald set at "a street in Venice" and J. Dover Wilson at "the street before Shylock's house".)
The Merchant of Venice	III	4	Italy	Belmont	Portia's house
The Merchant of Venice	III	5	Italy	Belmont	Portia's house
The Merchant of Venice	IV	1	Italy	Venice	Courtroom
The Merchant of Venice	IV	2	Italy	Venice	Not specified (Note: Most editors have followed Edward Capell in setting this scene in a street outside the court.)
The Merchant of Venice	V	1	Italy	Belmont	Outside Portia's house
The Merry Wives of Windsor	I	1	England	Windsor	Outside Page's house
The Merry Wives of Windsor	I	2	England	Windsor	Outside Page's house
The Merry Wives of Windsor	I	3	England	Windsor	The Garter Inn
The Merry Wives of Windsor	I	4	England	Windsor	Dr. Caius' house
The Merry Wives of Windsor	II	1	England	Windsor	Outside Page's house
The Merry Wives of Windsor	II	2	England	Windsor	The Garter Inn
The Merry Wives of Windsor	II	3	England	Windsor	A field near Windsor (Note: Although not geographically located, except that one of them must be in the direction of Frogmore, the settings of the two places at which the duelists have been appointed to fight are on opposite sides of the town from one another.)
The Merry Wives of Windsor	III	1	England	Windsor	A different field near Windsor
The Merry Wives of Windsor	III	2	England	Windsor	Not specified (Note: The characters in this scene are on their way to Ford's house.)
The Merry Wives of Windsor	III	3	England	Windsor	Ford's house
The Merry Wives of Windsor	III	4	England	Windsor	Not specified
The Merry Wives of Windsor	III	5	England	Windsor	The Garter Inn
The Merry Wives of Windsor	IV	1	England	Windsor	Not specified (Note: Giorgio Melchiori places this scene on a street, on the way to Sir Hugh Evans' schoolroom)
The Merry Wives of Windsor	IV	2	England	Windsor	Ford's house
The Merry Wives of Windsor	IV	3	England	Windsor	The Garter Inn
The Merry Wives of Windsor	IV	4	England	Windsor	Page's house
The Merry Wives of Windsor	IV	5	England	Windsor	The Garter Inn
The Merry Wives of Windsor	IV	6	England	Windsor	The Garter Inn
The Merry Wives of Windsor	V	1	England	Windsor	The Garter Inn
The Merry Wives of Windsor	V	2	England	Windsor	Not specified (Note: Melchiori suggests these scenes "presumably" depict their characters on their way to Herne's Oak.)
The Merry Wives of Windsor	V	3	England	Windsor	Not specified
The Merry Wives of Windsor	V	4	England	Windsor	Near Herne's Oak (Note: Possibly set in the "sawpit" mentioned in act 4 scene 4)
The Merry Wives of Windsor	V	5	England	Windsor	Herne's Oak
A Midsummer Night's Dream	I	1	Greece	Athens	Theseus' court (Note: Some editors and directors have presented the opening scene as a public spectacle, others as private conversations.)
A Midsummer Night's Dream	I	2	Greece	Athens	Not specified (Note: Sukanta Chaudhuri says the scene "presumably" takes place at the home of one of the mechanicals, most likely Peter Quince, which is where it was placed by Capell.)
A Midsummer Night's Dream	II	1	Greece	Athens	A forest near Athens
A Midsummer Night's Dream	II	2	Greece	Athens	A forest near Athens
A Midsummer Night's Dream	III	1	Greece	Athens	A forest near Athens
A Midsummer Night's Dream	III	2	Greece	Athens	A forest near Athens
A Midsummer Night's Dream	III	3	Greece	Athens	A forest near Athens
A Midsummer Night's Dream	IV	1	Greece	Athens	A forest near Athens
A Midsummer Night's Dream	IV	2	Greece	Athens	Not specified (Note: This may be the same setting as act 1 scene 2, therefore possibly Peter Quince's house.)
A Midsummer Night's Dream	V	1 (Note: The Oxford Complete Works, which is the source for all act and scene divisions in this table, presents the last act of A Midsummer Night's Dream as two scenes and an Epilogue, where Sukanta Chaudhuri's Arden edition, the source for most information about the play in this table, has just one scene. The scene break is after line 360 of the Arden edition, immediately before Puck's entrance with a broom, and the epilogue begins after line 412 of the Arden edition, before Puck's final speech beginning "If we shadows have offended...".)	Greece	Athens	Theseus' court
A Midsummer Night's Dream	V	2	Greece	Athens	Theseus' court
A Midsummer Night's Dream	Epilogue		Greece	Athens	Theseus' court
Much Ado About Nothing	I	1	Italy	Messina	In or near Leonato's house
Much Ado About Nothing	I	2	Italy	Messina	In or near Leonato's house
Much Ado About Nothing	I	3	Italy	Messina	In or near Leonato's house
Much Ado About Nothing	II	1	Italy	Messina	In or near Leonato's house
Much Ado About Nothing	II	2	Italy	Messina	In or near Leonato's house
Much Ado About Nothing	II	3	Italy	Messina	Leonato's orchard
Much Ado About Nothing	III	1	Italy	Messina	Leonato's orchard
Much Ado About Nothing	III	2	Italy	Messina	In or near Leonato's house
Much Ado About Nothing	III	3	Italy	Messina	A street
Much Ado About Nothing	III	4	Italy	Messina	Leonato's house
Much Ado About Nothing	III	5	Italy	Messina	Outside Leonato's house
Much Ado About Nothing	IV	1	Italy	Messina	A church
Much Ado About Nothing	IV	2	Italy	Messina	A prison
Much Ado About Nothing	V	1	Italy	Messina	Outside Leonato's house
Much Ado About Nothing	V	2	Italy	Messina	In or near Leonato's house
Much Ado About Nothing	V	3	Italy	Messina	Leonato's family monument
Much Ado About Nothing	V	4	Italy	Messina	Leonato's house
Othello	I	1	Italy	Venice	Outside Brabantio's house
Othello	I	2	Italy	Venice	Outside the Sagittary
Othello	I	3	Italy	Venice	Council chamber
Othello	II	1	Cyprus	Cyprus (Note: No particular town or city in Cyprus is specified.)	A port
Othello	II	2	Cyprus	Cyprus	Not specified
Othello	II	3	Cyprus	Cyprus	Not specified (Note: Bate & Rasmussen place this scene at "the citadel".)
Othello	III	1	Cyprus	Cyprus	Not specified (Note: Bate & Rasmussen place this scene at the "governor's residence/citadel".)
Othello	III	2	Cyprus	Cyprus	Not specified
Othello	III	3	Cyprus	Cyprus	Not specified
Othello	III	4	Cyprus	Cyprus	Not specified (Note: Bate & Rasmussen place this scene "presumably outside the citadel".)
Othello	IV	1	Cyprus	Cyprus	Not specified
Othello	IV	2	Cyprus	Cyprus	Not specified (Note: Honigmann points out that the scene appears to begin in an indoor private place, possibly Desdemona's bedroom, but to end in a public outdoor place. Bate & Rasmussen place this scene within the citadel.)
Othello	IV	3	Cyprus	Cyprus	Not specified (Note: Honigmann points out that the scene appears to begin in a public place but to end in a private place where Desdemona begins to prepare for bed.)
Othello	V	1	Cyprus	Cyprus	A street
Othello	V	2	Cyprus	Cyprus	Desdemona's bedroom
Pericles, Prince of Tyre	N/A (Note: In the Oxford Shakespeare Complete Works (2nd edition), which is the source for all act and scene numbers in the table, there are no act divisions for Pericles. This does not accord with Suzanne Gossett's Arden Shakespeare (third series) edition, which is the source for most information about Pericles on this page, and which does have act divisions. The two correlate as follows (Arden in bold, Oxford in plain text): Act 1 Chorus: Scene 1 Lines 1-42 Act 1 Scene 1: Scene 1 Lines 43-213 Act 1 Scene 2: Scene 2 Act 1 Scene 3: Scene 3 Act 1 Scene 4: Scene 4 Act 2 Chorus: Scene 5 Lines 1-40 Act 2 Scene 1: Scene 5 Lines 41-209 Act 2 Scene 2: Scene 6 Act 2 Scene 3: Scene 7 Act 2 Scene 4: Scene 8 (Not included): Scene 8a Act 2 Scene 5: Scene 9 Act 3 Chorus: Scene 10 Act 3 Scene 1: Scene 11 Act 3 Scene 2: Scene 12 Act 3 Scene 3: Scene 13 Act 3 Scene 4: Scene 14 Act 4 Chorus: Scene 15 Lines 1-52 Act 4 Scene 1: Scene 15 Lines 53-151 Act 4 Scene 2: Scene 16 Act 4 Scene 3: Scene 17 Act 4 Scene 4 (Chorus): Scene 18 Act 4 Scene 5: Scene 19 Act 5 Chorus: Scene 20 Act 5 Scene 1: Scene 21 Act 5 Scene 2 (Chorus): Scene 22 Lines 1-20 Act 5 Scene 3: Scene 22 Lines 21-107 Epilogue: Scene 22 Lines 108-125.)	1	Turkey	Antioch	Antiochus' palace (Note: Gower's chorus (comprising lines 1-42 of this scene) was placed "before the palace" by Malone to which F. D. Hoeniger added "with heads displayed above the entrance". The remainder of the scene is at Antiochus' palace, although it is not specified whether it is an internal scene (as specified by Malone) or an external scene (as preferred by Suzanne Gossett).)
Pericles, Prince of Tyre	N/A	2	Lebanon	Tyre	Pericles' palace
Pericles, Prince of Tyre	N/A	3	Lebanon	Tyre	In or near Pericles' palace
Pericles, Prince of Tyre	N/A	4	Turkey	Tarsus	Not specified (Note: Malone placed this scene at "a room in the governor's house". Many productions have preferred to set it in a public place.)
Pericles, Prince of Tyre	N/A	5	Libya	Pentapolis	Not specified (Note: The opening 40 lines are Gower's chorus, which carry the action from Tarsus and out to sea. The scene itself is a seacoast, where Pericles lands having been shipwrecked.)
Pericles, Prince of Tyre	N/A	6	Libya	Pentapolis	Simonides' court
Pericles, Prince of Tyre	N/A	7	Libya	Pentapolis	Simonides' court
Pericles, Prince of Tyre	N/A	8	Lebanon	Tyre	Not specified
Pericles, Prince of Tyre	N/A	9	Libya	Pentapolis	Simonides' court
Pericles, Prince of Tyre	N/A	10	Libya	Pentapolis	Simonides' court, then at sea (Note: This scene is Gower's chorus, and includes a dumbshow set at Pentapolis, before moving the action out to sea.)
Pericles, Prince of Tyre	N/A	11	N/A		At sea
Pericles, Prince of Tyre	N/A	12	Turkey	Ephesus	Cerimon's home
Pericles, Prince of Tyre	N/A	13	Turkey	Tarsus	Not specified
Pericles, Prince of Tyre	N/A	14	Turkey	Ephesus	Cerimon's home
Pericles, Prince of Tyre	N/A	15	Turkey	Tarsus	Not specified (Note: The first 52 lines of this scene are Gower's chorus, taking the audience to Tyre, then Ephesus, then Tarsus. It also indicates the passage of time during which Marina grows up. The precise location of the rest of the scene, at Tarsus, is not specified other than that it must be an open place near the sea. The grave referred to by Marina need not necessarily be onstage.)
Pericles, Prince of Tyre	N/A	16	Greece	Mytilene	A brothel
Pericles, Prince of Tyre	N/A	17	Turkey	Tarsus	The palace
Pericles, Prince of Tyre	N/A	18	N/A		Not specified (Note: This scene is entirely Gower's chorus. Its only locations are a dumbshow, and Marina's monument, both at Tarsus.)
Pericles, Prince of Tyre	N/A	19	Greece	Mytilene	The brothel
Pericles, Prince of Tyre	N/A	20	N/A		Not specified (Note: This scene is a chorus by Gower. The events it describes occur at Mytilene.)
Pericles, Prince of Tyre	N/A	21	Greece	Mytilene	Pericles' ship
Pericles, Prince of Tyre	N/A	22	Turkey	Ephesus	Diana's Temple (Note: The first 20 lines of this scene are a chorus, and the last 18 lines an epilogue, both spoken by Gower. The intervening scene is set at Diana's Temple at Ephesus.)
Richard II	I	1	England	London(?)	The English court
Richard II	I	2	England	London	Not specified (Note: The scene between John of Gaunt and the Duchess of Gloucester has no precedent in Shakespeare's sources. It is usually assumed to take place either at Ely House or at Gaunt's London home.)
Richard II	I	3	England	Coventry	The lists
Richard II	I	4	England	London(?)	The English court
Richard II	II	1	England	London	Ely House
Richard II	II	2	England	London(?)	The English court (Note: Historically, Queen Isabel resided at Windsor Castle after Richard's departure for Ireland.)
Richard II	II	3	England	Not specified	Gloucestershire (Note: This scene dramatizes a march through Gloucestershire, ending outside Berkeley Castle.)
Richard II	II	4	Wales	Not specified	Not specified (Note: According to Shakespeare's source Holinshed, the events dramatized in this scene happened at Conwy.)
Richard II	III	1	England	Bristol	Bristol Castle
Richard II	III	2	Wales	Wales	Near Barkloughly Castle (Note: The castle which Shakespeare calls "Barkloughly" in the text of this scene is actually Harlech Castle.)
Richard II	III	3	Wales	Flint	Flint Castle
Richard II	III	4	England	Not specified	Not specified (Note: The scene between the queen and her ladies and the gardeners is unhistorical. Edward Capell placed the scene at "The Duke of York's garden".)
Richard II	IV	1	England	London(?)	The English court
Richard II	V	1	England	London	A street near the Tower of London.
Richard II	V	2	England	England	Not specified (Note: This scene appears to be set at the home of the Duke of York. That may have been Langley or at one of his London properties.)
Richard II	V	3	England	London(?)	The English court (Note: To the extent that this scene is historical (and the role of the Duchess of York is not) it is based on Holinshed, in whose chronicle it occurred at Windsor Castle.)
Richard II	V	4	England	London(?)	The English court
Richard II	V	5	England	Pontefract	Pomfret Castle
Richard II	V	6	England	London(?)	The English court (Note: Charles Forker says that the closing scene of Richard II is "probably" set at Windsor Castle.)
Richard III	I	1	England	London(?)	Possibly the English court (Note: Editors have not agreed about the likely setting of the opening scene of Richard III. Pope set the scene at the English court, Capell in a street in London.)
Richard III	I	2	England	London	A street (Note: James Siemon cites Lewis Theobald in setting this scene in "a street". Lady Anne is travelling with the body of her late father-in-law Henry VI towards Chertsey Abbey for his intended interment.)
Richard III	I	3	England	London(?)	The English court
Richard III	I	4	England	London	The Tower of London
Richard III	II	1	England	London(?)	The English court
Richard III	II	2	England	London(?)	The English court
Richard III	II	3	England	London	Not specified (Note: Theobald set this scene at "a street near the court".)
Richard III	II	4	England	London(?)	The English court
Richard III	III	1	England	London	Not specified (Note: Capell sets this scene in "a street".)
Richard III	III	2	England	London	Outside Hastings' house
Richard III	III	3	England	Pontefract	Pomfret Castle
Richard III	III	4	England	London	The Tower of London
Richard III	III	5	England	London	Not specified (Note: Lewis Theobald set this scene on "the Tower walls")
Richard III	III	6	England	London	Not specified (Note: Capell sets this scene in "a street")
Richard III	III	7	England	London	Baynard's Castle (Note: Not to be confused with Barnard Castle)
Richard III	IV	1	England	London	Outside the Tower of London
Richard III	IV	2	England	London(?)	The English court (Note: Capell set act 4 scene 4 of Richard III "Before the palace".)
Richard III	IV	3	England	London(?)	The English court
Richard III	IV	4	England	London(?)	The English court
Richard III	IV	5	England	Not specified	Lord Stanley's house (Note: Historically, Stanley's family residence was in north-east England.)
Richard III	V	1	England	Salisbury	Not specified
Richard III	V	2	England	Bosworth	Bosworth Field (Note: The scenes at Bosworth Field include those set in the tents of the two leaders, including their dream sequence.)
Richard III	V	3 (Note: All sources used in this table are in agreement about the act and scene divisions in Richard III until Act V scene 3. From that point onwards, both Arden editions have one scene, numbered 3, where the Oxford Complete Works (the source of act and scene numbers in this table) has four, numbered 3 to 6. The Oxford scene 7 therefore correlates with the Ardens' scene 4, and the Oxford's scene 8 with the Ardens' scene 5.)	England	Bosworth	Bosworth Field
Richard III	V	4	England	Bosworth	Bosworth Field
Richard III	V	5	England	Bosworth	Bosworth Field
Richard III	V	6	England	Bosworth	Bosworth Field
Richard III	V	7	England	Bosworth	Bosworth Field
Richard III	V	8	England	Bosworth	Bosworth Field
Romeo and Juliet	Prologue-Chorus		None		
Romeo and Juliet	I	1	Italy	Verona	A street (Note: Gibbons cites Rowe.)
Romeo and Juliet	I	2	Italy	Verona	A street near Capulet's house (Note: Gibbons cites Capell.)
Romeo and Juliet	I	3	Italy	Verona	Capulet's house (Note: Gibbons cites Capell.)
Romeo and Juliet	I	4	Italy	Verona	A street near Capulet's house (Note: Gibbons cites Theobald.)
Romeo and Juliet	I	5	Italy	Verona	Capulet's house (Note: Gibbons cites Theobald.)
Romeo and Juliet	II	Chorus	None		
Romeo and Juliet	II	1 (Note: The Oxford Complete Works, which is the source for all scene divisions in this table, treats the sequence outside the orchard as the first part of the same scene which continues in the orchard, while, according to Renė Weis "most editors mark a new scene" and, of the sources used on this page, Weis and Gibbons (the third and second series Arden editions, respectively) do so. This scene break follows 2.1.42, immediately before Romeo's line "He jests at scars that never felt a wound". Accordingly, Act 2 scenes 2 to 5 in the Oxford Complete Works, and this table, are scenes 3 to 6 in the Arden editions.)	Italy	Verona	Outside Capulet's orchard, then in Capulet's orchard and at Juliet's window. (Note: All stage directions in the quarto of Romeo and Juliet indicate a "window" not a "balcony", although a balcony is traditional in performance)
Romeo and Juliet	II	2	Italy	Verona	Not specified (Note: Rowe set this scene at "a monastery", Capell at "fields near a convent", and Malone at "Friar Laurence's cell". René Weis places it "in the herb garden of an abbey in Verona".)
Romeo and Juliet	II	3	Italy	Verona	Not specified (Note: Capell placed this scene in "a street")
Romeo and Juliet	II	4	Italy	Verona	Juliet's bedroom (Note: Alternatively, Rowe set this scene at "Capulet's house" and Capell in "Capulet's garden".)
Romeo and Juliet	II	5	Italy	Verona	Friar Laurence's cell (Note: Gibbons cites Capell.)
Romeo and Juliet	III	1	Italy	Verona	A street (Note: Gibbons cites Rowe.)
Romeo and Juliet	III	2	Italy	Verona	Juliet's bedroom (Note: Alternatively, Rowe set this scene at "an apartment in Capulet's house" and Capell in "Capulet's garden".)
Romeo and Juliet	III	3	Italy	Verona	Friar Laurence's cell (Note: Gibbons cites Capell.)
Romeo and Juliet	III	4	Italy	Verona	Capulet's house (Note: Gibbons cites Capell.)
Romeo and Juliet	III	5	Italy	Verona	Juliet's bedroom (Note: Gibbons cites Theobald.)
Romeo and Juliet	IV	1	Italy	Verona	Friar Laurence's cell (Note: Gibbons cites Capell.)
Romeo and Juliet	IV	2	Italy	Verona	Capulet's house (Note: Gibbons cites Capell.)
Romeo and Juliet	IV	3	Italy	Verona	Juliet's bedroom
Romeo and Juliet	IV	4 (Note: The Oxford Complete Works, which is the source for all scene numbers in this table, has one scene - act 4 scene 4 - where both Weis' and Gibbons' Arden editions have two, numbered 4 and 5. The scene break follows 4.4.27, such that the new scene begins with the Nurse's attempt to wake Juliet.)	Italy	Verona	The Capulet household (Note: From line 28 onwards the setting is Juliet's bedroom (Note: Gibbons cites Rowe.))
Romeo and Juliet	V	1	Italy	Mantua	A street (Note: This scene in Mantua is set outside the apothecary's closed shop.)
Romeo and Juliet	V	2	Italy	Verona	Friar Laurence's cell (Note: Gibbons cites Capell.)
Romeo and Juliet	V	3	Italy	Verona	The Capulet's monument (Note: The final scene involves action which occurs both inside and outside the monument, so that (in René Weis's words) "the choreographic demands of this scene are complex")
The Taming of the Shrew	Induction (Note: Alexander Pope introduced the description of the opening scenes of The Taming of the Shrew as an "Induction".)	1	England	Not specified (Note: The references to Burton Heath and Wincot suggest a Warwickshire setting.)	Outside a tavern
The Taming of the Shrew	Induction	2	England	Not specified	The Lord's house
The Taming of the Shrew	I	1; 1-246	Italy	Padua	A public place (Note: Hodgdon cites Capell.)
The Taming of the Shrew	I	1; 247-252	England	Not specified	The Lord's house
The Taming of the Shrew	I	2	Italy	Padua	Outside Hortensio's house
The Taming of the Shrew	II	1	Italy	Padua	Baptista's house. (Note: Editors have not agreed whether act 2 of The Taming of the Shrew happens inside the house or in a public place outside it.)
The Taming of the Shrew	III	1	Italy	Padua	Baptista's house
The Taming of the Shrew	III	2 (Note: The Oxford Complete Works, which is the source for all act and scene numbers in this table, has two scenes for the events surrounding Kate and Petruchio's wedding, act 3 scenes 2 and 3, where the other sources used on this page have just one, numbered 2. The split follows 3.2.127, Baptista's line "I'll after him, and see the event of this.")	Italy	Padua	Not specified (Note: This must be a public space: Heilman places it "outside Baptitsta's house". Characters leave this scene to go into the church, and later return from it.)
The Taming of the Shrew	III	3	Italy	Padua	Not specified
The Taming of the Shrew	IV	1	Italy	Not specified (Note: Petruchio is from Verona, although editors have generally followed Pope in setting this action at "Petruchio's Country House")	Petruchio's house
The Taming of the Shrew	IV	2	Italy	Padua	Outside Baptista's house
The Taming of the Shrew	IV	3	Italy	Not specified	Petruchio's house
The Taming of the Shrew	IV	4 (Note: The Oxford Complete Works, the source for all act and scene numbers in this table, has two separate scenes, act 4 scenes 4 and 5, where the other sources used in this table have just one, numbered 4. The break comes after line 4.4.71: Baptista's line "I follow you". Accordingly, scene 6 in this table, and the Oxford Complete Works, is scene 5 in the other sources cited.)	Italy	Padua	Outside Baptista's house
The Taming of the Shrew	IV	5	Italy	Padua	Outside Baptista's house
The Taming of the Shrew	IV	6	Italy	Not specified	The road to Padua
The Taming of the Shrew	V	1	Italy	Padua	Outside Lucentio's house
The Taming of the Shrew	V	2	Italy	Padua	Lucentio's house
The Tempest	I	1	None	At sea	On a ship at sea (Note: The stage direction "on a ship at sea" derives from Pope. The ship is wrecked on a journey from Tunis to Naples and therefore in the Mediterranean Sea, near to the fictional island upon which the rest of the action takes place.)
The Tempest	I	2	None	An unnamed island (Note: The Folio text describes the scene, slightly inaccurately, as "The Scene, an vn-inhabited Island" (sic). Pope called it "The Inchanted Isle" (sic). It is located in the Mediterranean Sea, since the King's ship is wrecked there on a journey from Tunis to Naples.)	Not specified (Note: Most editors have placed this scene at or near "Prospero's cell" although Vaughan and Vaughan point out that it need not be, and suggest that "presumably Miranda and Prospero are standing on a point ... where they can see the ship 'at sea'.")
The Tempest	II	1	None	An unnamed island	Another part of the island (Note: The first editor to use "another part of the island" for the various unspecified locations of The Tempest was Alexander Pope.)
The Tempest	II	2	None	An unnamed island	Another part of the island
The Tempest	III	1	None	An unnamed island	Not specified (Note: Early editors have mostly followed Theobald in setting Ferdinand's log-bearing scene "before Prospero's cell" but Vaughan and Vaughan point out that it could equally occur elsewhere on the island.)
The Tempest	III	2	None	An unnamed island	Another part of the island
The Tempest	III	3	None	An unnamed island	Another part of the island
The Tempest	IV	1	None	An unnamed island	Prospero's cell (Note: Most editors have followed either Pope in setting these scenes in "Prospero's Cave" or Capell and Theobald in setting them "before Prospero's cell". Vaughan and Vaughan do not specify a location.)
The Tempest	V	1	None	An unnamed island	Prospero's cell
The Tempest	Epilogue		None	An unnamed island	Prospero's cell
Timon of Athens	I	1	Greece	Athens	Timon's house
Timon of Athens	I	2	Greece	Athens	Timon's house
Timon of Athens	II	1	Greece	Athens	The Senator's home (Note: "The senator's home" derives from Capell although Rowe had set the scene as "a public place".)
Timon of Athens	II	2	Greece	Athens	Timon's house
Timon of Athens	III	1	Greece	Athens	Lucullus' house
Timon of Athens	III	2	Greece	Athens	A public place
Timon of Athens	III	3	Greece	Athens	Sempronius' house
Timon of Athens	III	4	Greece	Athens	Outside Timon's house
Timon of Athens	III	5	Greece	Athens	Timon's house
Timon of Athens	III	6	Greece	Athens	The senate house
Timon of Athens	III	7	Greece	Athens	Timon's house
Timon of Athens	IV	1	Greece	Athens	Outside Athens' walls
Timon of Athens	IV	2	Greece	Athens	Timon's house
Timon of Athens	IV	3	Greece	Athens	A forest outside Athens
Timon of Athens	V	1	Greece	Athens	A forest outside Athens
Timon of Athens	V	2	Greece	Athens	A forest outside Athens
Timon of Athens	V	3	Greece	Athens	Outside the walls of Athens
Timon of Athens	V	4	Greece	Athens	A forest outside Athens
Timon of Athens	V	5	Greece	Athens	Outside the walls of Athens
Titus Andronicus	I	1 (Note: Jonathan Bate cites Samuel Johnson's view that the Folio's act break is misplaced, and follows that conclusion in the numbering of the scenes in Bate's third series Arden edition of the play. Accordingly, in his version, act 2 scene 1 becomes the end of act 1 scene 1, and his act 2 scenes 1 to 3 are equivalent to act 2 scenes 2 to 4 of this table and of all other sources used.)	Italy	Rome	Not specified (Note: This lengthy scene encompasses several settings including the Capitol/Senate House (Note: The folio stage direction "aloft" indicates that the gallery of the playing house represented the senate house) and the public place before it, and the tomb of the Andronici.)
Titus Andronicus	II	1	Italy	Rome	Not specified
Titus Andronicus	II	2	Italy	Rome	Not specified (Note: Editors have had very different ideas for the setting of this scene, including "a forest", "a Lodge" and "before the Emperor's Palace")
Titus Andronicus	II	3	Italy	Rome	A forest
Titus Andronicus	II	4	Italy	Rome	A forest
Titus Andronicus	III	1	Italy	Rome	Not specified (Note: Lewis Theobald simply set this scene in "a street in Rome".)
Titus Andronicus	III	2	Italy	Rome	Titus' house
Titus Andronicus	IV	1	Italy	Rome	Titus' house (Note: Suggested settings have included "before Titus' house" and "Titus' garden".)
Titus Andronicus	IV	2	Italy	Rome	Not specified (Note: Theobald specified "the Palace".)
Titus Andronicus	IV	3	Italy	Rome	Outside the palace
Titus Andronicus	IV	4	Italy	Rome	The palace
Titus Andronicus	V	1	Italy	Rome	The Goths' camp outside Rome
Titus Andronicus	V	2	Italy	Rome	Outside Titus' house
Titus Andronicus	V	3	Italy	Rome	Titus' house (Note: Jonathan Bate says this scene "is imagined to begin outside Titus' house and then to move inside it")
Troilus and Cressida	Prologue		Turkey	Troy	Outside Troy
Troilus and Cressida	I	1	Turkey	Troy	Ilium (Note: "Ilium" is the name of King Priam's palace in Troy. See "Ilium" under more-specific settings above.)
Troilus and Cressida	I	2	Turkey	Troy	Not specified (Note: David Bevington describes the setting of the second scene of Troilus and Cressida as "fluid": it appears to begin either at Cressida's home or in a public place, and to develop somewhere that Cressida and Pandarus can look down, from above, on the troops returning from battle.)
Troilus and Cressida	I	3	Turkey	Troy	The Greek camp
Troilus and Cressida	II	1	Turkey	Troy	The Greek camp: outside Achilles' tent
Troilus and Cressida	II	2	Turkey	Troy	Ilium
Troilus and Cressida	II	3	Turkey	Troy	The Greek camp: outside Achilles' tent
Troilus and Cressida	III	1	Turkey	Troy	Ilium
Troilus and Cressida	III	2	Turkey	Troy	An orchard
Troilus and Cressida	III	3	Turkey	Troy	The Greek camp: outside Achilles' tent
Troilus and Cressida	IV	1 (Note: The Oxford Complete Works, which is the source for all act and scene numbers in this table, has seven scenes in Act 4 of Troilus and Cressida, where David Bevington's Arden edition, the source for most other information about the play in this table, has five. They correlate as follows, with the Oxford in bold text and the Arden in plain text, and with line numbers taken from the Arden: Scene 1: scene 1; Scene 2: scene 2 lines 1-75; Scene 3: scene 2 lines 76-110; Scene 4: scene 3; Scene 5: scene 4; Scene 6: scene 5 lines 1-117; Scene 7: scene 5 lines 118-293.)	Turkey	Troy	Not specified
Troilus and Cressida	IV	2	Turkey	Troy	Outside Calchas' house
Troilus and Cressida	IV	3	Turkey	Troy	Outside Calchas' house
Troilus and Cressida	IV	4	Turkey	Troy	Outside Calchas' house
Troilus and Cressida	IV	5	Turkey	Troy	Calchas' house
Troilus and Cressida	IV	6	Turkey	Troy	Between Troy and the Greek camp
Troilus and Cressida	IV	7	Turkey	Troy	Between Troy and the Greek camp
Troilus and Cressida	V	1	Turkey	Troy	The Greek camp: outside Achilles' tent
Troilus and Cressida	V	2	Turkey	Troy	The Greek camp: outside Calchas' and Menelaus' tents
Troilus and Cressida	V	3	Turkey	Troy	Ilium
Troilus and Cressida	V	4	Turkey	Troy	The battlefield
Troilus and Cressida	V	5	Turkey	Troy	The battlefield
Troilus and Cressida	V	6	Turkey	Troy	The battlefield
Troilus and Cressida	V	7	Turkey	Troy	The battlefield
Troilus and Cressida	V	8	Turkey	Troy	The battlefield
Troilus and Cressida	V	9	Turkey	Troy	The battlefield
Troilus and Cressida	V	10	Turkey	Troy	The battlefield
Troilus and Cressida	V	11	Turkey	Troy	The battlefield
Twelfth Night	I	1	Croatia, Bosnia and Herzegovina, Montenegro and Albania	Illyria (Note: No particular city or town within Illyria is mentioned.)	Orsino's palace
Twelfth Night	I	2	Croatia, Bosnia and Herzegovina, Montenegro and Albania	Illyria	The sea coast
Twelfth Night	I	3	Croatia, Bosnia and Herzegovina, Montenegro and Albania	Illyria	Olivia's house
Twelfth Night	I	4	Croatia, Bosnia and Herzegovina, Montenegro and Albania	Illyria	Orsino's palace
Twelfth Night	I	5	Croatia, Bosnia and Herzegovina, Montenegro and Albania	Illyria	Olivia's house
Twelfth Night	II	1	Croatia, Bosnia and Herzegovina, Montenegro and Albania	Illyria	Not specified (Note: Rowe suggested "a street" as the setting for this scene, while Capell suggested "the sea-coast".)
Twelfth Night	II	2	Croatia, Bosnia and Herzegovina, Montenegro and Albania	Illyria	A street
Twelfth Night	II	3	Croatia, Bosnia and Herzegovina, Montenegro and Albania	Illyria	Olivia's house (Note: This scene is sometimes called "the kitchen scene" due to the performance tradition of setting it in the kitchen of Olivia's house.)
Twelfth Night	II	4	Croatia, Bosnia and Herzegovina, Montenegro and Albania	Illyria	Orsino's palace
Twelfth Night	II	5	Croatia, Bosnia and Herzegovina, Montenegro and Albania	Illyria	Olivia's garden
Twelfth Night	III	1	Croatia, Bosnia and Herzegovina, Montenegro and Albania	Illyria	Olivia's garden
Twelfth Night	III	2	Croatia, Bosnia and Herzegovina, Montenegro and Albania	Illyria	Oliva's house
Twelfth Night	III	3	Croatia, Bosnia and Herzegovina, Montenegro and Albania	Illyria	A street
Twelfth Night	III	4	Croatia, Bosnia and Herzegovina, Montenegro and Albania	Illyria	Olivia's garden (Note: Keir Elam points out the confusion regarding the location of this scene: it is apparently set in Olivia's "orchard" but the officers later refer to "a private brabble" "here in the streets". Elam concludes "Audiences do not notice such details".)
Twelfth Night	IV	1	Croatia, Bosnia and Herzegovina, Montenegro and Albania	Illyria	Not specified (Note: Rowe suggested "the street".)
Twelfth Night	IV	2	Croatia, Bosnia and Herzegovina, Montenegro and Albania	Illyria	Not specified (Note: Malvolio's confinement has been depicted in a variety of ways on stage.)
Twelfth Night	IV	3	Croatia, Bosnia and Herzegovina, Montenegro and Albania	Illyria	At or near Olivia's house (Note: The only specific location of this scene is its proximity to a chantry.)
Twelfth Night	V	1	Croatia, Bosnia and Herzegovina, Montenegro and Albania	Illyria	At, or before, Olivia's house
The Two Gentlemen of Verona	I	1	Italy	Verona (Note: In William C. Carroll's words: "Were it not for the final word of the play's title, we might be hard-pressed to identify just which Italian city was home to Valentine, Proteus and Julia.")	Not specified (Note: Sylvan Barnet simply suggested "an open place".)
The Two Gentlemen of Verona	I	2	Italy	Verona	Julia's home
The Two Gentlemen of Verona	I	3	Italy	Verona	Not specified (Note: Some editors have suggested Proteus' father's house, others a public place.)
The Two Gentlemen of Verona	II	1	Italy	Milan	Not specified
The Two Gentlemen of Verona	II	2	Italy	Verona	Not specified (Note: Arthur Quiller-Couch and John Dover Wilson suggested "On a seat beneath the trees".)
The Two Gentlemen of Verona	II	3	Italy	Verona	Not specified (Note: Sylvan Barnet has "a street".)
The Two Gentlemen of Verona	II	4	Italy	Milan	The Duke's palace
The Two Gentlemen of Verona	II	5	Italy	Milan	Not specified. (Note: This scene appears to be set in Milan, and most editors have amended its opening line in the Folio, ending "...welcome to Padua", assuming this to be Shakespeare's mistake. Some performances have used the original line, treating it as a joke.)
The Two Gentlemen of Verona	II	6	Italy	Milan	Not specified (Note: This scene picks up the action of scene 4, therefore may be set at the Duke's palace)
The Two Gentlemen of Verona	II	7	Italy	Verona	Julia's house
The Two Gentlemen of Verona	III	1	Italy	Milan	The Duke's palace
The Two Gentlemen of Verona	III	2	Italy	Milan	The Duke's palace
The Two Gentlemen of Verona	IV	1	Italy	Milan	A forest outside Milan
The Two Gentlemen of Verona	IV	2	Italy	Milan	Beneath Silvia's window
The Two Gentlemen of Verona	IV	3	Italy	Milan	Beneath Silvia's window
The Two Gentlemen of Verona	IV	4	Italy	Milan	Beneath Silvia's window
The Two Gentlemen of Verona	V	1	Italy	Milan	"Friar Patrick's cell" (Note: Friar Patrick is not a character in The Two Gentlemen of Verona.)
The Two Gentlemen of Verona	V	2	Italy	Milan	The Duke's palace
The Two Gentlemen of Verona	V	3	Italy	Milan	The forest outside Milan
The Two Gentlemen of Verona	V	4	Italy	Milan	The forest outside Milan
The Two Noble Kinsmen	Prologue		None		
The Two Noble Kinsmen	I	1	Greece	Athens	Not specified (Note: In two of Shakespeare and Fletcher's sources, Boccaccio's Teseida and Chaucer's The Knight's Tale, this opening scene is set outside Athens, near the Temple of Clemency. Eugene M. Waith locates the scene "near the temple at Athens in which Theseus and Hippolyta are to be married")
The Two Noble Kinsmen	I	2	Greece	Thebes	Not specified
The Two Noble Kinsmen	I	3	Greece	Athens	Outside Athens (Note: The dialogue suggests that the ladies have accompanied Pirithous part of the way of his journey from Athens to meet with Theseus at Thebes.)
The Two Noble Kinsmen	I	4	Greece	Thebes	Outside Thebes (Note: This scene comprises Theseus' victory procession over the Thebans.)
The Two Noble Kinsmen	I	5	Greece	Thebes	Outside Thebes (Note: This scene comprises the funeral processions of the three queens' deceased husbands.)
The Two Noble Kinsmen	II	1	Greece	Athens	Outside the prison
The Two Noble Kinsmen	II	2	Greece	Athens	The prison
The Two Noble Kinsmen	II	3	Greece	Athens	Outside Athens
The Two Noble Kinsmen	II	4	Greece	Athens	Not specified (Note: Eugene Waith places the scene "probably near the prison")
The Two Noble Kinsmen	II	5	Greece	Athens	Near a stadium in Athens
The Two Noble Kinsmen	II	6	Greece	Athens	Near the prison (Note: The wording of the jailer's daughter's speech, with its parallel "I have brought ... I have sent", can be read that she has brought Palamon to the wood and that this short scene is therefore set there. Potter and Waith both prefer the interpretation that she has sent Palamon to the wood, so this scene occurs near the prison.)
The Two Noble Kinsmen	III	1	Greece	Athens	A forest near Athens
The Two Noble Kinsmen	III	2	Greece	Athens	A forest near Athens
The Two Noble Kinsmen	III	3	Greece	Athens	A forest near Athens
The Two Noble Kinsmen	III	4	Greece	Athens	A forest near Athens
The Two Noble Kinsmen	III	5	Greece	Athens	A forest near Athens
The Two Noble Kinsmen	III	6	Greece	Athens	A forest near Athens
The Two Noble Kinsmen	IV	1	Greece	Athens	The prison
The Two Noble Kinsmen	IV	2	Greece	Athens	The palace
The Two Noble Kinsmen	IV	3	Greece	Athens	The prison
The Two Noble Kinsmen	V	1 (Note: The Oxford Complete Works, which is the source for all act and scene numbers in this table, has three scenes, act 5 scenes 1 to 3, where the other sources used on this page, Eugene Waith's Oxford and Lois Potter's Arden editions, have just one, act 5 scene 1. The scene breaks are before lines 69 and 137 of the Arden edition. It follows that act 5 scenes 4 to 6 in the Oxford Complete Works, and this table, correlate with scenes 2 to 4 of the other editions.)	Greece	Athens	The tournament site (Note: If Theseus has kept his word at 3.6.291-292 then this is the same place in the forest where Palamon and Arcite previously fought, but changed by the addition of temples to Mars, Venus and Diana: probably represented successively by a single altar in the original staging. In The Knight's Tale, the tournament takes place in an amphitheatre with an altar to each of the three gods.)
The Two Noble Kinsmen	V	2	Greece	Athens	The tournament site
The Two Noble Kinsmen	V	3	Greece	Athens	The tournament site
The Two Noble Kinsmen	V	4	Greece	Athens	The prison
The Two Noble Kinsmen	V	5	Greece	Athens	The forest, near the tournament site
The Two Noble Kinsmen	V	6	Greece	Athens	The forest, near the tournament site
The Two Noble Kinsmen	Epilogue		None		
The Winter's Tale	I	1	Italy	Sicilia (Note: No particular town or city within Sicilia or Bohemia is mentioned in The Winter's Tale.)	Leontes' palace (Note: Theobald set the opening scene in "an antechamber")
The Winter's Tale	I	2	Italy	Sicilia	Leontes' palace (Note: Editors are not agreed whither this scene is set in Leontes' court, in another public place, or in private.)
The Winter's Tale	II	1	Italy	Sicilia	Leontes' palace (Note: This scene is set in a private place - possibly the queen's chamber.)
The Winter's Tale	II	2	Italy	Sicilia	A prison
The Winter's Tale	II	3	Italy	Sicilia	Leontes' palace (Note: Possibly Leontes' private chamber)
The Winter's Tale	III	1	Italy	Sicilia	Not specified (Note: In this scene Cleomenes and Dion are travelling back to Leontes' court from Delphos.)
The Winter's Tale	III	2	Italy	Sicilia	Leontes' court
The Winter's Tale	III	3	Czechia	Bohemia	The seashore
The Winter's Tale	IV	1	Czechia	Bohemia	None (Note: This short scene is a speech given by Time as chorus, who asks the audience to "Imagine me, gentle spectators, that I now may be in fair Bohemia...")
The Winter's Tale	IV	2	Czechia	Bohemia	Not specified (Note: John Pitcher places this scene at "probably" the Bohemian court.)
The Winter's Tale	IV	3	Czechia	Bohemia	A road (Note: John Pitcher describes the setting as a back road in rural Bohemia.)
The Winter's Tale	IV	4	Czechia	Bohemia	The sheep-shearing festival (Note: The location of this long scene is fluid, and appears to begin indoors although mostly set outdoors.)
The Winter's Tale	V	1	Italy	Sicilia	Leontes' palace (Note: John Pitcher adds "probably the audience chamber".)
The Winter's Tale	V	2	Italy	Sicilia	In or near Leontes' palace (Note: The location is not further specified.)
The Winter's Tale	V	3	Italy	Sicilia	Paulina's secluded house
