= Henry VI, Part 1 =

Play by Shakespeare

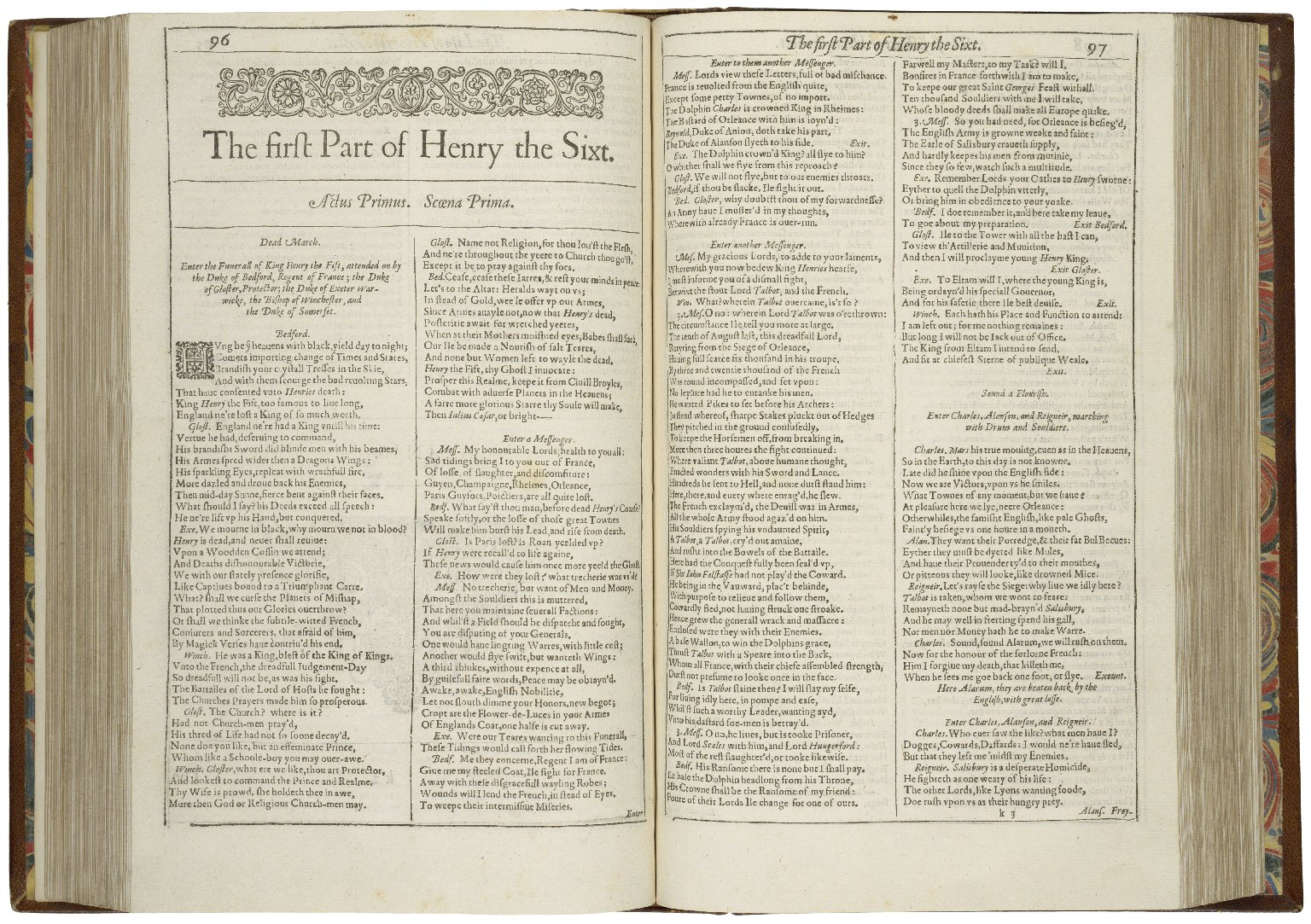
First page of The first Part of Henry the Sixt from the First Folio (1623).

Henry VI, Part 1, often referred to as 1 Henry VI, is a history play by William Shakespeare—possibly in collaboration with Thomas Nashe and others—believed to have been written in 1591. It is set during the lifetime of King Henry VI of England.

Henry VI, Part 1 deals with the loss of England's French territories and the political machinations leading up to the Wars of the Roses, as the English political system is torn apart by personal squabbles and petty jealousy. Henry VI, Part 2 deals with the King's inability to quell the bickering of his nobles and the inevitability of armed conflict and Henry VI, Part 3 deals with the horrors of that conflict.

Although the Henry VI trilogy may not have been written in chronological order, the three plays are often grouped together with Richard III to form a tetralogy covering the entire Wars of the Roses saga, from the death of Henry V in 1422 to the rise to power of Henry VII in 1485. It was the success of this sequence of plays that firmly established Shakespeare's reputation as a playwright.

Some regard Henry VI, Part 1 as the weakest of Shakespeare's plays. Along with Titus Andronicus, it is generally considered one of the strongest candidates for evidence that Shakespeare collaborated with other dramatists early in his career.

== Characters ==
The English

- King Henry VI – King of England
- Duke of Bedford – Henry VI's uncle and regent of France
- Humphrey, Duke of Gloucester – Henry VI's uncle and Lord Protector of England
- Duke of Exeter – Henry VI's great-uncle
- Henry Beaufort, Bishop of Winchester – Exeter's younger brother and Henry VI's great-uncle
- Duke of Somerset (a conflation of John Beaufort, 1st Duke of Somerset and his younger brother Edmund Beaufort, 2nd Duke of Somerset - Henry VI's first cousins once removed and the latter the Earl of Warwick's son-in-law)
- Richard Plantagenet – later 3rd Duke of York, Henry VI's second cousin once removed
- Earl of Warwick (Richard de Beauchamp, 13th Earl of Warwick—often mistakenly identified as Richard Neville, 16th Earl of Warwick, from Henry VI, Part 2 and Henry VI, Part 3)
- Earl of Salisbury
- William de la Pole, Earl of Suffolk - the Earl of Warwick's first cousin once removed
- Lord Talbot – Constable of France and the Earl of Warwick's son-in-law
- John Talbot – Lord Talbot's son
- Edmund Mortimer, Earl of March (a conflation of Sir Edmund Mortimer, his brother Sir John, and his nephew, Edmund Mortimer, 5th Earl of March – Henry VI's second cousins once removed and third cousin, respectively)
- Sir John Fastolf – a cowardly soldier
- Sir William Glansdale
- Sir Thomas Gargrave
- Sir William Lucy
- Vernon – of the White Rose (York) faction
- Basset – of the Red Rose (Lancaster) faction
- Richard Woodville – Lieutenant of the Tower
- Mayor of London

The French

- Charles – Dauphin of France
- Reignier, Duke of Anjou – titular King of Jerusalem
- Margaret – Reignier's daughter, later betrothed to King Henry
- Duke of Alençon
- Bastard of Orléans
- Duke of Burgundy
- General of the French forces at Bordeaux
- Countess of Auvergne
- Master Gunner of Orléans
- Master Gunner's son
- Joan la Pucelle (Joan of Arc)
- Shepherd – Joan's father
- Governor of Paris (non-speaking role)
- French Sergeant
- Sentinels
- Watchman of Rouen
- Porter

Other

- Papal Legate
- Fiends
- Messengers, a captain, lawyer, a gaoler, soldiers, heralds, scouts, on both the English and French sides

== Synopsis ==
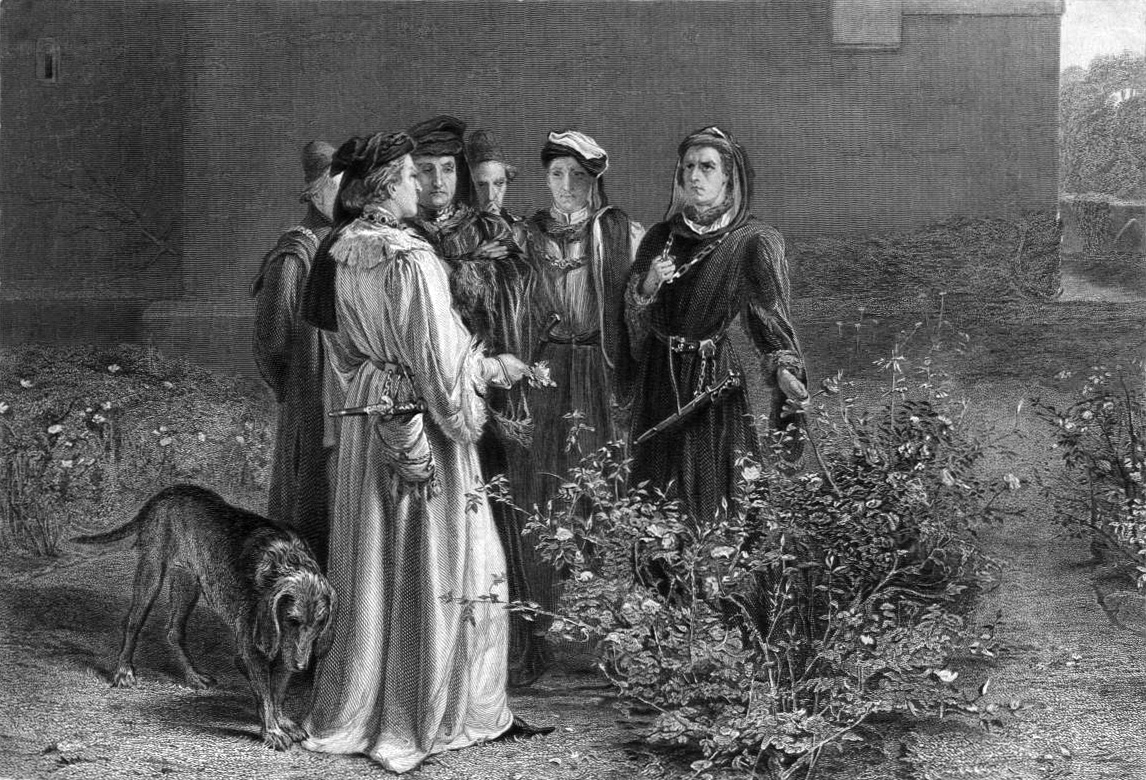
Frederick and Alfred Heath engraving of Scene in the Temple Garden by John Pettie (1871)

The play begins with the funeral of Henry V, who has died unexpectedly in his prime. As his brothers, the Dukes of Bedford and Gloucester, and his uncle, the Duke of Exeter, lament his passing and express doubt as to whether his son (the as yet uncrowned heir apparent Henry VI) is capable of running the country in such tumultuous times, word arrives of military setbacks in France. A rebellion, led by the Dauphin Charles, is gaining momentum, and several major towns have already been lost. Additionally, Lord Talbot has been captured. Realising a critical time is at hand, Bedford immediately prepares himself to head to France and take command of the army, Gloucester remains in charge in England, and Exeter sets out to prepare young Henry for his forthcoming coronation.

Meanwhile, in Orléans, the English army is laying siege to Charles' forces. Inside the city, the Bastard of Orléans approaches Charles and tells him of a young woman who claims to have seen visions and knows how to defeat the English. Charles summons the woman, Joan la Pucelle (i.e. Joan of Arc). To test her resolve, he challenges her to single combat. Upon her victory, he immediately places her in command of the army. Outside the city, the newly arrived Bedford negotiates the release of Talbot, but immediately, Joan launches an attack. The French forces win, forcing the English back, but Talbot and Bedford engineer a sneak attack on the city, and gain a foothold within the walls, causing the French leaders to flee.

Back in England, a petty quarrel between Richard Plantagenet and the Duke of Somerset has expanded to involve the whole court. Richard and Somerset ask their fellow nobles to pledge allegiance to one of them, and as such the lords select either red or white roses to indicate the side they are on. Richard then goes to see his uncle, Edmund Mortimer, imprisoned in the Tower of London. Mortimer tells Richard the history of their family's conflict with the king's family—how they helped Henry Bolingbroke seize power from Richard II, but were then shoved into the background; and how Henry V had Richard's father (Richard of Conisburgh) executed and his family stripped of all its lands and monies. Mortimer also tells Richard that he himself is the rightful heir to the throne, and that when he dies, Richard will be the true heir, not Henry. Amazed at these revelations, Richard determines to attain his birthright, and vows to have his family's dukedom restored. After Mortimer dies, Richard presents his petition to the recently crowned Henry, who agrees to reinstate the Plantagenet's title, making Richard 3rd Duke of York. Henry then leaves for France, accompanied by Gloucester, Exeter, Winchester, Richard and Somerset.

In France, within a matter of hours, the French retake and then lose the city of Rouen. After the battle, Bedford dies, and Talbot assumes direct command of the army. The Dauphin is horrified at the loss of Rouen, but Joan tells him not to worry. She then persuades the powerful Duke of Burgundy, who had been fighting for the English, to switch sides, and join the French. Meanwhile, Henry arrives in Paris and upon learning of Burgundy's betrayal, he sends Talbot to speak with him. Henry then pleads for Richard and Somerset to put aside their conflict, and, unaware of the implications of his actions, he chooses a red rose, symbolically aligning himself with Somerset and alienating Richard. Prior to returning to England, in an effort to secure peace between Somerset and Richard, Henry places Richard in command of the infantry and Somerset in command of the cavalry. Meanwhile, Talbot approaches Bordeaux, but the French army swings around and traps him. Talbot sends word for reinforcements, but the conflict between Richard and Somerset leads them to second guess one another, and neither of them send any, both blaming the other for the mix-up. The English army is subsequently destroyed, and both Talbot and his son are killed.

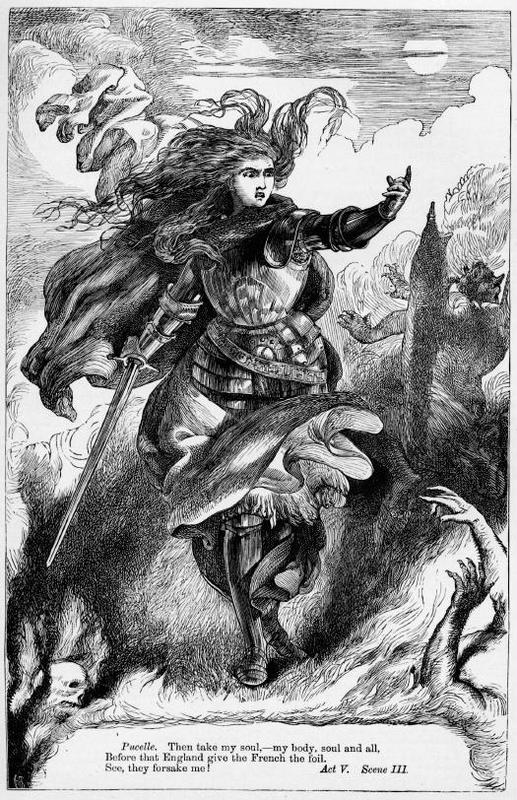
H. C. Selous's illustration of Joan's fiends abandoning her in Act 5, Scene 3; from The Plays of William Shakespeare: The Historical Plays, edited by Charles Cowden Clarke and Mary Cowden Clarke (1830)

After the battle, Joan's visions desert her, and she is captured by Richard and burned at the stake. At the same time, urged on by Pope Eugenius IV and the Holy Roman Emperor, Sigismund, Henry sues for peace. The French listen to the English terms, under which Charles is to be a viceroy to Henry and reluctantly agree, but only with the intention of breaking their oath at a later date and expelling the English from France. Meanwhile, the Earl of Suffolk has captured a young French princess, Margaret of Anjou, whom he intends to marry to Henry in order that he can dominate the king through her. Travelling back to England, he attempts to persuade Henry to marry Margaret. Gloucester advises Henry against the marriage, as Margaret's family is not rich and the marriage would not be advantageous to his position as king. But Henry is taken in by Suffolk's description of Margaret's beauty, and he agrees to the proposal. Suffolk then heads back to France to bring Margaret to England as Gloucester worriedly ponders what the future may hold.

== Sources ==
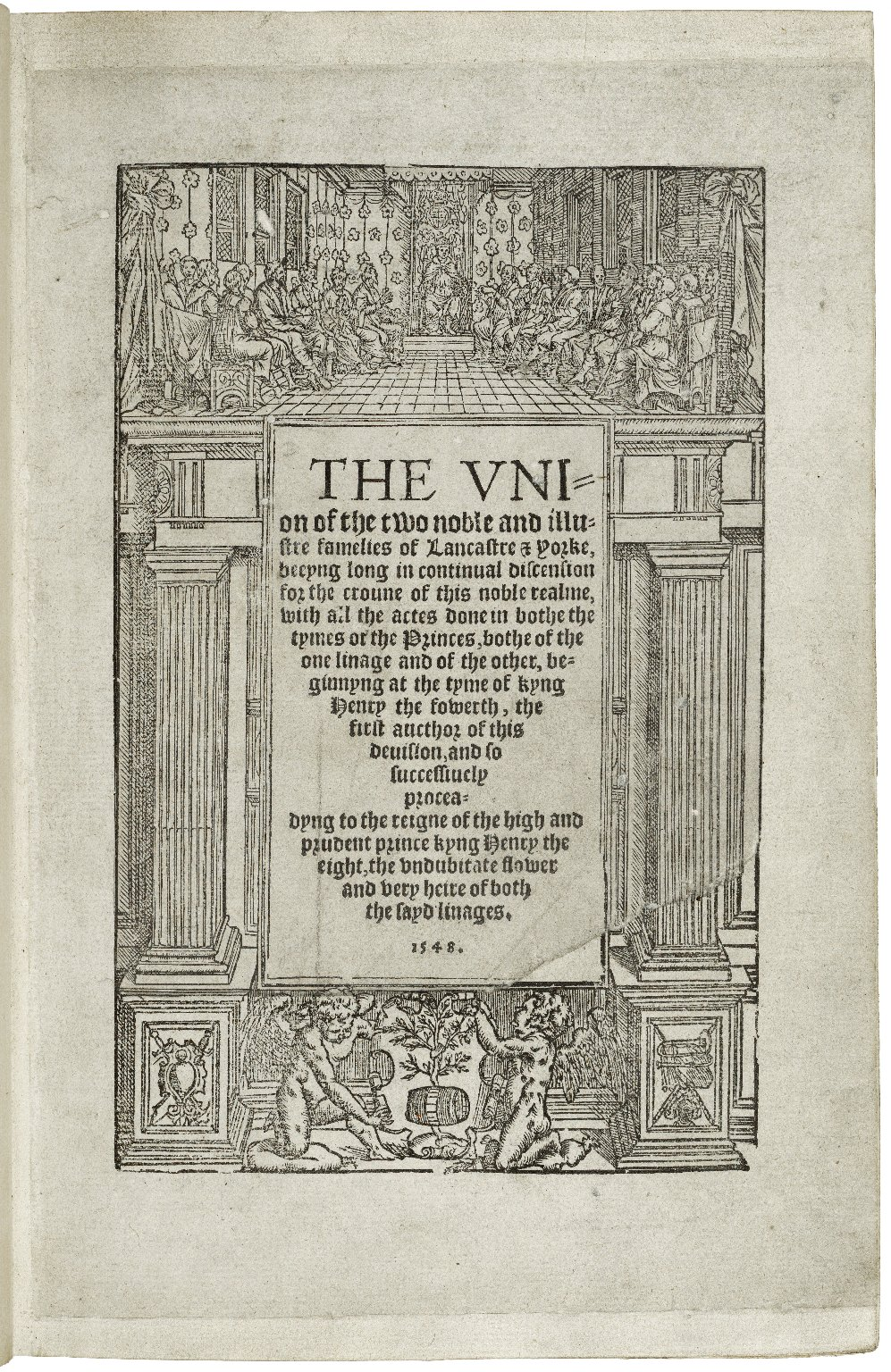
Title page from the 1550 edition of Edward Hall's The Union of the Two Noble and Illustre Families of Lancaster and York.

Shakespeare's primary source for 1 Henry VI was Edward Hall's The Union of the Two Noble and Illustre Families of Lancaster and York (1548). Also, as with most of Shakespeare's chronicle histories, Raphael Holinshed's Chronicles of England, Scotland and Ireland (1577; 2nd edition 1587) was also consulted. Holinshed based much of his Wars of the Roses information in the Chronicles on Hall's information in Union of the Two Noble and Illustre Families, even to the point of reproducing large portions of it verbatim. However, there are enough differences between Hall and Holinshed to establish that Shakespeare must have consulted both of them.

For example, Shakespeare must have used Hall for the scene where Gloucester is attempting to gain access to the Tower, and Woodville tells him that the order not to admit anyone came from Winchester. Dismayed, Gloucester refers to Winchester as "that haughty prelate,/Whom Henry, our late sovereign, ne're could brook" (1.3.23–24). Only in Hall is there any indication that Henry V had a problem with Winchester. In Holinshed, there is nothing to suggest any disagreement or conflict between them. Another example of Shakespeare's use of Hall is found when Sir Thomas Gargrave is injured by the artillery strike at Orléans (1.5). In the play, he dies immediately, and the rest of the scene focuses on the death of the more senior soldier Salisbury. Likewise, in Hall, Gargrave dies immediately after the attack. In Holinshed, however, Gargrave takes two days to die (as he did in reality). The semi-comic scene where the French leaders are forced to flee Orléans half-dressed (dramatised in 2.1) also seems based on an incident reported only in Hall. When discussing the English retaking of Le Mans in 1428, Hall writes, "The French, suddenly taken, were so amazed in so much that some of them, being not out of their beds, got up in their shirts." Another incident involving Gloucester and Winchester is also unique to Hall. During their debate in Act 3, Scene 1, Gloucester accuses Winchester of attempting to have him assassinated on London Bridge. Hall mentions this assassination attempt, explaining that it was supposed to have taken place at the Southwark end of the bridge in an effort to prevent Gloucester from joining Henry V in Eltham Palace. In Holinshed however, there is no reference to any such incident. Another incident possibly taken from Hall is found in Act 3, Scene 2, where Joan and the French soldiers disguise themselves as peasants and sneak into Rouen. This is not an historical event, and it is not recorded in either Hall or Holinshed. However, a very similar such incident is recorded in Hall, where he reports of the capture of Cornhill Castle in Cornhill-on-Tweed by the English in 1441.

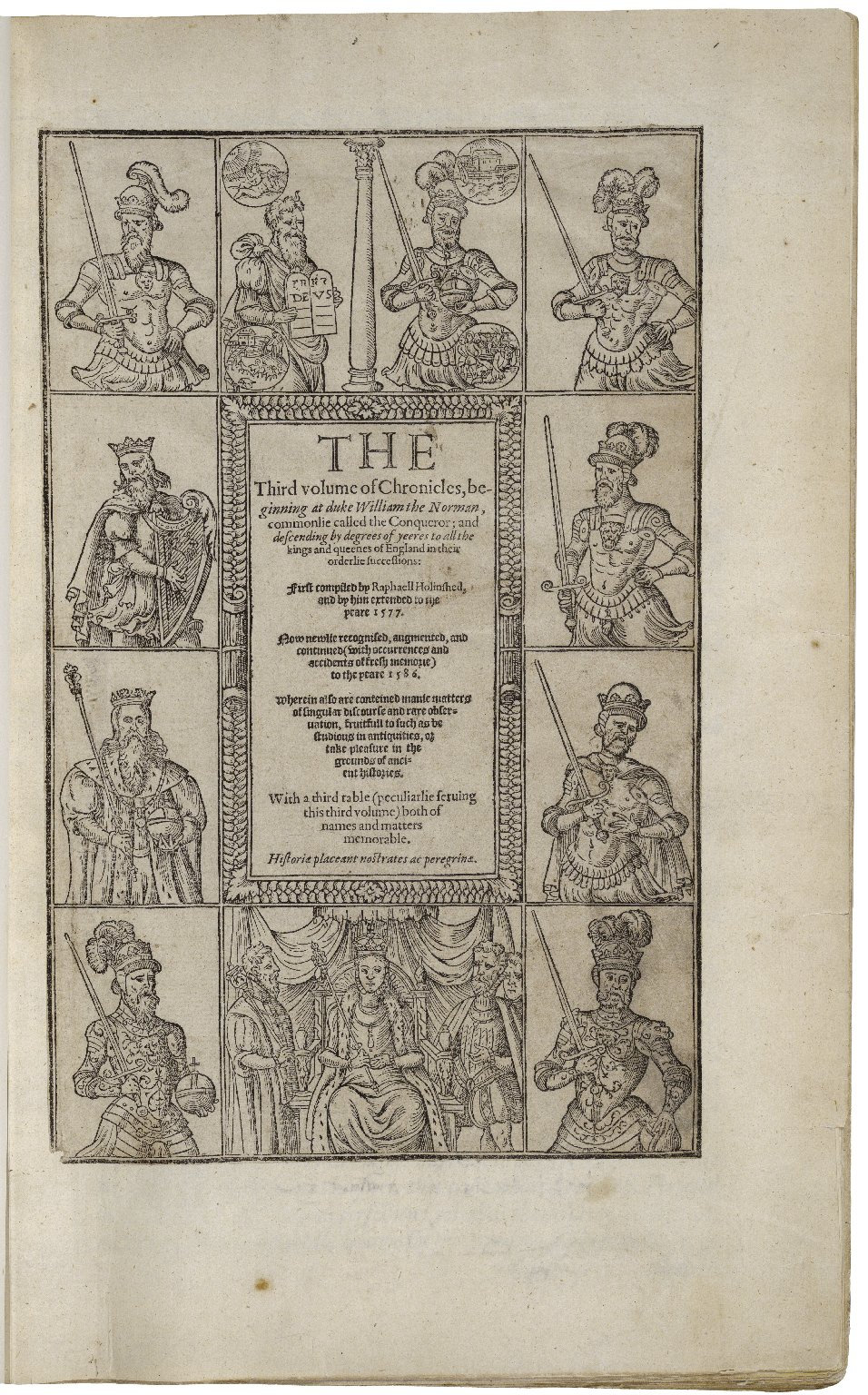
Title page of the second edition of Holinshed's Chronicles (1587).

On the other hand, some aspects of the play are unique to Holinshed. For example, in the opening scene, as word arrives in England of the rebellion in France, Exeter says to his fellow peers, "Remember, Lords, your oaths to Henry sworn:/Either to quell the Dauphin utterly,/Or bring him in obedience to your yoke" (1.1.162–164). Only in Holinshed is it reported that on his deathbed, Henry V elicited vows from Bedford, Gloucester and Exeter that they would never willingly surrender France, and would never allow the Dauphin to become king. Another piece of information unique to Holinshed is seen when Charles compares Joan to the Old Testament prophetess Deborah (1.2.105). According to Judges 4 and 5, Deborah masterminded Barak's surprise victory against the Canaanite army led by Sisera, which had suppressed the Israelites for over twenty years. No such comparison is found in Hall. Another piece of information unique to Holinshed occurs when the Master Gunner mentions that the English have taken control of some of the suburbs of Orléans (1.4.2). Holinshed reports that the English captured several of the suburbs on the other side of the Loire, something not found in Hall.

== Date and text ==
=== Date ===
The most important evidence for dating 1 Henry VI is the Diary of Philip Henslowe, which records a performance of a play by Lord Strange's Men called Harey Vj (i.e. Henry VI) on 3 March 1592 at the Rose Theatre in Southwark. Henslowe refers to the play as "ne" (which most critics take to mean "new", although it could be an abbreviation for the Newington Butts theatre, which Henslow may have owned) and mentions that it had fifteen performances and earned £3.16s.8d, meaning it was extremely successful. (Note: According to Andrew Gurr, these earnings made it the second most profitable play of the year, after the anonymous (and now lost) The Wise Man of Westchester (Playgoing in Shakespeare's London, Cambridge: Cambridge University Press, 1987, 136)) Harey Vj is usually accepted as being 1 Henry VI for a couple of reasons. Firstly, it is unlikely to have been either 2 Henry VI or 3 Henry VI, as they were published in 1594 and 1595, respectively, with the titles under which they would have originally been performed, so as to ensure higher sales. As neither of them appears under the title Harey Vj, the play seen by Henslowe is unlikely to be either of them. Additionally, as Gary Taylor points out, Henslowe tended to identify sequels, but not first parts, to which he referred by the general title. As such, "Harey Vj could not be a Part Two or Part Three but could easily be a Part One." The only other option is that Harey Vj is a now lost play.

That Harey Vj is not a lost play, however, seems to be confirmed by a reference in Thomas Nashe's Piers Penniless his Supplication to the Devil (entered into the Stationers' Register on 8 August 1592), which supports the theory that Harey Vj is 1 Henry VI. Nashe praises a play that features Lord Talbot: "How would it have joyed brave Talbot (the terror of the French), to think that after he had lain two hundred years in his tomb, he should triumph again on the stage, and have his bones new embalmed with the tears of ten thousand spectators (at least), who in the tragedian that represents his person imagine they behold him fresh bleeding." It is thought that Nashe is here referring to Harey Vj, i.e. 1 Henry VI, as there is no other candidate for a play featuring Talbot from this time period (although again, there is the slight possibility that both Henslowe and Nashe are referring to a now lost play).

If Nashe's comment is accepted as evidence that the play seen by Henslowe was 1 Henry VI, to have been on stage as a new play in March 1592, it must have been written in 1591.

There is a separate question concerning the date of composition, however. Due to the publication in March 1594 of a quarto version of 2 Henry VI (under the title The First part of the Contention betwixt the two famous Houses of Yorke and Lancaster, with the death of the good Duke Humphrey: And the banishment and death of the Duke of Suffolke, and the Tragicall end of the proud Cardinal of Winchester, with the notable Rebellion of Jack Cade: and the Duke of Yorke's first claim unto the crowne) and an octavo version of 3 Henry VI in 1595 (under the title The True Tragedie of Richard Duke of Yorke, and the death of good King Henrie the Sixt, with the Whole Contention betweene the two Houses, Lancaster and Yorke), neither of which refers to 1 Henry VI, some critics have argued that 2 Henry VI and 3 Henry VI were written prior to 1 Henry VI. This theory was first suggested by E.K. Chambers in 1923 and revised by John Dover Wilson in 1952. The theory is that The Contention and True Tragedy were originally conceived as a two-part play, and due to their success, a prequel was created. Obviously, the title of The Contention, where it is referred to as The First Part, is a large part of this theory, but various critics have offered further pieces of evidence to suggest 1 Henry VI was not the first play written in the trilogy. R.B. McKerrow, for example, argues that "if 2 Henry VI was originally written to continue the first part, it seems utterly incomprehensible that it should contain no allusion to the prowess of Talbot." McKerrow also comments on the lack of reference to the symbolic use of roses in 2 Henry VI, whereas in 1 Henry VI and 3 Henry VI, they are mentioned numerous times. McKerrow concludes that this suggests 1 Henry VI was written closer to 3 Henry VI, and as we know 3 Henry VI was definitely a sequel, it means that 1 Henry VI must have been written last, i.e., Shakespeare only conceived of the use of the roses while writing 3 Henry VI and then incorporated the idea into his prequel. Eliot Slater comes to the same conclusion in his statistical examination of the vocabulary of all three Henry VI plays, where he argues that 1 Henry VI was written either immediately before or immediately after 3 Henry VI, hence it must have been written last. Likewise, Gary Taylor, in his analysis of the authorship of 1 Henry VI, argues that the many discrepancies between 1 Henry VI and 2 Henry VI (such as the lack of reference to Talbot) coupled with similarities in the vocabulary, phraseology, and tropes of 1 Henry VI and 3 Henry VI, suggest 1 Henry VI was probably written last.

One argument against this theory is that 1 Henry VI is the weakest of the trilogy, and therefore, logic would suggest it was written first. This argument suggests that Shakespeare could only have created such a weak play if it was his first attempt to turn his chronicle sources into drama. In essence, he was unsure of his way, and as such, 1 Henry VI was a trial-run of sorts, making way for the more accomplished 2 Henry VI and 3 Henry VI. Emrys Jones is one notable critic who supports this view. The standard rebuke to this theory, and the one used by Dover Wilson in 1952, is that 1 Henry VI is significantly weaker than the other two plays not because it was written first but because it was co-authored and may have been Shakespeare's first attempt to collaborate with other writers. As such, all of the play's problems can be attributed to its co-authors rather than Shakespeare himself, who may have had a relatively limited hand in its composition. In this sense, the fact that 1 Henry VI is the weakest of the trilogy has nothing to do with when it may have been written, but instead concerns only how it was written.

As this implies, there is no critical consensus on this issue. Samuel Johnson, writing in his 1765 edition of The Plays of William Shakespeare, pre-empted the debate and argued that the plays were written in sequence: "It is apparent that [2 Henry VI] begins where the former ends, and continues the series of transactions, of which it presupposes the first part already written. This is a sufficient proof that the second and third parts were not written without dependence on the first." Numerous more recent scholars continue to uphold Johnson's argument. E. M. W. Tillyard, for example, writing in 1944, believes the plays were written in order, as does Andrew S. Cairncross in his editions of all three plays for the 2nd series of the Arden Shakespeare (1957, 1962 and 1964). E.A.J. Honigmann also agrees, in his "early start" theory of 1982 (which argues that Shakespeare's first play was Titus Andronicus, which Honigmann posits was written in 1586). Likewise, Michael Hattaway, in both his 1990 New Cambridge Shakespeare edition of 1 Henry VI and his 1991 edition of 2 Henry VI, argues that the evidence suggests 1 Henry VI was written first. In his 2001 introduction to Henry VI: Critical Essays, Thomas A. Pendleton makes a similar argument, as does Roger Warren in his 2003 edition of 2 Henry VI for the Oxford Shakespeare.

On the other hand, Edward Burns, in his 2000 Arden Shakespeare 3rd series edition of 1 Henry VI, and Ronald Knowles, in his 1999 Arden Shakespeare 3rd series edition of 2 Henry VI, make the case that 2 Henry VI probably preceded 1 Henry VI. Similarly, Randall Martin, in his 2001 Oxford Shakespeare edition of 3 Henry VI, argues that 1 Henry VI was almost certainly written last. In his 2003 Oxford edition of 1 Henry VI, Michael Taylor agrees with Martin. Additionally, it is worth noting that in the Oxford Shakespeare: Complete Works of 1986 and the 2nd edition of 2005, and in the Norton Shakespeare of 1997 and again in 2008, both 2 Henry VI and 3 Henry VI precede 1 Henry VI.

Ultimately, the question of the order of composition remains unanswered, and the only thing that critics can agree on is that all three plays (in whatever order) were written by early 1592 at the latest.

=== Text ===
The text of the play was not published until the 1623 First Folio, under the title The first part of Henry the Sixt.

When it came to be called Part 1 is unclear, although most critics tend to assume it was the invention of the First Folio editors, John Heminges and Henry Condell, as there are no references to the play under the title Part 1, or any derivative thereof, prior to 1623. (Note: In the Stationers' Register on 19 April 1602 an entry refers to The firste and Second parte of Henry the Vj, which has often been taken to mean 1 Henry VI and 2 Henry VI. However, this entry actually refers to 2 Henry VI and 3 Henry VI, which were entered into the Register when Thomas Millington sold his rights to the plays to Thomas Pavier. Confusingly however, when 1 Henry VI was entered into the Register in 1623 for publication in the First Folio, it was registered as The thirde parte of Henry ye Sixt (because the names of the first and second parts were already taken). For more information, see Ronald Knowles' 1999 Arden edition of 2 Henry VI (119), and Randall Martin's 2001 Oxford edition of 3 Henry VI (104n1).)

== Analysis and criticism ==
=== Critical history ===
Some critics argue that the Henry VI trilogy were the first plays based on recent English history, and, as such, they deserve an elevated position in the canon and a more central role in Shakespearean criticism. According to F. P. Wilson, for example, "There is no certain evidence that any dramatist before the defeat of the Spanish Armada in 1588 dared to put upon the public stage a play based upon English history [...] so far as we know, Shakespeare was the first." However, not all critics agree with Wilson here. For example, Michael Taylor argues that there were at least thirty-nine history plays prior to 1592, including the two-part Christopher Marlowe play Tamburlaine (1587), Thomas Lodge's The Wounds of Civil War (1588), the anonymous The Troublesome Reign of King John (1588), Edmund Ironside (1590 – also anonymous), Robert Green's Selimus (1591) and another anonymous play, The True Tragedy of Richard III (1591). Paola Pugliatti however argues that the case may be somewhere between Wilson and Taylor's argument: "Shakespeare may not have been the first to bring English history before the audience of a public playhouse, but he was certainly the first to treat it in the manner of a mature historian rather than in the manner of a worshipper of historical, political and religious myth."

Another issue often discussed amongst critics is the quality of the play. Along with 3 Henry VI, 1 Henry VI has traditionally been seen as one of Shakespeare's weakest works, with critics often citing the amount of violence as indicative of Shakespeare's artistic immaturity and inability to handle his chronicle sources, especially when compared to the more nuanced and far less violent second historical tetralogy (Richard II, 1 Henry IV, 2 Henry IV and Henry V). For example, critics such as E. M. W. Tillyard, Irving Ribner and A. P. Rossiter have all claimed that the play violates neoclassical precepts of drama, which dictate that violence and battle should never be shown mimetically on stage, but should always be reported diegetically in dialogue. This view was based on traditional notions of the distinction between high and low art, a distinction based partly upon Philip Sidney's An Apology for Poetry (1579). Based on the work of Horace, Sidney criticised Thomas Norton and Thomas Sackville's Gorboduc (1561) for showing too many battles and being too violent when it would have been more artistic to verbally represent such scenes. The belief was that any play that showed violence was crude, appealing only to the ignorant masses, and was therefore low art. On the other hand, any play that elevated itself above such direct representation of violence and instead relied on the writer's ability to verbalise and his skill for diegesis, was considered artistically superior and, therefore, high art. Writing in 1605, Ben Jonson commented in The Masque of Blackness that showing battles on stage was only "for the vulgar, who are better delighted with that which pleaseth the eye, than contenteth the ear." Based upon these theories, 1 Henry VI, with its numerous on-stage skirmishes and multiple scenes of violence and murder, was considered a coarse play with little to recommend it to the intelligentsia.

On the other hand, however, writers like Thomas Heywood and Thomas Nashe praised battle scenes in general as often being intrinsic to the play and not simply vulgar distractions for the illiterate. In Piers Penniless (1592), Nashe praised the didactic element of drama that depicted battle and martial action, arguing that such plays were a good way of teaching both history and military tactics to the masses; in such plays "our forefather's valiant acts (that have lain long buried in rusty brass and worm-eaten books) are revived." Nashe also argued that plays that depict glorious national causes from the past rekindle a patriotic fervour that has been lost in "the puerility of an insipid present," and that such plays "provide a rare exercise of virtue in reproof to these degenerate effeminate days of ours." Similarly, in An Apology for Actors (1612), Heywood writes, "So bewitching a thing is lively and well-spirited action, that it hath power to new mould the hearts of the spectators, and fashion them to the shape of any noble and notable attempt." More recently, Michael Goldman has argued that battle scenes are vital to the overall movement and purpose of the play; "the sweep of athletic bodies across the stage is used not only to provide an exciting spectacle but to focus and clarify, to render dramatic, the entire unwieldy chronicle."

Questions of originality and quality, however, are not the only critical disagreement 1 Henry VI has provoked. Numerous other issues divide critics, not the least of which concerns the authorship of the play.

==== Attribution studies ====
A number of Shakespeare's early plays have been examined for signs of co-authorship (The Taming of the Shrew, The Contention [i.e., 2 Henry VI], and True Tragedy [i.e., 3 Henry VI], for example), but, along with Titus Andronicus, 1 Henry VI stands as the most likely to have been a collaboration between Shakespeare and at least one other dramatist whose identity remains unknown. Thomas Nashe, Robert Greene, George Peele, Christopher Marlowe and Thomas Kyd are common proposals.

The belief that Shakespeare may have written very little of 1 Henry VI first came from Edmond Malone in his 1790 edition of Shakespeare's plays, which included A Dissertation on the Three Parts of King Henry VI, in which he argued that the large number of classical allusions in the play was more characteristic of Nashe, Peele, or Greene than of early Shakespeare. Malone also argued that the language itself indicated someone other than Shakespeare. This view was dominant until 1929, when Peter Alexander challenged it. Since then, scholars have remained divided on the issue. In 1944, E. M. W. Tillyard argued that Shakespeare most likely wrote the entire play; in 1952, John Dover Wilson claimed Shakespeare wrote little of it.

In perhaps the most exhaustive analysis of the debate, the 1995 article, "Shakespeare and Others: The Authorship of Henry the Sixth, Part One", Gary Taylor suggests that approximately 18.7% of the play (3,846 out of 20,515 words) was written by Shakespeare. Taylor argues that Nashe almost certainly wrote all of Act 1, but he attributes to Shakespeare 2.4, 4.2, 4.3, 4.4., 4.5, 4.6, and 4.7 through line 32. Taylor also suggests that the Temple Garden scene (2.4), in which the rival factions identify themselves through the selection of red and white roses, may have been a later addition. Scenes 4.5 to 4.7 include a series of rhyming couplets between Talbot and his son (4.5.15–4.7.50), which, while unusual to modern ears, apparently had "an electric effect upon early audiences." Traditionally, these lines have often been pinpointed as one of the most obviously non-Shakespearean sections of the play. Roger Warren, for instance, argues that these scenes are written in a language "so banal they must be non-Shakespearean."

Other than Taylor, however, several other critics also disagree with Warren's assessment of the quality of the language, arguing that the passages are more complex and accomplished than has hitherto been allowed for. Michael Taylor, for example, argues that "the rhyming dialogue between the Talbots – often stichomythic – shapes a kind of noble flyting match, a competition as to who can out-oblige the other." Similarly, Alexander Leggatt argues that the passages are a perfect blend of form and content: "The relentless click-click of the rhymes reinforces the point that for John Talbot, all arguments are arguments for death; as every other line ending is countered by a rhyme, so every argument Talbot gives John to flee becomes an argument for staying." Taylor and Leggatt are here arguing that the passages are more accomplished than most critics tend to give them credit for, thus offering a counter-argument to the theory that they are so poorly written, they could not possibly be by Shakespeare. In this sense, his failure to use couplets elsewhere in a tragic passage can thus be attributed to an aesthetic choice on his part, rather than offered as evidence of co-authorship.

Other scenes in the play have also been identified as offering possible evidence of co-authorship. For example, the opening lines of Act 1, Scene 2 have been argued to show clear evidence of Nashe's hand. The scene begins with Charles proclaiming, "Mars his true moving – even as in the heavens/So in the earth – to this day is not known" (I.ii.1–2). Some critics believe that this statement is paraphrased in Nashe's later pamphlet Have with You to Saffron-Walden (1596), which contains the line, "You are as ignorant as the astronomers are in the true movings of Mars, which to this day, they never could attain to." The problem with this theory however, as Michael Hattaway has pointed out, is that there is no reason as to why Nashe could not simply be paraphrasing a play he had no involvement in—a common practice in Elizabethan literature. Shakespeare and Marlowe, for example, often paraphrased each other's plays.

Nasheeb Sheehan offers more evidence, again suggestive of Nashe, when Alençon compares the English to "Samsons and Goliases" (I.ii.33). The word 'Golias', Sheehan argues, is unusual insofar as all bibles in Shakespeare's day spelt the name 'Goliath'; it was only in much older editions of the Bible that it was spelt 'Golias'. Sheehan concludes that the use of the arcane spelling is more indicative of Nashe, who was prone to using older spellings of certain words, than Shakespeare, who was less likely to do so.

However, evidence of Shakespeare's authorship has also been found within the play. For example, Samuel Johnson argued that the play was more competently written than King John, Richard II, 1 Henry IV, 2 Henry IV and Henry V, and, therefore, not attributing it to Shakespeare based on quality made little sense. A similar point is made by Lawrence V. Ryan, who suggests that the play fits so well into Shakespeare's overall style, with an intricate integration of form and content, that it was most likely written by him alone.

Another aspect of the debate is the actual likelihood of Shakespeare collaborating at all. Some critics, such as Hattaway and Cairncross, argue that it is unlikely that a young, up-and-coming dramatist trying to make a name for himself would have collaborated with other authors so early in his career. On the other hand, Michael Taylor suggests "it is not difficult to construct an imaginary scenario that has a harassed author calling on friends and colleagues to help him construct an unexpectedly commissioned piece in a hurry."

Another argument that challenges the co-authorship idea is that the basic theory of co-authorship was originally hypothesized in the 18th and 19th centuries due to a distaste for the treatment of Joan. Critics were uncomfortable attributing such a harsh depiction to Shakespeare, so they embraced the co-authorship theory to "clear his name", suggesting that he could not have been responsible for the merciless characterization. Harvard University English literature professor Herschel Baker noted in his introduction to Henry VI for The Riverside Shakespeare (1974; p. 587) how appalled William Warburton was by the depiction of Joan, and that Edmond Malone sought in "Dissertation on the Three Parts of Henry VI" (1787) to prove Shakespeare had no hand its authorship.

As with the question of the order in which the trilogy was written, twentieth century editors and scholars remain staunchly divided on the question of authorship. Edward Burns, for example, in his 2000 edition of the play for the Arden Shakespeare 3rd series, suggests that it is highly unlikely that Shakespeare wrote alone, and, throughout his introduction and commentary, he refers to the writer not as Shakespeare but as 'the dramatists'. He also suggests that the play should be more properly called Harry VI, by Shakespeare, Nashe and others. Burns' predecessor however, Andrew S. Cairncross, editor of the play for the Arden Shakespeare 2nd series in 1962, ascribes the entire play to Shakespeare, as does Lawrence V. Ryan in his 1967 Signet Classic Shakespeare edition, and Michael Hattaway in his New Cambridge Shakespeare edition of 1990. In his 1952 edition of the play, Dover Wilson, on the other hand, argued that the play was almost entirely written by others, and that Shakespeare actually had little to do with its composition. Speaking during a 1952 radio presentation of The Contention and True Tragedy, which he produced, Dover Wilson argued that he had not included 1 Henry VI because it is a "patchwork in which Shakespeare collaborated with inferior dramatists."

On the other hand, Michael Taylor believes that Shakespeare almost certainly wrote the entire play, as does J. J. M. Tobin, who, in his essay in Henry VI: Critical Essays (2001), argues the similarities to Nashe do not reveal the hand of Nashe at work in the composition of the play, but instead reveal Shakespeare imitating Nashe. More recently, in 2005, Paul J. Vincent has re-examined the question in light of recent research into the Elizabethan theatre, concluding that 1 Henry VI is Shakespeare's partial revision of a play by Nashe (Act 1) and an unknown playwright (Acts 2–5) and that it was the original, non-Shakespearean play that was first performed on 3 March 1592. Shakespeare's work in the play, which was most likely composed in 1594, can be found in Act 2 (scene 4) and Act 4 (scenes 2–5 and the first 32 lines of scene 7). In 2007, Vincent's authorship findings, especially with regard to Nashe's authorship of Act 1, were supported overall by Brian Vickers, who agrees with the theory of co-authorship and differs only slightly over the extent of Shakespeare's contribution to the play.

In 2016, Oxford University Press announced that it would credit Christopher Marlowe as co-author alongside Shakespeare for all three Henry VI plays in its New Oxford Shakespeare series. In the New Oxford Shakespeare, 1 Henry VI was specifically credited as being written by "Christopher Marlowe, Thomas Nashe, and Anonymous, adapted by William Shakespeare". In opposition, Brian Vickers and Darren Freebury-Jones have argued in favor of Thomas Kyd as Nashe's co-author.

=== Language ===
The very functioning of language itself is literally a theme in the play, with particular emphasis placed on its ability to represent by means of signs (semiosis), the power of language to sway, the aggressive potential of language, the failure of language to adequately describe reality and the manipulation of language so as to hide the truth.

The persuasive power of language is first alluded to by Charles, who tells Joan after she has assured him she can end the siege of Orléans, "Thou hast astonished me with thy high terms" (1.2.93). This sense is repeated when the Countess of Auvergne is wondering about Talbot and says to her servant, "Great is the rumour of this dreadful knight,/And his achievements of no less account./Fain would mine eyes be witness with mine ears,/To give their censure of these rare reports" (2.3.7–10). Like Charles, Auvergne has been astonished with the 'high terms' bestowed on Talbot, and now she wishes to see if the report and the reality conflate. Later in the play, the persuasive power of language becomes important for Joan, as she uses it as a subterfuge to sneak into Rouen, telling her men, "Be wary how you place your words;/Talk like the vulgar sort of market men/That come to gather money for their corn" (3.2.3.5). Later, she uses language to persuade Burgundy to join with the Dauphin against the English. As Burgundy realises he is succumbing to her rhetoric, he muses to himself, "Either she hath bewitched me with her words,/Or nature makes me suddenly relent" (3.3.58–59). Here, language is shown to be so powerful as to act on Burgundy the same way Nature itself would act, to the point where he is unsure if he has been persuaded by a natural occurrence or by Joan's words. Language is thus presented as capable of transforming ideology. As Joan finishes her speech, Burgundy again attests to the power of her language, "I am vanquish'd. These haughty words of hers/Have battered me like roaring canon-shot,/And made me almost yield upon my knees" (3.3.78–80). Later, something similar happens with Henry, who agrees to marry Margaret merely because of Suffolk's description of her. In a line that echoes Burgundy's, Henry queries what it is that has prompted him to agree to Suffolk's suggestion: "Whether it be through force of your report,/My noble lord of Suffolk, or for that/My tender youth was never yet attaint/With any passion of inflaming love, I cannot tell" (5.6.79–83). Here, again, the power of language is shown to be so strong as to be confused with a natural phenomenon.

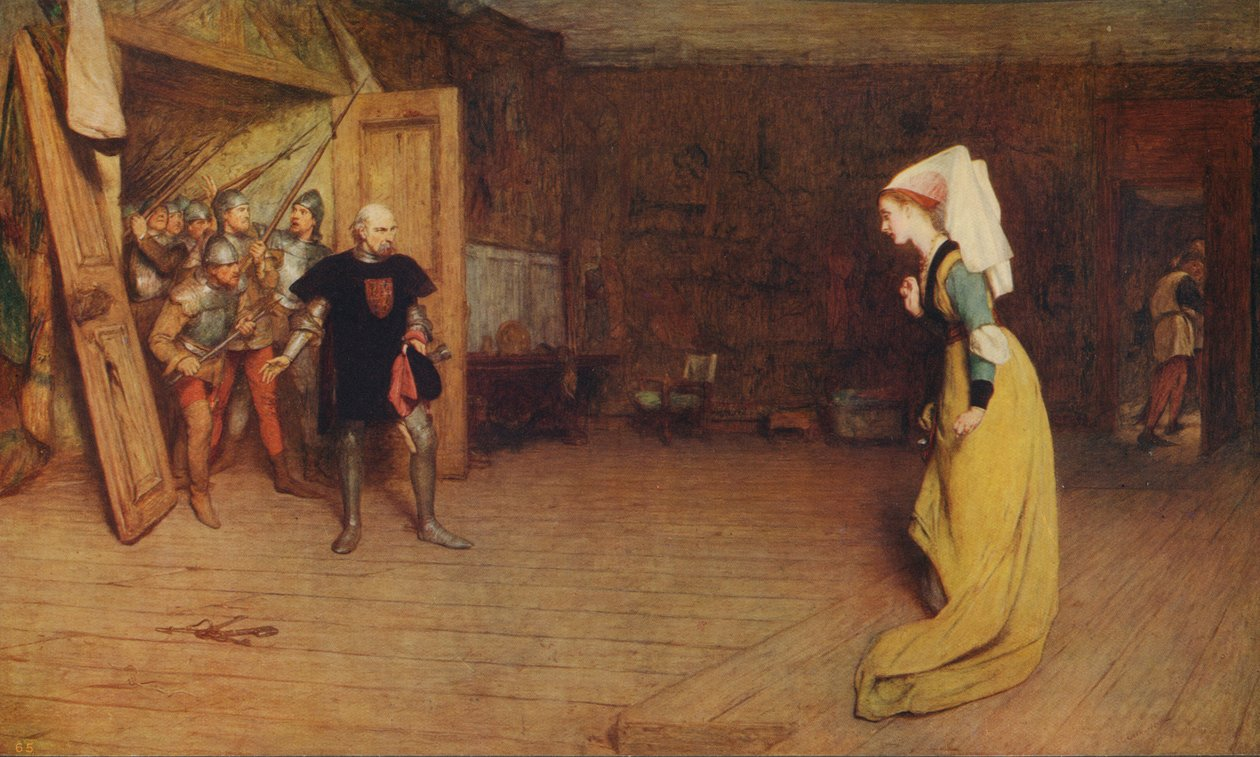
Talbot and the Countess of Auvergne by William Quiller Orchardson

Language can also be employed aggressively. For example, after the death of Salisbury, when Talbot first hears about Joan, he contemptuously refers to her and Charles as "Puzel or pussel, dolphin or dogfish" (1.5.85). In French, 'puzel' means slut, and 'pussel' is a variation of 'pucelle' (meaning virgin), but with an added negative connotation. These two words, 'puzel' and 'pussel', are both puns on Joan's name (Pucelle), thus showing Talbot's utter contempt for her. (Note: See Burns (2000: 25–27, 156 and 287–298) for discussions of the multiple connotations of Joan's name, which may also include 'pizzle', an Elizabethan word for the penis. Burns argues that the obvious contradiction raised by Joan's name referring to both a whore and a virgin, as well as male genitalia, coupled with the fact that her female identity is questioned several times in the play, are all part of her complex characterisation, wherein she remains protean, never one thing for very long. Another example of this is the contrast between her representation by the French as a saint and by the English as a demon.) Similarly, the use of the word 'dolphin' to describe the Dauphin carries negative and mocking connotations, as does the use of the word 'dogfish', a member of the shark family considered dishonourable scavengers, preying on anything and anyone. Again, Talbot is showing his contempt for Charles' position by exposing it to mockery with some simple word play. (Note: This particular line has created a great deal of controversy amongst editors of the play. In terms of Joan, some editors refer to her as 'Joan la Pucelle' (such as Michael Taylor), whilst others (such as Edward Burns) use the form 'Joan Puzel' (although he refers to the historical Joan in his introduction as 'Jean la Pucelle'). The First Folio referred to her as 'Ioane de Puzel'. In his version of 1.5.85, Burns follows the First Folio, which reads "puzel or pussel", as opposed to Taylor's "puzzel or pucelle." A similar problem arises with relation to the Dauphin. In the First Folio, every occurrence of the word 'Dauphin' is in the form 'Dolphin'. Again, Burns follows the First Folio here, although most 20th-century editors tend to change the form to 'Dauphin' (with the exception of 1.5.85). Michael Taylor argues that using the form 'dolphin' everywhere except 1.5.85 means that the pun in Talbot's line is rendered meaningless. Similarly, H.C. Hart, in his 1909 edition of the play for the 1st series of the Arden Shakespeare, used the form 'Dauphin' throughout, but at 1.5.85 he argued, "Dolphin of the Folio must be considerately allowed to stand in the text here for the sake of the quibbling." For more information on the various forms of Joan's name and Charles' title, see Appendix 1 in Burns (2000: 287–297)) Other examples of words employed aggressively are seen when the English reclaim Orléans, and a soldier chases the half-dressed French leaders from the city, declaring "The cry of 'Talbot' serves me for a sword,/For I have loaden me with many spoils,/Using no other weapon but his name" (2.1.81–83). A similar notion is found when the Countess of Auvergne meets Talbot, and muses, "Is this the Talbot so much feared abroad/That with his name the mothers still their babes" (2.3.15–16). Here words (specifically Talbot's name) literally become weapons, and are used directly to strike fear into the enemy.

However although words are occasionally shown to be powerful and deeply persuasive, they also often fail in their signifying role, exposed as incapable of adequately representing reality. This idea is introduced by Gloucester at Henry V's funeral, where he laments that words cannot encompass the life of such a great king: "What should I say? His deeds exceed all speech" (1.1.15). Later, when Gloucester and Winchester confront one another outside the Tower of London, Gloucester champions the power of real action over the power of threatening words: "I will not answer thee with words but blows" (1.3.69). Similarly, after the French capture Rouen and refuse to meet the English army in the battlefield, Bedford asserts, "O let no words, but deeds, revenge this treason" (3.2.48). Another example of the failure of language is found when Suffolk finds himself lost for words whilst attempting to woo Margaret: "Fain would I woo her, yet I dare not speak./I'll call for pen and ink and write my mind./Fie, de la Pole, disable not thyself!/Hast not a tongue?" (5.4.21–24). Later, Joan's words, so successful during the play in convincing others to support her, explicitly fail to save her life, as she is told by Warwick, "Strumpet, thy words condemn thy brat and thee./Use no entreaty, for it is in vain" (5.5.84–85).

Language as a system is also shown to be open to manipulation. Words can be employed for deceptive purposes, as the representative function of language gives way to deceit. For example, shortly after Charles has accepted Joan as his new commander, Alençon calls into question her sincerity, thus suggesting a possible discrepancy between her words and her actions; "These women are shrewd tempters with their tongues" (1.2.123). Another example occurs when Henry forces Winchester and Gloucester to put aside their animosity and shake hands. Their public words here stand in diametric opposition to their private intentions;

WINCHESTER
Well, Duke of Gloucester, I will yield to thee
Love for thy love, and hand for hand I give.

He takes Gloucester's hand

GLOUCESTER
(aside) Ay, but I fear me with a hollow heart.
(to others) See here, my friends and loving countrymen,
This token serveth for a flag of truce
Betwixt ourselves and all our followers.
So help me God as I dissemble not.

WINCHESTER
So help me God. (aside) As I intend it not.

(3.1.136–143)

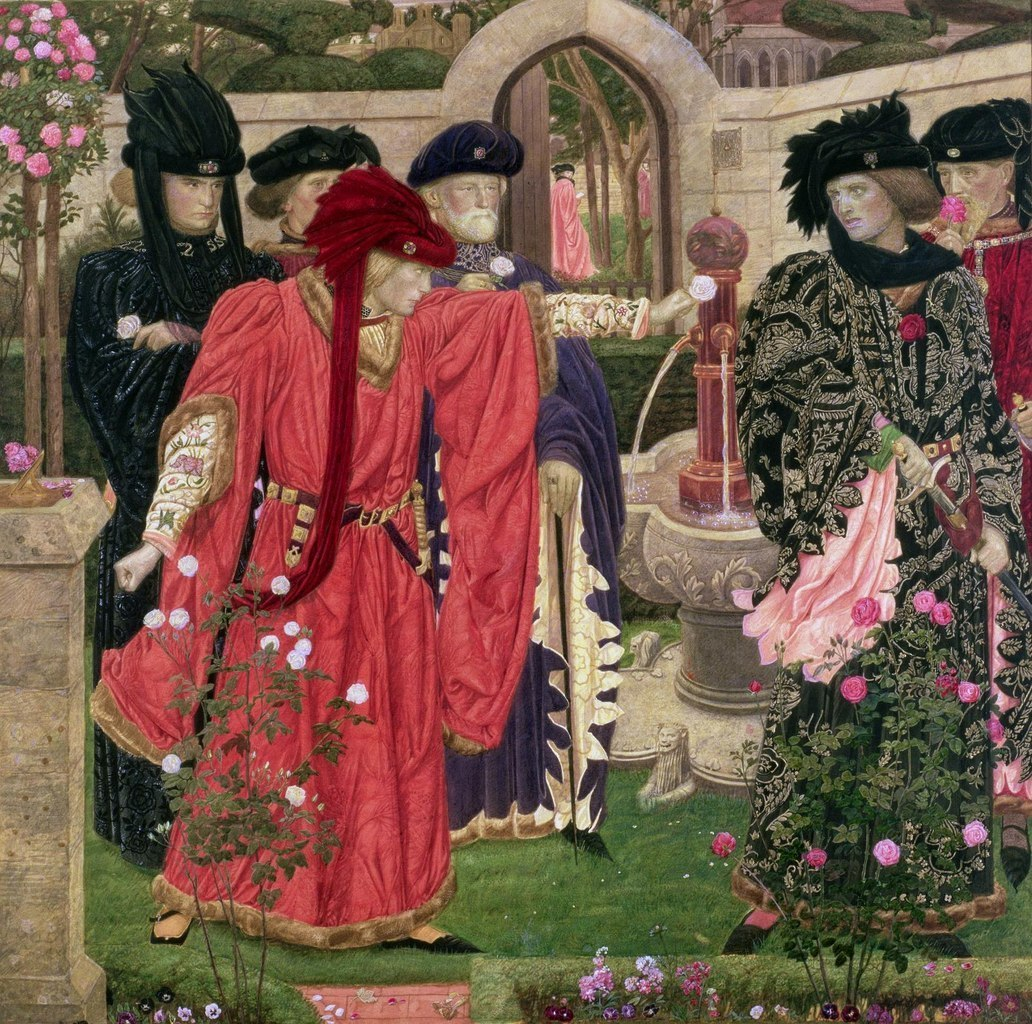
Plucking the Red and White Roses in the Old Temple Gardens by Henry Payne (1908)

Act 2, Scene 4 is perhaps the most important scene in the play in terms of language, as it is in this scene where Richard introduces the notion of what he calls "dumb significants," something that carries resonance throughout the trilogy. During his debate with Somerset, Richard points out to the lords who are unwilling to openly support either of them, "Since you are tongue tied and loath to speak,/In dumb significants proclaim your thoughts."(ll.25–26) The dumb significants he refers to are roses—a red rose to join Somerset, a white rose to join Richard. As such, the roses essentially function as symbols, replacing the very need for language. Once all the lords select their roses, these symbolize the houses they represent. Henry chooses a red rose—totally unaware of the implications of his actions, as he does not understand the power the "dumb significants" have.

He places his trust in a more literal type of language, and thus selects a rose in what he thinks is a meaningless gesture—but that does in fact have profound implications. Henry's mistake results directly from his failure to grasp the importance of silent actions and symbolic decisions; "a gesture—especially such an ill-considered one—is worth and makes worthless, a thousand pretty words."

=== Themes ===
==== Death of chivalry ====
A fundamental theme in the play is the death of chivalry, "the decline of England's empire over France and the accompanying decay of the ideas of feudalism that had sustained the order of the realm." This is specifically manifested in the character of Talbot, the symbol of a dying breed of men honourably and selflessly devoted to the good of England, whose methods and style of leadership represent the last dying remnants of a now outmoded, feudal gallantry. As such, Michael Taylor refers to him as "the representative of a chivalry that was fast decaying," whilst Michael Hattaway sees him as "a figure for the nostalgia that suffuses the play, a dream of simple chivalric virtus like that enacted every year at Elizabeth's Accession Day tilts, a dream of true empire. He is designed to appeal to a popular audience, and his death scene where he calls for troops who do not appear is yet another demonstration of the destructiveness of aristocratic factionalism."

One of the clearest examples of Talbot's adherence to the codes of chivalry is seen in his response to Fastolf's desertion from the battlefield. As far as Talbot is concerned, Fastolf's actions reveal him as a dishonourable coward who places self-preservation above self-sacrifice, and thus he represents everything wrong with the modern knight. This is in direct contrast to the chivalry that Talbot represents, a chivalry he remembers fondly from days gone by:

TALBOT
I vowed, base knight, when I did meet thee next,
To tear the garter from thy craven's leg,
Which I have done because unworthily
Thou wast install'd in that high degree. –
Pardon me, princely Henry, and the rest.
This dastard, at the Battle of Patay,
When but in all I was six thousand strong,
And that the French were almost ten to one,
Before we met, or that a stroke was given,
Like to a trusty squire did run away;
In which assault we lost twelve hundred men.
Myself and divers gentlemen beside
Were there surprised and taken prisoners.
Then judge, great lords, if I have done amiss,
Or whether that such cowards ought to wear
This ornament of knighthood: yea or no?

GLOUCESTER
To say the truth, this fact was infamous
And ill beseeming any common man,
Much more a knight, a captain, and a leader.

TALBOT
When first this order was ordained, my lords,
Knights of the garter were of noble birth,
Valiant and virtuous, full of haughty courage,
Such as were grown to credit by the wars;
Not fearing death nor shrinking for distress,
But always resolute in most extremes.
He then that is not furnished in this sort
Doth but usurp the sacred name of knight,
Profaning this most honourable order,
And should – if I were worthy to be judge –
Be quite degraded, like a hedge-born swain
That doth presume to boast of gentle blood.

(4.1.14–44)

Talbot's description of Fastolf's actions stands in direct contrast to the image of an ideal knight, and as such, the ideal and the reality serve to highlight one another, and thus reveal the discrepancy between them.

Similarly, just as Talbot uses knights to represent an ideal past, by remembering how they used to be chivalric, so too does Gloucester in relation to Henry V, who he also sees as representing a glorious and honourable past:

England ne're had a king until his time.
Virtue he had, deserving to command;
His brandished sword did bind men with his beams,
His arms spread wider than a dragon's wings,
His sparkling eyes, replete with wrathful fire,
More dazzled and drove back his enemies
Than midday sun fierce bent against their faces.

(1.1.8–14)

Henry V has this function throughout much of the play; "he is presented not as a man but as a rhetorical construct fashioned out of hyperbole, as a heroic image or heraldic icon." He is seen as a representative of a celebrated past that can never be recaptured: "There is in the play a dominant, nostalgic, celebratory reminiscence of Henry V who lives on in the immortality of preternatural legend."

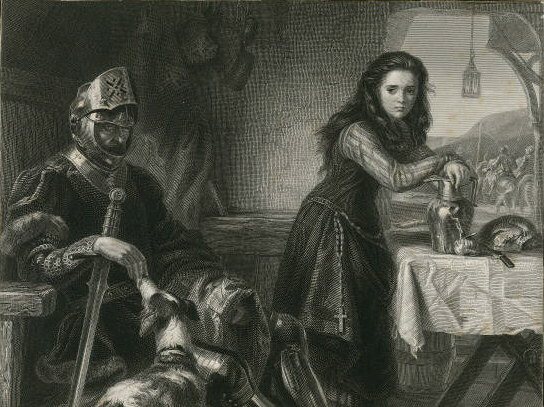
The Maid of Orléans by Henrietta Ward (1871)

The play, however, does not simply depict the fall of one order; it also depicts the rise of another; "How the nation might have remained true to itself is signified by the words and deeds of Talbot. What she is in danger of becoming is signified by the shortcomings of the French, failings that crop up increasingly amongst Englishman [...] also manifest are an English decline towards French effeminacy and the beginnings of reliance upon fraud and cunning rather than manly courage and straightforward manly virtue." If the old mode of honourable conduct is specifically represented by Talbot and Henry V, the new mode of duplicity and Machiavellianism is represented by Joan, who employs a type of warfare with which Talbot is simply unable to cope. This is seen most clearly when she sneaks into Rouen and subsequently refuses to face Talbot in a battle. Talbot finds this kind of behaviour incomprehensible and utterly dishonourable. As such, he finds himself fighting an enemy who uses tactics he is incapable of understanding; with the French using what he sees as unconventional methods, he proves unable to adapt. This represents one of the ironies in the play's depiction of chivalry; it is the very resoluteness of Talbot's honour and integrity, his insistence in preserving an old code abandoned by all others, which ultimately defeats him; his inability to adjust means he becomes unable to function in the newly established 'dishonourable' context. As such, the play is not entirely nostalgic about chivalry; "so often the tenets of chivalry are mocked by word and action. The play is full of moments of punctured aristocratic hauteur."

Talbot's mode of chivalry is replaced by politicians concerned only with themselves and their own advancement: Winchester, Somerset, Suffolk, even Richard. As Jane Howell, director of the BBC Shakespeare adaptation argues, "what I was concerned about in the first play [...] was that for a long time, the code of the people had been chivalry. But with the death of Talbot, one starts to see a demise of chivalry." Narcissistic political infighting has supplanted self-sacrificing patriotism and chivalry: "the play charts the disastrous breakdown of civility among the English nobility." Nobles concerned with personal power above all else have replaced knights concerned only with the empire. As such, by the end of the play, both Talbot and his son lay dead, as does the notion of English chivalry. In this sense then, the play "depicts the deaths of the titanic survivors of an ancien régime."

==== Patriotism ====
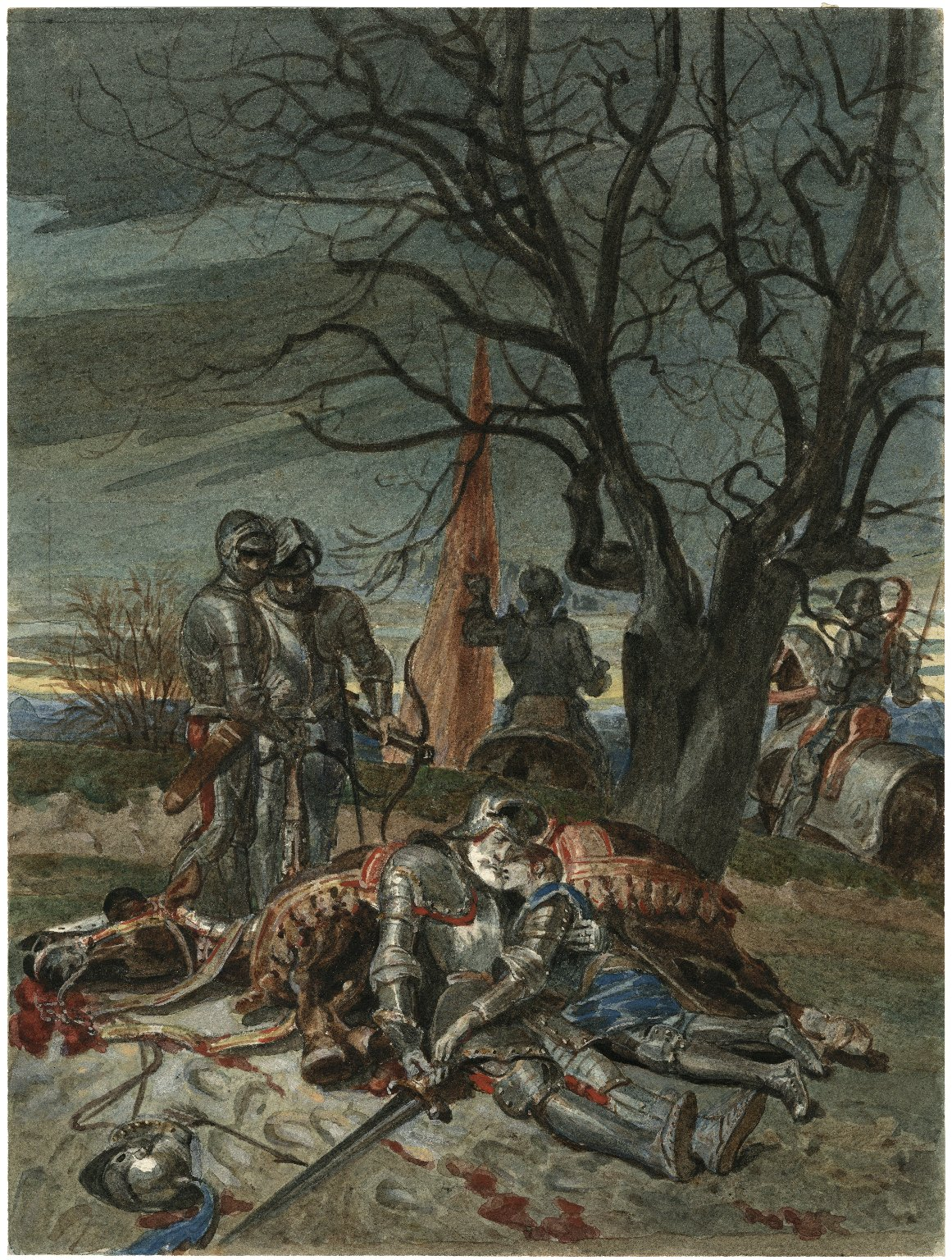
The death of Lord Talbot and his son, John by Alexandre Bida (19th century).

Hand-in-hand with the examination of chivalry with which the play engages is an examination of patriotism. Indeed, some critics argue that patriotism provided the impetus for the play in the first place. England defeated the Spanish Armada in 1588, leading to a short-lived period of international confidence and patriotic pride—but by 1590, the national mood was one of despondency, and as such, 1 Henry VI may have been commissioned to help dispel this mood: "The patriotic emotions to which this play shamelessly appeals resonate at an especially fragile time politically speaking. Frightening memories of the 1588 Spanish Armada, or of the Babington Plot of 1586, which led to the execution of Mary, Queen of Scots; concerns over a noticeably declining and still unmarried Queen Elizabeth; worries over Catholic recusancy; fear of military involvement in Europe, and, just as disquietingly, in Ireland, combine to make a patriotic response a matter of some urgency. [The play] is a bracing attempt to stiffen the sinews of the English in a time of danger and deceit."

Evidence of this is seen throughout. For example, the English seem vastly outnumbered in every battle, yet they never give up, and often they prove victorious. Indeed, even when they do lose, the suggestion is often made that it was because of treachery, as only by duplicitous means could their hardiness be overcome. For example, during the Battle of Patay (where Talbot is captured), the messenger reports,

The tenth of August last, this dreadful lord [i.e. Talbot],
Retiring from the siege of Orléans,
Having full scarce six thousand in his troop,
By three-and-twenty thousand of the French
Was round encompass'd and set upon:
No leisure had he to enrank his men.
He wanted pikes to set before his archers;
Instead whereof sharp stakes plucked out of hedges
They pitch'd in the ground confusedly
To keep the horsemen off from breaking in.
More than three hours the fight continu'd,
Where valiant Talbot, above human thought,
Enacted wonders with his sword and lance.
Hundreds he sent to hell, and none durst stand him;
Here, there, and everywhere, enraged he slew.
The French exclaimed the devil was in arms:
All the whole army stood agazed on him.
His soldiers, spying his undaunted spirit,
'À Talbot! À Talbot!' cried out amain,
And rushed into the bowels of the battle.
Here had the conquest fully been sealed up
If Sir John Fastolf had not played the coward.
He, being in the vanguard placed behind,
With purpose to relieve and follow them,
Cowardly fled, not having struck one stroke.
Hence flew the general wrack and massacre;
Enclos'd were they with their enemies.
A base Walloon, to win the Dauphin's grace,
Thrust Talbot with a spear into the back –
Whom all France, with their chief assembled strength,
Durst not presume to look once in the face.

(1.1.108–140)

Here Fastolf's betrayal is the direct cause of the English defeat, not the fact that they were outnumbered ten-to-one, that they were hit by a surprise attack or that they were surrounded. This notion is returned to several times, with the implication each time that only treachery can account for an English defeat. For example, upon hearing of the first loss of towns in France, Exeter immediately asks, "How were they lost? What treachery was used?" (1.1.68). Upon losing Rouen, Talbot exclaims, "France, thou shalt rue this treason with thy tears/If Talbot but survive thy treachery" (3.2.35–36). Later, when thinking back on the French campaign, Richard asks Henry, "Have we not lost most part of all the towns/By treason, falsehood and by treachery" (5.5.108–109).

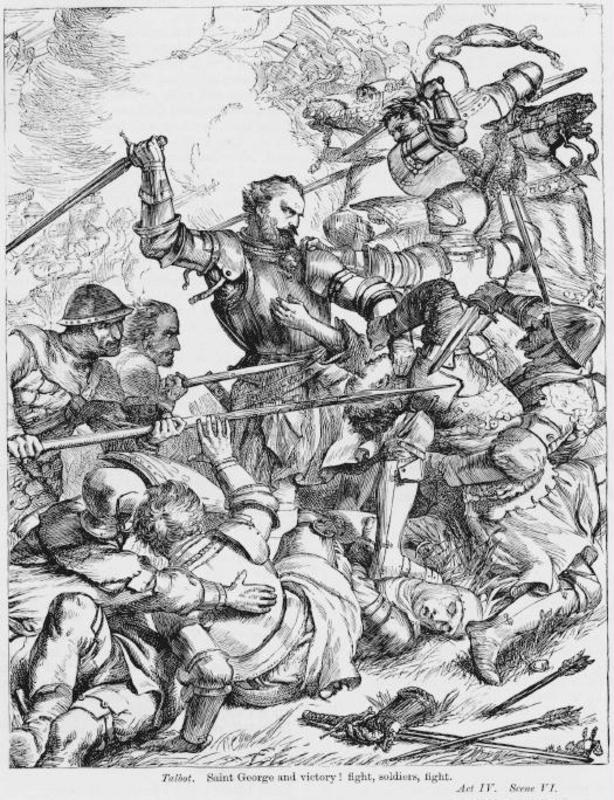
H. C. Selous's illustration of Talbot engaging in battle in Act 4, Scene 6; from The Plays of William Shakespeare: The Historical Plays, edited by Charles Cowden Clarke and Mary Cowden Clarke (1830)

However, if the English are of the mind that they can only be defeated by treachery and betrayal, the play also presents the French as somewhat in awe of them, bearing a begrudging respect for them, and fearing their strength in battle. As such, whilst the English attribute every defeat to treachery, the French opinion of the English seems to imply that perhaps this is indeed the only way to beat them. For example, during the siege of Orléans:

ALENÇON
Froissart, a countryman of ours, records
England all Olivers and Rolands bred
During the time Edward the Third did reign.
More truly now may this be verified,
For none but Samsons and Goliases
It sendeth forth to skirmish. One to ten?
Lean raw-boned rascals – who would e'er suppose
They had such courage and audacity.

CHARLES
Let's leave this town, for they are hare-brained slaves,
And hunger will enforce them to be more eager.
Of old I know them; rather with their teeth
The walls they'll tear down than forsake the siege.

REIGNIER
I think by some odd gimmers or device
Their arms are set, like clocks, still to strike on,
Else n'er could they hold out as they do.

(1.2.29-44)

As such, the play presents, to a certain extent, the English image of themselves as somewhat in line with the French image of them, with both stressing resoluteness and steadfastness.

Another component of the patriotic sentiment is the religious note the play often strikes. On the whole, everything Catholic is represented as bad, everything Protestant is represented as good: "The play's popularity [in 1592] has to be seen against the backdrop of an extraordinary efflorescence of interest in political history in the last two decades of the sixteenth century fed by self-conscious patriotic Protestantism's fascination with its own biography in history. It is not for nothing that Part One is persistently anti-Catholic in a number of ways despite the fact that in the fifteenth century the entire population of England was nominally Catholic (though not, of course, in 1592). The French are presented as decadently Catholic, the English (with the exception of the Bishop of Winchester) as attractively Protestant." Talbot himself is an element of this, insofar as his "rhetoric is correspondingly Protestant. His biblical references are all from the Old Testament (a source less fully used by Catholics) and speak of stoicism and individual faith." Henry V is also cited as an example of Protestant purity: "He was a king blest of the King of Kings./Unto the French the dreadful judgement day/So dreadful will not be as was his sight./The battles of the Lords of Hosts he fought" (1.1.28–31). "King of kings" is a phrase used in 1 Timothy, 6:15. "Lords of Hosts" is used throughout the Old Testament, and to say Henry fought for the Lord of Hosts is to compare him to the warrior king, David, who also fought for the Lords of Hosts in 1 Samuel, 25:28.

However, despite the obvious celebratory patriotic tone and sense of Protestant/English religio-political identity, as with the lamentation for the death of chivalry, the play is somewhat ambiguous in its overall depiction of patriotism. Ultimately, the play depicts how the English lost France, a seemingly strange subject matter if Shakespeare was attempting to instil a sense of national pride in the people. This is rendered even more so when one considers that Shakespeare could have written about how England won France in the first place: "The popularity of "Armada rhetoric" during the time of 1 Henry VI's composition would have seemed to ask for a play about Henry V, not one which begins with his death and proceeds to dramatise English loses." In this sense then, the depiction of patriotism, although undoubtedly strong, is not without ambiguity; the very story told by the play renders any patriotic sentiment found within to be something of a hollow victory.

==== Saintly vs. demonic ====
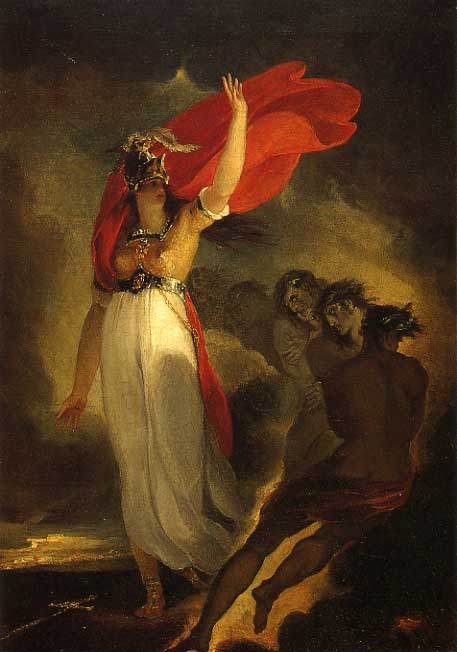
Joan and the Furies by William Hamilton (1790)

Demons, spirits, witches, saints and God are all mentioned on numerous occasions within the play, often relating directly to Joan, who is presented as "a fascinating mixture of saint, witch, naïve girl, clever woman, audacious warrior and sensual tart." The English continually refer to her as a witch and a whore, the French as a saint and a saviour, and the play itself seems to waver between these two poles: "Joan first appears in a state of beatitude, patient, serene, the "Divinest creature" of Charles' adoration, the object of the Virgin Mary's miraculous intercession, chosen by her to rescue France, and so made beautiful, courageous and wise [...] on the other hand, and virtually at the same time, she's clearly an early combination of the demonic, the Machiavellian, and the Marlovian."

Joan is introduced into the play by the Bastard, who, even before anyone has seen or met her, says, "A holy maid hither with me I bring" (1.2.51). Later, after Joan has helped the French lift the siege of Orléans, Charles declares, "No longer on Saint Denis will we cry, but Joan la Pucelle shall be France's saint" (1.7.28–30). Similarly, when Joan reveals her plan to turn Burgundy against the English, Alençon declares, "We'll set thy statue in some holy place/And have thee reverenced like a blessed saint" (3.3.14–15).

On the other hand, however, the English see her as a demon. Prior to her combat with Talbot, he exclaims, "Devil or devil's dam, I'll conjure thee./Blood will I draw on thee – thou art a witch –/And straightway give thy soul to him thou serv'st" (1.6.5–7). Then, after the fight, he says, "My thoughts are whirl'd like a potter's wheel./I know not where I am nor what I do./A witch, by fear, not force, like Hannibal,/Drives back our troops and conquers as she lists" (1.6.19–22). Upon arriving in France, Bedford condemns Charles for aligning himself with Joan: "How much he wrongs his fame,/Despairing of his own arms' fortitude,/To join with witches and the help of hell" (2.1.16–18). Talbot responds to this with, "Well, let them practice and converse with spirits./God is our fortress" (2.1.25–26). Later, Talbot refers to her as "Pucelle, that witch, that damn'd sorceress" (3.2.37) and "Foul fiend of France, and hag of all despite" (3.2.51), declaring "I speak not to that railing Hecate" (3.2.64). Prior to executing her, York also calls her a "Fell banning hag" (5.2.42).

Joan herself addresses this issue as she is about to be executed:

First let me tell you whom you have condemned:
Not me begotten of a shepherd swain,
But issued from the progeny of kings;
Virtuous and holy, chosen from above
By inspiration of celestial grace
To work exceeding miracles on earth.
I never had to do with wicked spirits;
But you, that are polluted with your lusts,
Stained with the guiltless blood of innocents,
Corrupt and tainted with a thousand vices –
Because you want the grace that others have,
You judge it straight a thing impossible
To compass wonders but by help of devils.
No, misconceiv'd, Joan of Arc hath been
A virgin from her tender infancy,
Chaste and immaculate in very thought,
Whose maiden blood, thus rigorously effused,
Will cry for vengeance at the gates of heaven.

(5.5.36–53)

Having failed in her efforts to convince the English she is a holy virgin, and that killing her will invoke the wrath of heaven, she alters her story and claims she is pregnant, hoping they will spare her for the sake of the child. She then lists off various French nobles who could be her child's father in an effort to find one whom the English respect. In this sense then, Joan leaves the play as neither saintly nor demonic, but as a frightened woman pleading fruitlessly for her life.

An important question in any examination of Joan is the question of whether or not she is a unified, stable character who vacillates from saintly to demonic, or a poorly constructed character, now one thing, now the other. According to Edward Burns, "Joan cannot be read as a substantive realist character, a unified subject with a coherent singly identity."

Michael Hattaway offers an alternate, sympathetic view of Joan that argues that the character's movement from saintly to demonic is justified within the text: "Joan is the play's tragic figure, comparable with Faulconbridge in King John. She turns to witchcraft only in despair; it cannot be taken as an unequivocal manifestation of diabolic power."

Another theory is that Joan is actually a comic figure, and the huge alterations in her character are supposed to evoke laughter. Michael Taylor, for example, argues, "A fiendish provenance replaces a divine one in [Act 5, Scene 3], a scene that reduces Joan to a comic, bathetic dependency on shifty representatives of the underworld." In line with this thinking, it is worth pointing out that in the 1981 BBC Television Shakespeare adaptation, Joan, and the French in general, are treated predominantly as comic figures. Joan (Brenda Blethyn), Alençon (Michael Byrne), the Bastard (Brian Protheroe), Reignier (David Daker) and Charles (Ian Saynor) are treated as buffoons for the most part, and there is no indication of any malevolence (significantly, when Joan's fiends abandon her, we never see them, we simply see her talking to empty air). Examples of the comic treatment of the characters are found during the battle of Orléans, where Joan is ludicrously depicted as defending the city from the entire English army single-handed, whilst Talbot stands by incredulously watching his soldiers flee one after another. Another example appears in Act 2, Scene 1, as the five of them blame one another for the breach in the watch at Orléans that allowed the English back into the city. Their role as comic figures is also shown in Act 3, Scene 2. After Joan has entered Rouen and the others stand outside waiting for her signal, Charles is shown sneaking through a field holding a helmet with a large plume up in front of his face in an effort to hide.

The notion of demonic agency and saintly power, however, is not confined to Joan. For example, in the opening conversation of the play, speculating as to how Talbot could have been taken prisoner, Exeter exclaims "shall we think the subtle-witted French/Conjurers and sorcerers, that, afraid of him,/By magic verse have contrived his end" (1.1.25–27). Later, discussing the French capture of Orléans, Talbot claims it was "contrived by art and baleful sorcery" (2.1.15). Indeed, the French make similar claims about the English. During the Battle of Patay for example, according to the messenger, "The French exclaimed the devil was in arms" (1.1.125). Later, as the English attack Orléans,

BASTARD
I think this Talbot be a fiend of hell.

REIGNIER
If not of hell, the heavens sure favour him.

(2.1.47–48)

Here, much as the English had done when they were being defeated by Joan, the French attribute diabolic power to their vanquishers. Unlike the English however, the French acknowledge that Talbot must be either a demon or a saint. As far as the English are concerned, Joan is demonic, it is not open to question.

== Performance ==
Poster from Michael Boyd's 2000 production

After the original 1592 performances, the complete text of 1 Henry VI seems to have been rarely acted. The first definite performance after Shakespeare's day was on 13 March 1738 at Covent Garden, in what seems to have been a stand-alone performance, as there is no record of a performance of either 2 Henry VI or 3 Henry VI. The next certain performance in England did not occur until 1906, when F.R. Benson presented the play at the Shakespeare Memorial Theatre in a production of Shakespeare's two tetralogies, performed over eight nights. As far as can be ascertained, this was not only the first performance of the octology, but was also the first definite performance of both the tetralogy and the trilogy. Benson himself played Henry and his wife, Constance Benson, played Margaret.

In 1953, Douglas Seale directed a production of 1 Henry VI at the Birmingham Repertory Theatre, following successful productions of 2 Henry VI in 1951 and 3 Henry VI in 1952. All three plays starred Paul Daneman as Henry and Rosalind Boxall as Margaret, with 1 Henry VI featuring Derek Godfrey as Talbot and Judi Dench as Joan.

A 1977 production at the Royal Shakespeare Theatre made much of its unedited status. Terry Hands presented all three Henry VI plays with Alan Howard as Henry and Helen Mirren as Margaret. Though the production had only moderate box office success, critics lauded it for Alan Howard's unique portrayal of Henry. Howard adopted historical details concerning the real Henry's madness into his performance, presenting the character as constantly on the brink of a mental and emotional breakdown. Possibly as a reaction to a recent adaptation of the trilogy under the general title Wars of the Roses, which was strongly political, Hands attempted to ensure his own production was entirely apolitical. "Wars of the Roses was a study in power politics: its central image was the conference table, and Warwick, the scheming king-maker, was the central figure. But that's not Shakespeare. Shakespeare goes far beyond politics. Politics is a very shallow science." Aside from Howard and Mirren, the production starred David Swift as Talbot and Charlotte Cornwell as Joan.

Under the direction of Michael Boyd the play was presented at the Swan Theatre in Stratford in 2000, with David Oyelowo as Henry and Keith Bartlett as Talbot. Both Margaret and Joan were played by Fiona Bell (as Joan is burned, Bell symbolically rose from the ashes as Margaret). The play was presented with the five other history plays to form a complete eight-part history cycle under the general title This England: The Histories (the first time the Royal Shakespeare Company (RSC) had ever attempted to stage the eight plays as one sequence). This England: The Histories was revived in 2006, as part of the Complete Works festival at the Courtyard Theatre, with the Henry VI plays again directed by Boyd, and starring Chuk Iwuji as Henry and Keith Bartlett reprising his role as Talbot. Katy Stephens played both Margaret and Joan. When the Complete Works wrapped in March 2007, the history plays remained on stage, under the shorter title The Histories, as part of a two-year thirty-four actor ensemble production. 1 Henry VI was performed under the title Henry VI, Part 1: The War Against France. At the end of the two-year programme, the entire octology was performed over a four-day period under the title The Glorious Moment; Richard II was staged on a Thursday evening, followed by the two Henry IV plays on Friday afternoon and evening, the three Henry VI plays on Saturday (two afternoon performances and one evening performance), and Richard III on Sunday evening.

Boyd's production garnered much attention at the time because of his interpolations and additions to the text. Most notably, Boyd introduced a new character into the trilogy. Called The Keeper, the character never speaks, but upon the death of each major character, the Keeper (played by Edward Clayton in 2000, and by Anthony Bunsee in 2006/2007), wearing all red, would walk onto stage and approach the body. The actor playing the body would then stand up and allow himself to be led off-stage by the figure. The production was also particularly noted for its realistic violence. According to Robert Gore-Langton of the Daily Express, in his review of the original 2000 production, "blood from a severed arm sprayed over my lap. A human liver slopped to the floor by my feet. An eyeball scudded past, then a tongue."

In 2012, the trilogy was staged at Shakespeare's Globe as part of the Globe to Globe Festival, with each play performed by a different Balkans based company and offered as a commentary on the recent history of violence in that region. 1 Henry VI was staged by National Theatre Belgrade, directed by Nikita Milivojević, and starring Hadzi Nenad Maricic as Henry, Nebojša Kundačina as Talbot and Jelena Djulvezan as Joan. In 2013, Nick Bagnall directed another production of the trilogy at the Globe. All three plays were performed each day, beginning at midday, under the overall title Henry VI: Three Plays. 1 Henry VI was performed under the title Henry VI: Harry the Sixth. Each of the plays was edited down to two hours, and the entire trilogy was performed with a cast of fourteen actors. On several specific dates, the plays were performed at the actual locations where some of the original events took place and streamed live to the theatre; "battlefield productions" were staged at Towton (Battle of Towton from 3 Henry VI), Tewkesbury (Battle of Tewkesbury from 3 Henry VI), St Albans Cathedral (First Battle of St Albans from 2 Henry VI and Second Battle of St Albans from 3 Henry VI), and Monken Hadley Common (Battle of Barnet from 3 Henry VI). The production starred Graham Butler as Henry, Mary Doherty as Margaret, Andrew Sheridan as Talbot and Beatriz Romilly as Joan.

Apart from the 1738 performance at Covent Garden (about which nothing is known), there is no evidence of 1 Henry VI having ever been performed as a stand-alone play, unlike both 2 Henry VI (which was initially staged as a single play by Douglas Seale in 1951) and 3 Henry VI (which was staged as a single play by Katie Mitchell in 1994).

Outside the UK, the first major American performance was in 1935 at the Pasadena Playhouse in California, directed by Gilmore Brown, as part of a production of all ten Shakespearean histories (the two tetralogies, preceded by King John and proceeded by Henry VIII).

In Europe, unedited stagings of the play took place at the Weimar Court Theatre in 1857. Directed by Franz von Dingelstedt, it was performed as the sixth part of the octology, with all eight plays staged over a ten-day period. A major production was staged at the Burgtheater in Vienna in 1873, with a celebrated performance from Friedrich Mitterwurzer as Winchester. Jocza Savits directed a production of the tetralogy at the Munich Court Theatre in 1889 and again in 1906. In 1927, Saladin Schmitt presented the unedited octology at the Municipal Theatre in Bochum. Denis Llorca staged the tetralogy as one twelve-hour piece in Carcassonne in 1978 and in Créteil in 1979.

== Adaptations ==
=== Theatrical ===
Evidence for the first adaptation of 1 Henry VI is not found until 1817, when Edmund Kean appeared in J.H. Merivale's Richard Duke of York; or the Contention of York and Lancaster at Drury Lane, which used material from all three Henry VI plays, but removed everything not directly related to York; the play ended with his death, which occurs in Act 1, Scene 4 of 3 Henry VI. Material used from 1 Henry VI includes the Temple Garden scene, the Mortimer scene and the introduction of Margaret.

Following Merivale's example, Robert Atkins adapted all three plays into a single piece for a performance at The Old Vic in 1923 as part of the celebrations for the tercentenary of the First Folio. Guy Martineau played Henry, Esther Whitehouse played Margaret, Ernest Meads played Talbot and Jane Bacon played Joan.

Joan (Katy Stephens) is burned alive in Michael Boyd's 2006 production at the Courtyard Theatre in Stratford upon Avon.

The success of the 1951–53 Douglas Seale stand-alone productions of each of the individual plays in Birmingham prompted him to present the three plays together at the Old Vic in 1957 under the general title The Wars of the Roses. Barry Jackson adapted the text, altering the trilogy into a two-part play. 1 Henry VI and 2 Henry VI were combined (with almost all of 1 Henry VI eliminated) and 3 Henry VI was edited. Seale again directed, with Paul Daneman again appearing as Henry, alongside Barbara Jefford as Margaret. The roles of both Talbot and Joan were removed, and 1 Henry VI was reduced to three scenes – the funeral of Henry V, the Temple Garden scene and the introduction of Margaret.

The production usually credited with establishing the reputation of the play in the modern theatre is John Barton and Peter Hall's 1963/1964 RSC production of the tetralogy, adapted into a three-part series, under the general title The Wars of the Roses, at the Royal Shakespeare Theatre. The first play (entitled simply Henry VI) featured a much shortened version of 1 Henry VI and half of 2 Henry VI (up to the death of Beaufort). The second play (entitled Edward IV) featured the second half of 2 Henry VI and a shortened version of 3 Henry VI, which was followed by a shortened version of Richard III as the third play. In all, 1,450 lines written by Barton were added to 6,000 lines of original Shakespearean material, with a total of 12,350 lines removed. The production starred David Warner as Henry, Peggy Ashcroft as Margaret, Derek Smith as Cade, Clive Morton (later replaced by Clive Swift) as Talbot, and Janet Suzman as Joan. Barton and Hall were both especially concerned that the plays reflect the contemporary political environment, with the civil chaos and breakdown of society depicted in the plays mirrored in the contemporary milieu, by events such as the building of the Berlin Wall in 1961, the Cuban Missile Crisis in 1962 and the assassination of John F. Kennedy in 1963. Hall allowed these events to reflect themselves in the production, arguing that "we live among war, race riots, revolutions, assassinations, and the imminent threat of extinction. The theatre is, therefore, examining fundamentals in staging the Henry VI plays." They were also influenced by politically focused literary theory of the time; both had attended the 1956 London visit of Bertolt Brecht's Berliner Ensemble, both were subscribers to Antonin Artaud's theory of "Theatre of Cruelty", and Hall had read an English translation of Jan Kott's influential Shakespeare Our Contemporary in 1964 prior to its publication in Britain. Both Barton and Hall were also supporters of E. M. W. Tillyard's 1944 book Shakespeare's History Plays, which was still a hugely influential text in Shakespearian scholarship, especially in terms of its argument that Shakespeare in the tetralogy was advancing the Tudor myth.

Another major adaptation was staged in 1987 by the English Shakespeare Company, under the direction of Michael Bogdanov. This touring production opened at the Old Vic, and subsequently toured for two years, performing at, amongst other places, the Panasonic Globe Theatre in Tokyo, Japan (as the inaugural play of the arena), the Festival dei Due Mondi in Spoleto, Italy and at the Adelaide Festival in Australia. Following the structure established by Barton and Hall, Bogdanov combined a heavily edited 1 Henry VI and the first half of 2 Henry VI into one play (Henry VI), and the second half of 2 Henry VI and 3 Henry VI into another (Edward IV), and followed them with an edited Richard III. Also like Barton and Hall, Bogdanov concentrated on political issues, although he made them far more overt than had his predecessors. For example, played by June Watson, Margaret was closely modelled after the British Prime Minister at the time, Margaret Thatcher, even to the point of having similar clothes and hair. Likewise, Paul Brennan's Henry was closely modelled after King Edward VIII, prior to his abdication. Bogdanov also employed frequent anachronisms and contemporary visual registers (such as modern dress), in an effort to show the relevance of the politics to the contemporary period. The production was noted for its pessimism as regards British politics, with some critics feeling the political resonances were too heavy handed. However, the series was a huge box office success. Alongside Watson and Brennan, the play starred Michael Fenner as Talbot and Mary Rutherford as Joan.

Another adaptation of the tetralogy by the Royal Shakespeare Company followed in 1988, performed at the Barbican. Adapted by Charles Wood and directed by Adrian Noble, the Barton/Hall structure was again followed, reducing the trilogy to two plays by dividing 2 Henry VI in the middle. The resulting trilogy was entitled The Plantagenets, with the individual plays entitled Henry VI, The Rise of Edward IV and Richard III, His Death. Starring Ralph Fiennes as Henry, Penny Downie as Margaret, Mark Hadfield as Talbot and Julia Ford as Joan, the production was extremely successful with both audiences and critics.

Michael Bogdanov and the English Shakespeare Company presented a different adaptation at the Swansea Grand Theatre in 1991, using the same cast as on the touring production. All eight plays from the history cycle were presented over a seven night period, with each play receiving one performance only, and with only twenty-eight actors portraying the nearly five hundred roles. Whilst the other five plays in the cycle were unadapted, the Henry VI plays were combined into two, using the Barton/Hall structure, with the first named The House of Lancaster and the second, The House of York.

In 2000, Edward Hall presented the trilogy as a two-part series at the Watermill Theatre in Newbury. Hall followed the Jackson/Seale structure, combining 1 Henry VI and 2 Henry VI into one play that all but eliminated 1 Henry VI, and following this with an edited version of 3 Henry VI. This production was noted for how it handled the violence of the play. The set was designed to look like an abattoir, but rather than attempt to present the violence realistically (as most productions do), Hall went in the other direction, presenting the violence symbolically. Whenever a character was decapitated or killed, a red cabbage was sliced up whilst the actor mimed the death beside it.

In 2001, Tom Markus directed an adaptation of the tetralogy at the Colorado Shakespeare Festival. Condensing all fours plays into one, Markus named the play Queen Margaret, doing much the same with the character of Margaret as Merivale had done with York. Margaret was played by Gloria Biegler, Henry by Richard Haratine, York by Lars Tatom and Gloucester by Charles Wilcox. The only scene from 1 Henry VI was the meeting between Margaret and Suffolk.

Poster from the 2001 Shakespeare's Rugby Wars

Another unusual 2001 adaptation of the tetralogy was entitled Shakespeare's Rugby Wars. Written by Matt Toner and Chris Coculuzzi, and directed by Coculuzzi, the play was acted by the Upstart Crow Theatre Group and staged outdoors at the Robert Street Playing Field as part of the Toronto Fringe Festival. Presented as if it were a live rugby match between York and Lancaster, the 'play' featured commentary from Falstaff (Stephen Flett), which was broadcast live for the audience. The 'match' itself was refereed by 'Bill Shakespeare' (played by Coculuzzi), and the actors (whose characters' names all appeared on their jerseys) had microphones attached and would recite dialogue from all four plays at key moments.

In 2002, Leon Rubin presented the tetralogy as a trilogy at the Stratford Shakespeare Festival in Ontario. Using the Barton/Hall method of combining 1 Henry VI with the first half of 2 Henry VI, and the second half of 2 Henry VI with 3 Henry VI, the plays were renamed Henry VI: Revenge in France and Henry VI: Revolt in England. Michael Thierry played Henry, Seana McKenna played Margaret, Brad Rudy played Talbot and Michelle Giroux played Joan.

Also in 2002, Edward Hall and the Propeller company presented a one-play all-male cast modern dress adaptation of the trilogy at the Watermill Theatre. Under the title Rose Rage, Hall used a cast of only thirteen actors to portray the nearly one hundred and fifty speaking roles in the four-hour production, thus necessitating doubling and tripling of parts. Although a new adaptation, this production followed the Jackson/Seale method of eliminating almost all of 1 Henry VI (Joan was completely absent). The original cast included Jonathan McGuinness as Henry, Robert Hands as Margaret and Keith Bartlett as Talbot. After a successful run at the Watermill, the play moved to the Chicago Shakespeare Theater. The American cast included Carman Lacivita as Henry, Scott Parkinson as Margaret and Fletcher McTaggart as Talbot.

Outside England, a major adaptation of the tetralogy took place in 1864 in Weimar under the direction of Franz von Dingelstedt, who, seven years previously had staged the play unedited. Dingelstedt turned the trilogy into a two-parter under the general name Die weisse rose. The first play was called Haus Lancaster, the second Haus York. This adaptation was unique insofar as both plays were created by combining material from all three Henry VI plays. Following this structure, Alfred von Walzogen also produced a two-part play in 1875, under the general title Edward IV. Another European adaptation was in 1965 at the Teatro Piccolo in Milan. Directed by Giorgio Strehler it went under the title Il gioco del potenti (The Play of the Mighty). Using Barton and Hall's structure, Strehler also added several characters, including a Chorus, who used monologues from Richard II, both parts of Henry IV, Henry V, Macbeth and Timon of Athens, and two gravediggers called Bevis and Holland (after the names of two of Cade's rebels in the Folio text of 2 Henry VI), who commented (with dialogue written by Strehler himself) on each of the major characters as they set about burying them. A major German adaptation was Peter Palitzsch's two-part adaptation of the trilogy as Rosenkriege in 1967 at the Stuttgart State Theatre. Condensing the three plays into two, Heinrich VI and Eduard IV, Palitzsch's adaptation concluded with the opening monologue from Richard III.

=== Film ===
The only cinematic adaptation of the play came in the 1973 horror comedy film Theatre of Blood, directed by Douglas Hickox. Vincent Price stars in the film as Edward Lionheart, (self)regarded as the finest Shakespearean actor of all time. When he fails to be awarded the prestigious Critic's Circle Award for Best Actor, he sets out exacting bloody revenge on the critics who gave him poor reviews, with each act inspired by a death in a Shakespeare play. One such act of revenge involves the critic Chloe Moon (Coral Browne). Lionheart electrocutes Moon using a pair of hair curlers, whilst he recites excerpts from Act 5, Scene 4 of 1 Henry VI, where Joan is sentenced to burn at the stake.

=== Television ===
The first television adaptation was in 1960 when the BBC produced a serial entitled An Age of Kings. The show comprised fifteen sixty- and seventy-five-minute episodes that adapted all eight of Shakespeare's sequential history plays. Directed by Michael Hayes and produced by Peter Dews, with a script by Eric Crozier, the production featured Terry Scully as Henry, Mary Morris as Margaret and Eileen Atkins as Joan. The ninth episode, under the title "The Red Rose and the White", presented an abridged version of 1 Henry VI. With the episode only running one hour, much text was removed. The most significant cuts were the removal of the character Talbot, and battle scenes in France.

In 1965, BBC 1 broadcast all three plays from John Barton and Peter Hall's The Wars of the Roses trilogy (Henry VI, The Rise of Edward IV and Richard III). Directed for television by Robin Midgley and Michael Hayes, the plays were presented as more than filmed theatre, with the core idea being "to recreate theatre production in televisual terms – not merely to observe it, but to get to the heart of it." Filming was done on the RSC stage, but not during actual performances, thus allowing cameras to get close to the actors, and cameramen with hand-held cameras to shoot battle scenes. Camera platforms were created around the theatre. 12 cameras were used, allowing the final product to be edited more like a film than static filmed theatre. Filming was done following the 1964 run of the plays at Stratford-upon-Avon, and took place over an eight-week period, with fifty-two BBC staff working alongside eighty-four RSC staff. In 1966, the production was repeated on BBC 1 where it was re-edited into eleven episodes of fifty minutes each. The first episode, "The Inheritance" covered Acts 1, 2, 3 and Act 4, Scene 1, ending with Henry choosing a red rose and inadvertently aligning himself with Somerset. The second episode, "Margaret of Anjou", presented the rest of 1 Henry VI, beginning with Talbot confronting the French general at Harfleur (Bordeaux in the play), as well as the first half of Act 1, Scene 1 of 2 Henry VI.

Another television version of the play was produced by the BBC in 1981 for their BBC Television Shakespeare series, although the episode did not air until 1983. Directed by Jane Howell, the play was presented as the first part of the tetralogy (all four adaptations directed by Howell) with linked casting. Henry was played by Peter Benson, Margaret by Julia Foster, Talbot by Trevor Peacock and Joan by Brenda Blethyn. Howell's presentation of the complete first historical tetralogy was one of the most lauded achievements of the BBC series, and prompted Stanley Wells to argue that the productions were "probably purer than any version given in the theatre since Shakespeare's time." Michael Mannheim was similarly impressed, calling the tetralogy "a fascinating, fast-paced and surprisingly tight-knit study in political and national deterioration."

Joan (Brenda Blethyn) faces off against Talbot (Trevor Peacock) during the Siege of Orléans. Note the brightly coloured "adventure playground" set, which stands out against the obviously studio-bound parquet flooring.

Inspired by the notion that the political intrigues behind the Wars of the Roses often seemed like playground squabbles, Howell and production designer Oliver Bayldon staged the four plays in a single set resembling a children's adventure playground. However, little attempt was made at realism. For example, Bayldon did not disguise the parquet flooring ("it stops the set from literally representing [...] it reminds us we are in a modern television studio"), and in all four productions, the title of the play is displayed within the set itself (on banners in 1 Henry VI and 2 Henry VI, on a shroud in 3 Henry VI, and written on a chalkboard by Richard himself in Richard III). Many critics felt these set design choices lent the production an air of Brechtian verfremdungseffekt. Stanley Wells wrote that it was intended to invite the viewer to "accept the play's artificiality of language and action," Michael Hattaway describes it as "anti-illusionist," Susan Willis argues that the set allows the productions "to reach theatrically toward the modern world" and Ronald Knowles writes "a major aspect of the set was the subliminal suggestion of childlike anarchy, role-playing, rivalry, game and vandalism, as if all culture were precariously balanced on the shaky foundations of atavistic aggression and power-mad possession." Another element of verfremdungseffekt is seen when Gloucester and Winchester encounter one another at the Tower, both are on horseback, but the horses they ride are hobby-horses, which the actors (David Burke and Frank Middlemass respectively) cause to pivot and prance as they speak. The ridiculousness of this situation works to "effectively undercut their characters' dignity and status." The "anti-illusionist" set was also used as a means of political commentary; as the four plays progressed, the set decayed and became more and more dilapidated as social order became more fractious. In the same vein, the costumes become more monotone as the four plays move on. The First Part of Henry the Sixt features brightly coloured costumes that clearly distinguish the combatants from one another, but by The Tragedy of Richard III, everyone fights in similarly coloured dark costumes, with little to differentiate one army from another. Graham Holderness saw Howell's non-naturalistic production as something of a reaction to the BBC's adaptation of the Henriad in seasons one and two, which had been directed by David Giles in the traditional manner favoured by series producer Cedric Messina; "where Messina saw the history plays conventionally as orthodox Tudor historiography, and [David Giles] employed dramatic techniques that allow that ideology a free and unhampered passage to the spectator, Jane Howell takes a more complex view of the first tetralogy as, simultaneously, a serious attempt at historical interpretation, and as a drama with a peculiarly modern relevance and contemporary application. The plays, to this director, are not a dramatisation of the Elizabethan World Picture but a sustained interrogation of residual and emergent ideologies in a changing society [...] This awareness of the multiplicity of potential meanings in the play required a decisive and scrupulous avoidance of television or theatrical naturalism: methods of production should operate to open the plays out, rather than close them into the immediately recognisable familiarity of conventional Shakespearean production."

For the most part, Howell's adaptation is taken word-for-word from the First Folio, with relatively minor differences. For example, the adaptation opens differently to the play, with Henry VI singing a lament for his father. Another difference is that Fastolf's escape from Rouen is seen rather than only mentioned. Act 5, Scene 1 and Act 5, Scene 2 are reversed so that Act 4, Scene 7 and Act 5, Scene 2 now form one continuous piece. Numerous lines were cut from almost every scene. Notable omissions include; in Act 1, Scene 1, absent are Bedford's references to children crying and England becoming a marsh since Henry V died: "Posterity await for wretched years/When, at their mothers' moistened eyes, babes shall suck,/Our isle be made a marish of salt tears,/And none but women left to wail the dead." (ll.48–51). In Act 1, Scene 2, Alençon's praise of the resoluteness of the English army is absent: "Froissart, a countryman of ours, records/England all Olivers and Rolands bred/During the time Edward the Third did reign./More truly now may this be verified,/For none by Samsons and Goliases/It sendeth forth to skirmish." (ll.29–34). In Act 1, Scene 3, some of the dialogue between Gloucester and Winchester outside the Tower is absent (ll.36–43), whilst in Act 1, Scene 5, so too is Talbot's complaint about the French wanting to ransom him for a prisoner of less worth: "But with a baser man-of-arms by far,/Once in contempt they would have bartered me—/Which I, disdaining, scorned, and crav'd death/Rather than I would be so vile-esteemed" (ll.8–11). In Act 1, Scene 7, some of Charles' praise of Joan is absent: "A statelier pyramis to her I'll rear/Than Rhodope's of Memphis ever was./In memory of her, when she is dead,/Her ashes, in an urn more precious/Than the rich-jewelled coffer of Darius,/Transported shall be at high festivals/Before the kings and queens of France" (ll.21–27). In Act 3, Scene 1, some of Warwick's attack on Winchester is absent: "You see what mischief – and what murder too –/Hath been enacted through your enmity" (ll.27–28). In Act 4, Scene 6, some of the dialogue between Talbot and John has been removed (ll.6–25). The most interesting omissions come in Act 4, Scene 7. In this scene, twelve of Joan's sixteen lines have been cut; the entire seven line speech where she says John Talbot refused to fight her because she is a woman (ll.37–43); the first three lines of her five line mockery of Lucy's listing of Talbot's titles, "Here's a silly, stately style indeed./The Turk, that two-and-fifty kingdoms hath,/Writes not so tedious a style as this" (ll.72–75); and the first two lines of her four line speech where she mocks Lucy, "I think this upstart is old Talbot's ghost,/He speaks with such a proud commanding spirit" (ll.86–88). These omissions reduce Joan's role in this scene to a virtual spectator, and coupled with this, Brenda Blethyn portrays the character as if deeply troubled by something (presumably the loss of contact with her 'fiends').

Another notable stylistic technique used in the adaptation is the multiple addresses direct-to-camera. Much more so than in any of the sequels, the adaptation of 1 Henry VI has multiple characters addressing the camera continually throughout the play, oftentimes for comic effect. The most noticeable is Act 2, Scene 3, where Talbot meets the Countess of Auvergne. Almost all of her dialogue prior to line 32 ("If thou be he, then thou art prisoner") is delivered direct to camera, including her incredulous description of the difference between the real Talbot, and the reports she has heard of him. At one point, Auvergne exclaims "Alas, this is a child, a silly dwarf" (l.21), at which point Talbot himself looks at the camera in disbelief. The comedy of the scene is enhanced by having the 5-foot 10 actor Trevor Peacock playing Talbot, and the 6-foot 3 actress Joanna McCallum playing Auvergne. Elsewhere, addresses to the camera are found throughout the play. For example, as Bedford, Gloucester, Exeter and Winchester leave in Act 1, Scene 1, each one reveals their intentions direct-to-camera (ll.166–177).

Other examples are Joan's confession of where she got her sword (1.2.100–101); the Mayor's last two lines at the Tower (1.3.89–90); Talbot's "My thoughts are whirl'd like a potter's wheel./I know not where I am nor what I do./A witch, by fear, not force, like Hannibal,/Drives back our troops and conquers as she lists" (1.6.19–22); some of Mortimer's monologue prior to the arrival of Richard (2.5.22–32); Richard's "Plantagenet, I see, must hold his tongue,/Lest it be said, 'Speak, sirrah, when you should:/Must your bold verdict enter talk with lords?'/Else would I have a fling at Winchester" (3.1.61–64); Exeter's soliloquy at the end of Act 3, Scene 1 (ll.190–203); Exeter's soliloquy at the end of Act 4, Scene 1 (ll.182–194); most of the dialogue between Suffolk and Margaret as they ignore one another (5.4.16–64); and Suffolk's soliloquy, which closes the play (5.6.102–109). Also to-camera is Joan's "Poor market folks that come to sell their corn" (3.2.14), which is delivered as if it were a translation of the preceding line for the benefit of the non-French speaking audience.

In 1964, Austrian channel ORF 2 presented an adaptation of the trilogy by Leopold Lindtberg under the title Heinrich VI. The cast list from this production has been lost. In 1969, German channel ZDF presented a filmed version of the first part of Peter Palitzsch's 1967 two-part adaptation of the trilogy in Stuttgart, Heinrich VI: Der Krieg der Rosen 1. The second part, Eduard IV: Der Krieg der Rosen 2, was screened in 1971.

=== Radio ===
In 1923, extracts from all three Henry VI plays were broadcast on BBC Radio, performed by the Cardiff Station Repertory Company as the third episode of a series of programs showcasing Shakespeare's plays, entitled Shakespeare Night. In 1947, BBC Third Programme aired a one-hundred-and-fifty-minute adaptation of the trilogy as part of their Shakespeare's Historical Plays series, a six-part adaptation of the eight sequential history plays, with linked casting. Adapted by Maurice Roy Ridley, King Henry VI starred John Byron as Henry and Gladys Young as Margaret. Almost the entirety of 1 Henry VI was cut, with everything related to the conflict in France being removed. In 1952, Third Programme aired an adaptation of the tetralogy by Peter Watts and John Dover Wilson under the general name The Wars of the Roses. The tetralogy was adapted into a trilogy but in an unusual way. 1 Henry VI was simply removed, so the trilogy contained only 2 Henry VI, 3 Henry VI and Richard III. The adaptation starred Valentine Dyall as Henry and Sonia Dresdel as Margaret. In 1971, BBC Radio 3 presented a two-part adaptation of the trilogy by Raymond Raikes. Part 1 contained an abridged 1 Henry VI and an abridged version of the first three acts of 2 Henry VI. Part 2 presented Acts 4 and 5 of 2 Henry VI and an abridged 3 Henry VI. Nigel Lambert played Henry, Barbara Jefford played Margaret, Francis de Wolff played Talbot and Elizabeth Morgan played Joan. In 1977, BBC Radio 4 presented a 26-part serialisation of the eight sequential history plays under the general title Vivat Rex (long live the King). Adapted by Martin Jenkins as part of the celebration of the Silver Jubilee of Elizabeth II, 1 Henry VI comprised episodes 15 ("Joan of Arc") and 16 ("The White Rose and the Red"). James Laurenson played Henry, Peggy Ashcroft played Margaret, Clive Swift played Talbot, Hannah Gordon played Joan, and Richard Burton narrated.

In America, in 1936, a heavily edited adaptation of the trilogy was broadcast as part of NBC Blue's Radio Guild series. Comprising three sixty-minute episodes aired a week apart, the adaptation was written by Vernon Radcliffe and starred Henry Herbert as Henry and Janet Nolan as Margaret. In 1954, CBC Radio presented an adaptation of the trilogy by Andrew Allen, who combined 1 Henry VI, 2 Henry VI and 3 Henry VI into a one-hundred-and-sixty-minute episode. There is no known cast information for this production.

In 1985, German radio channel Sender Freies Berlin broadcast a heavily edited seventy-six-minute two-part adaptation of the octology adapted by Rolf Schneider, under the title Shakespeare's Rosenkriege.

=== Manga ===
Aya Kanno's Japanese manga comic Requiem of the Rose King is a loose adaptation of the first Shakespearean historical tetralogy, covering Henry VI and Richard III.
