= Charles Wood (playwright) =

British playwright and scriptwriter (1932–2020)

Charles Gerald Wood
- Born: 6 August 1932; Guernsey
- Died: 1 February 2020 (aged 87)
- Occupations: Playwright, screenwriter

Charles Gerald Wood FRSL (6 August 1932 – 1 February 2020) was an English playwright and scriptwriter for radio, television, and film.

His work has been staged at the Royal National Theatre as well as at the Royal Court Theatre and in the theatres of the Royal Shakespeare Company. He was elected a fellow of the Royal Society of Literature in 1984. Wood served in the 17th/21st Lancers and military themes are found in many of his works.

== Biography ==
Though he was born in the British Crown dependency of Guernsey—his parents were actors in a repertory company playing in Guernsey at the time—he left the island with his parents when he was still only an infant. His parents worked as actors in repertory and fit-ups (travelling theatrical groups) mainly in the north of England and Wales and had no fixed place of abode. His education was, until the outbreak of the Second World War, sporadic. The family settled in Chesterfield, Derbyshire, in 1939. The first house they rented was 1 Cromwell Road and the second was 20 Abercrombie Street. He attended St Mary's Catholic Primary School from which he was awarded a Special Place at Chesterfield Grammar School.

At the war's end, the family relocated to Kidderminster in Worcestershire where Charles Wood obtained a place at King Charles I Grammar School. He was by now old enough to work in the theatre managed by his father Jack Wood. This was The Playhouse, later demolished. He worked as a stagehand and electrician and assistant to scenic artists in his spare time at weekends and every night. He also played small parts in the repertory company produced by his father. His mother Mae Harris was a leading actress in the company. In 1948, Wood gained entrance to Birmingham School of Art to study theatrical design and lithography.

Wood joined the Army in 1950, and served five years with the 17th/21st Lancers and seven years on reserve. He was discharged with the rank of corporal, reduced to trooper on entering the Regular Army Reserve.

He married Valerie Newman, an actress, in 1954. She was working in repertory in a theatre at Worcester, the Theatre Royal, once the second oldest working theatre in the country.

On leaving the Army, Wood worked as an electronic wireman at BAC, Filton near Bristol. Later he worked as a scenic artist, layout artist, stage manager in England and Canada. He returned to Bristol with a job in the advertising department at the Bristol Evening Post (at the same time Tom Stoppard was a journalist at the newspaper) until 1963 when he became a full-time writer.

== Writings ==
Wood wrote his first play, Prisoner and Escort, in 1959. It was a play for television which was first performed on radio, then on the stage and later on television. Cockade won the Evening Standard Theatre Award for Most Promising New Writer in 1963.

Wood's work is known for its concern with British military life. In his preface to Wood's Plays One, director Richard Eyre commented: "There is no contemporary writer who has chronicled the experience of modern war with so much authority, knowledge, compassion, wit and despair, and there is no contemporary writer who has received so little of his deserved public acclaim." Critics applauded his earliest plays such as Cockade (1963) for the details of military life, and his use of military argot and vernacular. He explored many aspects of contemporary military life. Drill Pig (1964) was a black comedy about a young man who joins the army to escape his civilian life and his wife and her parents. Don't Make Me Laugh exposed military and civilian attitudes through the home life of a sergeant, his wife and their lodger. Death Or Glory Boy (1974) was a semi-autobiographical TV series about a grammar school boy joining the army.

His work also covered warfare during many different periods of British military history. Wood's plays have been described as "pro-soldier and anti-war". He was concerned with the experiences of fighting soldiers rather than patriotism or heroism. Dingo (1967) was a black comedy attacking British myths and cliches about WWII. Wood wrote the script for the film of The Charge Of The Light Brigade (1968) after John Osborne had been sued for plagiarising Cecil Woodham-Smith's The Reason Why. H, Being Monologues at Front of Burning Cities (1969) was a historical pageant about Sir Henry Havelock's military campaign during the Indian Mutiny of 1857. Jingo (1975) was about the fall of Singapore and the symbolic end of British dominance in East Asia. The television film Tumbledown (1988), directed by Richard Eyre, was the story of Robert Lawrence MC, written after many interviews with Robert Lawrence. (Lawrence later wrote his own version of his story called When the Fighting is Over.) Wood wrote an episode of Kavanagh QC ("Mute of Malice", 1997) about an army chaplain traumatised by his experiences in Bosnia. He adapted numerous novels about war into film and television scripts including How I Won the War (1967) from a novel by Patrick Ryan; The Long Day's Dying (1968) from a novel by Alan White; A Breed of Heroes (1994) from a novel by Alan Judd about a young British officer in Belfast; and three episodes of Sharpe.

Many of his works have a semi-autobiographical element, employing his personal and professional life as a writer, working in theatre and movies. Last Summer By The Seaside (1964) was a documentary / cinema verite commentary about the English at play on the beach written and narrated by Charles Wood about his family on their annual holiday visit to his parents on the Isle of Wight. Fill the Stage With Happy Hours (1966) was a comedy about a run-down repertory theatre. A Bit of a Holiday (1969) which starred George Cole as the writer Gordon Maple rewriting a historical screenplay in Rome was inspired by the filming of The Adventures of Gerard. Veterans; or, Hair in the Gates of the Hellespont drew on the filming of The Charge of the Light Brigade with John Gielgud playing a character based on John Gielgud. Has "Washington" Legs? (1978) was written for America's bicentennial celebrations and was another comedy about film-making. A Bit Of An Adventure (1974) was about the life of writer Gordon Maple as played by George Cole. Cole played George Maple again in two series of Wood's sitcom Don't Forget to Write! (1977 and 1979) about the frustrations of a writer's life. Across from the Garden of Allah (1985) was a comedy about an unsuccessful English screenwriter in Hollywood.

While Wood remained active in the theatre, a string of television dramas followed in the 1970s. The first of these was also perhaps the strangest: The Emergence of Anthony Purdy Esq, Farmer’s Labourer was an experimental piece starring Freddie Jones and Judy Matheson, about which little else is known, bar that it was made by Harlech, the ITV company for the South Wales and Western England region, and was ITV’s drama entry at the Monte Carlo TV festival. It was not widely networked, which is perhaps unsurprising in light of the comment by The Guardian’s critic Nancy Banks-Smith that it was “completely incomprehensible to anyone east of Somerset”. Because Wood lived in Bristol as his writing career was starting, many of his early works were written about Bristol and also staged there. At that time other rising playwrights such as Peter Nichols and Tom Stoppard lived there. Meals On Wheels (1965) was an experimental satire about provincial conservatism and repression which was to have been performed at the Bristol Old Vic but interference from Bristol Council meant it was rejected. Drums Along the Avon (1967) was a TV play about racial integration in Bristol which had to be broadcast with a disclaimer that "it is a fantasy and we devoutly hope that no one in Bristol will see it otherwise". Wood had submitted Dingo to the National Theatre Company, but the Chamberlain's rejection of licence meant it could not be performed there, so Bristol Arts Centre staged the play under club membership conditions to circumvent censorship.

Wood had productive relationships with leading individuals in the British film and theatre industry. He worked numerous times with Richard Lester. Their first collaboration was on the film The Knack ...and How to Get It (1965) when the producer Oscar Lewenstein recommended Wood write the adaptation. He worked again with Lester on the screenplay for Help! (1965) and How I Won the War (1967), adapted from the Patrick Ryan novel and featuring some of the material from Wood’s play Dingo. His other screenplays for Richard Lester were The Bed Sitting Room (1969), from the Spike Milligan play, and Cuba (1979). Inspired by stories by Yuri Krotkov, Wood wrote for Lester a script about the catastrophes suffered by a Russian actor who bears an uncanny resemblance to Stalin, but when financing fell through it was performed as Red Star by the Royal Shakespeare Company in 1984. Wood first worked with the director Richard Eyre when he directed the stage play Jingo (1975). Richard Eyre directed Wood’s television film Tumbledown (1988). Wood cowrote with Eyre the scripts for Eyre’s films Iris (2001) and The Other Man (2008). Wood wrote the screenplays for three Channel 4 films about composers, each directed by Tony Palmer: Wagner (1983); Puccini (1984); and England, My England (1995), completing John Osborne's screenplay about Purcell after it had been abandoned owing to Osborne's terminal illness.

Though Wood's plays are rarely revived, his play Jingo was produced by Primavera at the Finborough Theatre in March 2008, directed by Tom Littler. Jingo, subtitled A Farce of War, is set during the last days of British control of Singapore before the humiliating surrender to the Japanese. Susannah Harker played Gwendoline and Anthony Howell her ex-husband Ian.

=== Theatre plays ===
- Cockade New Arts Theatre, London 1963 (three one-act plays: Prisoner and Escort, John Thomas, and Spare)
- Tie Up the Ballcock, Bristol Arts Centre 1964 (one act play)
- Meals On Wheels, Royal Court Theatre 1965 (directed by John Osborne)
- Don't Make Me Laugh, Royal Shakespeare Company 1965 (one act play, part of "Home And Colonial")
- Fill the Stage With Happy Hours , Nottingham 1966
- US, Royal Shakespeare Company, 1966, contributed speeches to Peter Brook's an anti-Vietnam protest play
- Dingo, Bristol Arts Centre 1967
- H, Being Monologues at Front of Burning Cities, National Theatre 1969
- Welfare Liverpool Everyman, 1970-1 (three one-act plays: includes Tie Up the Ballcock, Meals on Wheels, Labour)
- Veterans; or, Hair in the Gates of the Hellespont, Royal Court Theatre 1972
- Jingo, Aldwych Theatre, 1975
- Has "Washington" Legs? , National Theatre 1978
- The Garden, Sherborne, Dorset 1982 (directed by Ann Jellicoe)
- Red Star, Royal Shakespeare Company 1984
- Across from the Garden of Allah, Bath / Guildford / Comedy Theatre 1985-1986

=== Television scripts ===
- Traitor In A Steel Helmet BBC 18 September 1961
- Not At All BBC 12 October 1962 (Two male layout artists from a London advertising agency head off on holiday to the Isle of Wight in the hope of finding romance)
- Prisoner and Escort ITV 5 April 1964
- Drill Pig ITV 14 December 1964
- Last Summer By The Seaside BBC1 29 December 1964
- Drums along the Avon BBC1 24 May 1967
- A Bit of a Holiday ITV 1 December 1969
- The Emergence of Anthony Purdy Esq, Farmer’s Labourer Bristol HTV 1970
- A Bit of Family Feeling ITV 1 June 1971
- A Bit Of Vision ITV 6 August 1972
- Death Or Glory Boy ITV 10–24 March 1974
- Mützen Ab! BBC2 6 May 1974 (Nazi-hunters' celebrations over the discovery of a South American war criminal receive a jolt when a rival candidate crops up in Munich)
- A Bit Of An Adventure ITV 21 July 1974
- Do As I Say BBC1 25 January 1977 (black comedy about the rape of a suburban housewife)
- Don't Forget to Write! (series 1 - 6 episodes) BBC2 18/4–23 May 1977
- Love-lies-bleeding ITV 12 July 1977 (black comedy as a dinner party comes under sniper attacks )
- Don't Forget to Write! (series 2 - 6 episodes) BBC2 18/1–22 February 1979
- Red Monarch Channel 4 16 June 1983 (adapted from The Red Monarch: Scenes From the Life of Stalin by Yuri Krotkov)
- Wagner Channel 4 6 January 1983
- Puccini Channel 4 5 December 1984
- Dust to Dust ITV 7 December 1985 (thriller in which a murderess kills suitors for their money)
- My Family and Other Animals BBC 17 October – 19 December 1987 (10 episodes) (based on the memoir by Gerald Durrell)
- Inspector Morse (The Settling of the Sun) ITV 15 March 1988
- Tumbledown BBC1 31 May 1988 (won Prix Italia RAI Prize, Best Single Play BAFTA, Best Single Play RTS, Best Single Play BPG)
- Sharpe: Sharpe's Company ITV 25 May 1994 (adapted from novel by Bernard Cornwell)
- A Breed of Heroes BBC1 4 September 1994
- England, My England Channel 4 1995
- Sharpe: Sharpe's Regiment ITV 1 May 1996 (adapted from novel by Bernard Cornwell)
- Kavanagh Q.C. (Mute of Malice) ITV 3 March 1997
- Sharpe: Sharpe's Waterloo ITV 21 May 1997 (adapted from novel by Bernard Cornwell)
- Kavanagh QC (Briefs Trooping Gaily) ITV 31 March 1998 (Kavanagh defends a woman charged with killing her abusive husband)
- Monsignor Renard ITV 10 April 2000

=== Film screenplays ===
- The Knack ...and How to Get It 1965 (adapted from the play by Ann Jellicoe) (Grand Prix Cannes, Screenwriters Guild Award)
- Help! 1965
- How I Won the War 1967 (adapted from novel by Patrick Ryan)
- The Charge Of The Light Brigade 1968
- The Long Day's Dying 1968 (adapted from novel by Alan White)
- The Bed Sitting Room 1969 (adapted from play by Spike Milligan)
- The Adventures of Gerard 1970 (adapted from Arthur Conan Doyle’s stories dir. Jerzy Skolimowski)
- Cuba 1979
- An Awfully Big Adventure 1995 (adapted from novel by Beryl Bainbridge)
- Iris 2001
- The Other Man 2008

=== Radio plays ===
- Prisoner and Escort
- Cowheel Jelly 2 November 1962
- Next to Being a Knight 8 December 1972 (play about a child's imagination)
- The Fire Raisers 16 January 2005 (adapted from the play by Max Frisch)
- The Conspiracy of Sèvres 3 November 2006 (play about the Suez Crisis) (nominated by the WGGB in the best radio play category for 2007.)

=== Translations ===
- Wood wrote the English dialogue for the dubbed version of Fellini's Satyricon (1969)
- The Can Opener ('Le Tourniquet' by Victor Lanoux) London 1974
- Man, Beast and Virtue ('L'uomo, la bestia, e la virtu' by Luigi Pirandello), National Theatre 1989
- The Mountain Giants ('Uriasii Muntilor' by Luigi Pirandello), National Theatre, 1993
- The Tower, Or Marguerite de Bourgogne ('La Tour de Nesle' by Alexandre Dumas pere), Almeida Theatre, 1996
- Ms Courage ('Landstörtzerin Courasche' by Hans Jakob Christoffel von Grimmelshausen), in Plays Three, Charles Wood, Oberon Books, 2005

=== Selected bibliography ===
- Plays 1: "Veterans" & "Across from the Garden of Allah" (Oberon Books, 1997)
- Plays 2: "H", "Jingo", "Dingo" (Oberon Books, 1999)
- Plays 3: "Fill the Stage with Happy Hours", "Red Star", "Ms.Courage" (Oberon Books, 2005)
- Screenplay: "Tumbledown" (Penguin 1987)
- Screenplay: "Iris" (Bloomsbury, 2002)
