= Thomas Gargrave (soldier) =

Sir Thomas Gargrave (died 1428), Knight, Master of the Ordnance and Marshall of the English army of Henry VI in France was killed during the Siege of Orléans along with the Earl of Salisbury. Hall explains that on 26 October 1428 a cannon shot shattered the iron grate of the observation tower where Gargrave and Salisbury were standing. Gargrave died two days later and Salisbury died ten days later. Gargrave's life is commemorated in a small role in William Shakespeare's Henry VI, Part 1, Act I, Scene 4.

== Family ==
Gargrave's father was Sir John Gargrave, Knight, also Master of the Ordnance under Henry V and a Governor in France. His mother Margaret was a daughter of William Scargil, Esquire. Thomas left no children.
