= The Long Day's Dying =

1968 British film by Peter Collinson

- Film poster
- Directed by: Peter Collinson
- Screenplay by: Charles Wood; Michael Deeley (uncredited); Peter Yates (uncredited)
- Based on: The Long Day's Dying by Alan White
- Produced by: Harry Fine
- Starring: David Hemmings; Tony Beckley; Tom Bell; Alan Dobie
- Cinematography: Brian Probyn
- Edited by: John Trumper
- Music by: Malcolm Lockyer
- Production company: Junction Films Limited
- Distributed by: Paramount Pictures
- Release date: 28 May 1968
- Running time: 95 minutes
- Country: United Kingdom
- Language: English
- Budget: £150,000-£200,000

The Long Day's Dying is a 1968 British Techniscope war film directed by Peter Collinson, and starring David Hemmings, Tony Beckley and Tom Bell. It is based on the 1962 novel of the same name by Alan White.

== Plot ==
Three British paratroopers are cut off from their unit and are lost behind enemy lines. Sheltering in a deserted farmhouse, they are awaiting the return of their Sergeant who has ventured out in an attempt to locate their unit. The three soldiers are Tom, a world-weary cynical veteran, John, a middle-class educated thinker who despises war and Cliff, an eager soldier who loves his work. All three are highly trained professional killers who, regardless of their own personal thoughts, do not hesitate to perform their duties.

Two German soldiers approach the farmhouse and the paratroopers dispatch them both. The second of the enemy attackers is stalked by the paratroopers who virtually toy with their victim before John kills him, finishing the man off up close, although the experience renders him sick. As the three men eat a meal, they are surprised and captured by a third German named Helmut, a paratrooper like themselves. The British soon turn the tables and capture Helmut but the latter, who speaks English, manages to manipulate his captors into keeping him alive. The group leave the house in search of their Sergeant whom they eventually find dead in the woods, his throat cut. The men continue on, trying to find their way back to Allied lines. They come across a farmhouse, where a trio of Germans are sheltering. The paratroopers cautiously approach and shoot them, only to find that the Germans are already dead.

After spending the night in the house, the group continues their walk back to the British lines, only to run into a German patrol. In the ensuing battle, all of the Germans are killed but Cliff is fatally wounded. John and Tom reach the frontline, taking their prisoner Helmut with them but nearby British troops mistake them all to be German and open fire, mortally wounding Tom. Both injured themselves, John and Helmut take cover in a muddy ditch. There, John decides to kill Helmut with a small skewer he has always carried with him. Delirious with exhaustion and trauma, John staggers into the open, yelling that he is a pacifist before the British troops open fire again, shooting him dead.

== Cast ==
- David Hemmings as John
- Tony Beckley as Cliff
- Tom Bell as Tom Cooper
- Alan Dobie as Helmut

== Production ==
According to Michael Deeley, he and Peter Yates worked on the first draft of the script but were denied credit. He claims he gave Collinson the job partly to see if he was up to the task of directing The Italian Job (1969).

=== Filming ===
The film was shot at Twickenham Studios, London, England.

== Reception ==
=== Critical reception ===
The Monthly Film Bulletin wrote:

It is symptomatic of all that is wrong with Peter Collinson's third film that it should end on a frozen frame of a soldier in the act of dying while heavily ironic patriotic music swells on the soundtrack. As with The Penthouse [1967], Collinson seems not to know when enough is enough, and the result is a film in which the director's technical self-indulgence undermines some promising ideas. ... Collinson makes effective use of natural sound to underline the ritual nature of the killing, and he is well supported by Brian Probyn's colour photography, with its emphasis on neutral colours like green and brown and its constantly changing focus. But where he goes badly wrong is that instead of underplaying the deaths that are the end result of the soldiers' games, he gives them an entirely false – and worse, self-consciously artistic – emphasis. ... Charles Wood's script has the same fault, developing the relationship between the paratroopers and their wily prisoner with some subtlety, but in its succession of interior monologues and would-be significant staccato exchanges striking the same exhibitionist note as Collinson's tasteless insistence on ramming home his message.

Renata Adler, reviewing the film's release in The New York Times in 1968 wrote: "There are some excellent scenes ... But the screenplay is unendurable. Smug, dimestore Existential ...stale, self-important and tough ... No characterization ... One for the English antiwar cheapshot satire brigade".

Mark Connelly wrote (in 2003): "Critics hated the film, finding in it much the same faults as they identified in The Charge of the Light Brigade [1968]". (Charles Wood wrote the screenplay for both films) "They were confused by the fact that it was an anti-war film that celebrated some of the values of war and army life. Wood was showing, as he did in The Charge, that war has a complex hold over the minds and imaginations of humans. That although it is ultimately an awful, destructive, wasteful process, it has inspired men and motivated them intellectually and emotionally".

=== Accolades ===
The film was listed to compete at the 1968 Cannes Film Festival, but the festival was cancelled due to the events of May 1968 in France. The film was then able to compete at the 1968 San Sebastián International Film Festival, where it won its top prize, the Golden Shell for Best Film.
