= Alan White (novelist) =

English novelist and journalist

- Born: 23 February 1924; Hunslet, Yorkshire, England
- Died: February 2003 (aged 78–79); Salisbury, Wiltshire, England
- Occupation: Novelist
- Writing career
- Genres: War novels, Militaria
- Notable work: The Long Day's Dying

Alan White (23 February 1924 – February 2003) was an English novelist and journalist. He used his experiences as a Second World War commando leader in his writings. He also wrote using the names "Alec Haig", "James Fraser" and "Alec Whitney". Under the pseudonym "Joe Balham" he wrote seven novels based on The Sweeney television series. His novel The Long Day's Dying was made into a 1968 film directed by Peter Collinson. White wrote mysteries, as well as war and adventure novels. White died in Salisbury, Wiltshire in February 2003.

== Bibliography ==
=== Novels ===
==== Written as Alan White ====
- The Long Day's Dying (1962) (American title: Death Finds the Day)
- The Wheel (1966)
- The Long Night's Walk (1968)
- Long Drop (1969)
- Kibbutz (1970) (American title: Possess the Land)
- Climate of Revolt (1971)
- The Long Watch (1971)
- The Long Midnight (1972)
- The Long Fuse (1973)
- Armstrong (1973)
- The Long Summer (1974)
- Death in Duplicate (1974)
- Death in Darkness (1975), as Alec Whitney for the American edition
- The Long Silence (1976)
- The Long Hand of Death (1977)
- Cassidy's Yard (1980)
- The Years of Change 1983
- Black Alert (1985)

==== Written as James Fraser ====
- The Evergreen Death (1968)
- A Cock-Pit of Roses (1969)
- Deadly Nightshade (1970)
- Death in a Pheasant's Eye (1971)
- Blood on a Widow's Cross (1972)
- The Five-Leafed Clover (1973)
- A Wreath of Lords and Ladies (1974)
- Who Steals My Name? (1976)
- Hearts Ease in Death (1977)

==== Written as Bill Reade ====
- What Have They Done to You, Ben? (1967)
- I wonder What Happened to Tom? (1968)
- A Bomb for Atuna (1975)
- The Ibiza Syndicate (1975)

==== Written as Alec Haig ====
- Sign on for Tokyo (1968)
- Flight from Montenegro Bay (1972)
- Peruvian Printout (1974)

==== Written as Alec Whitney ====
- Every Man Has His Price (1968)
- The Triple Zero (1971)

==== Written as Joe Balham ====
- The Sweeney: Regan and the Lebanese Shipment (1977)
- The Sweeney: Regan and the Human Pipeline (1977)
- The Sweeney: Regan and the Bent Stripper (1977)
- The Sweeney: Regan and the Snout Who Cried Wolf (1977)
- The Sweeney: Regan and the Venetian Virgin (1978)
- The Sweeney: Regan and the High Rollers (1978)
- Sweeney 2: The Blag (1978)
- Desert Command (1979)
