= Patrick Ryan (English author) =

English writer (1916–1989)

Patrick Ryan (1916–1989) was an English author whose best-known work, the satirical war novel How I Won the War, was made into a 1967 film of the same name directed by Richard Lester.

== Biography ==
Patrick Ryan was born in Newport, on the Isle of Wight in 1916 to a family of Irish origin. He was educated at The Haberdashers' Aske's Boys' School.

On the outbreak of war in 1939 he enlisted in the Royal Warwickshire Regiment, was commissioned as an officer, and then transferred to The Fourth Regiment of the Reconnaissance Corps of the Royal Armoured Corps. He served in North Africa, Italy, and Greece.

He moved to Leeds in the 1950s as Assistant Head Postmaster, and his "apprenticeship" in adapting to Yorkshire life is related in his humorous memoir How I Became A Yorkshireman, published in the late 1960s. He later became Head Postmaster at Harrogate and was a regular contributor for Punch and The New Scientist in the 1960s and 1970s, as well as writing several television plays and some episodes of "The Army Game" and "Bootsie and Snudge" both popular army based television comedy sitcoms at that time. He also wrote pieces for The Smithsonian and the New York Saturday Evening Post. In 1968 he returned to the South of England, becoming Head Postmaster of Kingston-upon-Thames until his retirement from the Post Office. He was married with one daughter.

== Published works ==
- How I Won the War (1963)
- Hubert Calendar Counts his Blessings (1965)
- How I Became a Yorkshireman (1967)
- Clancy, My Friend, My Friend (1969)
