= Leon Rubin =

British theatre director

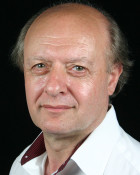
Leon Rubin

Leon Rubin is a UK theatre director, theatre management consultant, academic, writer, and former Director of East 15 Acting School. He is a member of the Directors Guild of Great Britain and a Fellow of the Royal Society of Arts and a Fellow of the Royal Asiatic Society. He was the first foreigner to be awarded an Honorary Professorship of GITIS Russian Theatre Academy, Moscow, in 1997. He began his career as assistant director at the Royal Shakespeare Company, and has been artistic director of three major UK theatre companies: Lyric Theatre, Belfast, Watford Palace theatre the Bristol Old Vic and Associate at the Abbey Theatre, Dublin and a frequent guest at the Stratford Festival, Canada.

Rubin has directed theatre production in many countries across the world. In April 2019 it was announced that he had decided to step down from his position as Director of East 15 Acting School, and joined the school's newly formed research department, undertaking an initial 2-year research programme and focusing on directing and writing. Routledge published his book, Rehearsing Shakespeare in 2021. He then became Dean of Performing Arts at LaSalle College of the Arts, Singapore.

== Career ==
He began his career with the Royal Shakespeare Company after studying at York University in the UK and McMaster and University of Toronto in Canada. In addition to assisting a number of distinguished UK directors, Trevor Nunn, Terry Hands, Ronald Eyre and David Jones among others, he was assistant director on the multiple award-winning production of Nicholas Nickleby in London and New York. He also wrote a popular book about the making of the production: The Nicholas Nickleby Story, published by Heinemann in the UK and Penguin in the USA He is at present (since 2007) Director of East 15 Acting School, part of the University of Essex, UK and was former Head of Drama at Middlesex University, He was Chair of CDS (Conference of Drama Schools) before it became part of Drama UK and was one of the guiding founders and now sits on the Board.

=== Director ===
Leon has directed plays for numerous key theatre companies globally. He has also conducted Masterclasses, workshops and seminars at theatre companies, conservatoires and universities worldwide. His work has been in the UK, USA, Canada, Scotland, Ireland, Holland, France, Spain, Russia, Chile, Japan, Thailand, Singapore, Taiwan, Brazil, Hong Kong, China, Philippines and Greece. His work as a Director has involved major theatre companies such as the Abbey Theatre, Dublin, Stratford Festival Theatre, Canada, Bungaku-za Theatre Company, Tokyo among many others. He directed the longest-running show ever produced in S.E. Asia: Phuket Fantasea in Thailand in 1999, in a purpose-built 3800-seat theatre, and this show is still running today (2019). The show is an unusual blend of Las Vegas technical effects, traditional Thai performance techniques and styles and aerial circus skills. Over 6 years he directed a series of large-scale Shakespeare productions at the Stratford Festival, Ontario, Canada. Including among other productions: Pericles, Measure for Measure, Midsummer Nights Dream, Henry V1 Parts 1,2 and 3 (in his own adaptation), Twelfth Night and Two Gentleman of Verona. In Greece and Japan he directed numerous leading actors for many companies. His shows have also been seen in London's West End and in New York at the Lincoln Centre.

==== Publications and adaptations ====
In addition to his book, The Making of Nicholas Nickleby, that told the story of the creation of the original Royal Shakespeare Company production, from first conception to the multiple, award-winning production. He has his latest book, by Routledge, Performance in Bali, co-written with the distinguished Balinese Dalang, I Nyoman Sedana. The book explores key aspects of Balinese performance and explores training and performance techniques from the inside Balinese perspective and the outsider looking in. He wrote a book length commentary of Measure for Measure, Applause Books, New York and also contributed the chapter on South East Asian Theatre for the Oxford Illustrated History of Theatre; the chapter explores the major forms of theatre throughout the countries of the region: www.oup.co.uk He has given Key Note speeches and papers on Asian performance around the world and adapted a number of plays for professional productions.

==== Arts sonsultant ====
Rubin has taken the role of consultant to a number of institutions around the world, including the Arts Council, Hong Kong, the King of Thailand and various theatre companies.
