= Henry VI, Part 2 =

Play by Shakespeare

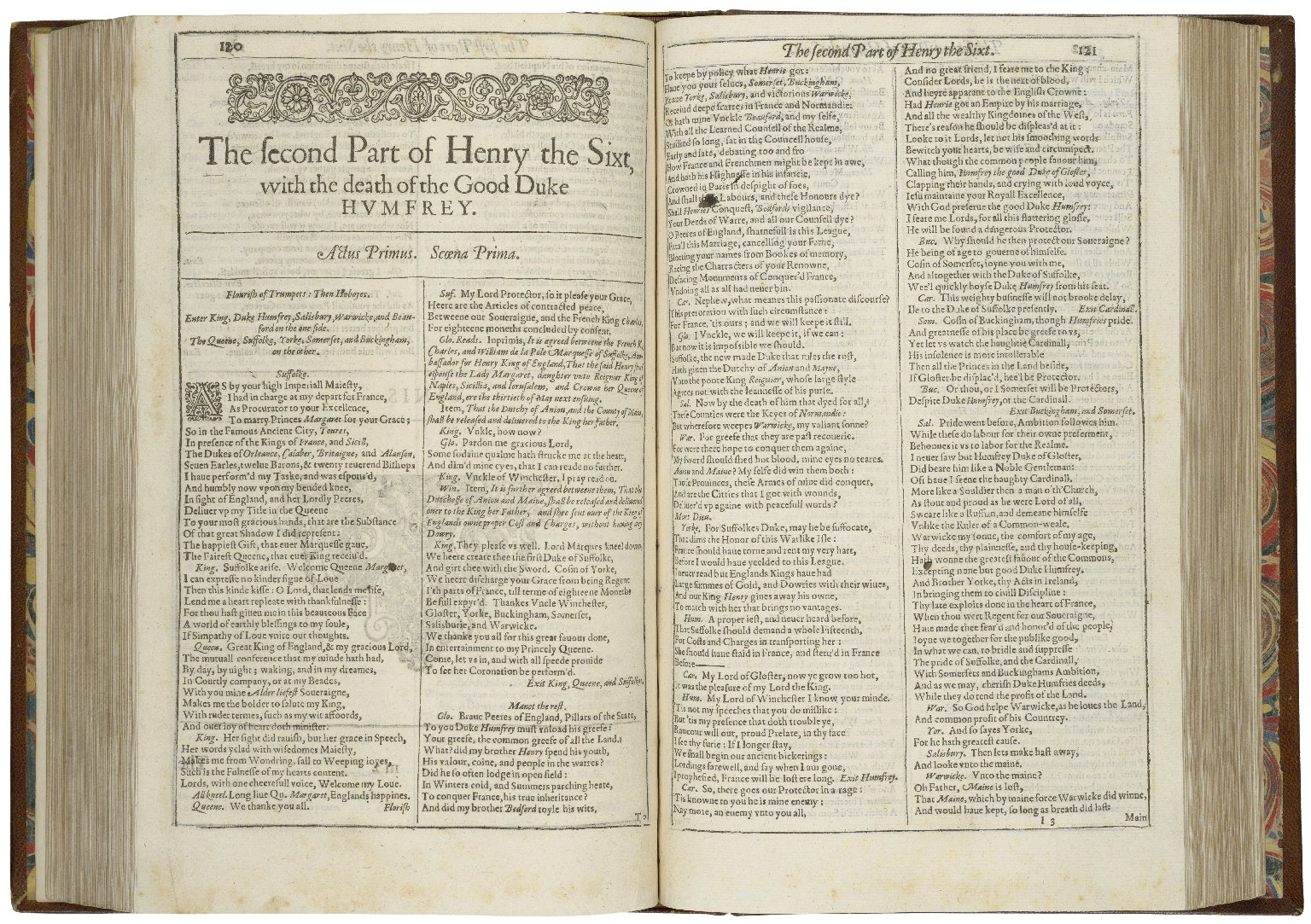
The title page of The second Part of Henry the Sixt, with the death of the Good Duke Humfrey from the First Folio (1623)

Henry VI, Part 2 (1591) is a Shakespearean history play about King Henry VI of England's inability to quell the bickering of his noblemen, the death of his trusted advisor Humphrey, Duke of Gloucester, and the political rise of Richard of York, 3rd Duke of York; it culminates with the First Battle of St Albans (1455), the initial battle of the Wars of the Roses, which were civil wars between the House of Lancaster and the House of York.

In the early historical narrative of Henry VI, Part 1 (1591), William Shakespeare deals with the low morale consequent to the loss of England's French territories (1429–1453) during the Hundred Years' War (1337–1453) and the political machinations that precipitated the Wars of the Roses (1455–1487). In the concluding play, Henry VI, Part 3 (1591), he deals with the fraternal horrors of civil war amongst Englishmen.

In English literature, The Tragedy of Richard III (1594) is included with the trilogy of stageplays about King Henry VI to make up an informal tetralogy of history plays about the family sagas that motivated the Wars of the Roses for control of the throne of England. Shakespeare's historical narrative begins with the death of Henry V of England in 1422 and continues for sixty-three years to the ascent of Henry VII of England in 1485.

== Characters ==
Of the King's Party

- King Henry VI – King of England
- Queen Margaret – Queen to Henry VI
- Humphrey, Duke of Gloucester – Henry VI's uncle and Lord Protector of England
- Eleanor, Duchess of Gloucester – Gloucester's wife
- Cardinal Beaufort – Bishop of Winchester, Henry VI's great-uncle
- William de la Pole – Marquis, later Duke, of Suffolk; lover of Queen Margaret
- Duke of Buckingham – Henry VI's second cousin once removed
- Duke of Somerset (Note: A conflation of John Beaufort, 1st Duke of Somerset, who was regent of France, and his younger brother Edmund Beaufort, 2nd Duke of Somerset, who was killed at the First Battle of St Albans.) – Henry VI's first cousin once removed
- Lord Clifford – military commander
- Young Clifford – Lord Clifford's son

Of the Duke of York's Party

- Richard Plantagenet, 3rd Duke of York – Henry VI's second cousin one removed, asserts he should be king
- Edward, Earl of March – Richard's son
- Richard Plantagenet – Richard's son
- Earl of Salisbury – Richard's brother-in-law
- Earl of Warwick – Salisbury's son

The Petitions and the Combat

- Thomas Horner – armourer
- Peter Thump – his apprentice
- Petitioners, Prentices, Neighbours

The Conjuration

- John Hum (Note: Referred to as Hume in the First Folio, but Hum in the 1594 quarto. That Hum is the correct spelling is confirmed at 1.2.88–89, where the name is used to form a rhyming couplet with 'mum'.) – priest
- John Southwell – priest
- Margery Jourdayne (Note: Referred to as Jordan in the First Folio, but Jourdayne in the 1594 quarto. That Jourdayne is the correct spelling is illustrated when the name occurs in blank verse, where the iambic pentameter dictates the stress must fall on the second syllable (as it does with Jourdayne), not the first (as it does with Jordan).) – witch
- Roger Bolingbroke – conjurer
- Asmath (Note: As there is no known demon of this name in any religion, several editors have modified the name. For example, in his Oxford Shakespeare edition of the play, Roger Warren refers to the fiend as Asmodeus on the basis that Asmodeus is an evil spirit in the Book of Tobit, and Asmath is a misreading of the abbreviation Asmode. In his Arden Shakespeare, 2nd Series edition, Andrew S. Cairncross refers to it as Asnath, on the basis that Asnath is an anagram for Satan. In his Arden Shakespeare 3rd Series edition, Ronald Knowles also uses the name Asnath.) – a spirit

The False Miracle

- Sander Simpcox – impostor
- Simpcox's wife
- Mayor of St Albans
- Alderman of St Albans
- A beadle of St Albans

Eleanor's Penance

- Sheriff of London
- Sir John Stanley – Governor of the Isle of Man (historically Sir Thomas Stanley)
- Gloucester's Servants
- Herald

Murder of Gloucester

- Two Murderers

Murder of Suffolk

- Lieutenant – commander of a ship
- Master of the Ship
- Master's Mate
- Walter Whitmore – sailor on ship
- Two Gentlemen – prisoners with Suffolk

The Cade Rebellion

- Jack Cade – rebel leader
- Dick the Butcher – rebel
- Smith the Weaver – rebel
- George Bevis (Note: Named only in the 1594 quarto text; in the First Folio he is simply First Rebel.) – rebel
- John Holland (Note: Named only in the 1594 quarto text; in the First Folio he is simply Second Rebel.) – rebel
- John (Note: The name comes from dialogue only, not stage directions. In most productions, he is played by the same actor who plays John Holland/Second Rebel.) – rebel
- Emmanuel – Clerk of Chatham
- Sir Humphrey Stafford – military commander
- William Stafford – Sir Humphrey's brother (Note: Based on William Stafford (died 1450) of Southwick, Wiltshire, actually Sir Humphrey Stafford's second cousin)
- Lord Saye – Lord High Treasurer
- Lord Scales – defends the Tower of London
- Matthew Gough – King's soldier stationed at the Tower (non-speaking role)
- Alexander Iden – Kentish Gentleman

Others

- Vaux – messenger
- Messengers, soldiers, guards, servants, commons, rebels, etc.

== Synopsis ==
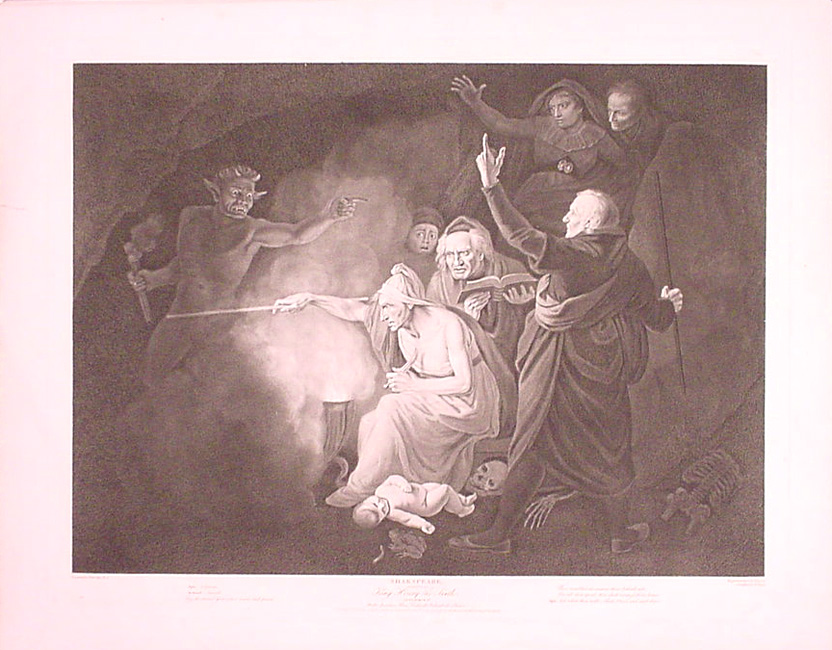
The Conjuration by John Opie (1792)

The play begins with the marriage of King Henry VI of England to the young Margaret of Anjou. Margaret is the protégée and lover of William de la Pole, 4th Earl of Suffolk, who aims to influence the king through her. The major obstacle to Suffolk and Margaret's plan is the Lord Protector, Humphrey, Duke of Gloucester, who is extremely popular with the common people and deeply trusted by the King. Gloucester's wife, however, has designs on the throne, and has been led by an agent of Suffolk to dabble in necromancy. She summons a spirit and demands it reveal the future to her, but its prophecies are vague and before the ritual is finished, she is interrupted and arrested. At court she is then banished, greatly to the embarrassment of Gloucester. Suffolk then conspires with Cardinal Beaufort and the Duke of Somerset to bring about Gloucester's ruin. Suffolk accuses Gloucester of treason and has him imprisoned, but before Gloucester can be tried, Suffolk sends two assassins to kill him. Meanwhile, Richard, 3rd Duke of York, reveals his claim to the throne (Note: He is descended from Edward III's third son, Lionel of Antwerp, whereas Henry is descended from the fourth son, John of Gaunt) to the Earls of Salisbury and Warwick, who pledge to support him.

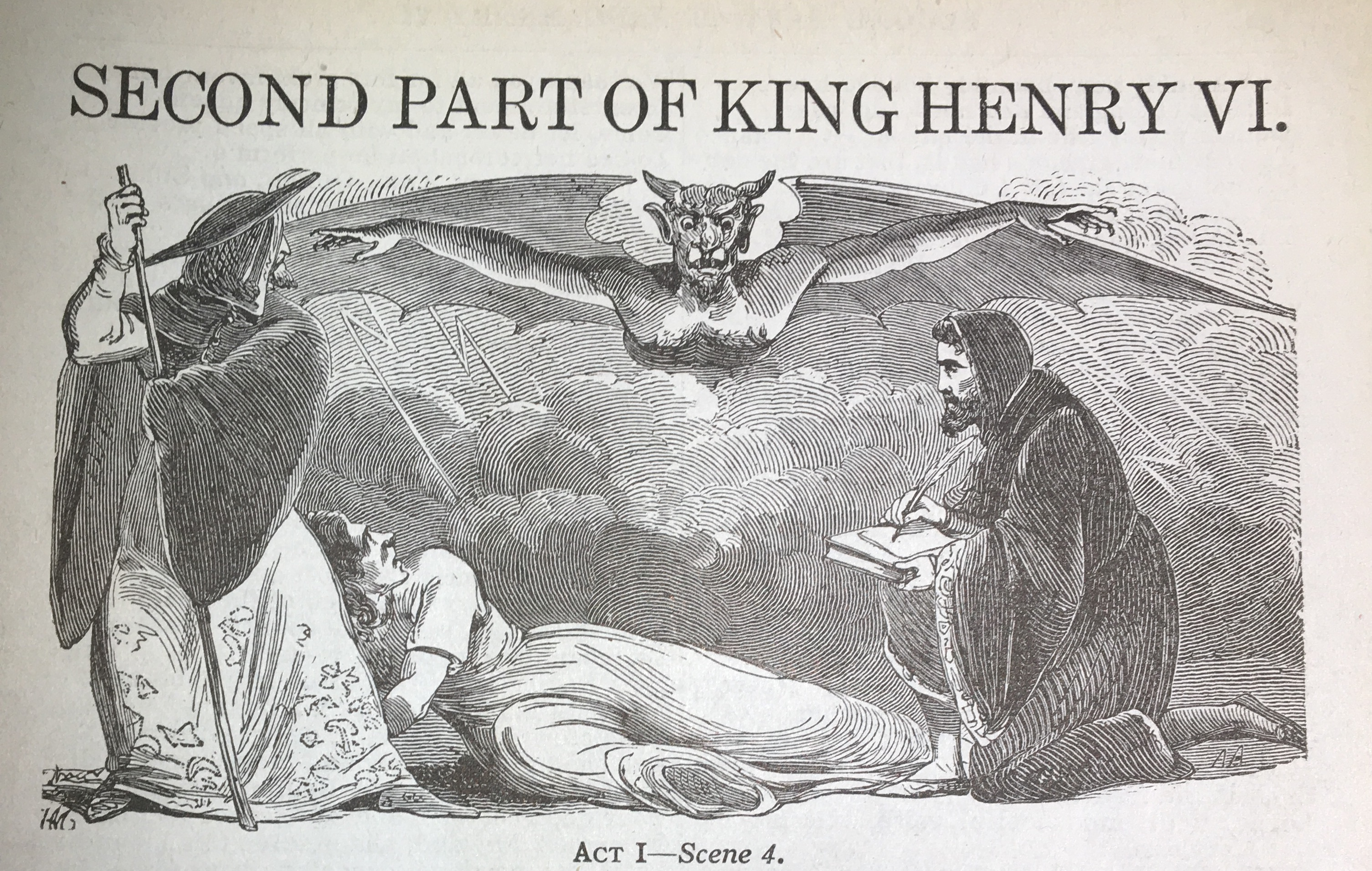
A lithograph depicting Act I Scene IV

Suffolk is banished for his role in Gloucester's death, whilst Winchester (Cardinal Beaufort) contracts a fever and dies, cursing God. Margaret, horrified at Suffolk's banishment, vows to ensure his return, but he is killed by pirates shortly after leaving England, and his head sent back to the distraught Margaret. Meanwhile, York has been appointed commander of an army to suppress a revolt in Ireland. Before leaving, he enlists a former officer of his, Jack Cade, to stage a popular revolt in order to ascertain whether the common people would support York should he make an open move for power. At first, the rebellion is successful, and Cade sets himself up as Mayor of London, but his rebellion is put down when Lord Clifford (a supporter of Henry) persuades the common people, who make up Cade's army, to abandon the cause. Cade is killed several days later by Alexander Iden, a Kentish gentleman, into whose garden he climbs looking for food.

York returns to England with his army, claiming that he intends to protect the King from the duplicitous Somerset. York vows to disband his forces if Somerset is arrested and charged with treason. Buckingham swears that Somerset is already a prisoner in the tower, but when Somerset enters ("at liberty"), accompanied by the Queen, York holds Buckingham's vow broken, and announces his claim to the throne, supported by his sons, Edward and Richard. The English nobility take sides, some supporting the House of York, others supporting Henry and the House of Lancaster. A battle is fought at St Albans in which the Duke of Somerset is killed by York's son Richard, and Lord Clifford by York. With the battle lost, Margaret persuades the distraught King to flee the battlefield and head to London. She is joined by Young Clifford, who vows revenge on the Yorkists for the death of his father. The play ends with York, Edward, Richard, Warwick and Salisbury setting out in pursuit of Henry, Margaret and Clifford.

== Sources ==
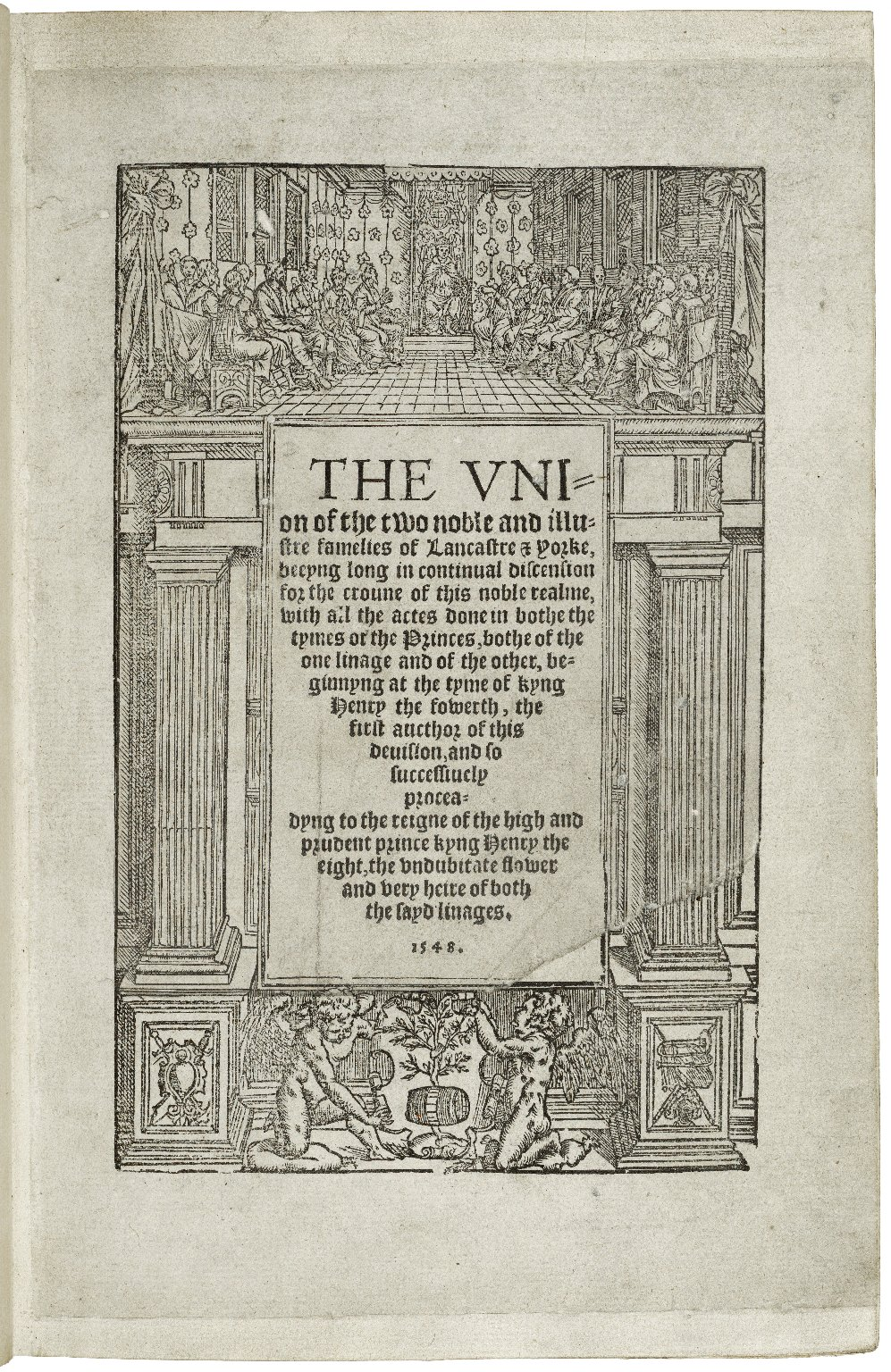
Title page from the 1550 edition of Edward Hall's The Union of the Two Noble and Illustre Families of Lancaster and York

Shakespeare's primary source for 2 Henry VI was Edward Hall's The Union of the Two Noble and Illustre Families of Lancaster and York (1548). He also drew upon the second edition of Raphael Holinshed's Chronicles (1587). Although Holinshed's treatment of the Wars of the Roses is derived in large part from Hall's work, even to the point of reproducing large portions of it verbatim, there are enough differences between Hall and Holinshed to establish that Shakespeare must have consulted both of them.

For example, the marked contrast between Henry and Margaret, a recurring theme in the play, comes from Hall, who presents Henry as a "saint-like" victim of circumstances, and Margaret as a cunning and manipulative egotist. Shakespeare must have used Hall to establish York's claim to the throne (outlined in 2.2), as the corresponding section in Holinshed adds an extra generation to York's lineage. However, the meeting between Buckingham and York before the Battle of St Albans (dramatised in 5.1) is found only in Holinshed.

Only Holinshed contains information about the Peasants' Revolt of 1381, which Shakespeare used for the scenes of Cade's rebellion throughout Act 4 (for example, details such as having people killed because they could read, and promises of setting up a state with no money). The Peasants' Revolt of 1381 was highly anti-intellectual and anti-textual as well, an aspect that Shakespeare used to characterize his version of Cade's Rebellion (while in reality, Cade's Rebellion was one of the first popular uprisings in England that used writing to voice their grievances). The presentation of Henry's reaction to the rebellion also differs in Hall and Holinshed. In Hall, Henry pardons everyone who surrenders and lets them all return home unpunished, and this is how Shakespeare presents it in the play. In Holinshed, by contrast, Henry convenes a court and has several of the leaders executed (as he did in reality). Another historical parallel found in Holinshed is that Henry is presented as unstable, constantly on the brink of madness, something which is not in Hall, who presents a gentle but ineffective King (again, Shakespeare follows Hall here).

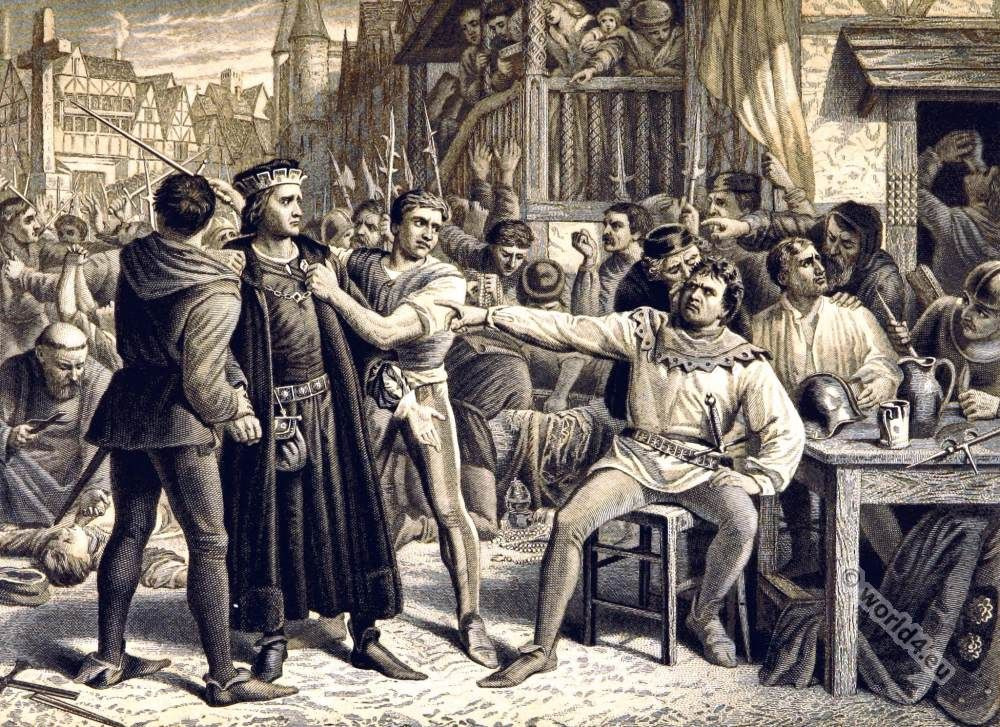
Lord Saye and Sele brought before Jack Cade 4th July 1450 by Charles Lucy (1884)

Shakespeare's largest departure from Hall and Holinshed is in his conflation of the Cade rebellion, York's return from Ireland and the Battle of St Albans into one continuous sequence. Both Hall and Holinshed present these events as covering a four-year period (as they did in reality), but in the play they are presented as one leading directly, and immediately, to the other. This is how the events are depicted in Robert Fabyan's New Chronicles of England and France (1516), suggesting that this too may have been a source.

Another definite source for Shakespeare was Richard Grafton's A Chronicle at Large (1569). Like Holinshed, Grafton reproduces large passages of unedited material from Hall, but some sections are exclusive to Grafton, showing Shakespeare must also have consulted him. The false miracle for example (dramatised in 2.1) is found only in Grafton, not in Hall or Holinshed (although a similar scene is also outlined in John Foxe's Acts and Monuments, Book of Martyrs (1563), with which Shakespeare may have been familiar).

== Date and text ==
=== Date ===
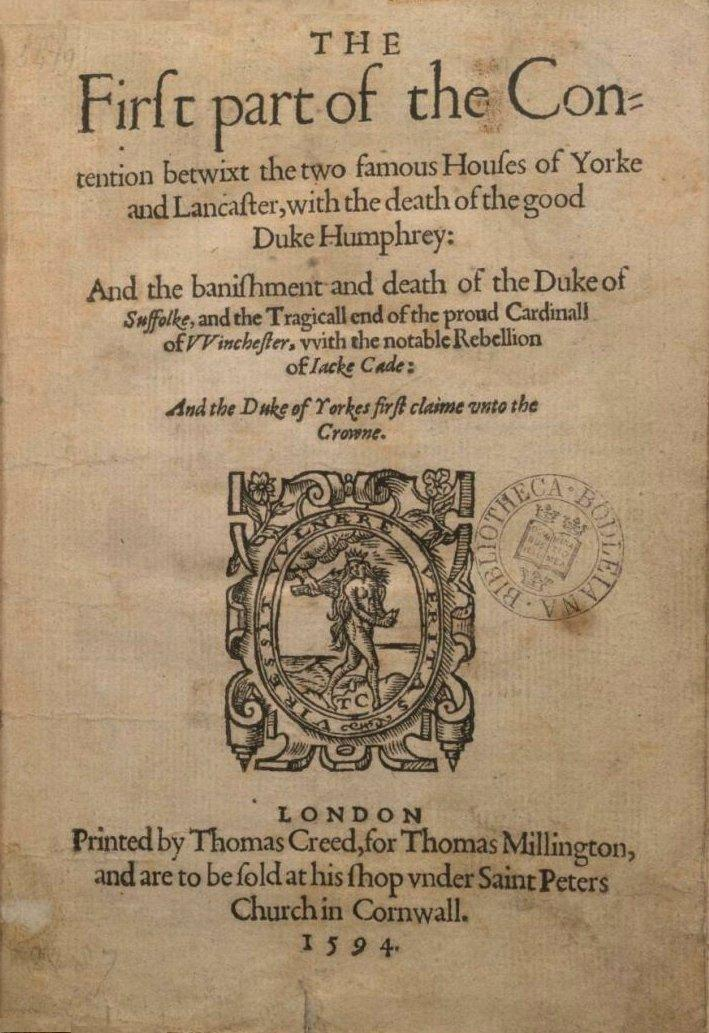
Title page of the first quarto (1594)

On 12 March 1594, a play was entered in the Stationers' Register by the bookseller Thomas Millington and printed in quarto by Thomas Creede later that year as The First part of the Contention betwixt the two famous Houses of Yorke and Lancaster, with the death of the good Duke Humphrey: And the banishment and death of the Duke of Suffolke, and the Tragicall end of the proud Cardinall of VVinchester, vvith the notable Rebellion of Jacke Cade: And the Duke of Yorkes first claime vnto the Crowne. (Note: Hereafter The Contention.) It has been theorised that The Contention is a reported text of a performance of what is today called Henry VI, Part II. If so, the play was written no later than 1594.

However, it has been suggested the play may have been written several years earlier. Robert Greene's pamphlet Greene's Groats-Worth of Wit (entered in the Stationers' Register on 20 September 1592) mocks Shakespeare as "an upstart crow, beautified with our feathers, that with his 'tiger's heart wrapped in a player's hide', supposes that he is as well able to bombast out a blank verse as the best of you." This parody of 3 Henry VI, 1.4.138, where York refers to Margaret as a "tiger's heart wrapped in a woman's hide!", proves that 3 Henry VI was well known by September 1592, which means it must have been staged before 23 June, when the government closed the theatres to prevent the spread of plague. As it is known for certain that 3 Henry VI was a sequel to 2 Henry VI, it is certain that if 3 Henry VI was on stage by June 1592, so too was 2 Henry VI and that both were probably written in 1591 or 1592.

For a discussion of whether the three parts of the trilogy were composed in chronological order, see 1 Henry VI.

=== Text ===
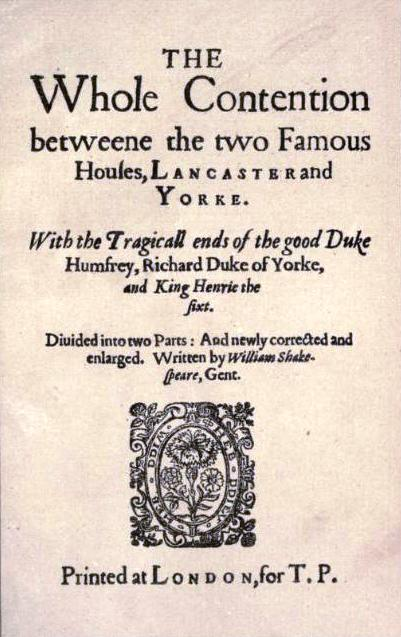
Title page of The Whole Contention (1619)

The 1594 quarto text of The Contention was reprinted twice, in 1600 (in quarto) and 1619 (also in quarto). The 1600 text was printed by Valentine Simmes for Millington. The 1619 text was part of William Jaggard's False Folio, which was printed for Thomas Pavier. This text was printed together with a version of 3 Henry VI which had been printed in octavo in 1595 under the title The True Tragedie of Richard Duke of Yorke, and the death of good King Henrie the Sixt, with the Whole Contention betweene the two Houses, Lancaster and Yorke. (Note: Hereafter True Tragedy.) In the False Folio, the two plays were grouped under the general title The Whole Contention betweene the Two Famous Houses, Lancaster and Yorke, With the Tragicall ends of the good Duke Humfrey, Richard Duke of Yorke, and King Henrie the sixt. Also printed with The Whole Contention was Pericles, Prince of Tyre. The 1619 text of 2 Henry VI was not directly taken from The Contention, however. The original text was edited to correct an error in York's outline of his genealogy in 2.2.

The text of the play that today forms 2 Henry VI was not published until the 1623 First Folio, under the title The second Part of Henry the Sixt, with the death of the Good Duke Humfrey.

When the play came to be called Part 2 is unclear, although most critics tend to assume it was the invention of John Heminges and Henry Condell, the editors of the First Folio, as there are no references to the play under the title Part 2, or any derivative thereof, before 1623.

== Analysis and criticism ==
=== Critical history ===
Some critics argue that the Henry VI trilogy was the first ever plays to be based on recent English history, and as such, they deserve an elevated position in the canon and a more central role in Shakespearean criticism. According to F. P. Wilson, "There is no certain evidence that any dramatist before the defeat of the Spanish Armada in 1588 dared to put upon the public stage a play based upon English history [... so that] so far as we know, Shakespeare was the first." Michael Taylor, however, argues that there were at least thirty-nine history plays prior to 1592, including the two-part Christopher Marlowe play Tamburlaine (1587), Thomas Lodge's The Wounds of Civil War (1588), George Peele's The Troublesome Reign of King John (1588), the anonymous Edmund Ironside (1590), Robert Green, and Thomas Lodge's Selimus (1591), and another anonymous play, The True Tragedy of Richard III (1591). Paola Pugliatti attempts a synthesis, arguing, "Shakespeare may not have been the first to bring English history before the audience of a public playhouse, but he was certainly the first to treat it in the manner of a mature historian rather than in the manner of a worshipper of historical, political and religious myth."

In any case, there is much more critical disagreement about the play, not the least of which concerns its relationship to The Contention.

==== The Contention as reported text ====
Over the years, critics have debated the connection between 2 Henry VI and The Contention, to the point where four main theories have emerged:

1. The Contention is a reconstructed version of a performance of what we today call 2 Henry VI; i.e. a bad quarto, an attempt by actors to reconstruct the original play from memory and sell it. Originated by Samuel Johnson in 1765 and refined by Peter Alexander in 1929. Traditionally, this is the most accepted theory.
2. The Contention is an early draft of the play that was published in the 1623 Folio under the title The second Part of Henry the Sixt. Originated by Edmond Malone in 1790 as an alternate to Johnson's memorial report theory. Supported today by critics such as Steven Urkowitz.
3. The Contention is both a reported text and an early draft of 2 Henry VI. (Note: That is to say it is the reported text of the staging of an early draft of the play.) This theory has been gaining increasing support from the latter half of the 20th century, and is championed by many modern editors of the play.
4. Shakespeare did not write The Contention at all; it was an anonymous play which he used as the basis for 2 Henry VI. Originated by Georg Gottfried Gervinus in 1849, this theory remained popular throughout the nineteenth century, with Robert Greene the leading candidate as a possible author. It has fallen out of favour in the twentieth century.

Traditionally, critical opinion has tended to favour the first theory; that The Contention is a bad quarto, a memorial reconstruction, perhaps by the actor who had played Suffolk and/or Cade in early performance. Samuel Johnson put forth this theory in 1765, but was challenged by Edmond Malone in 1790, who suggested that The Contention could be an early draft of 2 Henry VI. Malone's view was the dominant one until 1929, when Peter Alexander and Madeleine Doran, working independently of one another, re-established the dominance of the bad quarto theory.

They focused on a genealogical error in The Contention, which they argue seems unlikely to have been made by an author, and is therefore only attributable to a reporter. In The Contention, when York sets out his claim to the throne, he identifies Edmund of Langley as Edward III's second son, instead of his fifth. In 2 Henry VI, Langley is correctly placed in the genealogy. This error renders unnecessary York's need to claim the throne through his mother's ancestry: were he descended from the second son, he himself would be descended directly from an elder son than Henry. It has been argued that "no one who understood what he was writing—that is, no author—could have made this error, but someone parroting someone else's work, of which he himself had but a dim understanding—that is, a reporter—easily could."

Act 3, Scene 1, has been pinpointed as another scene which provides evidence that The Contention is a reported text. In The Contention, after the court has turned on Gloucester, Suffolk then illogically switches back to discussing the regentship of France. Horner and Thump are introduced and Gloucester arranges for them to formally duel. At this point, Gloucester leaves, but without any discernible reason. Margaret then strikes Eleanor, Gloucester returns, and he and his wife leave together. Steven Urkowitz (a staunch opponent of the theory of bad quartos in general) argues that the difference in the two scenes is an example of "the finely Shakespearean first choices recorded in the Quarto." Roger Warren, however, argues that the scene provides strong evidence that The Contention is a reported text; "it is not hard to conjecture how the Quarto's version came about. The conflicting claims of York and Somerset led to the Armourer and his Man being introduced too soon; whoever was compiling the Quarto text remembered that Humphrey left the stage, though not why, but did remember that while he was offstage Margaret struck his wife. The utterly unmotivated exit and reappearance of Humphrey in itself rules out any possibility that the Quarto's scene is a legitimate alternative to the Folio version, rather than a confused report of it."

Further evidence for the reported text theory is provided in how other plays are used throughout The Contention. For example, the line from Marlowe's The Tragical History of Doctor Faustus "Now Faustus, what wouldst thou have me do?" (1.3.36) is reproduced as "Now Bolingbroke, what wouldst thou have me do?", while Marlowe's "The wild O'Neill, with swarms of Irish kerns, / Lives uncontrolled within the English pale" (2.2.163–164) from Edward II is paraphrased in Act 3, Scene 1, as "The wild O'Neill, my lords, is up in arms,/ With troops of Irish kerns that uncontrolled / Doth plant themselves within the English pale". Even a line from 3 Henry VI ("If our King Henry had shook hands with death" (1.4.103)) appears in Act 3, Scene 1, all of which suggests that, as is so often the case in the bad quartos, the reporter was filling in blanks (i.e. passages he could not remember) with extracts from other plays.

==== The Contention as early draft ====
Steven Urkowitz has spoken at great length about the debate between the bad quarto theory and the early draft theory, coming down firmly on the side of the early draft. Urkowitz argues that the quarto of 2 Henry VI and the octavo of 3 Henry VI actually present scholars with a unique opportunity to see a play evolving, as Shakespeare edited and rewrote certain sections; "the texts of 2 and 3 Henry VI offer particularly rich illustrations of textual variation and theatrical transformation." Urkowitz cites the dialogue in the opening scene of 2 Henry VI as especially strong evidence of the early draft theory. In The Contention, Henry receives Margaret with joy and an exclamation that all his worldly troubles are behind him. Margaret is then depicted as utterly humble, vowing to love the King no matter what. After the initial meeting then, Henry asks Margaret to sit beside him before bidding the Lords to stand nearby and welcome her. In 2 Henry VI, on the other hand, Henry is more cautious in greeting Margaret, seeing her as a relief for his problems, but only if she and he can find common ground and love one another. She herself is also much bolder and self-congratulatory in 2 Henry VI than in The Contention. Additionally, in 2 Henry VI there is no reference to anyone sitting, and the lords kneel before speaking to Margaret. Urkowitz summarises these differences by arguing,

In the visible geometry of courtly ceremony, the Folio version offers us a bold Queen Margaret and an exuberant king who stands erect while the visibly subordinated nobles kneel before them. In contrast to the modest queen seated beside the king surrounded by standing nobles, in this text at the equivalent moment, we have an assertive queen standing upright with her monarch, visibly subordinating the kneeling, obedient lords. Distinct theatrical representations of psychological and political tensions distinguish the two versions of the passage. Both texts "work" by leading an audience through an elaborate ceremonial display fraught with symbolic gestures of emotional attachment, sanctification, regal authority, and feudal obedience, but each displays a distinct pattern of language and coded gestures. Such fine-tuning of dramatic themes and actions are staples of professional theatrical writing.

The differences in the texts are of the sort one tends to find in texts that were altered from an original form, and Urkowitz cites Eric Rasmussen, E. A. J. Honigmann, and Grace Ioppolo as supporting this view. He refers to the case of Richard Brinsley Sheridan's The School for Scandal (1777), which existed in an earlier form, also by Sheridan, in a two-part play The Slanderers and Sir Peter Teazel, which he argues contain the same type of modifications as is found in the Henry VI plays.

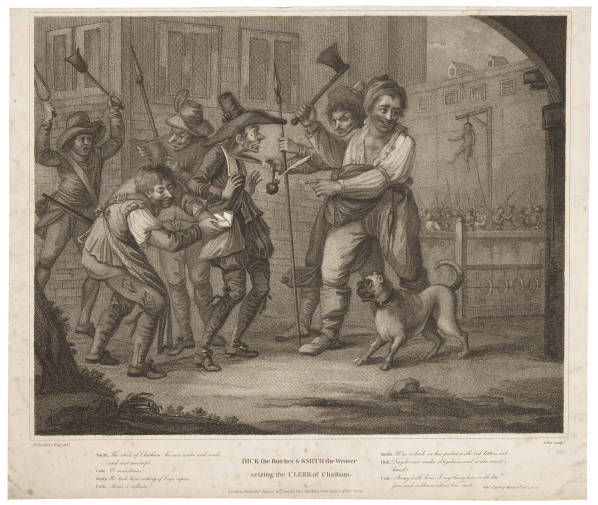
Dick the Butcher & Smith the Weaver seizing the Clerk of Chatham by Henry William Bunbury (1795)

Urkowitz is not alone in finding evidence to support the early draft theory. For example, in The Contention, Margery Jourdayne is referred to as "the cunning witch of Ely", but in 2 Henry VI she is referred to merely as "the cunning witch." The traditional argument to explain this disparity is that such information was added by either Shakespeare or someone else during rehearsals, but was not found in the prompt book which was used to print the First Folio. However, R. B. McKerrow argues against the likelihood of this theory. He asks why a writer would go back to a chronicle source to add a piece of information which is of no importance dramatically, and brings nothing to the scene. McKerrow suggests that the line was cut after performance. A similar example is found in Act 4, Scene 7, where Cade orders his men to kill Lord Saye and Sir James Comer. In 2 Henry VI, Cade orders them to cut off Saye's head and then go to Cromer's house and kill him, but in The Contention, he tells them to bring Saye to "Standard in Cheapside", and then go to Cromer's house in "Mile End Green." McKerrow argues that such unimportant detail suggests removal after performance rather than addition before performance.

More evidence is found in Act 2, Scene 1. In The Contention, after Winchester has accepted Gloucester's challenge to a duel (l. 38; "Marry, when thou dar'est"), there is additional dialogue not found in 2 Henry VI;

GLOUCESTER
Dare? I tell thee priest,
Plantagenets could never brook the dare.

WINCHESTER
I am Plantagenet as well as thou,
And son of John of Gaunt.

GLOUCESTER
In bastardy.

WINCHESTER
I scorn thy words.

Again, McKerrow's argument here is not that these lines were added during rehearsals, but that they existed in an early draft of the play and were removed after rehearsals, as they were simply deemed unnecessary; the animosity between the two had already been well established.

However, the theory that The Contention may be an early draft does not necessarily imply that it could not also represent a bad quarto. Traditionally, most critics (such as Alexander, Doran, McKerrow and Urkowitz) have looked at the problem as an either–or situation; The Contention is either a reported text or an early draft, but recently there has been some argument that it may be both. For example, this is the theory supported by Roger Warren in his Oxford Shakespeare edition of the play. It is also the theory advanced by Randall Martin in his Oxford Shakespeare edition of 3 Henry VI. The crux of the argument is that both the evidence for the bad quarto theory and the evidence for the early draft theory are so compelling that neither is able to completely refute the other. As such, if the play contains evidence of being both a reported text and an early draft, it must be both; i.e. The Contention represents a reported text of an early draft of 2 Henry VI. Shakespeare wrote an early version of the play, which was staged. Shortly after that staging, some of the actors constructed a bad quarto from it and had it published. In the meantime, Shakespeare had rewritten the play into the form found in the First Folio. Warren argues that this is the only theory which can account for the strong evidence for both reporting and revision, and it is a theory which is gaining increased support in the late twentieth/early twenty-first century.

=== Language ===
Language, throughout the play, helps to establish the theme as well as the tone of each particular episode. For example, the opening speech of the play is an ornate, formal declaration by Suffolk:

As by your high imperial majesty
I had in charge at my depart for France,
As Procurator to your excellence,
To marry Princess Margaret for your grace,
So in the famous ancient city Tours,
In presence of the Kings of France and Sicil,
The Dukes of Orléans, Calabre, Bretagne, and Alençon,
Seven earls, twelve barons, and twenty reverend bishops,
I have performed my task and was espoused,
And humbly now upon my bended knee,
In sight of England and her lordly peers,
Deliver up my title in the Queen
To your most gracious hands, that are the substance
Of that great shadow I did represent:
The happiest gift that ever marquis gave,
The fairest queen that ever king received.
(1.1.1–16)

The substance of Suffolk's speech is "As I was instructed to marry Margaret on your behalf, I did so, and now I deliver her to you." However, the formality of the scene and the importance of the event require him to deliver this message in heightened language, with the formal significance of Henry's marriage to Margaret mirrored in the formal language used by Suffolk to announce that marriage.

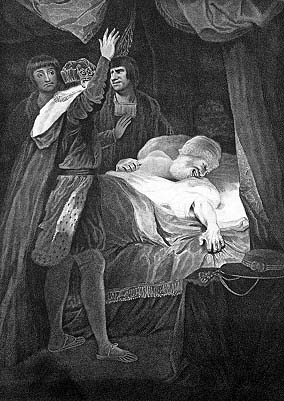
Cardinal Beaufort's Bedchamber by Joshua Reynolds (1788)

Language conveys the importance of religion throughout the play. Henry's language often echoes the Bible. For example, hearing of the Cade rebellion, he comments "Ο graceless men, they know not what they do" (4.4.37), echoing the Gospel of Luke: "Father, forgive them: for they know not what they do" (23:34). Earlier in the play, he refers to heaven as "the treasury of everlasting joy" (2.1.18), recalling the Gospel of Matthew's "lay up treasures for yourselves in heaven" (6:20), and then a few lines later he muses "blessèd are the peacemakers on earth" (2.1.34), echoing Jesus' Sermon on the Mount. On both of these occasions, however, Cardinal Winchester, ostensibly a pious man, distorts Henry's genuine piety. After Henry's assessment of heaven, Winchester says to Gloucester, "Thy heaven is on earth, thine eyes and thoughts/Beat on a crown, the treasure of thy heart" (2.1.19–20). Then, after Henry praises peacemakers, Winchester hypocritically says, "Let me be blessèd for the peace I make,/Against this proud Protector with my sword" (2.1.35–36). The Cardinal mocks religion shortly before the murder of Gloucester. Speaking of the forthcoming murder, Suffolk says, "And to preserve my sovereign from his foe,/Say but the word and I will be his priest" (3.1.271–272), to which Winchester responds "But I would have him dead, my Lord of Suffolk,/Ere you can take due orders for a priest" (3.1.273–274), disdaining priesthood and trivialising murder. After Gloucester is dead, Winchester continues to blaspheme himself, proclaiming the death of Gloucester to be "God's secret judgement" (3.2.31), a callous and knowing distortion.

Shakespeare uses language to distinguish between different types of characters. The courtly scenes tend to be spoken in blank verse, whereas the commons tend to speak in prose, with fewer metaphors and less decorative language (Shakespeare uses this contrast in several plays, such as The Two Gentlemen of Verona, where prose marks the servants out from their masters). When power begins to go to Jack Cade's head, he begins to slip into a more courtly way of speaking. This is most noticeable in his adoption of the 'royal we', using phrases such as "our jurisdiction regal" (4.7.24), and "we charge and command" (4.7.116).

The longest speech in the play is Margaret's lament to Henry after they have found Gloucester's dead body. This lengthy speech is full of classical allusions, elaborate metaphors and verbosity as Margaret moves through a litany of topics in an effort to make her point:

Be woe for me, more wretched than he is.
What, dost thou turn away and hide thy face?
I am no loathsome leper, look on me.
What, art thou like the adder waxen deaf?
Be poisonous too and kill thy forlorn queen.
Is all thy comfort shut in Gloucester's tomb?
Why then Queen Margaret was ne'er thy joy.
Erect his statua and worship it,
And make my image but an alehouse sign.
Was I for this nigh wracked upon the sea,
And twice by awkward winds from England's bank
Drove back again unto my native clime?
What boded this, but well forewarning winds
Did seem to say, 'Seek not a scorpion's nest,
Nor set no footing on this unkind shore'?
What did I then, but cursed the gentle gusts
And he that loosed them forth their brazen caves,
And bid them blow towards England's blessèd shore,
Or turn our stern upon a dreadful rock?
Yet Aeolus would not be a murderer,
But left that hateful office unto thee.
The pretty vaulting sea refused to drown me,
Knowing that thou wouldst have me drowned on shore
With tears as salt as sea through thy unkindness.
The splitting rocks cow'red in the sinking sands,
And would not dash me with their ragged sides,
Because thy flinty heart, more hard than they,
Might in thy palace perish Margaret.
As far as I could ken thy chalky cliffs,
When from thy shore the tempest beat us back,
I stood upon the hatches in the storm,
And when the dusky sky began to rob
My earnest-gaping sight of thy land's view,
I took a costly jewel from my neck—
A heart it was, bound in with diamonds—
And threw it towards thy land. The sea received it,
And so I wished thy body might my heart.
And even with this I lost fair England's view,
And bid mine eyes be packing with my heart,
And called them blind and dusky spectacles,
For losing ken of Albion's wishèd coast.
How often have I tempted Suffolk's tongue—
The agent of thy foul inconstancy—
To sit and witch me, as Ascanius did,
When he to madding Dido would unfold
His father's acts, commenced in burning Troy!
Am I not witched like her? Or thou not false like him?
Ay me, I can no more. Die Margaret,
For Henry weeps that thou dost live so long.
(3.2.73–121)

There is some debate amongst critics as to the meaning and purpose of this speech, although all tend to agree that the meaning is inherently tied up in the elaborate language. Some critics (such as Stanley Wells) argue that the speech, with its wordiness, abstraction, strained allusions, and lengthy metaphors, is poorly written, evidence that Shakespeare was not yet in control of his medium. Proponents of this theory point to The Contention, where only seven lines are retained, with the argument being that the rest of the speech was cut from performance. L.C. Knights, by contrast, argues that the speech is deliberately excessive and highly-wrought because Margaret is trying to deflect the already confused and dejected Henry from accusing Suffolk of the murder.

Peter Hall suggested that "the speech is there to establish the emotional, hysterical side of Margaret's nature. I think that is why the language gets so extremely elaborate—it is an attempt by Margaret to contain her turbulent emotions by expressing them in such a strange way."

The complete antithesis of this theory has also been suggested as a possibility: that the speech shows not that Margaret is losing control, but that she is completely in control of herself and her emotions. This theory is most noticeable in how director Jane Howell had Julia Foster act the part in the 1981 BBC Television Shakespeare adaptation. (Note: The adaptation was shot in 1981, but was not aired until 1983.) Here, Margaret uses her speech to vent her intense emotions, not to contain them. The far ranging metaphors and classical allusions are her way of letting go of her pent up rage and emotion, her disdain for Henry and her inherent passion.

In Terry Hands' 1977 production for the Royal Shakespeare Company, Margaret (played by Helen Mirren) tried to bring Henry back from the brink of madness by engaging his mind in an elaborate, difficult to follow verbal dance. Henry's preceding speech to Suffolk, where he demands Suffolk not look at him, and then immediately demands that he wants to look into Suffolk's eyes was played by Alan Howard in such a way as to suggest that Henry was losing his grip on reality, and in response to this, Mirren played the speech in such a way as to engage Henry's mind in the here and now, focus his thoughts and prevent them drifting away.

=== Themes ===
==== Henry's weakness ====
A major theme of the play is Henry's inherent weakness and his inability to control the country or even his own court. According to Martin, Henry's weakness as king was the main reason that many nineteenth century critics judged 2 Henry VI to lack emotion: Henry was so inept that audiences could not empathise with him, and hence, his tragedy was diminished. There are numerous examples throughout the play which such critics could have focused on. For example, Henry fails to unite his bickering nobles, and instead allows them to push him around as they decide for themselves how to act and what to do, and at the same time, he allows himself to be utterly dominated by Margaret. He is so subservient that he consents to the imprisonment of a man (Gloucester) he loves and knows to be innocent, and then attempts to hide from the implications of this decision, trying to leave the court after Gloucester's arrest:

KING HENRY
My lords, what to your wisdoms seemeth best
Do or undo, as if ourself were here.

QUEEN MARGARET
What, will your highness leave the parliament?

KING HENRY
Ay Margaret, my heart is drowned with grief,
Whose flood begins to flow within mine eyes.
(3.1.195–199)

This leads Henry to a realisation of how he has failed Gloucester, and to lament his own lack of decisiveness and resolution:

And as the butcher takes away the calf,
And binds the wretch, and beats it when it strains,
Bearing it to the bloody slaughterhouse,
Even so remorseless have they borne him hence;
And as the dam runs lowing up and down,
Looking the way her harmless young one went,
And can do naught but wail her darling's loss,
Even so myself bewails good Gloucester's case
With sad unhelpful tears, and with dimmed eyes
Look after him, and cannot do him good,
So mighty are his vowèd enemies.
(3.1.210–220)

Another example of his weakness as ruler is seen in his utter indifference to the vital decision of choosing a new French regent; as Somerset and York debate the issue, each trying to convince Henry that they should be the one to get the job, Henry dismissively declares, "For my part, noble Lords, I care not which:/Or Somerset or York, all's one to me" (1.3.102–103). This lack of concern is forcibly emphasised when Somerset later tells Henry that all French territories have been lost, and Henry responds nonchalantly, "Cold news, Lord Somerset; but God's will be done" (3.1.86). His lack of decisive leadership is even referred to by others; Margaret claims that "Henry my lord is cold in great affairs,/Too full of foolish pity" (3.1.224–225). Later, when the Irish post appears with news of rebellion, York says he will do whatever Henry deems necessary, to which Suffolk responds "Why, our authority is his consent,/And what we do establish he confirms" (3.1.316–317).

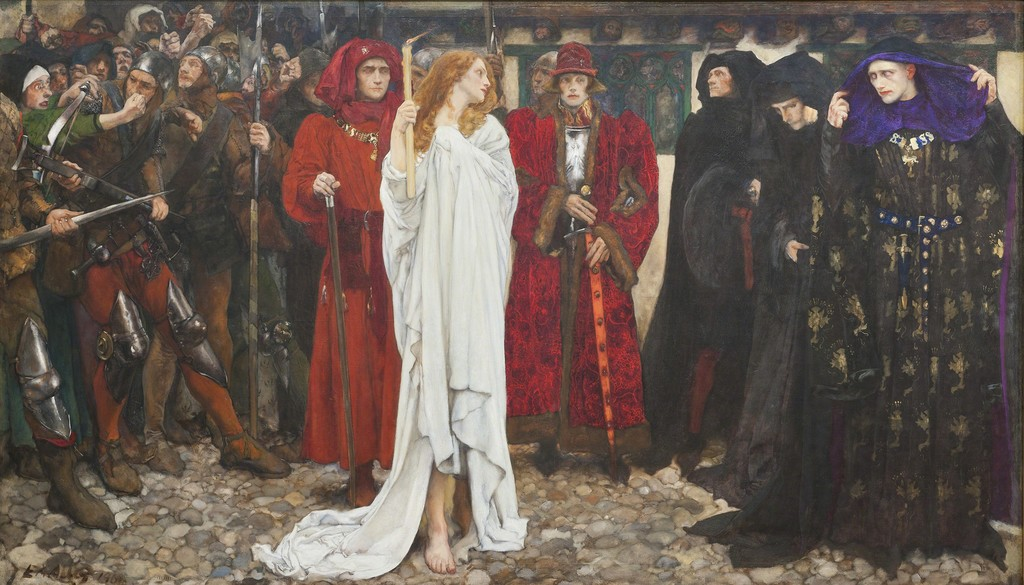
The Penance of Eleanor, Duchess of Gloucester by Edwin Austin Abbey (1900)

Henry is presented as a good man, but a poor king, to whom Roger Warren refers as "a man of deep religious conviction but no political acumen." He is a weak leader, and it is partly his failure to assert his authority that is responsible for the chaos that takes over the country. As director Peter Hall says, "In theory, Henry should be a good king. He applies Christian ethics to government. But he is up against men who don't. They justify their behaviour by invoking the great sanctions—God, the King, Parliament, the People—that unscrupulous statesmen, motivated by the naked desire to be on top, have used throughout the ages. Here is the central irony of the play: Henry's Christian goodness produces evil."

==== Contrast between Henry and Margaret ====
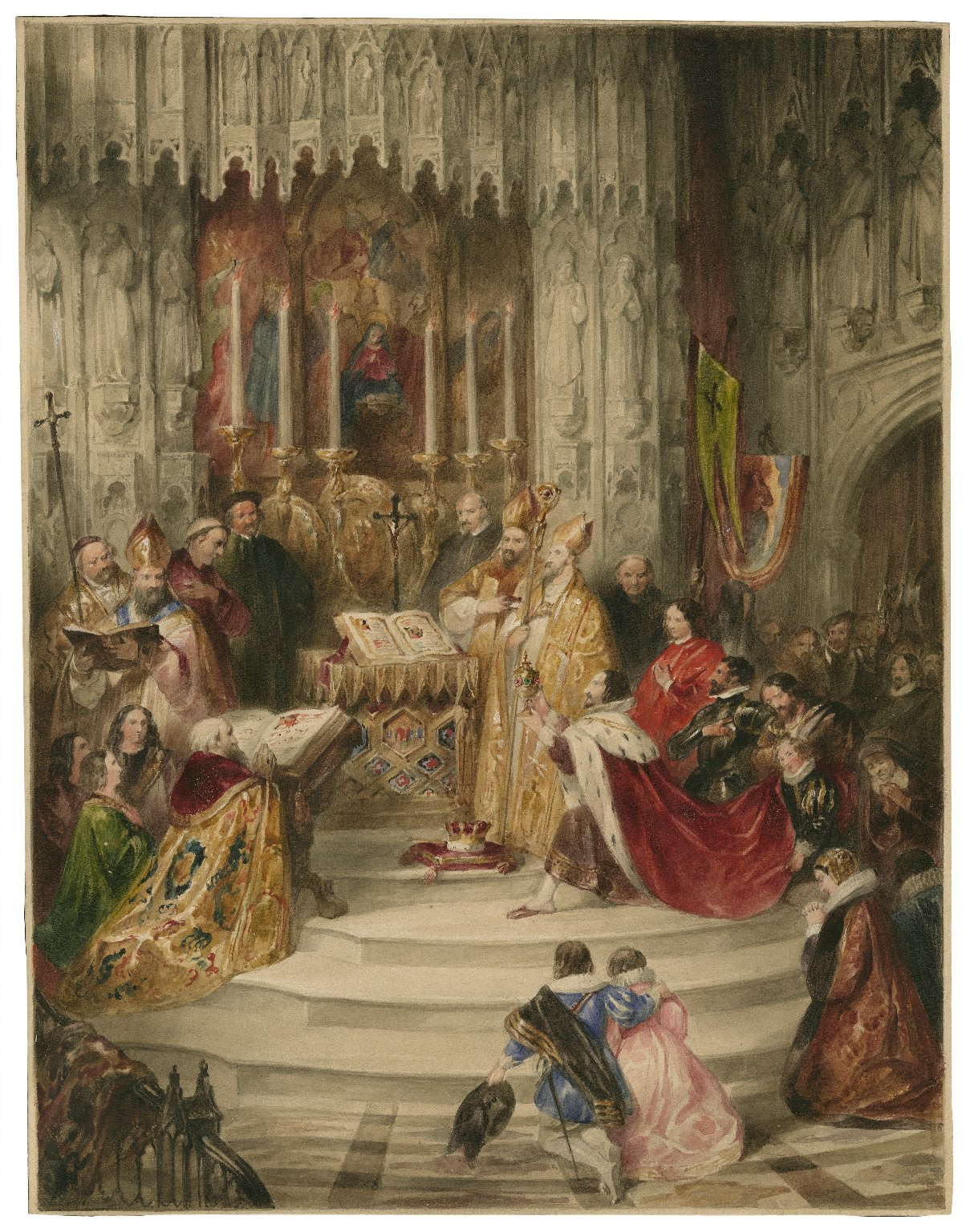
The Marriage of King Henry and Queen Margaret by James Stephanoff (19th century).

Another major theme throughout the play is the contrast between Margaret and Henry, something which is introduced when they first meet. Henry thanks God for bringing Margaret to him, and exclaims "For thou hast given me in this beauteous face/A world of earthly blessing to my soul,/If sympathy of love unite our thoughts" (1.1.21–23). The irony here, much commented on by critics, is that this unity is exactly what does not happen—their thoughts never unite, and their contrasting and incompatible attitudes are seen time and again throughout the play. For example, after the false miracle, Henry is distraught and laments, "O God, seest thou this and bear'st so long?" (2.1.150), while Margaret's response is much more mundane; "It made me laugh to see the villain run" (2.1.151). When Buckingham arrives to bring news to Henry of Eleanor's dabbling in necromancy, Henry's reaction is pious and sorrowful, "O God, what mischiefs work the wicked ones,/Heaping confusion on their heads thereby" (2.1.181–182). Margaret's response, however, is combative, using the news to forward her own agenda; "Gloucester, see here the tainture of thy nest,/And look thyself be faultless, thou wert best" (2.1.183–184). Later, when Horner and Thump are about to fight, Henry sees the contest as a sacred point of honour: "A God's name, see the lists and all things fit;/Here let them end it, and God defend the right" (2.3.54–55). Margaret, however, is simply looking forward to a fight; "For purposely therefore,/Left I the court to see this quarrel tried" (2.3.52–53). Henry is "fatally married to his polar opposite."

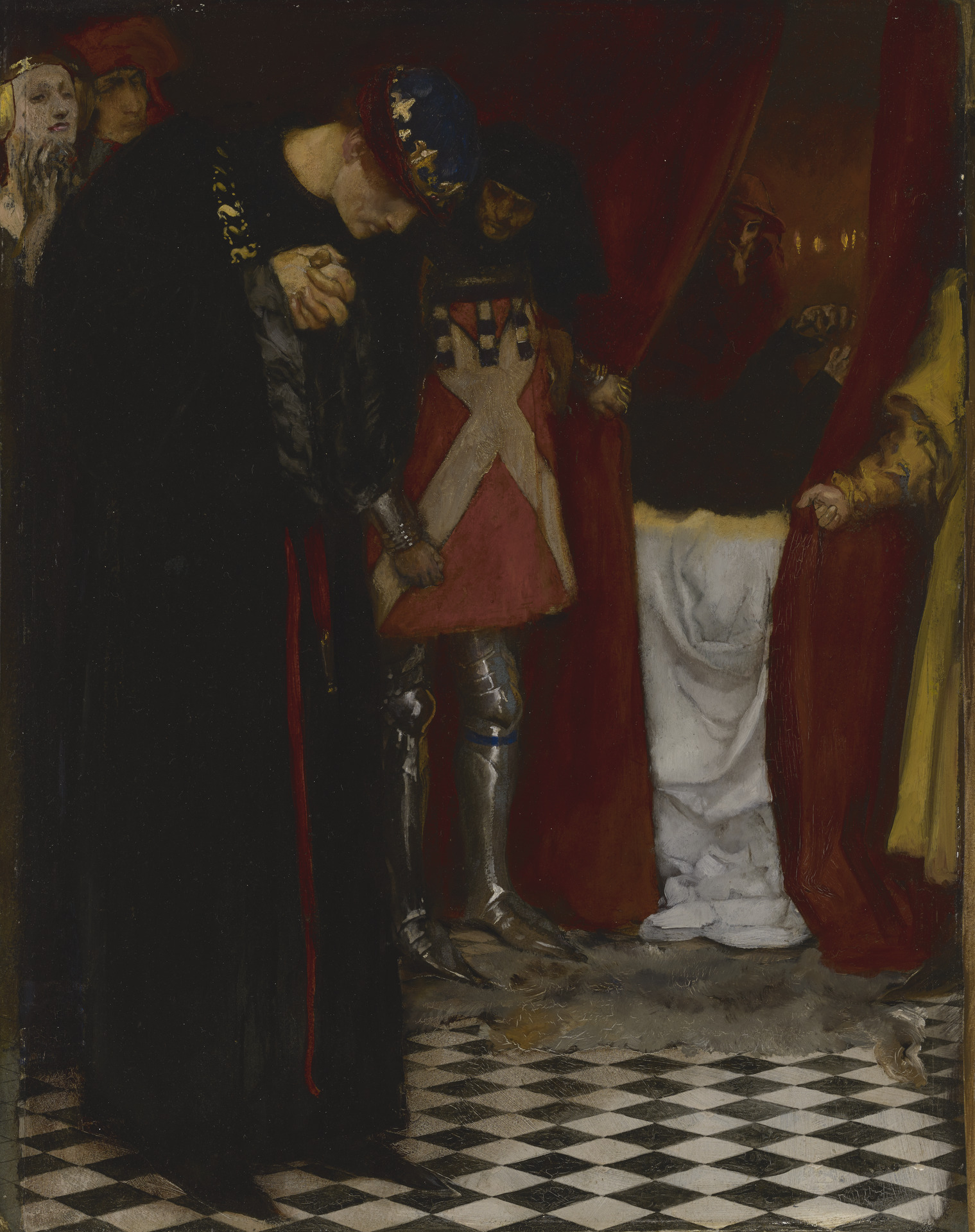
‘Come hither, gracious sovereign, view this body’, King Henry VI, Part II, Act III, Scene II (1891) by Edwin Austin Abbey

The contrast between them is perhaps most forcibly realised when Gloucester dies in Act 3, Scene 2. Margaret makes a speech in which she points out how it is unfair to accuse Suffolk of the murder simply because Suffolk and Gloucester were enemies, as she and Gloucester's wife were enemies too, so if Suffolk is a suspect, so should she be one as well; "Ay me unhappy,/To be a queen, and crowned with infamy" (70–71). Again, she is turning events to focus on herself. Henry, however, completely ignores her, calling out sorrowfully; "Ah, woe is me for Gloucester, wretched man" (72). This situation is repeated during the Cade rebellion, but this time they ignore one another. After the rebels deliver their terms to Henry, he tells Buckingham he will speak with Cade, but Margaret is concerned only with herself and Suffolk (whose head she is now carrying). Speaking to the head she ignores Henry's problems and exclaims, "Ah barbarous villain! Hath this lovely face/Ruled like a wandering planet over me,/And could it not enforce them to relent,/That were unworthy to behold the same?" (4.4.14–17). Henry, however, ignores this, and continues to deal with the rebel demands, saying simply, "Lord Saye, Jack Cade hath sworn to have thy head" (4.4.18). This tendency for them to ignore one another is another example of their incompatibility, their failure to unite in thoughts.

==== Religion ====
Religion is a fundamental fact of life to Henry, who is presented as truly pious. Shakespeare may have taken this aspect of Henry's character from Edward Hall's description of him: "He did abhor of his own nature, all the vices, as well of the body as of the soul; and from his very infancy he was of honest conversation and pure integrity; no knower of evil, and a keeper of all goodness; a despiser of all things which were wont to cause the minds of mortal men to slide or appair. Besides this, patience was so radicate in his heart that of all the injuries to him committed (which were no small number) he never asked vengeance nor punishment, but for that rendered to Almighty God, his Creator, hearty thanks, thinking that by this trouble and adversity his sins were to him forgotten and forgiven."

When Henry first meets Margaret, his reaction is to welcome her, and then immediately thank God for bringing her to him; "I can express no kinder sign of love/Than this kind kiss. O Lord that lends me life,/Lend me a heart replete with thankfulness!" (1.1.18–20). Hearing later of the false miracle, even before meeting Simpcox, Henry exclaims, "Now God be praised, that to believing souls/Gives light in darkness, comfort in despair" (2.1.64–65). Henry accepts the authenticity of the event without evidence, trusting in his faith that it is true and that God has performed a miracle. Later, when Henry is defending Gloucester against accusations of treason, he uses two religious images to get his point across: "Our kinsman Gloucester is as innocent/From meaning treason to our royal person/As is the sucking lamb or harmless dove" (3.1.69–71). Upon seeing the delirious Winchester, Henry exclaims "O thou eternal mover of the heavens,/Look with a gentle eye upon this wretch" (3.3.19–20). Then, after Winchester's death, Warwick comments "So bad a death argues a monstrous life", to which Henry replies "Forbear to judge, for we are sinners all" (3.3.30–31).

Henry believes that justice, truth and guilt are determined by God, not through human actions. After the fight between Horner and Thump, Henry announces,

For by his death we do perceive his guilt.
And God in justice hath revealed to us
The truth and innocence of this poor fellow,
Which he had thought to have murdered wrongfully.
(2.3.101–104)

Indeed, so devoted to God is Henry that other characters comment on it. For example, when Margaret is mockingly describing Henry to Suffolk, she says,

But all his mind is bent to holiness,
To number Ave-Maries on his beads,
His champions are the prophets and apostles,
His weapons holy saws of sacred writ,
His study is his tilt-yard, and his loves
Are brazen images of canonized saints.
I would the college of the cardinals
Would choose him Pope, and carry him to Rome,
And set the triple crown upon his head;
That were a state fit for his holiness.
(1.3.56–65)

York twice refers to Henry's piousness. First, when outlining his plan to assume power he refers to Henry as a king "Whose church-like humours fits not for a crown" (1.1.246). Then, when making his argument as to why he should be king, he says to Henry, "Thy hand is made to grasp a palmer's staff/And not to grace an awful princely sceptre" (5.1.97–98).

==== Justice ====
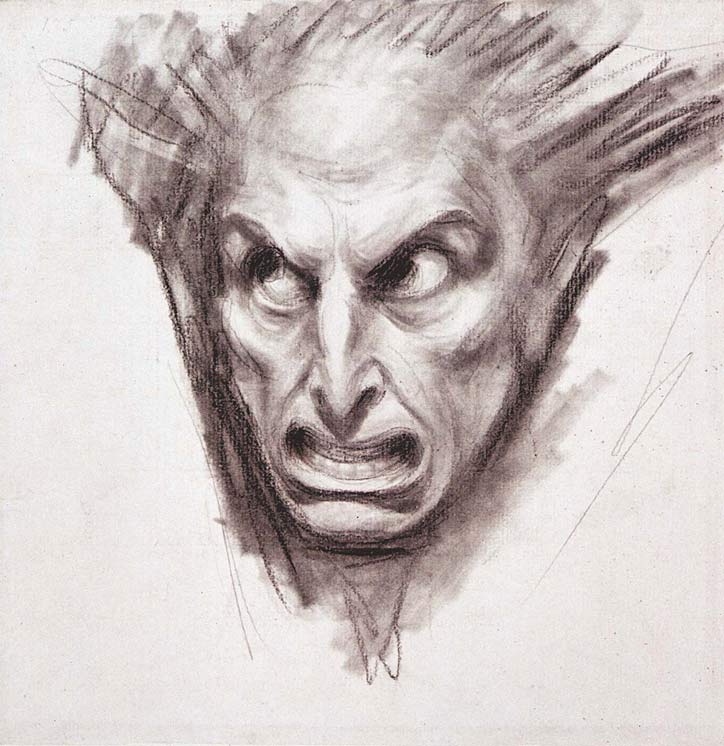
Study for a fiend's head based on Asmath from Henry VI, Part 2, by George Romney (1789)

Ideas of justice are paramount throughout the play, especially the notion of where justice comes from and who determines it. This is hinted at when Thump first meets Henry, and Henry asks Gloucester's opinion. Gloucester says,

And let these have a day appointed them
For single combat in convenient place,
For he hath witness of his servant's malice.
This is the law, and this Duke Humphrey's doom.
(1.3.208–211)

Of this scene, Michael Hattaway has commented, "the feudal ritual of trial by combat is reduced to the grotesque fights between the drunken armourer and his apprentice [...] It serves to mirror the realities of the play: instead of seeing justice determined by God with regards to the rights of the adversaries, here we see simply a trial of might." As Henry himself says,

For by his death we do perceive his guilt.
And God in justice hath revealed to us
The truth and innocence of this poor fellow,
Which he had thought to have murdered wrongfully.
(2.3.101–104)

He returns to this notion later, again arguing that truth is a defence against death and defeat:

What stronger breastplate than a heart untainted?
Thrice is he armed that hath his quarrel just;
And he but naked, though locked up in steel,
Whose conscience with injustice is corrupted.
(3.2.232–235)

Henry believes in the purity of justice, and cannot imagine how it could possibly be corrupt; "And poise the cause in justice' equal scales/Whose beam stands sure, whose rightful cause prevails" (2.1.199–200).

However, the perversion of justice is also a dominant theme throughout the play, despite Henry's inability to see it. One of the most famous lines in the play, spoken by the rebel Cade's sidekick Dick the Butcher, is "the first thing we do, let's kill all the lawyers". Whether this means that lawyers are the protectors of justice, or the agents of its corruption is disputed.

Gloucester assures Eleanor that as long as he has truth on his side, his enemies cannot destroy him: "I must offend before I be attainted,/And had I twenty times so many foes,/And each of them had twenty times their power,/All these could not procure me any scathe/So long as I am loyal, true, and crimeless" (2.4.60–64). His claims prove false, however, as he is arrested on false charges and then assassinated before his trial. Later in the play, Lord Saye makes a similar claim. When Buckingham warns him to be careful as the rebels are targeting people like him, Saye responds "The trust I have is in mine innocence,/And therefore am I bold and resolute" (4.4.58–59). Like Humphrey, his "innocence" does not save him, and both he and his son-in-law are killed by the rebels.

The nobles disdain for justice is revealed more forcibly when Henry, unaware that Gloucester is dead, asks the court to treat him fairly, and Margaret, knowing he is both innocent and dead, responds, "God forbid any malice should prevail/That faultless may condemn a noble man" (3.2.23–24). As Hattaway points out "In England under Henry, law bears little relation to divinity and stands divorced from equity. The regal and judicial roles of the king's court are hopelessly confused, so that the status of the institution itself is compromised."

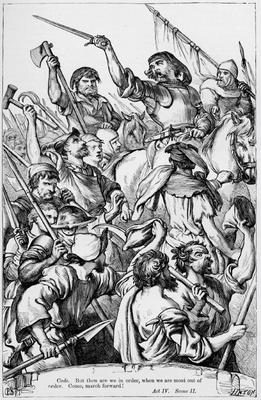
H. C. Selous' illustration of the Cade Rebellion in Act 4, Scene 2; from The Plays of William Shakespeare: The Historical Plays, edited by Charles Cowden Clarke and Mary Cowden Clarke (1830)

The lords' failure to understand the need for an impartial and functioning judiciary is echoed in the rebellion; "The virulent ambition and hostility to law that characterised the barons equally characterise the workmen," suggesting there is no difference between the old order and the new. This is evident in Cade's speech after ordering the execution of Lord Saye; "The proudest peer in the realm shall not wear a head on his shoulders unless he pay me tribute. There shall not a maid be married but she shall pay to me her maidenhead ere they have it. Men shall hold of me in capite. And we charge and command that their wives be as free as heart can wish or tongue can tell" (4.7.112–117). In this proposed new world order, Cade envisions establishing an autocracy where all will pay fealty to him, and where his laws, which he can make arbitrarily, stand for everyone. As such, in this political system, as in the old, law and justice seem to have little relevance.

==== Physical destruction ====
Physical violence permeates the play, with many characters dying violently. Gloucester is suffocated in his bed; Winchester dies in a passionate frenzy; Suffolk is beheaded; Somerset and Clifford are killed in battle; Cade has Matthew Gough, Humphrey Stafford, William Stafford, Lord Saye, James Comer, and the Clerk of Chatham executed during the rebellion, and is then killed and beheaded himself by Alexander Iden.

Gloucester's death in particular is associated with the physical, as seen in Warwick's detailed description of the body;

See how the blood is settled in his face.
Oft have I seen a timely-parted ghost,
Of ashy semblance, meagre, pale, and bloodless,
Being all descended to the labouring heart,
Who in the conflict that it holds with death
Attracts the same for aidance 'gainst the enemy,
Which with the heart there cools, and ne'er returneth
To blush and beautify the cheek again.
But see, his face is black and full of blood;
His eyeballs further out than when he lived,
Staring full ghastly like a strangled man;
His hair upreared, his nostrils stretched with struggling,
His hands abroad displayed, as one that grasped
And tugged for life and was by strength subdued.
Look on the sheets: his hair, you see, is sticking;
His well-proportioned beard made rough and rugged,
Like to the summer's corn by tempest lodged.
It cannot be but he was murdered here.
The least of all these signs were probable.
(3.2.160–178)

Winchester's death is also physically grotesque as he distorts his face and curses God, haunted by the ghost of Gloucester.

However, many of the after-death actions are even more macabre than the deaths themselves. Suffolk's head is delivered to Margaret, who carries it around court for the last two acts of the play. Lord Stafford and his brother are killed and their bodies dragged through the streets behind horses. Lord Saye and his son-in-law are beheaded and their heads carried throughout the streets on poles and made to kiss. Cade is beheaded and his head delivered to the king. Not only is physical violence presented as a major theme, but so too is physical desecration, a disregard for the body after death.

== Performance ==
Poster from Michael Boyd's 2000 production

After the original 1592 performances, the complete text of 2 Henry VI seems to have been rarely acted. The first recorded performance after Shakespeare's day was on 23 April 1864 (Shakespeare's tercentenary) at the Surrey Theatre in London, as a stand-alone performance, with director James Anderson playing York and Cade. Of this production, The Illustrated London News wrote, "It is a revival, or rather restoration to the stage, of an utterly neglected work, which has not been played for 270 years." The next definite performance was in 1889, when George Osmond Tearle directed another stand-alone production at the Shakespeare Memorial Theatre in Stratford-upon-Avon, starring Erskine Lewis as Henry and Ellen Cranston as Margaret. In 1899, F.R. Benson directed another stand-alone production of the play at the Shakespeare Memorial Theatre. In 1906, he revived the play, and included 1 Henry VI and 3 Henry VI in a production of Shakespeare's two tetralogies, performed over eight nights. As far as can be ascertained, this was not only the first performance of the octology, but was also the first definite performance of both the tetralogy and the trilogy. Benson himself played Henry and his wife, Constance Benson, played Margaret.

In 1951, Douglas Seale directed a production at the Birmingham Repertory Theatre, starring Paul Daneman as Henry, Rosalind Boxall as Margaret, John Arnatt as York and Alfred Burke as Gloucester. 2 Henry VI has not been performed as a stand-alone play since then, although Seale's production was so successful that 3 Henry VI followed in 1952, and 1 Henry VI in 1953, all with linked casting.

A production that made much of its unedited status came in 1977, at the Royal Shakespeare Theatre, where Terry Hands presented all three Henry VI plays with Alan Howard as Henry and Helen Mirren as Margaret. Although the production was only moderately successful at the box office, it was critically lauded at the time for Alan Howard's unique portrayal of Henry. Howard adopted historical details concerning the real Henry's madness into his performance, presenting the character as constantly on the brink of a mental and emotional breakdown. Also praised was the staging of the battle of St Albans, which was fought between the principal characters only, without any extras or suggestions of it being a larger battle, thus emphasising that the whole conflict grew from what was originally a small family squabble. Possibly as a reaction to a recent adaptation of the trilogy under the general title Wars of the Roses, which was strongly political, Hands attempted to ensure his own production was entirely apolitical; "Wars of the Roses was a study in power politics: its central image was the conference table, and Warwick, the scheming king-maker, was the central figure. But that's not Shakespeare. Shakespeare goes far beyond politics. Politics is a very shallow science." Aside from Howard and Mirren, the production starred Emrys James as York and Graham Crowden as Gloucester.

Chuk Iwuji as Henry VI

Under the direction of Michael Boyd the play was presented at the Swan Theatre in Stratford in 2000, with David Oyelowo as Henry, Fiona Bell as Margaret, Clive Wood as York, and Richard Cordery as Gloucester. The play was presented with the five other history plays (Richard II, 1 Henry IV, 2 Henry IV, Henry V and Richard III) to form a complete eight-part history cycle under the general title This England: The Histories (the first time the RSC had ever attempted to stage the eight plays as one sequence). This England: The Histories was revived in 2006, as part of the Complete Works festival at the Courtyard Theatre, with the Henry VI plays again directed by Boyd, and starring Chuk Iwuji as Henry, Katy Stephens as Margaret, Jonathan Slinger as York and, reprising his role from 2000, Richard Cordery as Gloucester. When the Complete Works wrapped in March 2007, the history plays remained on stage, under the shorter title The Histories, as part of a two-year thirty-four actor ensemble production. 2 Henry VI was performed under the title Henry VI, Part 2: England's Fall. At the end of the two-year programme, the entire octology was performed over a four-day period under the title The Glorious Moment; Richard II was staged on a Thursday evening, followed by the two Henry IV plays on Friday afternoon and evening, the three Henry VI plays on Saturday (two afternoon performances and one evening performance), and Richard III on Sunday evening.

Boyd's production garnered much attention at the time because of his interpolations and additions to the text. Most notably, Boyd introduced a new character into the trilogy. Called The Keeper, the character never speaks, but upon the death of each major character, the Keeper (played by Edward Clayton in 2000, and by Anthony Bunsee in 2006/2007), wearing all red, would walk onto stage and approach the body. The actor playing the body would then stand up and allow himself to be led off-stage by the figure. Another alteration was that the 'Lieutenant' who orders Suffolk's death in 4.1 was in fact the ghost of Lord Talbot (played by Keith Bartlett), who had been killed in 1 Henry VI. Additionally, during Jack Cade's rebellion, the ghosts of Gloucester, Winchester and Suffolk all appear as rebels, and in a much lauded piece of double casting, Clayton and Bunsee also played Dick the Butcher in their respective performances. The production was also particularly noted for its realistic violence. According to Robert Gore-Langton of the Daily Express, in his review of the original 2000 production, "blood from a severed arm sprayed over my lap. A human liver slopped to the floor by my feet. An eyeball scudded past, then a tongue."

In 2012, the trilogy was staged at Shakespeare's Globe as part of the Globe to Globe Festival, with each play performed by a different Balkans based company and offered as a commentary on the recent history of violence in that region. 2 Henry VI was staged by the National Theater of Albania, directed by Adonis Filipi, and starring Indrit Çobani as Henry, Ermina Hysaj as Margaret, Vasjan Lami as York and Kristaq Skrami as Gloucester. In 2013, Nick Bagnall directed another production of the trilogy at the Globe. All three plays were performed each day, beginning at midday, under the overall title Henry VI: Three Plays. 2 Henry VI was performed under the title Henry VI: The Houses of York and Lancaster. Each of the plays was edited down to two hours, and the entire trilogy was performed with a cast of fourteen actors. On several specific dates, the plays were performed at the actual locations where some of the original events took place and streamed live to the theatre; "battlefield productions" were staged at Towton (Battle of Towton from 3 Henry VI), Tewkesbury (Battle of Tewkesbury from 3 Henry VI), St Albans Cathedral (First Battle of St Albans from 2 Henry VI and Second Battle of St Albans from 3 Henry VI), and Monken Hadley Common (Battle of Barnet from 3 Henry VI). The production starred Graham Butler as Henry, Mary Doherty as Margaret, Brendan O'Hea as York and Garry Cooper as Gloucester.

The first major American performance was in 1935 at the Pasadena Playhouse in California, directed by Gilmore Brown, as part of a production of all ten Shakespearean histories (the two tetralogies, preceded by King John and succeeded by Henry VIII).

In Europe, unedited stagings of the play took place at the Weimar Court Theatre in 1857. Directed by Franz von Dingelstedt, it was performed as the sixth part of the octology, with all eight plays staged over a ten-day period. A major production was staged at the Burgtheater in Vienna in 1873, with a celebrated performance from Friedrich Mitterwurzer as Winchester. Jocza Savits directed a production of the tetralogy at the Munich Court Theatre in 1889 and again in 1906. In 1927, Saladin Schmitt presented the unedited octology at the Municipal Theatre in Bochum. Denis Llorca staged the tetralogy as one twelve-hour piece in Carcassonne in 1978 and in Créteil in 1979. In 1999, director Ruediger Burbach presented 2 Henry VI and 3 Henry VI at the Zurich Playhouse. This production was unique insofar as a woman (Katharina Schmoelzer) played Henry. Margaret was played by Katharina von Bock.

== Adaptations ==
=== Theatrical ===
Evidence for the first adaptation of 2 Henry VI is found during the Restoration, when, in 1681, John Crowne created a two-part play entitled Henry the Sixth, The First Part and The Misery of Civil War. Henry comprised Acts 1–3 of 2 Henry VI focusing on the death of Gloucester, Misery adapted the last two acts of 2 Henry VI and much of 3 Henry VI. Writing at the time of Popish Plot, Crowne, who was a devout royalist, used his adaptation to warn about the danger of allowing England to descend into another civil war, which would be the case should the Whig party rise to power. As such, the scenes of Jack Cade's rebellion, as depicted in Misery, were much more violent than in Shakespeare, with painted backdrops of people on fire and children impaled on pikes. Crowne also rewrote the roles of Gloucester and Winchester to make Gloucester more saint-like and taintless, and Winchester even more villainous. He also linked the murder of Gloucester to the recent assassination of Edmund Berry Godfrey, an incident which had led to an outbreak of anti-Catholic hysteria in London in 1678. By creating this link, Crowne was aiming to enhance anti-Catholic sentiment even more and ensure the passing of the Exclusion Bill, which would prevent the Catholic James Stuart, Duke of York succeeding his brother, the Protestant Charles II. To this end, Crowne rewrote the murder scene to give more characterisation to the three murderers, who were depicted as devout, but cold-blooded Catholics.

Two more adaptations followed in 1723. The first was Humfrey Duke of Gloucester by Ambrose Philips, which used about thirty lines from Acts 1–3 of 2 Henry VI and was performed at Drury Lane. In a possible comment on the politics of Crowne's adaptation, Phillips dedicated his version to William Pulteney, 1st Earl of Bath, a leading Whig politician. The second 1723 adaptation, also performed at Drury Lane, was Theophilus Cibber's King Henry VI: A Tragedy, which used Act 5 of 2 Henry VI and Acts 1 and 2 of 3 Henry VI, and which featured his father Colley Cibber as Winchester.

In 1817, Edmund Kean appeared in J.H. Merivale's Richard Duke of York; or the Contention of York and Lancaster, which used material from all three Henry VI plays, but removed everything not directly related to York. Material from 2 Henry VI included the lamentation about the loss of Anjou and Maine, the conflict between Gloucester and Winchester, the murder of Gloucester, the death of Winchester (where all Warwick's dialogue is reassigned to York), and Cade's rebellion.

Following Merivale's example, Robert Atkins adapted all three plays into a single piece for a performance at The Old Vic in 1923 as part of the celebrations for the tercentenary of the First Folio. Guy Martineau played Henry and Esther Whitehouse played Margaret. Atkins himself played York.

The success of the 1951–1953 Douglas Seale stand-alone productions of each of the individual plays in Birmingham prompted him to present the three plays together at the Old Vic in 1957 under the general title The Wars of the Roses. Barry Jackson adapted the text, altering the trilogy into a two-part play; 1 Henry VI and 2 Henry VI were combined (with almost all of 1 Henry VI eliminated) and 3 Henry VI was edited down. Seale again directed, with Paul Daneman again appearing as Henry and Alfred Burke as Gloucester, alongside Barbara Jefford as Margaret and Derek Godfrey as York.

The production which is usually credited with establishing the reputation of the play in the modern theatre is John Barton and Peter Hall's 1963/1964 RSC production of the tetralogy, adapted into a three-part series, under the general title The Wars of the Roses, at the Royal Shakespeare Theatre. The first play (entitled simply Henry VI) featured a much shortened version of 1 Henry VI and half of 2 Henry VI (up to the death of Beaufort). The second play (entitled Edward IV) featured the second half of 2 Henry VI and a shortened version of 3 Henry VI, which was then followed by a shortened version of Richard III as the third play. In all, 1,450 lines written by Barton were added to 6,000 lines of original Shakespearean material, with a total of 12,350 lines removed. The production starred David Warner as Henry, Peggy Ashcroft as Margaret, Donald Sinden as York and Paul Hardwick as Gloucester. Barton and Hall were both especially concerned that the plays reflect the contemporary political environment, with the civil chaos and breakdown of society depicted in the plays mirrored in the contemporary milieu, by events such as the building of the Berlin Wall in 1961, the Cuban Missile Crisis in 1962 and the assassination of John F. Kennedy in 1963. The directors allowed these events to reflect themselves in the production, arguing that "we live among war, race riots, revolutions, assassinations, and the imminent threat of extinction. The theatre is, therefore, examining fundamentals in staging the Henry VI plays." They were also influenced by politically focused literary theory of the time; both had attended the 1956 London visit of Bertolt Brecht's Berliner Ensemble, both were subscribers to Antonin Artaud's theory of "Theatre of Cruelty", and Hall had read an English translation of Jan Kott's influential Shakespeare Our Contemporary in 1964 prior to its publication in Britain. Both Barton and Hall were also supporters of E.M.W. Tillyard's 1944 book Shakespeare's History Plays, which was still a hugely influential text in Shakespearian scholarship, especially in terms of its argument that Shakespeare in the tetraology was advancing the Tudor myth.

Another major adaptation was staged in 1987 by the English Shakespeare Company, under the direction of Michael Bogdanov. This touring production opened at the Old Vic, and subsequently toured for two years, performing at, amongst other places, the Panasonic Globe Theatre in Tokyo, Japan (as the inaugural play of the arena), the Festival dei Due Mondi in Spoleto, Italy and at the Adelaide Festival in Adelaide, Australia. Following the structure established by Barton and Hall, Bogdanov combined a heavily edited 1 Henry VI and the first half of 2 Henry VI into one play (Henry VI), and the second half of 2 Henry VI and 3 Henry VI into another (Edward IV), and followed them with an edited Richard III. Also like Barton and Hall, Bogdanov concentrated on political issues, although he made them far more overt than had his predecessors. For example, played by June Watson, Margaret was closely modelled after the British Prime Minister at the time, Margaret Thatcher, even to the point of having similar clothes and hair. Likewise, Paul Brennan's Henry was closely modelled after King Edward VIII, before his abdication. Jack Cade, played by Michael Pennington was presented as a punk with spiked hair and wearing a shirt depicting a Union Jack with a white rose in the middle, and during the Cade rebellion, football hooligan chants were heard. Indeed, the Cade rebellion in general was modelled on the National Front. Bogdanov also employed frequent anachronisms and contemporary visual registers, in an effort to show the relevance of the politics to the contemporary period. The production was noted for its pessimism as regards contemporary British politics, with some critics feeling the political resonances were too heavy handed. However, the series was a huge box office success. Alongside Watson and Brennen, the play starred Barry Stanton as York and Colin Farrell as Gloucester.

Another adaptation of the tetralogy by the Royal Shakespeare Company followed in 1988, performed at the Barbican. Adapted by Charles Wood and directed by Adrian Noble, the Barton/Hall structure was again followed, reducing the trilogy to two plays by dividing 2 Henry VI in the middle. The resulting trilogy was entitled The Plantagenets, with the individual plays entitled Henry VI, The Rise of Edward IV and Richard III, His Death. Starring Ralph Fiennes as Henry, Penny Downie as Margaret, Anton Lesser as York and David Waller as Gloucester, the production was extremely successful with both audiences and critics.

Michael Bogdanov and the English Shakespeare Company presented a different adaptation at the Swansea Grand Theatre in 1991, using the same cast as on the touring production. All eight plays from the history cycle were presented over a seven night period, with each play receiving one performance only, and with only twenty eight actors portraying the nearly five hundred roles. Whilst the other five plays in the cycle were unadapted, the Henry VI plays were combined into two, using the Barton/Hall structure, with the first named The House of Lancaster and the second, The House of York.

In 2000, Edward Hall presented the trilogy as a two-part series at the Watermill Theatre in Newbury. Hall followed the Jackson/Seale structure, combining 1 Henry VI and 2 Henry VI into one play which all but eliminated 1 Henry VI and following this with an edited version of 3 Henry VI. This production was noted for how it handled the violence of the play. The set was designed to look like an abattoir, but rather than attempt to present the violence realistically (as most productions do), Hall went in the other direction; presenting the violence symbolically. Whenever a character was decapitated or killed, a red cabbage was sliced up whilst the actor mimed the death beside it.

In 2001, Tom Markus directed an adaptation of the tetralogy at the Colorado Shakespeare Festival. Condensing all fours plays into one, Markus named the play Queen Margaret, doing much the same with the character of Margaret as Merivale had done with York. Margaret was played by Gloria Biegler, Henry by Richard Haratine, York by Lars Tatom and Gloucester by Charles Wilcox.

Poster from the 2001 Shakespeare's Rugby Wars

Another unusual 2001 adaptation of the tetralogy was entitled Shakespeare's Rugby Wars. Written by Matt Toner and Chris Coculuzzi, and directed by Coculuzzi, the play was acted by the Upstart Crow Theatre Group and staged outdoors at the Robert Street Playing Field as part of the Toronto Fringe Festival. Presented as if it were a live rugby match between York and Lancaster, the 'play' featured commentary from Falstaff (Stephen Flett), which was broadcast live for the audience. The 'match' itself was refereed by 'Bill Shakespeare' (played by Coculuzzi), and the actors (whose characters names all appeared on their jerseys) had microphones attached and would recite dialogue from all four plays at key moments.

In 2002, Leon Rubin presented the tetralogy as a trilogy at the Stratford Shakespeare Festival in Ontario. Using the Barton/Hall method of combining 1 Henry VI with the first half of 2 Henry VI, and the second half of 2 Henry VI with 3 Henry VI, the plays were renamed Henry VI: Revenge in France and Henry VI: Revolt in England. Michael Thierry played Henry, Seana McKenna played Margaret, Thom Marriott played York and David Francis played Gloucester.

Also in 2002, Edward Hall and the Propeller Company presented a one-play all-male cast modern dress adaptation of the trilogy at the Watermill Theatre. Under the title Rose Rage, Hall used a cast of only thirteen actors to portray the nearly 150 speaking roles in the four-hour production, thus necessitating doubling and tripling of parts. Although a new adaptation, this production followed the Jackson/Seale method of eliminating almost all of 1 Henry VI. The original cast included Jonathan McGuinness as Henry, Robert Hands as Margaret, Guy Williams as York and Richard Clothier as Gloucester. After a successful run at the Watermill, the play moved to the Chicago Shakespeare Theater. The American cast included Carman Lacivita as Henry, Scott Parkinson as Margaret, Bruce A. Young as York and Sean Fortunato as Gloucester.

Outside England, a major European adaptation of the tetralogy took place in 1864 in Weimar under the direction of Franz von Dingelstedt, who, seven years previously had staged the play unedited. Dingelstedt turned the trilogy into a two-parter under the general name Die weisse rose. The first play was called Haus Lancaster, the second Haus York. This adaptation was unique insofar as both plays were created by combining material from all three Henry VI plays. Following this structure, Alfred von Walzogen also produced a two-part play in 1875, under the general title Edward IV. Another European adaptation was in 1965 at the Piccolo Teatro in Milan. Directed by Giorgio Strehler it went under the title Il gioco del potenti (The Play of the Mighty). Using Barton and Hall's structure, Strehler also added several characters, including a Chorus, who used monologues from Richard II, both parts of Henry IV, Henry V, Macbeth and Timon of Athens, and two gravediggers called Bevis and Holland (after the names of two of Cade's rebels in the Folio text), who commented (with dialogue written by Strehler himself) on each of the major characters as they set about burying them. A major German adaptation was Peter Palitzsch's two-part adaptation of the trilogy as Rosenkriege in 1967 at the Stuttgart State Theatre. Condensing the three plays into two, Heinrich VI and Eduard IV, Palitzsch's adaptation concluded with the opening monologue from Richard III.

=== Television ===
The first television adaptation of the play was in 1960 when the BBC produced a serial entitled An Age of Kings. The show comprised fifteen sixty- and seventy-five-minute episodes which adapted all eight of Shakespeare's sequential history plays. Directed by Michael Hayes and produced by Peter Dews, with a script by Eric Crozier, the production featured Terry Scully as Henry, Mary Morris as Margaret, Jack May as York and John Ringham as Gloucester. The tenth episode, "The Fall of a Protector" covers Acts 1, 2 and Act 3, Scene 1, ending with York's soliloquy regarding the fact that he now has troops at his disposal and his revelation of his plans to use Jack Cade to instigate a popular rebellion. The eleventh episode, "The Rabble from Kent", presents everything from Act 3, Scene 2 onwards, beginning with the death of Humphrey. With each episode running one hour, a great deal of text was necessarily removed, but aside from truncation, only minor alterations were made to the original. For example, in "The Fall of a Protector", Peter Thump does not kill Thomas Horner during the combat; he compels him to confess by sitting on him, and Horner is promptly arrested. In "The Rabble from Kent", we see the murder of Gloucester, whereas in the text, it happens off-stage. Also worth noting is that the characters of both George Plantagenet and Edmund, Earl of Rutland are introduced just prior to the Battle of St Albans, whereas in the text, neither character is introduced until 3 Henry VI (Edmund in Act 1, Scene 3; George in Act 2, Scene 2). Additionally, Edmund is played by an adult actor, whereas in the text, he is a child.

In 1965, BBC 1 broadcast all three plays from John Barton and Peter Hall's The Wars of the Roses trilogy (Henry VI, The Rise of Edward IV and Richard III) with David Warner as Henry and Peggy Ashcroft as Margaret. Directed for television by Robin Midgley and Michael Hayes, the plays were presented as more than simply filmed theatre, with the core idea being "to recreate theatre production in televisual terms—not merely to observe it, but to get to the heart of it." Filming was done on the RSC stage, but not during actual performances, thus allowing cameras to get close to the actors, and cameramen with hand-held cameras to shoot battle scenes. Additionally, camera platforms were created around the theatre. In all, twelve cameras were used, allowing the final product to be edited more like a film than a piece of static filmed theatre. Filming was done following the 1964 run of the plays at Stratford-upon-Avon, and took place over an eight-week period, with 52 BBC staff working alongside 84 RSC staff to bring the project to fruition. In 1966, the production was repeated on BBC 1 where it was re-edited into eleven episodes of 50 minutes each. The second episode, "Margaret of Anjou", presented 1 Henry VI from Act 4, Scene 2 onwards, beginning with Talbot confronting the French general at Harfleur (Bordeaux in the play), as well as the first half of Act 1, Scene 1 of 2 Henry VI (concluding with Henry and Margaret departing from the court). The third episode, "The Lord Protector" covered Acts 1, 2 and Act 3, Scene 1 of 2 Henry VI, ending with York's soliloquy regarding the fact that he now has troops at his disposal and his revelation of his plans to use Jack Cade to instigate a popular rebellion. The fourth episode, "The Council Board", presented Act 3, Scene 2 up to Act 4, Scene 8, concluding with Jack Cade's forces abandoning him. The fifth episode, "The Fearful King", presented the rest of 2 Henry VI (beginning with Henry pardoning Cade's rebels) as well as 3 Henry VI Act 1 and Act 2, Scene 1, concluding with Warwick rallying Edward, Richard and George after their father's death.

Another television version of the play was produced by the BBC in 1981 for their BBC Television Shakespeare series, although the episode did not air until 1983. Directed by Jane Howell, the play was presented as the second part of the tetralogy (all four adaptations directed by Howell) with linked casting; Henry was played by Peter Benson, Margaret by Julia Foster, York by Bernard Hill and Gloucester by David Burke. Howell's presentation of the complete first historical tetralogy was one of the most lauded achievements of the entire BBC series, and prompted Stanley Wells to argue that the productions were "probably purer than any version given in the theatre since Shakespeare's time." Michael Mannheim was similarly impressed, calling the tetralogy "a fascinating, fast-paced and surprisingly tight-knit study in political and national deterioration."

Henry (Peter Benson) surveys the destruction in the wake of the Jack Cade rebellion. Note the charred and rubbish strewn set, which has darkened considerably since 1 Henry VI, where yellow, bright blue and red predominated

Inspired by the notion that the political intrigues behind the Wars of the Roses often seemed like playground squabbles, Howell and production designer Oliver Bayldon staged the four plays in a single set resembling a children's adventure playground. However, little attempt was made at realism. For example, Bayldon did not disguise the parquet flooring ("it stops the set from literally representing [...] it reminds us we are in a modern television studio"), and in all four productions, the title of the play is displayed within the set itself (on banners in 1 Henry VI and 2 Henry VI (where it is visible throughout the entire first scene), on a shroud in 3 Henry VI, and written on a chalkboard by Richard himself in Richard III). Many critics felt these set design choices lent the production an air of Brechtian verfremdungseffekt. Stanley Wells wrote of the set that it was intended to invite the viewer to "accept the play's artificiality of language and action," Michael Hattaway describes it as "anti-illusionist," Susan Willis argues that the set allows the productions "to reach theatrically toward the modern world" and Ronald Knowles writes "a major aspect of the set was the subliminal suggestion of childlike anarchy, role-playing, rivalry, game and vandalism, as if all culture were precariously balanced on the shaky foundations of atavistic aggression and power-mad possession." As the four plays progressed, the set decayed and became more and more dilapidated as social order became more fractious. In the same vein, the costumes became more and more monotone as the plays went on—The First Part of Henry the Sixt features brightly coloured costumes which clearly distinguish the various combatants from one another, but by The Tragedy of Richard III, everyone fights in similarly coloured dark costumes, with little to differentiate one army from another.

Another element of verfremdungseffekt in this production is the use of doubling, particularly the use of the actors David Burke and Trevor Peacock. Burke plays Henry's closest advisor and most loyal servant, Gloucester, and after Gloucester's death, he plays Jack Cade's right-hand man, Dick the Butcher. Peacock plays Cade himself, having previously appeared in The First Part of Henry the Sixt as Lord Talbot, representative of chivalry. Both actors play complete inversions of their previous characters, re-creating both an authentically Elizabethan theatrical practice and a Breachtian political commentary. Graham Holderness saw Howell's non-naturalistic production as something of a reaction to the BBC's adaptation of the Henriad in seasons one and two, which had been directed by David Giles in the traditional and straightforward manner favoured by then series producer Cedric Messina; "where Messina saw the history plays conventionally as orthodox Tudor historiography, and [David Giles] employed dramatic techniques which allow that ideology a free and unhampered passage to the spectator, Jane Howell takes a more complex view of the first tetralogy as, simultaneously, a serious attempt at historical interpretation, and as a drama with a peculiarly modern relevance and contemporary application. The plays, to this director, are not a dramatisation of the Elizabethan World Picture but a sustained interrogation of residual and emergent ideologies in a changing society [...] This awareness of the multiplicity of potential meanings in the play required a decisive and scrupulous avoidance of television or theatrical naturalism: methods of production should operate to open the plays out, rather than close them into the immediately recognisable familiarity of conventional Shakespearean production."

Howell's The Second Part of Henry the Sixt was based on the folio text rather than the quarto; however, it departed from that text in a number of places. For example, numerous lines were cut from almost every scene. Some of the more notable omissions include: in Act 1, Scene 1, both of Gloucester's references to Bedford are absent (ll. 82–83, 95–96), as is the reference to Suffolk's demands that he be paid for escorting Margaret from France (ll. 131–133), and York's allusion to Althaea and Calydon in his closing soliloquy (ll.231–235). Absent in Act 2, Scene 1 is Gloucester's question to Winchester "Is your priesthood grown peremptory? Tantaene animis caelestibus irae?" (ll.23–24), as are lines 173–180, where Winchester taunts Gloucester about Eleanor's arrest and Gloucester calls off their duel. York's outline of Edward III's seven sons is absent from Act 2, Scene 2 (ll.10–17), as is Salisbury's reference to Owen Glendower (l.41). Suffolk's accusation that Gloucester was involved in necromancy with Eleanor is omitted from Act 3, Scene 1 (ll.47–53), as is Gloucester's outline of how he dealt with criminals during his time as Protector (ll.128–132). Also absent from 3.1 are the comments by Winchester, Suffolk and Margaret after Gloucester accuses them of conspiring to bring him down (ll.172–185), and York's references to how he fought alongside Cade in Ireland (ll.360–370). In Act 4, Scene 1, all references to Walter Whitmore's name as Gualtier are absent (ll.38–39). The entirety of Act 4, Scene 5 (a brief scene showing Scales and Gough on patrol at the Tower of London) is absent. In Act 5, Scene 1, some of the dialogue between Clifford and Warwick is absent (ll.200–210).

However, there were also some additions to the text, most noticeably some lines from The Contention, such as in Act 1, Scene 1, where two lines are added to Salisbury's vow to support York if he can prove he is a legitimate heir to the crown. Between lines 197 and 198 is added "The reverence of mine age and the Neville's name/Is of no little force if I command." In Act 1, Scene 3, two lines are added to the conversation between Margaret and Thump between lines 31 and 32, where Thump mistakes the word 'usurper' for 'usurer" and is corrected by Margaret. Another example is found in Act 2, Scene 1, where the extended conversation between Gloucester and Winchester in which Gloucester says Winchester was born "in bastardy" is included. Other changes include the transferral of lines to characters other than those who speak them in the Folio text. The most notable of these is 1.3.211 where Gloucester's line "This is the law, and this Duke Gloucester's doom" is given to Henry. Additionally, in Act 1, Scene 4, during the conjuration, there is no separate spirit in the scene; all the spirit's dialogue is spoken 'through' Jourdayne, and her lines from the Folio are omitted. Also, later in the scene, it is Buckingham who reads the prophecies, not York. In Act 4, Scene 1, the second half of line 139 ("Pompey the Great, and Suffolk dies by pirates") is spoken by the Lieutenant, not Suffolk.

Another notable stylistic technique is that the soliloquies of York in Act 1, Scene 1 and Act 3, Scene 1, as well as those of Eleanor and Hum in Act 1, Scene 2, and York's asides in Act 1, Scene 1 and Act 3, Scene 1 are all delivered direct to camera, as is the Dick the Butcher's comments in Act 4, Scene 2, as Cade delivers his speech to the masses. Also worth noting is that the character of George Plantagenet is introduced just prior to the Battle of St Albans, whereas in the text, he is not introduced until 3 Henry VI, Act 2, Scene 2. Additionally, Buckingham is killed onscreen whereas in the play, his fate is unknown, only revealed in the opening lines of 3 Henry VI to have been killed by Edward.

In 1964, Austrian channel ORF 2 presented an adaptation of the trilogy by Leopold Lindtberg under the title Heinrich VI. The cast list from this production has been lost. In 1969, German channel ZDF presented a filmed version of the first part of Peter Palitzsch's 1967 two-part adaptation of the trilogy in Stuttgart, Heinrich VI: Der Krieg der Rosen 1. The second part, Eduard IV: Der Krieg der Rosen 2, was screened in 1971.

=== Radio ===
In 1923, extracts from all three Henry VI plays were broadcast on BBC Radio, performed by the Cardiff Station Repertory Company as the third episode of a series of programs showcasing Shakespeare's plays, entitled Shakespeare Night. In 1947, BBC Third Programme aired a one-hundred-and-fifty-minute adaptation of the trilogy as part of their Shakespeare's Historical Plays series, a six-part adaptation of the eight sequential history plays, with linked casting. Adapted by Maurice Roy Ridley, King Henry VI starred John Bryon as Henry, Gladys Young as Margaret, Richard Williams as York and Baliol Holloway as Gloucester. In 1952, Third Programme aired an adaptation of the tetralogy by Peter Watts and John Dover Wilson under the general name The Wars of the Roses. The tetralogy was adapted into a trilogy but in an unusual way. 1 Henry VI was simply removed, so the trilogy contained only 2 Henry VI, 3 Henry VI and Richard III. The reason for this was explained by Dover Wilson, who argued that 1 Henry VI is "patchwork in which Shakespeare collaborated with inferior dramatists." The adaptation starred Valentine Dyall as Henry, Sonia Dresdel as Margaret, Stephen Jack as York and Gordon McLeod as Gloucester. In 1971, BBC Radio 3 presented a two-part adaptation of the trilogy by Raymond Raikes. Part 1 contained an abridged 1 Henry VI and an abridged version of the first three acts of 2 Henry VI. Part 2 presented Acts 4 and 5 and an abridged 3 Henry VI. Nigel Lambert played Henry, Barbara Jefford played Margaret and Ian McKellen played both York and Richard III. In 1977, BBC Radio 4 presented a 26-part serialisation of the eight sequential history plays under the general title Vivat Rex (Long live the King). Adapted by Martin Jenkins as part of the celebration of the Silver Jubilee of Elizabeth II, 2 Henry VI comprised episodes 17 ("Witchcraft") and 18 ("Jack Cade"). James Laurenson played Henry, Peggy Ashcroft played Margaret, Peter Jeffrey played York and Richard Burton narrated.

In America, in 1936, a heavily edited adaptation of the trilogy was broadcast as part of NBC Blue's Radio Guild series. Comprising three 60-minute episodes aired a week apart, the adaptation was written by Vernon Radcliffe and starred Henry Herbert as Henry, and Janet Nolan as Margaret. In 1954, CBC Radio presented an adaptation of the trilogy by Andrew Allen, who combined 1 Henry VI, 2 Henry VI and 3 Henry VI into a 160-minute episode. There is no known cast information for this production.

In 1985, German radio channel Sender Freies Berlin broadcast a heavily edited 76-minute two-part adaptation of the octology adapted by Rolf Schneider, under the title Shakespeare's Rosenkriege.

=== Manga ===
Aya Kanno's Japanese manga comic Requiem of the Rose King is a loose adaptation of the first Shakespearean historical tetralogy, covering Henry VI and Richard III.

== See also ==
- List of idioms attributed to Shakespeare
