= Stratford Shakespeare festival =

The Stratford Shakespeare Festival is an annual festival that takes place in Stratford, Ontario, Canada.

Stratford Shakespeare Festival or Stratford Shakespeare festival may refer to:

- American Shakespeare Theatre, Stratford, Connecticut, United States
- Complete Works (RSC festival), Stratford-upon-Avon, Warwickshire, England
- Shakespeare on the River Festival, Stratford, Victoria, Australia
- Stratford Shakespeare Festival (New Zealand), Stratford, New Zealand
