= Jonathan Slinger =

British actor

- Born: Jonathan Slinger
- Occupation: Actor
- Years active: 1995–present

Jonathan Slinger is an English actor.

Slinger trained at the Royal Academy of Dramatic Art (RADA), graduating in 1994. From there, he went to work at the Royal National Theatre and Shakespeare's Globe. He has also worked extensively with the Royal Shakespeare Company, including the Complete Works and This England: The Histories cycles, playing Richard II, Fluellen, Richard Duke of York and Richard III.

He played Bernard Woolley, the Prime Minister's Principal Private Secretary, in the stage version of Yes, Prime Minister (Chichester/London, 2010). In 2011, he appeared again with the Royal Shakespeare Company in the title role of Macbeth, a new production by Michael Boyd which was the first Shakespeare play to appear in the revamped Royal Shakespeare Theatre. In 2012, he played Malvolio and Prospero for the RSC in London and Stratford, and in 2013 he played Hamlet. In May 2015, he started playing Willy Wonka in Charlie and the Chocolate Factory in London at Theatre Royal Drury Lane.

== Partial filmography ==
- The Last September (1999) as Laurence Carstairs
- Forgive and Forget (TV - 2000) as Carl
- A Knight's Tale (2001) as Peter the Pardoner
- Ladies and Gentleman (TV - 2007) as Mr. Lupton
- The Adventures of Daniel (2010) as Mr. Wallace
- A Thousand Kisses Deep (2011) as Doug Selva
- Still (2014) as Ed
- Bait (2014) as Jeremy
- The Salisbury Poisonings (2020) as Professor Tim Atkins
- Xenoblade Chronicles 3 (2022) as Consul D (voice)
- The Sandman (2025) as Maximilien Robespierre
- Steal (TV - 2026) as "London"
