= Marcella Evaristi =

Scottish actress,playwright and screenwriter

- Born: 19 July 1953 (age 73); Glasgow, Scotland
- Occupations: Actress, Playwright, Screenwriter
- Writing career
- Genre: drama
- Notable work: Commedia (1982)

Marcella Evaristi (born 19 July 1953) is a Scottish actress, playwright and screenwriter.

== Background ==
Marcella Evaristi was born in Glasgow on 19 July 1953 and grew up in her parents' café next to the old Alhambra Theatre in Glasgow. She was educated at Notre Dame High School, Glasgow and the University of Glasgow, where she achieved a M.A.(honours) in 1974.

Evaristi married theatre director Michael Boyd in 1982 and had twins, Daniel and Gabriella. They are now divorced.

== Work ==
Evaristi has written stage, radio and television plays. Her first play was Dorothy and the Bitch in 1976 which she performed herself on stage. Scotia's Darlings was staged in 1978 and Mouthpieces was produced at the Byre Theatre, St. Andrews, in 1980.

The revue Sugar and Spite, written with Liz Lochhead, was staged at the Traverse Theatre in Edinburgh in 1978. The Traverse premiered Evaristi's Hard to Get in 1980, and Wedding Belles and Green Grasses in 1981.

Her Commedia, set in contemporary Glasgow and Bologna, was first staged at the Crucible Theatre in Sheffield in 1982 and then produced by the Scottish Theatre Company in 1984.

=== Stage plays ===
- Dorothy and the Bitch (monologue), 1976
- Scotia's Darlings, 1978
- Sugar and Spite (revue) with Liz Lochhead, 1978
- Mouthpieces: A Musical Satirical Revue (with Liz Lochhead), 1980
- Commedia, 1983
- Thank you for Not, in Breach of the Peace (review), 1982
- Checking Out, 1984
- The Works, 1989
- Terrestrial Extras, 1985
- Trio for Strings in Three, 1987
- Visiting Company (monologue,) 1988
- The Offski Variations (monologue), 1990
- Nightflights, 2002
- The Friends of Miss Dorian Gray, 2014

=== Radio plays ===
- Hard to Get, 1981
- Wedding Belles and Green Grasses, 1983
- The Work (adaptation of the
- stage play), 1985
- The Hat, 1988
- The Theory and Practice of Rings, 1992
- Troilus and Cressida and La-di-da-di-da, 1992
- The Gobetweenies, BBC Radio 4 Three series 2011-2013
- Going Dark, BBC Radio 4, 2021

== Awards ==
- Student Verse Competition Prize, BBC, 1974
- Arts Council Bursary, 1975–76
- Pye Award for Best Writer New to Television, 1982, for Eve Set the Balls of Corruption Rolling
