= Still (2014 film) =

2014 film

- DVD cover
- Directed by: Simon Blake
- Screenplay by: Simon Blake
- Based on: Lazarus Man by Simon Blake
- Produced by: Colette Delaney-Smith; Zorana Piggott
- Starring: Aidan Gillen; Jonathan Slinger; Élodie Yung; Amanda Mealing; Sonny Green
- Production companies: Blunt Pictures; 011 Productions
- Distributed by: Verve Pictures
- Release dates: 12 July 2014 (Galway Film Fleadh); 8 May 2015 (UK)
- Running time: 97 minutes
- Country: United Kingdom
- Language: English

Still is a 2014 British drama film written and directed by Simon Blake, adapted from his play Lazarus Man. It stars Aidan Gillen as a grieving father who comes into confrontation with a youth gang in London. It premiered at the Galway Film Fleadh in July 2014, winning Best International 1st Feature Film and was released in the UK in May 2015. Simon Blake won the Best Director at the London Independent Film Festival in 2015. Still was nominated for the Roger Ebert Award at the Chicago International Film Festival in 2014.

== Plot ==
After Tom Carver, a photographer, loses his son to a hit-and-run car collision, he and his wife Rachel divorce, and he descends into self-destructive abuse of alcohol and drugs, unable to let go of his grief. His friend Ed, a tabloid journalist, investigates a murder blamed on local gangs, and, while on a job photographing children at a local school, Carver himself meets a young boy, Jimmy, whose brother was murdered. As Jimmy and Carver bond over their shared loss, Carver learns that Jimmy is interested in photography and tutors him. Carver's girlfriend Christina, a fashion model, moves in with him. While Carver is out buying more alcohol one day, he bumps into a youth. The youth demands an apology, which Carver provides.

Carver and his ex-wife take regular visits to their son's grave. While buying flowers before one such visit, he runs into the youth again, this time with his friends. They harass Carver but flee once he shoves them. Thinking the matter resolved, Carver rejoins his wife. He later finds faeces and a dead animal on his doorstep. When he pursues the youths, he receives a visible wound to his head, which alarms several people, though he brushes off their concerns. Carver's photography is selected to be displayed at a gallery, but during the opening, he becomes obnoxiously drunk. Rachel chastises him and urges him to tell Christina and the police about his troubles with the gang. Carver promises to do so eventually. After further arguing with each other, Rachel calls him "an accident waiting to happen".

After being bullied by the gang, Jimmy tells Carver he no longer wants to associate with him. Carver chases the gang away after he sees them bully Jimmy, and later the gang severely beat Jimmy in retaliation. While walking home to Carver's apartment one night, Christina is raped. She tells Carver that it was done to get to him and demands that he contact the police. Carver and Christina both give statements, and Ed volunteers photographs he has taken while researching local gang violence. The police, however, say they have no concrete evidence of anyone's involvement, as Christina's attackers wore masks.

Upset with the police inaction, Ed urges Carver to take matters into his own hands. Ed helps Carver locate the youth that Carver bumped into, and they kidnap him as he walks down the street alone. Ed leaves Carver alone with him. Although reluctant to tell Carver anything, he eventually reveals himself to be a 15-year-old named Carl. Carver demands to know why the gang targeted him, but Carl says there was no reason. Carl denies any involvement in Christina's rape, though he admits he beat up Jimmy. At the same time, Ed meets Rachel at a party. She is dating a single father and seems happy. When Ed asks her for her secret, she says one must want to be happy. After she asks him to watch over Carver, Ed experiences misgivings in the plan, and he rushes back to Carver's apartment.

Carl insists he is innocent and, to Carver's disbelief, says he knew Carver's son. Carver dismisses Carl's protestations of innocence and injects him with a lethal overdose of heroin. Carl reveals that Carver's son was a member of their gang; on the night that he died, Carver's son was involved in a daredevil game where the kids dodged oncoming cars. Carver initially laughs off the possibility, but, as the drug takes effect, Carl convinces him. Carl protests that Carver saw nothing but good in his son, though he sees nothing but bad in him. After considering this, Carver calls emergency medical services for an ambulance, just as Ed arrives.

== Cast ==
- Aidan Gillen as Tom Carver
- Jonathan Slinger as Ed - Journalist
- Élodie Yung as Christina - Girlfriend
- Amanda Mealing as Rachel - Former wife
- Sonny Green as Carl - Punk kid
- Kate Ashfield - Margaret
- Clive Russell - Detective Penton
- Sarah Niles - Headmaster
- Joseph Duffy as Jimmy - Deceased son

== Production ==
Gillen had received an offer for a big budget 3D Nazi vampire film when he came across the script for Still. Gillen said that he was looking for an excuse not to do the vampire film and became enthused about the idea of starring in a lower-budget, independent drama instead. Principal photography began on 23 November 2012 in London. Shooting lasted for three weeks.

== Release ==
Still premiered at the Galway Film Fleadh on 12 July 2014. Verve Pictures released it in Ireland and the UK on 8 May 2015. Verve Pictures released the Region 2 DVD on 24 August 2015.

== Reception ==
Rotten Tomatoes, a review aggregator, reports that 58% of twelve surveyed critics gave the film a positive review; the average rating was 5.6/10.

Simon Crook of Empire rated it 2/5 stars and wrote, "Why Simon Blake turns to credibility-killing melodrama is baffling enough, but the effect is one of cheek-puffing frustration and emotional disconnect." Trevor Johnston of Time Out London rated it 2/5 stars and wrote, "This is a film which is desperate to make a grand statement about the awful toll of isolation and exhausted compassion but falls short of its ambitions." Benjamin Lee of The Guardian rated it 2/5 stars and called it a "clumsy noir effort". Geoffrey Macnab of The Independent rated it 3/5 stars and wrote that although the film is indecisive about whether it is a character study or a thriller, it "boasts a fine performance from Aidan Gillen". Tara Brady of The Irish Times rated it 3/5 stars and, while calling it a "fascinating debut", said that it never settles onto a single genre. Stephen Martin of The Irish Post wrote, "Blake expertly mixes psycho drama with social realism, quietly commenting on current worries over, and worries for, our young people." Gavin Burke of entertainment.ie wrote that the film's segue into vigilante film is unexpected but causes it to fulfill its potential. Nikki Baughan of The List rated it 2/5 stars and wrote that it "ultimately feels like an interesting idea that's been beaten into submission by a filmmaker looking to make an impact, rather than tell a story".

According to Indie Outlook, "Still was one of the festivals 6 films to look out for, suggesting that Simon Blake, it draws connections between gang culture and indifferent parenting without becoming preachy, allowing provocative themes to emerge organically through the story itself."
