= This England: The Histories =

This England: The Histories was a season of Shakespeare's history plays staged by the Royal Shakespeare Company in 2000–2001. The company staged both of Shakespeare's tetralogies of history plays so that audiences could see all eight plays over several days. The plays staged were: Richard II, Henry IV, Part 1, Henry IV, Part 2, Henry V, Henry VI, Part 1, Henry VI, Part 2, Henry VI, Part 3, and Richard III.

Previously, the RSC had offered seasons in which one of the tetralogies had been staged at the RSC, such as The Wars of the Roses (the Henry VI plays adapted by John Barton), or The Plantagenets (the Henry VI plays directed by Adrian Noble). However, staging all eight plays in sequence was such a mammoth task that it had never been attempted. The RSC solved the problem by maintaining the same actors in the same role, but giving different plays to different directors. The directors often interpreted the plays and characters in very different ways; some productions were in medieval dress, others in modern dress, for example.

== The cast ==
- Samuel West played King Richard II
- David Troughton played Henry Bolingbroke, later King Henry IV
- William Houston played Prince Hal, later King Henry V
- Adam Levy played Hotspur (Henry Percy)
- Desmond Barrit played Falstaff
- David Oyelowo played King Henry VI of England (the first black actor to play an English king for the RSC)
- Fiona Bell played Margaret of Anjou
- Aidan McArdle played Richard Gloucester, later King Richard III

== The stagings ==
- Steven Pimlott directed Richard II in modern dress on a bare white stage in The Other Place
- Michael Attenborough directed the Henry IV plays in medieval dress in a simple set in the Swan Theatre
- Edward Hall directed Henry V in the Royal Shakespeare Theatre in modern dress
- Michael Boyd directed the Henry VI plays and Richard III in the Swan Theatre in a dreamlike medieval setting.

== Revival ==
The Henry VI productions were revived from 7 July 2006 (and from January 2007, Richard III) in the RSC's new Courtyard Theatre, as part of the Complete Works festival and also as the first part of an unprecedented 2-year ensemble project to show all the history plays with one set of actors. Most of the original cast (except Oyelowo, McArdle and one or two others) remained the same, though few played the same part(s) as in the original production. The part of Henry VI, however, was still played by a black actor, this time Chuk Iwuji.
