= Sonny Green =

English rapper, spoken-word poet and actor

- Occupations: Rapper; spoken-word poet; actor

Sonny Green is an English rapper, spoken-word poet and actor from Southend-on-Sea, Essex. He released the EP Grime Is Punk in 2016 and has appeared as an actor in the film Still and the BBC Scotland soap opera River City. In 2026, Green reached the final of the nineteenth series of Britain's Got Talent, after receiving Simon Cowell's live-show Golden Buzzer during the semi-finals.

== Career ==
=== Music ===
Green began performing as a grime rapper as a teenager. In 2016, he released the EP Grime Is Punk, which was reviewed by music publication XS Noize. The track "Bars" was released ahead of the EP and featured by GRM Daily. GRM Daily also featured music videos for tracks including "Fuck Off", "Why Would I", "Expressing Myself" and "22" between 2016 and 2017.

In July 2026, Green released the single "We're Telling 'Em", which reached number 17 on the Official Singles Sales Chart and number 15 on the Official Singles Downloads Chart.

=== Acting ===
In 2014, Green appeared as Finn in the BBC Scotland soap opera River City. The same year, he was a principal cast member in the British drama film Still, playing Carl.

Green's performance in Still was discussed by reviewers for Eye for Film and Entertainment.ie.

=== Spoken word and Britain's Got Talent ===
Green later began performing spoken-word poetry. In March 2026, he performed the poem "What Southend Means to Me" as part of Southend City Day.

In 2026, Green competed as a spoken-word poet in the nineteenth series of Britain's Got Talent. During the fourth live semi-final, he performed a poem addressed to his sons. Simon Cowell awarded the performance his Golden Buzzer, sending Green directly to the final.

Green competed in the final on 30 May 2026. ITV's published voting figures showed that he received 8.66 per cent of the final vote, placing sixth overall.

Following the competition, Green told BBC Essex that he hoped to develop a theatre tour and encourage more people to engage with spoken-word poetry. He said that he wanted the art form to be accessible regardless of a person's accent, background or education.

== Filmography ==
Year	Title	Role	Notes
2014	River City (TV series)	Finn	Television series
2014	Still	Carl	Film

== Discography ==
=== Extended plays ===
- Grime Is Punk (2016)
