= Moses the Black (film) =

- Theatrical release poster
- Directed by: Yelena Popovic
- Written by: Yelena Popovic
- Produced by: Alexandros Potter; Yelena Popovic
- Starring: Omar Epps; Wiz Khalifa; Quavo; Chukwudi Iwuji
- Cinematography: Panagiotis Vasilakis
- Edited by: Dimitris Tzetzas
- Music by: Kostas Christides
- Production companies: G-Unit Films and Television Inc.; BrooklynWorks Films; Cinematic Fund; Cinespace Film Studios; Simeon Entertainment; Taylor Gang Films
- Distributed by: Fathom Entertainment
- Release date: January 30, 2026
- Running time: 104 minutes
- Country: United States
- Language: English

Moses the Black is a 2026 American crime drama film written and directed by Yelena Popovic and starring Omar Epps, Wiz Khalifa, Quavo and Chukwudi Iwuji. It follows the journey of a leader of a gang who questions his lifestyle when he starts having visions of Saint Moses the Black, who was also once a gang leader.

== Plot ==
After being released from prison, Malik returns to being a gang leader in West Side, Chicago. He learns that his closest friend Sayeed was murdered by a rival gang and orders his gang to kill one of their members in retaliation. Malik's grandmother, a devout Christian who prays for Malik often, gives him a small icon of Moses the Black, describing him as a former gang leader who became a saint. Soon after, she dies.

At her funeral, the rival gang does a drive-by shooting intending to kill Malik, but one of his gang members is hit instead. Malik later has a panic attack and picks up the icon of Moses the Black, then has a dream in which the saint tells him: "He who lives by the sword shall die by the sword." Malik shares this with his friend Mike, a gang member who sees no conflict between his gang lifestyle and his devout Christian faith. He identifies the words as being from Jesus and encourages Malik to read the Bible himself.

Troubled by his visions, Malik chooses not to authorize a retaliation against the rival gang, and some like 2wo-3ree are concerned that Malik is no longer fit to lead them. Even Mike becomes concerned when Malik suggests they end their life of crime, becoming upset when Malik quotes the Bible to him. Malik finally visits his grandmother's church and tells the priest that he is having dreams about Saint Moses the Black. The priest says they mean that God is calling him to change his life before it's too late.

Meanwhile, gang member Lil B was part of an embarrassing incident that became the subject of a viral video created by the rival gang. Humiliated, he decides on his own to kill one of the rival gang members responsible. This results in a shootout between the two gangs, during which Malik has the realization that "the thief went to heaven first." 2wo-3ree is shot, his dying words asking Malik if he'll get into heaven.

After leaving a picture of Sayeed and himself next to the church's icon of Moses the Black, Malik makes a deal with the rival gang to end the fighting in exchange for turning himself over to the police, with the assurance that he will confess his crimes alone and refuse to be a rat. He returns to prison and has a vision of Moses the Black anticipating being martyred by bandits and repeating: "Lord, have mercy". Malik says those words himself and asks for mercy on those in his gang before two inmates sneak up and stab him. Malik dies saying: "Remember us in your kingdom." The final title card quotes Matthew 21:31: "Verily I say unto you, that the publicans and the harlots go into the kingdom of God before you."

== Cast ==
- Omar Epps as Malik
- Wiz Khalifa as 2wo-3ree
- Quavo as Straw
- Chukwudi Iwuji as St. Moses the Black
- Corey Hendrix
- Ahmad Ferguson

== Production ==
Director and writer Yelena Popovic got the idea to write the film in 2018 when she read about the life of the titular saint and decided the story would resonate better with audiences if it were told from the perspective of the modern day. She consulted those involved with gang violence prevention in Chicago and wanted to accurately portray the city as well as "bring an incredible message of redemption." Popovic intended to create a Christian film that inspired more than lectured.

Production began without adequate funding or the involvement of 50 Cent or Quavo. Popovic described this period saying: "It was just this hope and desire to do justice to Saint Moses, and also to the whole community, which showed so much love and respect that gave me courage to fight and to not give up."

Popovic sought to increase authenticity by casting actors from Chicago as well as those who were not traditional actors such as rap superstars and heavyweight boxers. In March 2025, it was announced that Epps, Khalifa, Quavo and Iwuji were cast in the film. In September that same year, it was announced that Hendrix and Ferguson were also cast in the film.

Epps was initially unfamiliar with Moses the Black, but after research found that his story "spoke to him as an individual." Raised in New York, he worked with a dialogue coach to be able to provide a Chicago accent.

In October 2025, it was announced that principal photography wrapped in Chicago.

== Release ==
Moses the Black premiered in Los Angeles on January 20, 2026 with guests including professed religious and stars from Instagram. It received a general release in the United States on January 30, 2026.

== Reception ==
Craig D. Lindsey of RogerEbert.com awarded the film one and a half stars out of four, commending the soulfulness of Epps' scenes while finding the scenes featuring Khalifa, Quavo, and Chamberlain to be ridiculous. Robert Daniles of The New York Times compared the film to Spike Lee's Chi-Raq and described it as "an earnest work that jostles jarringly against spiritual revelations on one side and nonsensical subplots on the other." In contrast, Emedo Ashibeze of Screen Rant gave a positive review, praising key moments of dialogue and saying the performances of the rappers fit naturally with those of the traditional actors.
