= The Low Road (play) =

Play by Bruce Norris

The Low Road is a 2013 play by the American playwright Bruce Norris. It premiered from 23 March to 11 May 2013 at the Royal Court Theatre in London, in a production directed by Dominic Cooke (his final production as artistic director of that theatre) and with a cast including Bill Paterson, Johnny Flynn, Kobna-Holdbrook Smith, Simon Paisley Day, Elizabeth Berrington, Ian Gelder, Ellie Kendrick and John Ramm.

The play focuses on the economic theories of Adam Smith, who acts as the narrator, first by showing us an 18th-century story in which Jim Trumpett, a young American of illegitimate birth and raised in a brothel, stumbles upon Smith's The Wealth of Nations and becomes a convert to the new theories of capitalism, and then showing us, through a contemporary scene featuring a G8 summit, that our thinking hasn't changed at all. Theater critic Paul Taylor claims that the play was motivated by the 2008 financial crisis and the failure of the banking community to change their behaviors.
