= Chukwudi Iwuji =

Nigerian and British actor (born 1975)

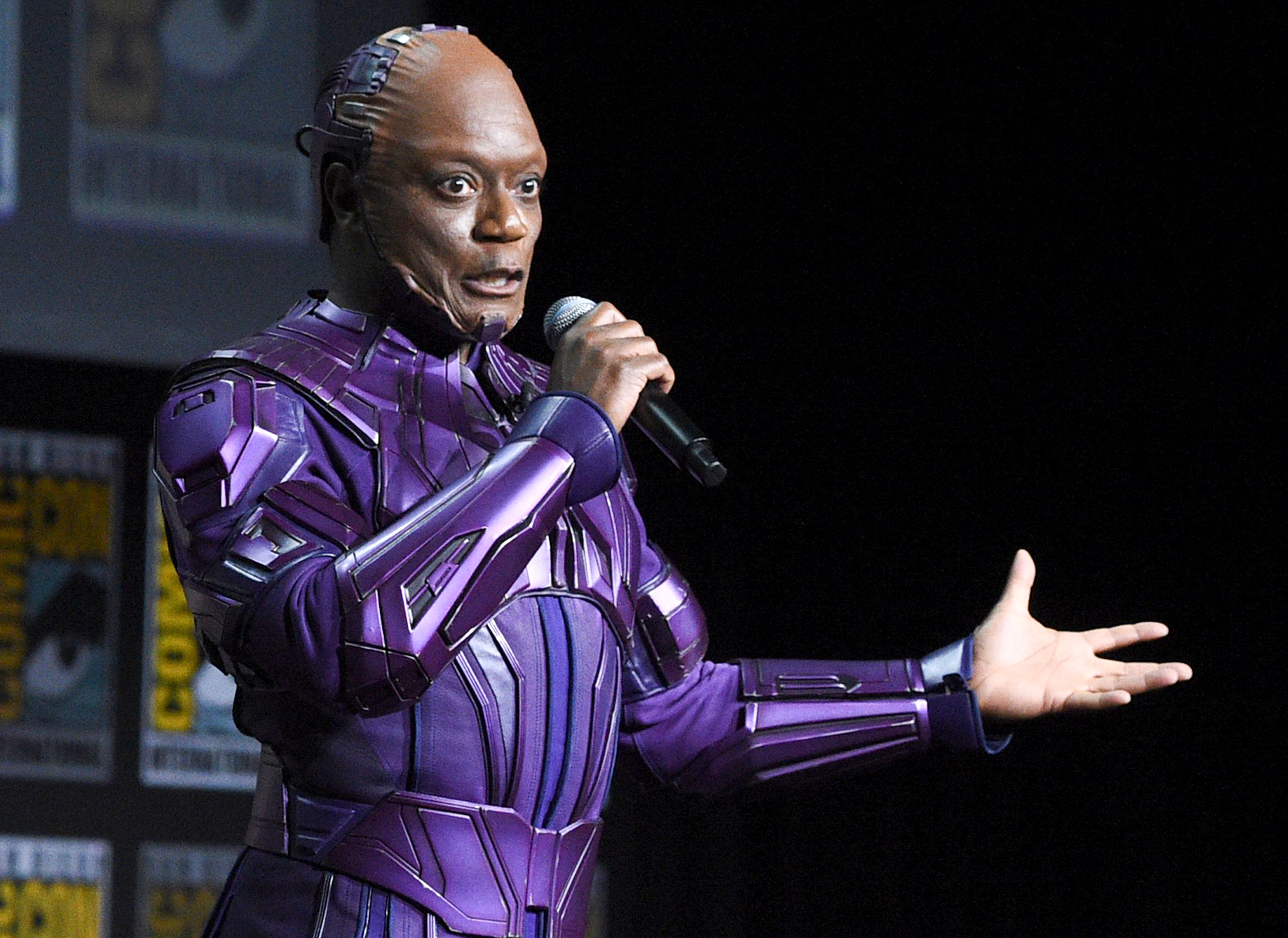
- Iwuji in costume as the High Evolutionary at San Diego Comic-Con in 2022
- Born: 15 October 1975 (age 51); Nigeria
- Education: Caterham School; Yale University (BA); University of Wisconsin-Milwaukee (MFA)
- Occupation: Actor
- Years active: 2005–present
- Spouse: Angela Travino

Chukwudi Iwuji // (/ˈtʃʊkʊdi ɪˈwuːdʒi/; born 15 October 1975) is a Nigerian-British actor. He is an Associate Artist for the Royal Shakespeare Company. He is known for his roles as Clemson Murn / Ik Nobe Lok in the first season of the HBO Max superhero series Peacemaker, as The High Evolutionary in the Marvel Cinematic Universe (MCU) film Guardians of the Galaxy Vol. 3 (2023), and as Osita Halcrow in the Peacock show The Day of the Jackal (2024−present).

== Early life, family and education ==
Iwuji was born in Nigeria to diplomat parents; he is one of five siblings. When Iwuji was 10 years old, his parents began working for the United Nations, and the family moved to Ethiopia.

At the age of 12 in 1987, Iwuji attended Caterham, a British public school. In 1993 when he was in the Upper Sixth Form, he was made Head Boy and was the first black pupil to be so in the school's history.

After graduating, he attended Yale University, earning his undergraduate degree in economics in 1997. He obtained his MFA at the Professional Theatre Training Program (PTTP) at The University of Wisconsin-Milwaukee in 2000. Subsequently, he returned to the UK.

== Career ==
=== Theatre ===
Iwuji began to perform at the Royal Shakespeare Company in 2001. He had roles in Edward Hall's production of Julius Caesar and as Claudius in Hamlet, both in 2001. In 2002, he played Fenton in The Merry Wives of Windsor and Aufidius in Coriolanus. In 2006, he replaced David Oyelowo in the title role of the Henry VI trilogy in the revival of the This England: The Histories project. Iwuji described the role, "In Henry VI, the musicality is different: the thoughts are very structured." The production won the Olivier Award for Best Revival.

In 2013, Iwuji played Enobarbus in the Caribbean-themed Antony and Cleopatra directed by Tarell Alvin McCraney that was a joint production between the RSC and The Public Theater in New York. In 2014, he played Edgar in King Lear. In 2016, he played Hamlet for The Public's Mobile Unit, and he described his portrayal of the role as "this ugly, relentless beast that’s about to be unleashed." In 2018, he starred as Othello at the Delacorte Theater for Shakespeare in the Park opposite Corey Stoll as Iago, and as Blanke in The Low Road at the Public.

Iwuji has worked with numerous other theaters. In 2002, he was in Peter Hall 's Bacchai at the Royal National Theatre. He played Booth in Topdog/Underdog Christy in Playboy of the Western World at the Abbey Theatre in Dublin, Julian in Thea Sharrock's production of The Misanthrope, and played in the large cast of The Vote at the Donmar Warehouse in 2015. He performed at the Royal National Theatre in Welcome to Thebes in 2010, the Old Vic in a 2011 Richard III, in 2014 off-Broadway in Tamburlaine for which theater critic Ben Brantley called him "a standout," and in 2016–17 with director Ivo van Hove in both Obsession and Hedda Gabler.

=== Television ===
Iwuji appeared on a number of shows, including the Doctor Who episodes "The Impossible Astronaut" / "Day of the Moon" (2011). He performed in Barry Jenkins's 2021 miniseries The Underground Railroad. In 2018, became a series regular on the legal drama The Split, and he also played the King of France for the BBC recording of King Lear which starred Anthony Hopkins, Emma Thompson, and Florence Pugh. He had a recurring role on Netflix's When They See Us and Designated Survivor in 2019, and he starred in Peacemaker in 2022. In 2026, Iwuji guessed starred in Law & Order: Special Victims Unit.

=== Film ===
Iwuji was in the 2016 film Barry and played Akoni in John Wick: Chapter 2 in 2017. In 2023, he portrayed the High Evolutionary in Guardians of the Galaxy Vol. 3.

== Personal life ==
Iwuji lives in New York with his wife, actress/singer Angela Travino.

== Filmography ==
Key
| † | Denotes works that have not yet been released |

=== Film ===
| Year | Title | Role | Notes |
|---|---|---|---|
| 2009 | Exam | Black | |
| 2016 | Barry | Ephraim | |
| 2017 | John Wick: Chapter 2 | Akoni | |
| 2018 | Bikini Moon | Adam | |
| 2018 | Rosy | Manager | |
| 2019 | Daniel Isn't Real | Braun | |
| 2020 | Shine Your Eyes | Ikenna Igbomaeze | |
| 2020 | News of the World | Charles Edgefield | Uncredited |
| 2023 | Guardians of the Galaxy Vol. 3 | High Evolutionary | |
| 2025 | Play Dirty | Phineas Paul | |
| 2026 | Moses the Black | St. Moses the Black | |

=== Television ===
| Year | Title | Role | Notes |
|---|---|---|---|
| 2005 | Proof | Jake Zaria | 4 episodes |
| 2005 | Casualty | Daniel Peel | 1 episode |
| 2011 | Doctor Who | Carl | 2 episodes |
| 2012 | Wizards vs Aliens | Adams | 2 episodes |
| 2015 | Crossing Lines | Fabrice Wombosi | 2 episodes |
| 2016 | Madam Secretary | Hadi Bangote | 1 episode |
| 2016 | Blindspot | Oscar's Friend | 1 episode |
| 2018 | King Lear | King of France | Television film |
| 2018 | Quantico | Dante Warick | 1 episode |
| 2018–2022 | The Split | Alexander Hale | Recurring role, 18 episodes |
| 2019 | When They See Us | Colin Moore | Miniseries, 2 episodes |
| 2019 | Designated Survivor | Dr. Eli Mays | Recurring role, 8 episodes |
| 2019 | Dynasty | Landon | 1 episode |
| 2021 | The Underground Railroad | Mingo | Miniseries, 2 episodes |
| 2022 | Peacemaker | Clemson Murn / Ik Nobe Lok | Main role, 8 episodes |
| 2024 | Evil | Father Dominic Kabiru | Recurring role, 6 episodes |
| 2024–present | The Day of the Jackal | Osita Halcrow | Main role, 10 episodes |
| 2026 | Law & Order: Special Victims Unit | Charles Greene | Episode: "Obedience" |

== Accolades ==
- 2018 Lucille Lortel - nominated for Lead Actor in a Play
- 2018 - Obie Award Winner - Performance for The Low Road (play)
- 2018 Drama League Award Nominee, Distinguished Performance for The Low Road (play)
