= Complete Works (RSC festival) =

Early 21st-century theatre festival in Stratford-upon-Avon

The Complete Works was a festival set up by the Royal Shakespeare Company, running between April 2006 and March 2007 at Stratford-upon-Avon, Warwickshire, England. The festival aimed to perform all of Shakespeare's works, including his sonnets, poems and all 37 plays. The RSC claims that this was their largest project in its history.

The performances had several famous actors and actresses, including Ian McKellen, Patrick Stewart, Judi Dench, and Tamsin Greig. It also contained performances from other parts of the world, including performances in different languages.

== Performances ==
All of the works are listed in chronological order of their first night of their performance.

- Romeo and Juliet Starring Rupert Evans and Morven Christie. Directed by Nancy Meckler.
- Antony and Cleopatra Starring Patrick Stewart and Harriet Walter. Directed by Gregory Doran.
- Othello Starring Munich Kammerspiele. Directed by Luk Perceval
- Hamlet Starring Vanesgran Arumugam. Directed by Janet Suzman.
- Julius Caesar Starring James Hayes. Directed by Sean Holmes.
- Much Ado About Nothing Starring Tamsin Greig and Joseph Millson. Directed by Marianne Elliott.
- The Two Noble Kinsmen Directed by William Oldroyd.
- A Midsummer Night's Dream Performed in both English and several Indian languages. Directed by Tim Supple.
- Titus Andronicus In Japanese with English surtitles. Directed by Yukio Ninagawa.
- Henry IV From the Chicago Shakespeare Theater's production. Directed by Barbara Gaines.
- Henry VI Starring Chuk Iwuji. Directed Michael Boyd.
- King John Starring Richard McCabe. Directed by Josie Rourke.
- The Tempest Starring Patrick Stewart. Directed by Rupert Goold.
- Love's Labour's Lost From the Shakespeare Theatre Company. Directed Michael Kahn.
- Henry VIII Starring Antony Byrne. Directed by Gregory Thompson.
- Troilus and Cressida Starring Henry Pettigrew and Annabel Scholey. Directed by Peter Stein.
- The Rape of Lucrece Directed by Gregory Doran.
- Measure For Measure Starring Richard Dormer. Directed by Peter Hall.
- Cymbeline Directed by Emma Rice.
- Timon of Athens Directed by Adrian Jackson.
- The Winter's Tale Directed by Dominic Cooke.
- Pericles Starring Lucian Msamati. Directed by Dominic Cooke.
- The Taming of the Shrew Directed by Edward Hall.
- The Phoenix and the Turtle Read by Michael Wood.
- As You Like It Starring Eve Best. Directed by Samuel West. A Sheffield Theatres production.
- Richard II In German with English surtitles. Directed by Claus Peymann.
- Merry Wives The Musical A musical version of The Merry Wives of Windsor starring Judi Dench. Directed by Gregory Doran.
- Richard III Starring Jonathan Slinger. Directed by Michael Boyd.
- Henry V Directed by Pippo Delbono.
- Macbeth Parts in Polish. Directed by Grzegorz Bral.
- Coriolanus Starring William Houston. Directed by Gregory Doran.
- Twelfth Night In Russian with English surtitles. Directed by Declan Donnellan.
- Venus and Adonis Directed by Gregory Doran.
- The Merchant of Venice Starring F. Murray Abraham. Directed by Cicely Berry.
- King Lear Starring Ian McKellen. Directed by Trevor Nunn.
- Capulets And Motagues Starring Jeff Leach. Directed by Heather Davies.

== Awards ==
During the season, some people won awards for their performances. Most notably, Tamsin Greig won two awards for her role as Beatrice in Much Ado About Nothing. She won both a Laurence Olivier Awards for best actress and Critics' Circle Award for best Shakespearean performance, the first woman ever to win the award.
