= Michael Boyd (theatre director) =

British theatre director (1955–2023)

Sir Michael Boyd HonFRSE
- Born: 6 July 1955; Belfast, Northern Ireland
- Died: 3 August 2023 (aged 68)
- Occupations: Theatre director, former artistic director
- Partner: Caroline Hall
- Children: 3

Sir Michael Boyd HonFRSE (6 July 1955 – 3 August 2023) was a British theatre director and an artistic director of the Royal Shakespeare Company.

== Early years ==
Michael Boyd was born in Belfast, Northern Ireland, on 6 July 1955. He was educated at Latymer Upper School in London, Daniel Stewart's College in Edinburgh, and at the University of Edinburgh, where he gained an M.A. in English Literature and performed with the Edinburgh University Drama Society.

== Career ==
Boyd trained as a director at the Malaya Bronnaya Theatre in Moscow, and in 1979 took up his first post as a trainee director at the Belgrade Theatre in Coventry, graduating to Assistant Director a year later.

In 1982, he joined the Sheffield Crucible as an Associate Director, where he directed Mayakovsky's Mystere Bouffe and the premiere of Commedia by Marcella Evaristi. Other productions included A Passion in Six Days at the Royal Court in March 1984, Othello at the Lyric, Hammersmith, Hedda Gabler at the Leicester Haymarket and The Alchemist for Cambridge Theatre Company.

In October 1984 he became Artistic Director of the Tron Theatre in Glasgow, where he staged a production of Macbeth starring Iain Glen, an adaptation of Janice Galloway's The Trick is to Keep Breathing and Michel Tremblay's Quebec plays, The Real World? and The Guid Sisters, in Scots translations by Martin Bowman and Bill Findlay. In 1987 he invited Alan Cumming and Forbes Masson to write and star in Babes in the Wood as their alter egos Victor and Barry at the Tron. Other Tron productions include MacBeth Possessed, Ghost Story, Terrestrial Extras, The Marble Madonna, McGrotty and Ludmilla, Muir, Sleeping Beauty, Philadelphia, Here I Come!, Doctor Faustus, The Funeral and Losing Alec.

Boyd joined the RSC in 1996 as an Associate Director, staging the three parts of Henry VI together with Richard III at the Young Vic in London in April 2002, as part of the This England: Histories Cycle.

During this time he was also Drama Director of the New Beginnings Festival of Soviet Arts in Glasgow in 1999, and directed Miss Julie in the Frank McGuinness version at the Theatre Royal Haymarket in February 2000.

Taking over from Adrian Noble in 2003, Boyd assumed control of the RSC, burdened with a deficit of £2.8m, with a remit to turn its fortunes around. He ran a year-long Complete Works of Shakespeare Festival (begun in April 2006 and involving other companies as well as the RSC) and a London season at the Novello Theatre.

In 2007, he launched the long-awaited redevelopment of the Royal Shakespeare Theatre. This included construction of the temporary Courtyard Theatre to provide a Stratford venue while work was in progress. It was designed to house The Histories cycle, before its transfer to the Roundhouse in London in 2008. He brought Michael Fentiman into the RSC as part of his 2009 - 2011 Long Ensemble Project.

In 2022, Boyd directed the Edinburgh International Festival production of Liz Lochhead's adaptation of Medea, with Adura Onashile in the title role.

Boyd regularly collaborated with stage designer Tom Piper since they first worked together on a pantomime for the Tron Theatre in Glasgow.

== Personal life ==
In 1982 he married the actor and playwright Marcella Evaristi. After their divorce, he lived with his partner Caroline Hall in London from 1991.

== Death ==
On 3 August 2023, the Royal Shakespeare Company released a statement from his family announcing his death from cancer. He was 68.

== Honours ==
Boyd was knighted in the 2012 Birthday Honours for services to drama and was elected an Honorary Fellow of the Royal Society of Edinburgh in March 2016.
