= Patrick Myles =

Actor, writer/director, producer

Patrick Myles is an actor, writer, director and producer who trained at the Bristol Old Vic Theatre School.

== Early life and education ==
He was born in Nicosia, Cyprus and also lived in Moira, Northern Ireland, where he attended Wallace High School, Lisburn, before moving back to Cyprus and attending The English School, Nicosia.

== Writing and directing ==
His short films as writer or director include Santa's Blotto starring Brian Blessed.

In 2016 he made A Pornographer Woos starring Michael Smiley, adapted from Bernard MacLaverty's short story.

He adapted and directed a short film of Nikolai Gogol's The Overcoat, starring Jason Watkins and Tim Key, which was long-listed for British Short Film BAFTA in 2019. In 2024, he adapted and directed Nikolai Gogol's The Government Inspector at the Marylebone Theatre, starring Kiell Smith-Bynoe, Dan Skinner and Martha Howe-Douglas, and in 2026 he co-translated and directed Brian Friel's Translations at the Theatrical Organization of Cyprus.

== Producing ==
After producing several summer Shakespeare productions in Cyprus, his first West End credit was David Mamet's Glengarry Glen Ross at the Apollo Theatre, with Jonathan Pryce and Aidan Gillen. Alongside David Luff, he commissioned and produced the stage adaptation of Paddy Chayefsky's Network, adapted by Lee Hall, directed by Ivo van Hove and starring Bryan Cranston, which opened at the National Theatre before transferring to the Belasco Theatre on Broadway. He commissioned and produced the stage adaptation of Stanley Kubrick's Dr. Strangelove, adapted by Armando Iannucci and Sean Foley, and starring Steve Coogan at the Noël Coward Theatre.

In 2026, he produced Arthur Miller's The Price, starring Henry Goodman. and it was announced he would be producing a new adaptation of Tartuffe starring Mark Rylance.

== Selected works ==
=== Stage ===
Theatre
| Year | Title | Role | Notes |
|---|---|---|---|
| 2002 | Othello | Iago | Midas Touch Productions |
| 2003 | Victoria Station | Controller | King's Head Theatre |
| 2003 | Romeo and Juliet | Mercutio | Midas Touch Productions |
| 2004 | Love's a Luxury | Dick | Orange Tree Theatre |
| 2004 | A Chorus of Disapproval | Crispin | Stephen Joseph Theatre |
| 2004 | Tartuffe | Valere | Arcola Theatre |
| 2005 | The Freedom of the City | Constable | Finborough Theatre |
| 2006 | The Revenger's Tragedy | Lussorioso | Southwark Playhouse |
| 2006 | A Family Affair | Associate producer | Arcola Theatre |
| 2007 | The Lady's Not for Burning | Richard | Finborough Theatre |
| 2007 | Glengarry Glen Ross | Producer | Apollo Theatre, Shaftesbury Avenue |
| 2009 | The Spanish Tragedy | Lorenzo | Arcola Theatre |
| 2010 | Romeo and Juliet | Romeo | Creation Theatre |
| 2012 | The Hairy Ape | Secretary | Southwark Playhouse |
| 2013 | Henry VI, Part One | Reignier | Shakespeare's Globe |
| 2013 | Henry VI, Part Two | Edward, Earl of March | Shakespeare's Globe |
| 2013 | Henry VI, Part Three | Edward IV | Shakespeare's Globe |
| 2016 | Much Ado About Nothing | Benedick | Shakespeare in the Squares |
| 2017 | Network | Producer | National Theatre |
| 2017 | Lady Day at Emerson's Bar and Grill | Associate producer | Wyndham's Theatre |
| 2018 | The Unexpected Guest | Julian Farrar | The Mill at Sonning |
| 2019 | Network | Producer | Belasco Theatre |
| 2019 | Fleabag | Producer | SoHo Playhouse |
| 2019 | Towards Zero | Thomas Royde | The Mill at Sonning |
| 2022 | American Buffalo | Producer | Circle in the Square |
| 2022 | Hangmen | Producer | Golden Theater |
| 2022 | The Lavender Hill Mob | Producer | Cheltenham Everyman |
| 2023 | Pictures from Home | Producer | Studio 54 |
| 2024 | The Government Inspector | Adaptor/director | Marylebone Theatre |
| 2024 | Dr Strangelove | Producer | Noël Coward Theatre |
| 2025 | Glengarry Glen Ross | Producer | Palace Theatre |
| 2026 | Translations | Director | Cyprus National Theatre |
| 2026 | The Price | Producer | Marylebone Theatre |
| 2026 | Tartuffe | Producer | Marylebone Theatre |

=== Television ===
Television
| Year | Title | Role | Notes |
|---|---|---|---|
| 2005 | The Bill | Fenton | ITV |
| 2006 | Secret Smile | Harry | ITV |
| 2006 | Planespotting | George | ITV |
| 2015 | Doctors | Sam | BBC |
| 2017 | EastEnders | Gary | BBC |
| 2024 | Industry | Anthony | HBO/BBC |

== Awards and nominations ==
Awards and nominations
| Year | Award | Category | Work | Result |
|---|---|---|---|---|
| 2018 | Laurence Olivier Awards | Best New Play | Network | Nominated |
| 2019 | New Renaissance Film Festival | Best Director | The Overcoat | Won |
| 2019 | Norwich Film Festival | Best Short Film | The Overcoat | Nominated |
| 2019 | Birmingham Film Festival | Best Short Film | The Overcoat | Nominated |
| 2019 | Dinard Film Festival | Best Short Film | The Overcoat | Nominated |
| 2019 | Lucille Lortel Award | Outstanding Solo Show | Fleabag | Won |
| 2022 | Tony Award | Best Play | Hangmen | Nominated |
| 2022 | Tony Award | Best Revival | American Buffalo | Nominated |
