= Henry VI, Part 3 =

1591 play by Shakespeare

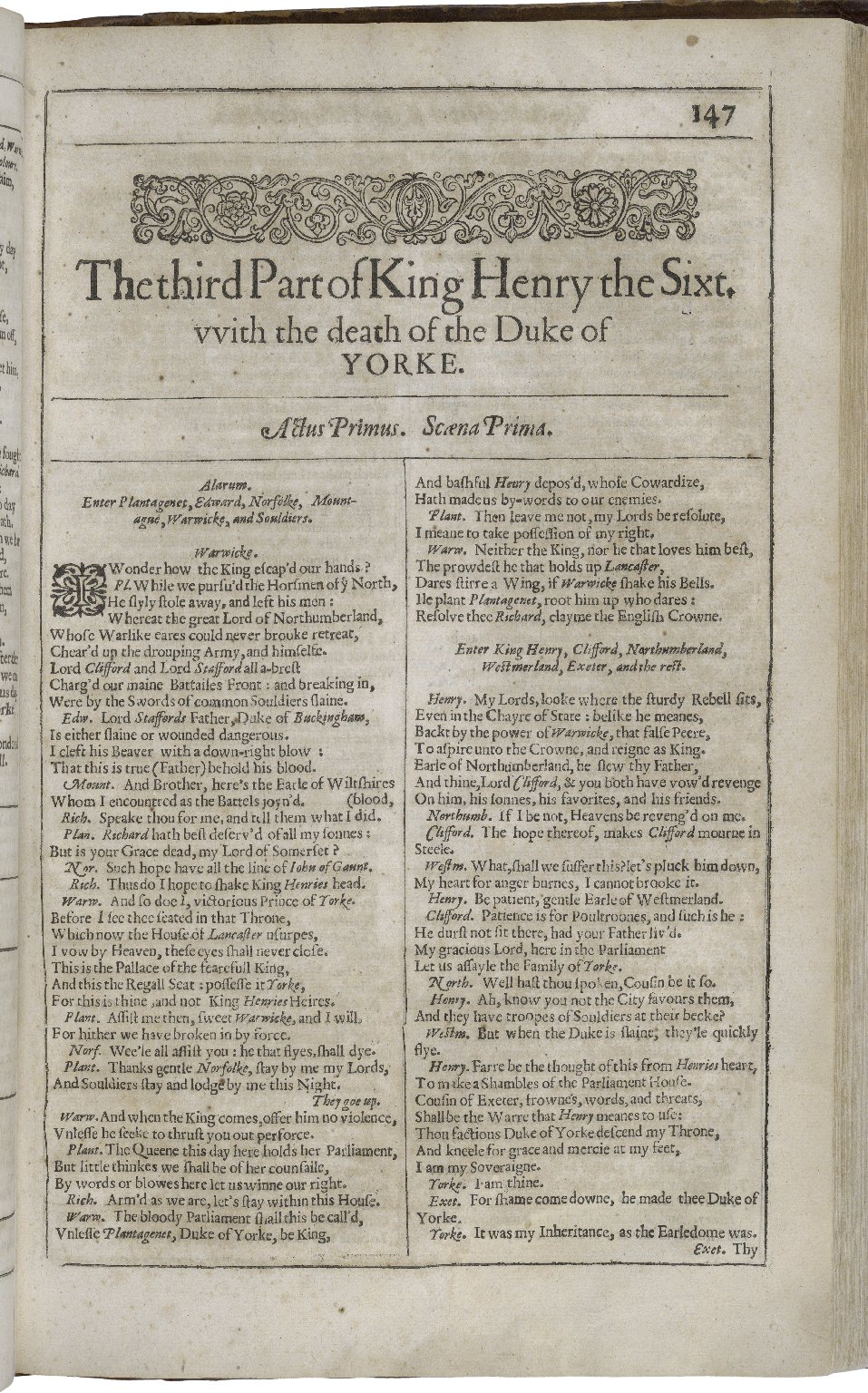
First page of The third Part of Henry the Sixt, with the death of the Duke of Yorke from the First Folio (1623)

Henry VI, Part 3 (often written as 3 Henry VI) is a history play commonly attributed to William Shakespeare. It is believed to have been written in 1591 and set during the lifetime of King Henry VI of England. Whereas 1 Henry VI primarily deals with the loss of England's French territories and 2 Henry VI focuses on domestic quarrels leading to the Wars of the Roses, 3 Henry VI deals primarily with the horrors of that conflict now that it has started.

Although the Henry VI trilogy may not have been written in chronological order, the three plays are often grouped together with Richard III to form a tetralogy covering the entire Wars of the Roses saga, from the death of Henry V in 1422 to the rise to power of Henry VII in 1485.

Henry VI, Part 3 features one of the longest soliloquies in all of Shakespeare (3.2.124–195), only beat by Love's Labour's Lost. It has more battle scenes (four on stage, one reported) than any other of Shakespeare's plays.

== Characters ==
Of the King's Party

- King Henry VI – King of England
- Queen Margaret – Queen to Henry VI
- Edward, Prince of Wales – their son
- Lord Clifford – military commander
- Duke of Exeter – Henry VI's second cousin
- Duke of Somerset (a conflation of Henry Beaufort, 3rd Duke of Somerset and Edmund Beaufort, 4th Duke of Somerset, his younger brother) – Henry VI's second cousin
- Earl of Northumberland – Henry VI's second cousin
- Earl of Westmorland – Henry VI's second cousin
- Earl of Oxford
- Henry, Earl of Richmond (as a boy, later Henry VII, non-speaking role) – Henry VI's nephew
- Somerville – messenger

Of the Duke of York's Party

- Richard Plantagenet, Duke of York – Henry VI's second cousin once removed, asserts he should be King
- Edward Plantagenet, Earl of March – later King Edward IV; York's eldest son
- George Plantagenet – later Duke of Clarence; York's son and Warwick's son-in-law
- Richard Plantagenet – later Duke of Gloucester; York's son
- Edmund Plantagenet, Earl of Rutland – York's youngest son
- Robert Aspell, Rutland's tutor
- Earl of Warwick – York's nephew
- Duke of Norfolk – York's nephew
- Montague (two different 'versions' of the character appear in the play, each one representing a different historical figure. The Act 1 persona is that of the Earl of Salisbury, Warwick's father, and a major character in 2 Henry VI. From Act 2 onwards, the character represents Salisbury's son and Warwick's younger brother John Neville, Marquis of Montague)
- Earl of Pembroke (non-speaking role)
- Lord Stafford (non-speaking role)
- Lord Hastings
- Sir William Stanley
- Sir John Mortimer – York's uncle
- Sir Hugh Mortimer – York's uncle (non-speaking role)
- Sir John Montgomery
- Lady Grey – later Queen Elizabeth to Edward IV
- Lord Rivers – her brother
- Prince Edward – Elizabeth and Edward IV's son (non-speaking role)

The French

- King Louis XI of France
- Lady Bona of Savoy – Louis' sister-in-law
- Lord Bourbon – Admiral of France (non-speaking role)

Others

- Thomas of Beverley, Mayor of York
- Two aldermen of York (non-speaking roles)
- John Brett, Mayor of Coventry (non-speaking role)
- Lieutenant of the Tower (a conflation of John Tiptoft, 1st Earl of Worcester and John Sutton, 6th Baron Dudley)
- Son that kills his father
- Father that kills his son
- Nurse (non-speaking role)
- Nobleman
- Two gamekeepers
- Three Watchmen
- Huntsman
- Soldiers, messengers, drummers, attendants, etc.

== Synopsis ==
The play begins where 2 Henry VI left off, with the victorious Yorkists (Duke of York, Edward, Richard, Warwick, Montague [i.e. Salisbury] and Norfolk) pursuing Henry and Margaret from the battlefield in the wake of the First Battle of St Albans (1455).

Upon reaching the parliamentary chambers in London, York seats himself in the throne, and a confrontation ensues between his supporters and Henry's. Threatened by Warwick, who has brought part of his army with him, the King reaches an agreement with York which will allow him to remain king until his death, at which time the throne will permanently pass to the House of York and its descendants. Disgusted with this decision — which would disinherit the King's son, Prince Edward — the King's supporters, led by his wife Margaret, abandon him, and Margaret declares war on the Yorkists, supported by Clifford, who is determined to exact revenge for the death of his father at the hands of York during the battle of St Albans.

Margaret attacks York's castle at Wakefield, and the Yorkists lose the ensuing battle (1460). During the conflict, Clifford murders York's twelve-year-old son, Rutland. Margaret and Clifford then capture and taunt York himself; forcing him to stand on a molehill, they give him a handkerchief covered with Rutland's blood to wipe his brow, and place a paper crown on his head, before stabbing him to death.

After the battle, Warwick brings news that his own army has been defeated by Margaret's at the Second Battle of St Albans (1461), and that the King has revoked his agreement with York due to Margaret's pressure. However, George Plantagenet, Richard and Edward's brother, has vowed to join their cause, having been encouraged to do so by his sister, the Duchess of Burgundy. Additionally, Warwick has been joined in the conflict by his own younger brother, Montague.

The Yorkists regroup, and at the Battle of Towton (1461), Clifford is killed and the Yorkists are victorious. During the battle, Henry sits on a molehill and laments his problems. He observes a father who has killed his son, and a son who has killed his father, representing the horrors of the civil war. Following his victory, Edward is proclaimed king and the House of York is established on the English throne. George is proclaimed Duke of Clarence and Richard, Duke of Gloucester, although he complains to Edward that this is an ominous dukedom. King Edward and George then leave the court, and Richard reveals to the audience his ambition to rise to power and take the throne from his brother.

After Towton, Warwick goes to France to secure for Edward the hand of Louis XI's sister-in-law, Lady Bona, thus ensuring peace between the two nations. Warwick arrives at the French court to find that Margaret, Prince Edward and the Earl of Oxford have come to Louis to seek his aid in the conflict in England. Just as Louis is about to agree to supply Margaret with troops, Warwick intervenes, and convinces Louis that it is in his interests to support Edward and approve the marriage.

Back in England, however, the recently widowed Lady Grey (Elizabeth Woodville) has come to King Edward requesting her late husband's lands be returned to her. Edward is captivated by her beauty and promises to return her husband's lands to her if she becomes his mistress, but she repeatedly continues to refuse Edward — despite sexually-charged banter — on the grounds of preserving her honour. Edward declares that she is clever and virtuous as well as beautiful, and decides to marry her against the advice of both George and Richard.

Upon hearing this, Warwick, feeling he has been made to look foolish, denounces Edward, and switches allegiance to the Lancastrians. He promises his daughter Anne's hand in marriage to Prince Edward as a sign of his loyalty. George and Montague also defect to the Lancastrians.

Warwick then invades England with French troops, and King Edward is taken prisoner and conveyed to Warwick's brother, the Archbishop of York, while heavily pregnant Lady Grey (now Queen Elizabeth) flees to sanctuary.

However, Edward is soon rescued by Richard, Lord Hastings and Sir William Stanley. Henry, now restored to the throne, appoints Warwick and George as his Lords Protector. News of the escape reaches Henry's court, and the young Earl of Richmond is sent into exile in Brittany for safety. Richmond is a potential Lancastrian heir should anything happen to Henry and his son; hence the need to protect him.

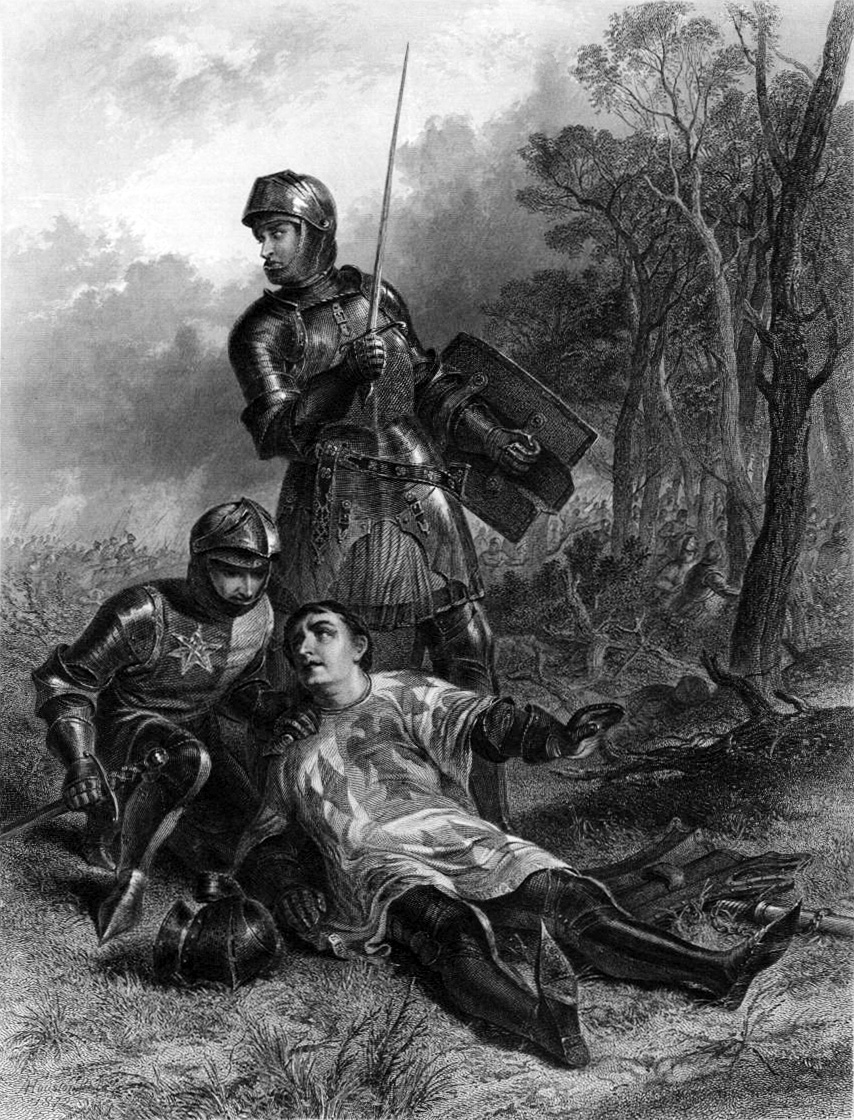
T. Brown engraving of The Death of the Earl of Warwick by John Adam Houston, from The Works of Shakespeare: Imperial Edition, edited by Charles Knight (1870)

Edward reorganises his forces and confronts Warwick's army. Before the walls of Coventry, George betrays Warwick, and rejoins the Yorkists; this is lauded by Edward and Richard, and furiously condemned by the Lancastrians. The Yorkists achieve a decisive victory at the Battle of Barnet (1471), during which both Warwick and Montague are killed. Meanwhile, Edward's forces have captured Henry and sent him to the Tower of London.

Oxford and the Duke of Somerset now assume command of the Lancastrian forces, and join a second battalion newly arrived from France led by Margaret and Prince Edward. In the subsequent Battle of Tewkesbury (1471), the Yorkists rout the Lancastrians, capturing Margaret, Prince Edward, Somerset and Oxford.

Somerset is sentenced to death, Oxford to life imprisonment, Margaret is banished, and Prince Edward is stabbed to death by the three Plantagenet brothers after he refuses to recognise the House of York as the legitimate royal family.

At this point, Richard goes to London to kill Henry. At Richard's arrival at the Tower, the two argue, and in a rage Richard stabs Henry. With his dying breath, Henry prophesies Richard's future villainy and the chaos that will engulf the country.

Back at court, King Edward is reunited with his queen and meets his infant son, who was born in sanctuary. Edward orders celebrations to begin, believing the civil wars are finally over and lasting peace is at hand. He is unaware, however, of Richard's scheming and his desire for power at any cost.

== Sources ==
Shakespeare's primary source for 3 Henry VI was Edward Hall's The Union of the Two Noble and Illustre Families of Lancaster and York (1548). As with most of his chronicle histories, Shakespeare also consulted Raphael Holinshed's Chronicles of England, Scotland and Ireland (1577; 2nd edition 1587). Holinshed took much of his information on the Wars of the Roses from Hall, even to the point of reproducing large portions of text from Hall verbatim. However, there are sufficient differences between Hall and Holinshed to establish that Shakespeare consulted both.

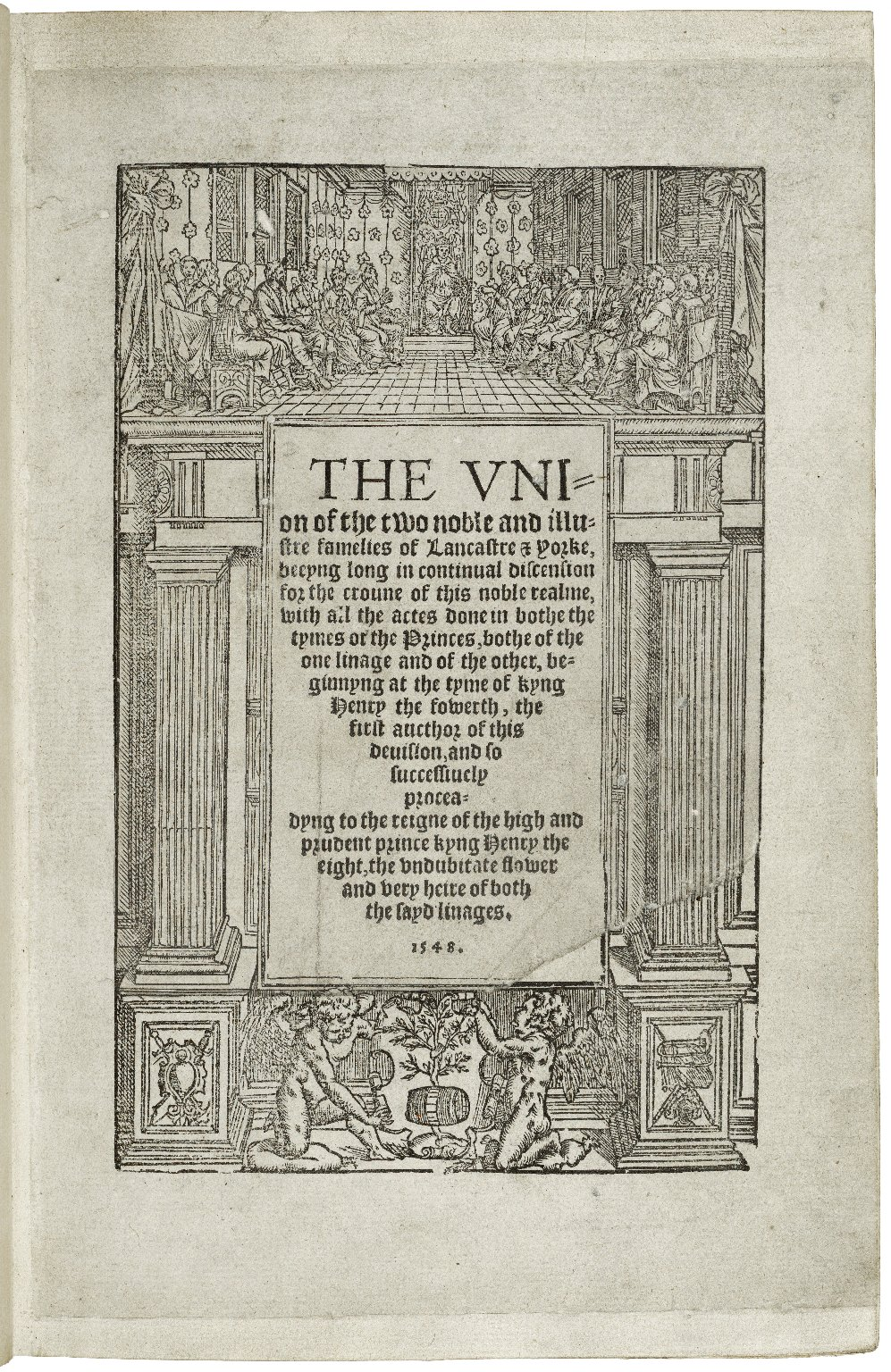
Title page from the 1550 edition of Edward Hall's The Union of the Two Noble and Illustre Families of Lancaster and York.

For example, when Henry is urged by Clifford, Northumberland and Westmorland to engage the Yorkists in combat in the parliamentary chambers, he is reluctant, arguing that the Yorkists have greater support in London than the Lancastrians; "Know you not the city favours them,/And they have troops of soldiers at their beck" (1.1.67–68). Both Hall and Holinshed report that the Yorkists invaded the parliament house, but only Hall reports that Henry chose not to engage them because the majority of the people supported York's claim to the throne. Rutland's death scene (1.3) is also based on Hall rather than Holinshed. Although Clifford is reported as having murdered Rutland in both Hall and Holinshed, only in Hall is Rutland's tutor present, and only in Hall do Rutland and Clifford engage in a debate about revenge prior to the murder. The depiction of Edward's initial meeting with Lady Grey (3.2) is also based on Hall rather than Holinshed. For example, Hall is alone in reporting that Edward seemingly offered to make her his queen merely from motives of lust; Edward "affirming farther that if she would thereunto condescend [to sleep with him], she might so fortune of his paramour and concubine to be changed to his wife and lawful bedfellow." Later, Holinshed does not mention any instance in which George and Richard express their dissatisfaction with Edward's decision (depicted in the play in 4.1), or their questioning of Edward as to why he is favouring the relations of his wife over his own brothers. Such a scene occurs only in Hall, who writes that Clarence declared to Gloucester that, "We would make him know that we were all three one man's sons, of one mother and one lineage descended, which should be more preferred and promoted than strangers of his wife's blood [...] He will exalt or promote his cousin or ally, which little careth for the fall or confusion of his own line and lineage." A more general aspect unique to Hall is the prominence of revenge as a motive for much of the cruelty in the play. Revenge is cited many times by different characters as a guiding force behind their actions; Northumberland, Westmorland, Clifford, Richard, Edward and Warwick all declare at some point in the play that they are acting out of a desire for vengeance on their enemies. Revenge, however, plays little part in Holinshed, who hardly mentions the word, and never offers it as a major theme of the war.

On the other hand, some aspects of the play are unique to Holinshed rather than Hall. For example, both Hall and Holinshed represent Margaret and Clifford taunting York after the Battle of Wakefield (depicted in 1.4), but Hall makes no mention of a crown or a molehill, both of which are alluded to in Holinshed (although in the chronicle, the crown is made of sedges, not paper); "The duke was taken alive and in derision caused to stand upon a molehill, on whose head they put a garland instead of a crown, which they had fashioned and made of sedges or bulrushes." More evidence that Shakespeare used Holinshed is found in the scene is which Warwick is in France after joining the Lancastrians (3.3), and King Louis assigns his Admiral, Lord Bourbon, to aid Warwick in assembling an army. In Holinshed, the Admiral is referred to as "Lord Bourbon", as he is in the play (and as he was in reality), whereas in Hall the Admiral is erroneously called "Lord Burgundy". Another aspect of the play found only in Holinshed is Edward's offer of peace to Warwick prior to the Battle of Barnet; "Now Warwick, wilt thou ope the city gates,/Speak gentle words and humbly bend thy knee?/Call Edward king, and at his hands beg mercy,/And he shall pardon thee these outrages" (5.1.21–24). This offer from Edward is not reported in Hall, who makes no reference to a Yorkist attempt to parley with Warwick. This incident is found only in Holinshed.

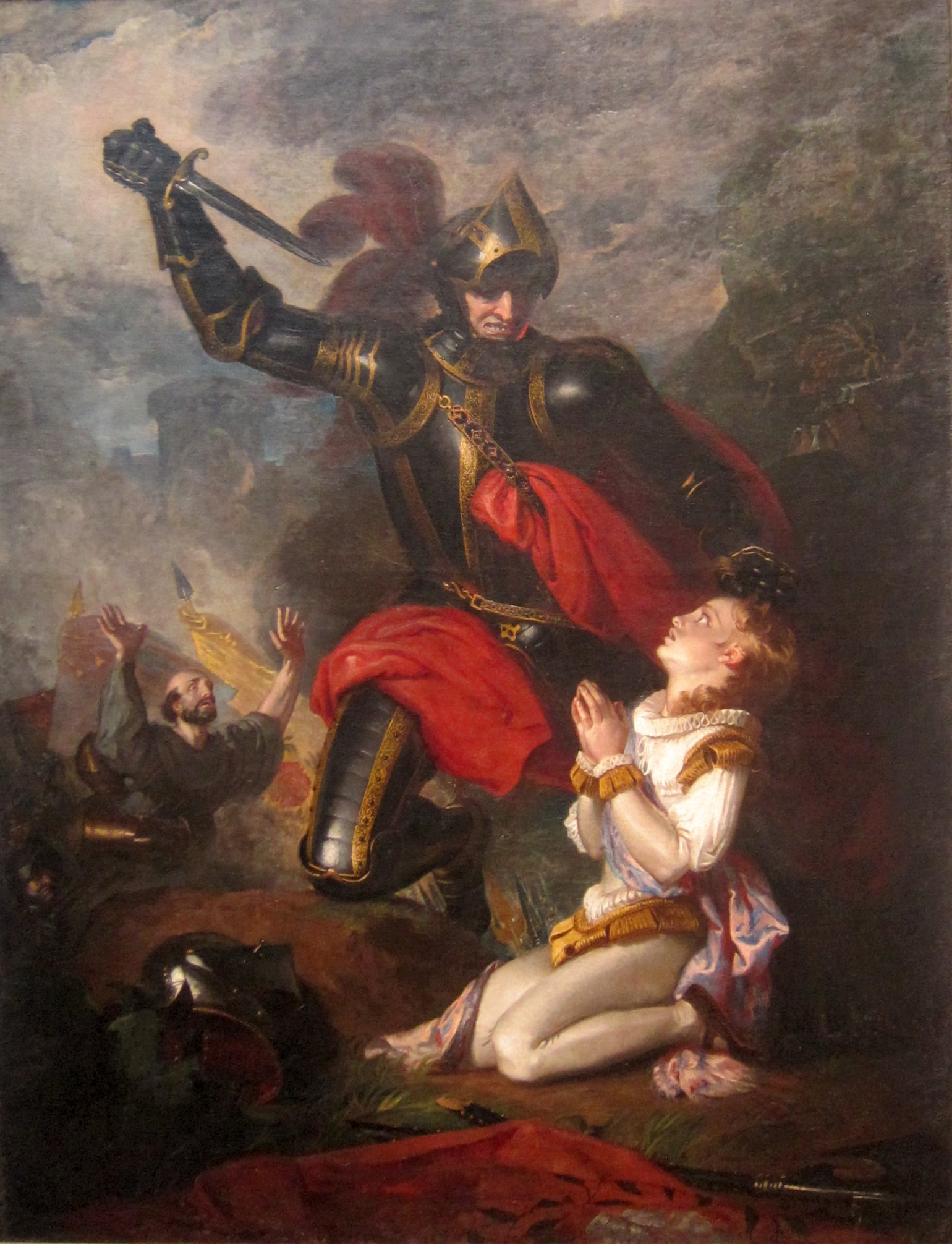
The Murder of Rutland by Lord Clifford by Charles Robert Leslie (1815). Pennsylvania Academy of the Fine Arts.

Although Shakespeare's main sources for factual material were Hall and Holinshed, he seems to have used other texts for thematic and structural purposes. One such source was almost certainly Sackville and Norton's Gorboduc (1561), a play about a deposed king who divides his land between his children, and which Shakespeare also used as a source for King Lear. Gorboduc was reprinted in 1590, the year before Shakespeare wrote 3 Henry VI, and he seems to have used it as his "model for exploring and representing the destruction of civil society by factional conflict." More specifically, Gorboduc is the only known pre-seventeenth century text containing a scene in which a son unknowingly kills his father, and a father unknowingly kills his son, and as such, almost certainly served as the source for Act 2, Scene 5, in which Henry witnesses just such an incident.

Another thematic source may have been William Baldwin's The Mirror for Magistrates (1559; 2nd edition, 1578), a well-known series of poems spoken by controversial historical figures who speak of their lives and deaths, and to warn contemporary society not to make the same mistakes they did. Three such figures are Margaret of Anjou, King Edward IV and Richard Plantagenet, 3rd Duke of York. York's final scene, and his last speech in particular (1.4.111–171), are often identified as being the 'type' of scene suitable to a traditional tragic hero who has been defeated by his own ambition, and this is very much how York presents himself in Mirror, a tragic hero whose dynastic ambitions caused him to reach too far and led to his ruin.

Thomas Kyd's The Spanish Tragedy (1582–1591) may also have served as a minor influence. Of specific importance is the handkerchief soaked in Rutland's blood which Margaret produces during York's torture in Act 1, Scene 4. This could have been influenced by the recurring image of a bloody handkerchief in the immensely popular Tragedy, insofar as a handkerchief soaked in the blood of his son, Horatio, is carried by the protagonist, Hieronimo, throughout the play.

A minor source which Shakespeare certainly used was Arthur Brooke's The Tragical History of Romeus and Juliet (1562), which was also Shakespeare's source for Romeo and Juliet. Much of Margaret's speech to her army in Act 5, Scene 4 is taken almost verbatim from Brooke. In Romeus and Juliet, Friar Laurence advises Romeus to stand up to his troubles, and be brave in the face of great danger;

A wise man in the midst of troubles and distress
Still stands not wailing present harm, but seeks his harm's redress.
As when the winter flaws with dreadful noise arise,
And heave the foamy swelling waves up to the starry skies,
So that the bruis'd barque in cruel seas betost,
Despaireth of the happy haven, in danger to be lost.
The pilot bold at helm, cries, 'Mates, strike now your sail',
And turns her stem into the waves that strongly her assail.
Then driven hard upon the bare and wreckful shore,
In greater danger to be wrecked than he had been before,
He seeth his ship full right against the rock to run,
But yet he doth what lieth in him the perilous rock to shun.
Sometimes the beaten boat, by cunning government –
The anchors lost, the cables broke, and all the tackle spent,
The rudder smitten off, and overboad the |mast –
Doth win the long desir'd port, the stormy danger past.
But if the master dread, and overpressed with woe,
Begin to wring his hands, and lets the guiding rudder go,
The ship rents on the rock or sinketh in the deep,
And eke the coward drench'd is: So, if thou still beweep
And seek not how to help the changes that do chance,
Thy cause of sorrow shall increase, thou cause of thy mischance.
(ll.1359–1380)

This is very similar to Margaret's speech in 3 Henry VI;

Great lords, wise men ne'er sit and wail their loss
But cheerly seek how to redress their harms.
What though the mast be now blown overboard,
The cable broke, the holding-anchor lost,
And half our sailors swallowed in the flood?
Yet lives our pilot still. Is't meet that he
Should leave the helm and, like a fearful lad,
With tearful eyes add water to the sea,
And give more strength to that which hath too much,
Whiles in his moan the ship splits on the rock
Which industry and courage might have saved?
Ah what a shame, ah what a fault were this.
Say Warwick was our anchor, what of that?
And Montague our topmast, what of him?
Our slaughtered friends the tackles, what of these?
Why, is not Oxford here another anchor?
And Somerset another goodly mast?
The friends of France our shrouds and tacklings?
And, though unskilful, why not Ned and I
For once allowed the skilful pilot's charge?
We will not from the helm to sit and weep,
But keep our course, though the rough wind say no,
From shelves and rocks that threaten us with wrack.
As good to chide the waves as speak them fair;
And what is Edward but a ruthless sea?
What Clarence but a quicksand of deceit?
And Richard but a ragged fatal rock –
All these the enemies to our poor barque?
Say you can swim; alas 'tis but a while.
Tread on the sand; why, there you quickly sink;
Bestride the rock; the tide will wash you off
Or else you famish – that's a threefold death.
This speak I, lords, to let you understand,
In case some one of you would fly from us,
That there's no hoped-for mercy with the brothers
More than with ruthless waves, with sands and rocks.
Why, courage then, what cannot be avoided
'Twere childish weakness to lament or fear.
(5.4.1–38)

It has also been suggested that Shakespeare may have used several mystery cycles as sources. Randall Martin, in his 2001 edition of the play for The Oxford Shakespeare notes the similarities between York's torture in Act 1, Scene 4 and the torture of Christ as depicted in The Buffeting and Scourging of Christ, Second Trial Before Pilate and Judgement of Jesus. He also suggests a debt of influence for the murder of Rutland in Act 1, Scene 3 from Slaughter of the Innocents. Emrys Jones further suggests that Shakespeare may have been influenced in York's death scene by Desiderius Erasmus' Tragicus Rex and Thomas More's Utopia (1516) and History of King Richard III (1518), from which some of Richard's soliloquy in Act 5, Scene 6 is taken, especially the references to the need to play the actor.

== Date and text ==
=== Date ===
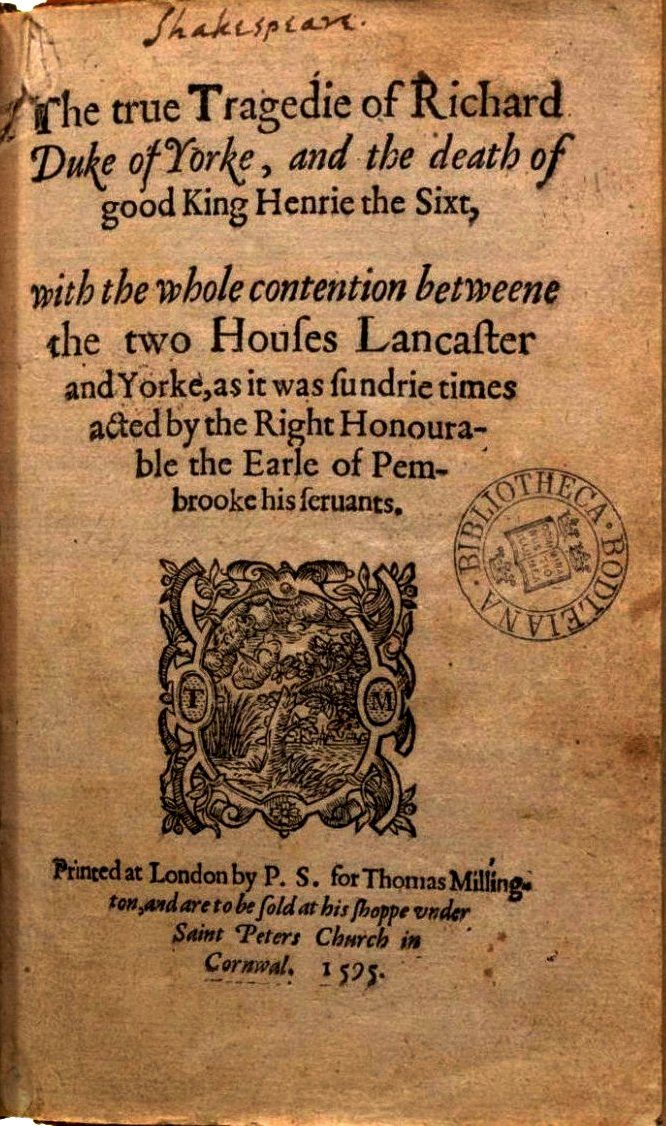
Title page of the 1595 octavo

The True Tragedie of Richard Duke of Yorke, and the death of good King Henrie the Sixt, with the Whole Contention betweene the two Houses Lancaster and Yorke (referred to hereafter as True Tragedy) was published in octavo in 1595 by the bookseller Thomas Millington and printed by Peter Short. It has been theorised that the True Tragedy is a reported text of a performance of 3 Henry VI, and if so, 3 Henry VI was written by 1595 at the latest.

There is evidence that the play may have been written several years earlier and was on stage by September 1592. Robert Greene's pamphlet A Groatsworth of Wit (registered on 20 September 1592) parodies a line from 3 Henry VI whilst mocking Shakespeare, which suggests that 3 Henry VI was well known by at least September 1592. If so, the government shut the theatres in London on the 23rd of June in reaction to an outbreak of plague, so it could not have been played in London after then, though his plays were performed in other cities such as Coventry. For the play to have been on stage by 23 June, it was likely written in early 1592 at latest.

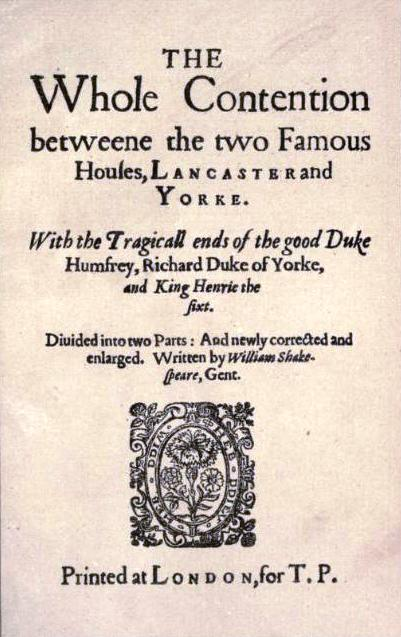
Title page of The Whole Contention (1619)

For a discussion of whether the three parts of the trilogy were composed in chronological order, see Henry VI, Part I.

=== Text ===
The 1595 octavo text of the True Tragedy was reprinted in quarto in 1600 by William White for Millington. It was reprinted in folio in 1619 as part of William Jaggard's False Folio, printed for Thomas Pavier. This text was printed together with a version of 2 Henry VI which had been printed in quarto in 1594 under the title The First part of the Contention betwixt the two famous Houses of Yorke and Lancaster, with the death of the good Duke Humphrey: And the banishment and death of the Duke of Suffolke, and the Tragicall end of the proud Cardinal of Winchester, with the notable Rebellion of Jack Cade: and the Duke of Yorke's first claim unto the Crowne(referred to hereafter as The Contention). In the False Folio the two plays were grouped under the general title The Whole Contention betweene the Two Famous Houses, Lancaster and Yorke. With the Tragicall ends of the good Duke Humfrey, Richard Duke of Yorke, and King Henrie the sixt. Also printed with The Whole Contention was Pericles, Prince of Tyre.

The text of the play known today as 3 Henry VI was not published until the 1623 First Folio, under the title The third Part of Henry the Sixt, with the death of the Duke of Yorke.

When the play came to be called Part 3 is unclear, although most critics tend to assume it was the invention of the First Folio editors, John Heminges and Henry Condell, as there are no references to the play under the title Part 3, or any derivative thereof, prior to 1623.

== Criticism ==
=== Critical history ===
Some critics argue that the Henry VI trilogy were the first ever plays to be based on recent English history, and as such, they deserve an elevated position in the canon, and a more central role in Shakespearean criticism. According to F.P. Wilson for example, "There is no certain evidence that any dramatist before the defeat of the Spanish Armada in 1588 dared to put upon the public stage a play based upon English history [...] so far as we know, Shakespeare was the first."

However, not all critics agree. For example, Michael Taylor argues that there were at least thirty-nine history plays prior to 1592, including the two-part Christopher Marlowe play Tamburlaine (1587) and Thomas Lodge's The Wounds of Civil War (1588). Paola Pugliatti, however, argues that the case may be somewhere between Wilson and Taylor's argument; "Shakespeare may not have been the first to bring English history before the audience of a public playhouse, but he was certainly the first to treat it in the manner of a mature historian rather than in the manner of a worshipper of historical, political and religious myth."

Another issue often discussed amongst critics is the quality of the play. Along with 1 Henry VI, 3 Henry VI has traditionally been seen as one of Shakespeare's weakest plays, with critics often citing the amount of violence as indicative of artistic immaturity and inability to handle chronicle sources, especially when compared to the more nuanced and far less violent second historical tetralogy. For example, critics such as E.M.W. Tillyard, Irving Ribner and A.P. Rossiter have all claimed that the play violates neoclassical precepts of drama, which dictate that violence and battle should never be shown mimetically on stage, but should always be reported diegetically in dialogue. This view was based on traditional notions of the distinction between high and low art, a distinction which was itself based partly upon Philip Sidney's An Apology for Poetry (1579). However, this rule never existed in Greek theatre, and the lack of on-stage violence was primarily due to practical contraints, and there is an extant example of on-stage death in Sophocles's Ajax.

On the other hand, however, writers like Thomas Heywood and Thomas Nashe praised battle scenes in general as oftentimes being intrinsic to the play and not simply low art. In Piers Penniless his Supplication to the Devil (1592), Nashe praised the didactic element of drama which depicted battle and martial action, arguing that such plays were a good way of teaching both history and military tactics to the masses. Nashe also argued that plays which depict glorious national causes from the past rekindle a patriotic fervour which has been lost. More recently, speaking of 1 Henry VI, Michael Goldman has argued that battle scenes are vital to the overall movement and purpose of the play; "not only to provide an exciting spectacle but to focus and clarify, to render dramatic, the entire unwieldy chronicle."

In line with this thinking, recent scholarship has tended to look at the play as being a more complete dramatic text. Looking at the play as more complex than has traditionally been allowed for, some critics now argue that the play "juxtaposes the stirring aesthetic appeal of martial action with discursive reflection on the political causes and social consequences."

==== True Tragedy as a reported text ====
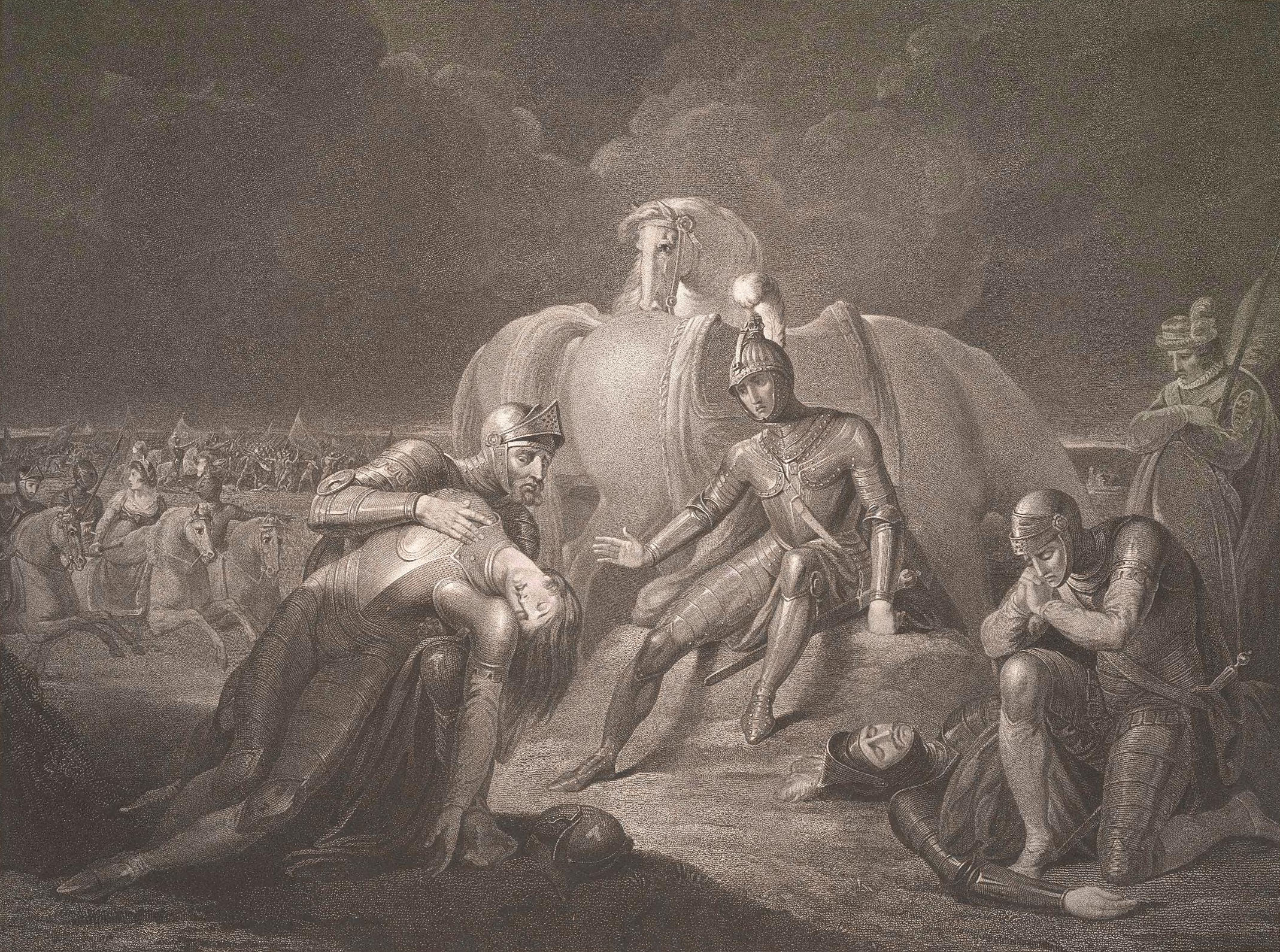
Josiah Boydell illustration of the father and son tragedy from Act 2, Scene 5, engraved by John Ogborne for the Shakspeare Gallery Pall Mall (1794)

Over the years, critics have debated the connection between True Tragedy and 3 Henry VI. Four main theories have emerged:

1. True Tragedy is a reconstructed version of a performance of Shakespeare's 3 Henry VI; a "bad octavo", an attempt by actors to reconstruct the original play from memory and sell it. The theory originated with Samuel Johnson in 1765, and was refined by Peter Alexander in 1928.
2. True Tragedy is an early draft of Shakespeare's play published in the 1623 First Folio as The third Part of Henry the Sixt. The theory originated with Edmond Malone in 1790 as an alternative to Johnson's memorial reconstruction theory, and is championed today by critics such as Steven Urkowitz.
3. True Tragedy is both a reported text and an early draft of Shakespeare's 3 Henry VI. This theory gained increasing support in the latter half of the 20th century, and is supported by several modern editors of the play.
4. Shakespeare was not the author of the True Tragedy, but made use of the anonymous play as the basis for his 3 Henry VI. The theory originated with Georg Gottfried Gervinus in 1849, and remained popular throughout the 19th century, with Thomas Lodge and George Peele the leading candidates as possible authors of the True Tragedy. The theory fell out of favour in the twentieth century.

Critical opinion originally favoured Samuel Johnson's theory of the "bad Octavo". Edmond Malone challenged Johnson's theory in 1790, suggesting that the True Tragedy could be an early draft of Shakespeare's 3 Henry VI. Malone's view was the dominant one until 1929, when Peter Alexander re-established the dominance of the bad quarto theory.

One of Alexander's main arguments hinged on the start of Act 4, Scene 1, where Richard and Clarence reproach Edward for favouring his wife's relatives over themselves. In True Tragedy, after Edward has been informed of Warwick's allegiance with the Lancastrians, he is upbraided by his brothers for his recent actions in ll.2074–2083. In this, it implies that Lord Hastings is set to marry the daughter of Lord Hungerford, and Lord Scales is set to marry the daughter of Lord Bonfield. In 3 Henry VI, however, the lines are different in 4.1.48–59, and explains that it was Lord Scales' daughter (Elizabeth de Scales) who was to marry Lady Grey's brother (Anthony Woodville, 2nd Earl of Rivers), and Lady Grey's son (Thomas Grey, 1st Marquess of Dorset) who was to marry the daughter of Lord Bonville (Cecily Bonville). Based on this inconsistency, Alexander argued that the representation of the scene in True Tragedy probably came about because the reporter became confused about who was to marry whom. Furthermore, unlike the account in True Tragedy, the version in 3 Henry VI corresponds closely to the chronicle material found in Hall.

In relation to mistakes like this, it has been argued that "no one who understood what he was writing, that is – no author – could have made such error[s], but someone parroting someone else's work of which he himself had but a dim understanding – that is, a reporter – could have."

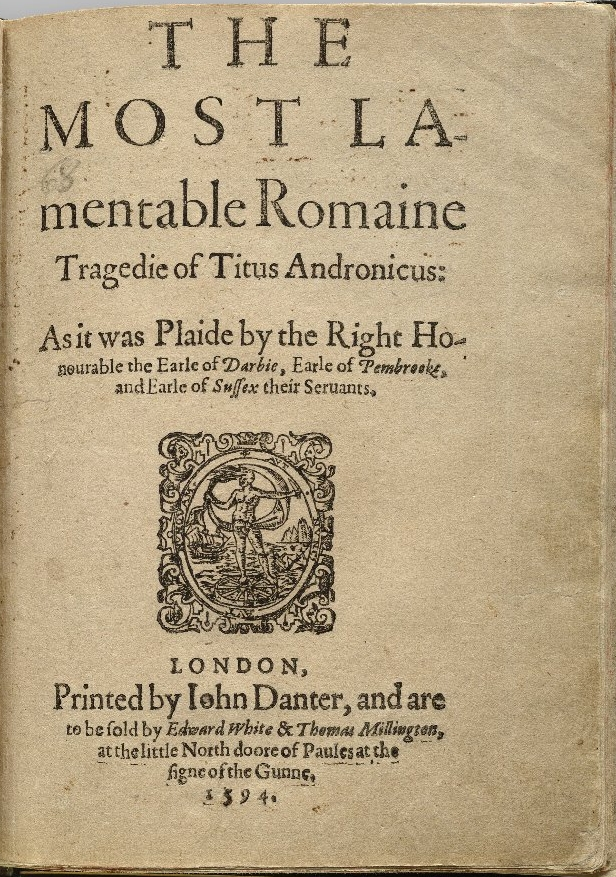
Title page of the 1594 quarto of The Most Lamentable Romaine Tragedie of Titus Andronicus

However, even more telling than the difference between the details of the proposed marriages is the contrast between the two names; Bonfield in True Tragedy and Bonville in 3 Henry VI. Bonfield is never mentioned in the chronicles; Bonville on the other hand is mentioned numerous times. However, there is a minor character named Bonfield in the Robert Greene play George a Greene, the Pinner of Wakefield (1587–1590), where he is a member of a group of staunch opponents of Edward III. George a Greene was published in quarto in 1599, and the title page states that it was performed by Sussex's Men, who also performed Titus Andromachus. Pembroke's Men performed both True Tragedy and Titus Andronicus, whereas Sussex's Men performed both George a Greene and Titus Andronicus, creating a link between True Tragedy and George a Greene. Therefore, perhaps either Sussex's Men could have performed True Tragedy or Pembroke's Men could have performed George a Greene, or both. Taken together, the name of Bonfield "in two historically unrelated texts performed by companies that shared scripts and personnel indicates that the name is a non-authorial interpolation by players." That this could be the case is further supported by the fact that reported texts often use material from other plays. For example, The Contention uses material from Christopher Marlowe's The Tragical History of Doctor Faustus (c. 1592), Edward II (c. 1593) and even a line from 3 Henry VI; "If our King Henry had shook hands with death" (1.4.103).

More evidence of reporting is found in Act 2 Scene 5, where it could be argued that in True Tragedy, the reporter was thinking ahead, anticipating the arrival of the others and anachronistically having a character aware of their inevitable arrival. As with the omission of important information, this foreknowledge of events is the type of mistake which characterises the bad quartos.

==== True Tragedy as early draft ====
Steven Urkowitz has spoken at great length about the debate between the bad quarto theory and the early draft theory, coming down firmly on the side of the early draft. Urkowitz argues that the quarto of 2 Henry VI and the octavo of 3 Henry VI actually present scholars with a unique opportunity to see a play evolving, as Shakespeare edited and rewrote certain sections. Urkowitz argues that the Bonfield/Bonville variant in True Tragedy/3 Henry VI "is dramatically defensible because it still supports Clarence's complaint against Edward and motivates his ensuing defection to the Lancastrians. This change therefore, gets across the intent of the chronicle history." Urkowitz argues that "such fine-tuning of dramatic themes and actions are staples of professional theatrical writing."

Another argument of the early draft theory is how True Tragedy and 3 Henry VI use Holinshed and Hall. While in True Tragedy, Shakespeare uses Hall more than Holinshed, in 3 Henry VI the use of Hall and Holinshed is roughly equal. The argument is that this difference cannot be accounted for by faulty reporting, and instead must represent revision on Shakespeare's part.

An example of this can be found when Clarence returns to the Yorkist forces in Act 5, Scene 1. In True Tragedy, his turn is anticipated in ll.2762–2768. In this version of the scene, Richard is shown as primarily responsible for turning Clarence back to the Yorkist side; whatever he says during their parley convinces Clarence to rejoin his brothers. This is how the incident is represented in Hall. In 3 Henry VI however, the scene plays out differently in 5.1.76–82. This version of the scene corresponds to Holinshed, where Richard plays no part in Clarence's decision. The argument here is that the difference in 3 Henry VI could not simply be the result of faulty reporting, or even interpolation on the part of a reporter, but must represent authorial agency, hence, True Tragedy must represent an earlier draft of 3 Henry VI.

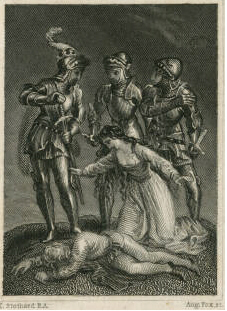
Thomas Stothard illustration of the death of Prince Edward; engraved by Augustus Fox (1824)

However, the theory that True Tragedy may be an early draft does not necessarily imply that it could not also represent a bad quarto as well: recently there has been some argument that it may be both. For example, this is the theory supported by Randall Martin in his Oxford Shakespeare edition of the play. It is also the theory advanced by Roger Warren in his Oxford Shakespeare edition of 2 Henry VI. The crux of the argument is that the evidence for each is so compelling that neither is able to completely refute the other, therefore, perhaps True Tragedy represents a reported text of an early draft of 3 Henry VI. Martin argues that this is the only theory which can account for the strong evidence for both reporting and revision.

==== Differences between True Tragedy and 3 Henry VI ====
If it is accepted that Shakespeare made a conscious decision to use Holinshed more frequently during his re-editing of True Tragedy, one may ask why. True Tragedy is roughly one thousand lines shorter than 3 Henry VI, and whilst many of the differences are simple aesthetic changes and alternate phraseology, one major difference between the two that runs throughout is how they each handle violence. On the whole, 3 Henry VI is far more restrained in its depiction of war, whereas True Tragedy has more explicit and sustained on-stage combat and more royal processions and celebrations after combat. Much more so than 3 Henry VI, True Tragedy conforms to the so-called Tudor myth that the Wars of Roses were God's punishment for people straying from the path laid out for them, and His means of purging the country of evil and opening the way for the righteous Tudor dynasty to establish peace. Traditionally, this has been a common way of interpreting the entire octalogy; advocated and elaborated upon by critics as diverse as August Wilhelm Schlegel, Hermann Ulrici, Georg Gottfried Gervinus, Irving Ribner, M.M. Reese, Robert Rentoul Reed, and, most famously, E.M.W. Tillyard, with whom the phrase Tudor myth is now most associated.

Some critics, however, such as Henry Ansgar Kelly, A.P. Rossiter, A.L. French, David Frey, J.P. Brockbank, David Riggs, Michael Hattaway, Michael Taylor, Randall Martin and Ronald Knowles, argue that this is the main reason Shakespeare chose to use Holinshed rather than Hall, as Holinshed's attitude to violence was less celebratory than Hall's, his patriotic fervour less pronounced, and his attitude to carnage more ambiguous. As Paola Pugliatti puts it, "Source manipulation and sheer invention may be read as a distinctly critical gesture, in that they show the need to question the official historiographical tradition."

Examples of the difference in depictions of violence between True Tragedy and 3 Henry VI include Act 2, Scene 6; in True Tragedy, the stage direction dictates that Clifford enter "with an arrow in his neck", whereas in 3 Henry VI, he simply enters "wounded." In Act 4, Scene 3, when Warwick surprises Edward in his tent, in 3 Henry VI, Richard and Hastings simply flee, but in True Tragedy, there is a short battle. Similarly, in True Tragedy, Act 5, Scene 5 begins with a much more grandiose opening than 3 Henry VI does.

Taking all of these differences into account, the argument is that "Shakespeare reconceived the action, toning down the sound and fury, and thereby altering the overall effect and meaning of 3 Henry VI as a play whose attitude to war is more rueful."

==== Montague problem ====
Another aspect of the play which has provoked critical disagreement is the character of Montague. He is introduced in Act 1, Scene 1 as a Yorkist supporter who fought at the Battle of St Albans (dramatised at the end of 2 Henry VI), and he accompanies the Yorkist group from the battlefield to London in pursuit of Henry, Margaret and Clifford. In Act 1, Scene 2, upon realising that Margaret is set to attack, York sends Montague to London to get Warwick. Montague duly leaves, and when Warwick returns in Act 2, Scene 1, he is accompanied by a character called Montague, but who he introduces as an apparently new character.

As such, the character of Montague seems to represent two separate historical personages in the play, and whilst this is not unusual in Shakespearean histories, the manner of the dual representation is. Montague seems to represent two different people at different times in the play; i.e. the character himself changes identities during the play. Initially he seems to represent Salisbury, Warwick's father (Richard Neville, 5th Earl of Salisbury – a major character in 2 Henry VI) and subsequently, he seems to represent Salisbury's son and Warwick's brother, John Neville (1st Marquis of Montague – a new character).

In 3 Henry VI, at 1.1.14, 1.1.117–118 and 1.2.60, Montague refers to York as his 'brother'. Similarly, at 1.2.4, 1.2.36 and 1.2.55, York refers to Montague as his 'brother'. If Montague here represents Salisbury, their reference to one another as 'brother' makes sense, as Salisbury was York's brother-in-law (York was married to Salisbury's sister, Cecily Neville). However, if Montague here represents John Neville, his and York's references to one another as 'brother' are inaccurate. Subsequently, at 2.1.168, Warwick refers to Montague as brother, and he is also called Marquis for the first time, neither descriptions of which could be applied to Salisbury or to any character who describes himself as a brother to York. As such, in 1.1 and 1.2, Montague seems to be York's brother-in-law, and Warwick's father, Richard Neville (i.e. Salisbury), but from that point forward, after his re-introduction in Act 2, he seems to represent Salisbury's son and Warwick's younger brother, John Neville.

In True Tragedy (which treats the character of Montague as one consistent persona throughout the play), Salisbury's death is reported by Richard in ll.1075–1085. In the corresponding scene in 3 Henry VI (2.3.14–23) however, Richard reports the death of another of Warwick's brothers, Thomas Neville, who never features as a character in any of the Henry VI plays.

It is generally agreed amongst critics that the differences between these two passages represents authorial revision as opposed to faulty reporting, leading one to ask the question of why Shakespeare removed the references to Salisbury, and why he wrote the preceding lines where Warwick re-introduces Montague as his brother.

Obviously, such a character discrepancy can create a problem for productions of the play. As an example of one way in which productions can resolve the problem, in Act 1, Scene 1 of the 1981 BBC Shakespeare adaptation, Montague is not present in either the persona of Salisbury or that of John Neville. As such, his first two lines, are reassigned to Clarence and altered. Montague's second line is entirely absent. Then, Montague is introduced in Act 1, Scene 2, played by Michael Byrne (as he is for the rest of the production). In this adaptation, the character is presented as one figure throughout – that of John Neville, Warwick's brother, Salisbury's son and York's cousin, and any lines which seemingly contradict that have been changed accordingly, e.g. the report of the death of Warwick and Montague's brother Thomas Neville in Act 2, Scene 3 uses the text from 3 Henry VI reporting the death of Neville, but it is altered so as the report becomes about Salisbury.

== Language ==
Language has an extremely important role throughout the play, especially in terms of repetition. Several motifs, words and allusions occur time and again, serving to contrast characters and situations, and to foreground certain important themes.

=== The Crown and Throne ===
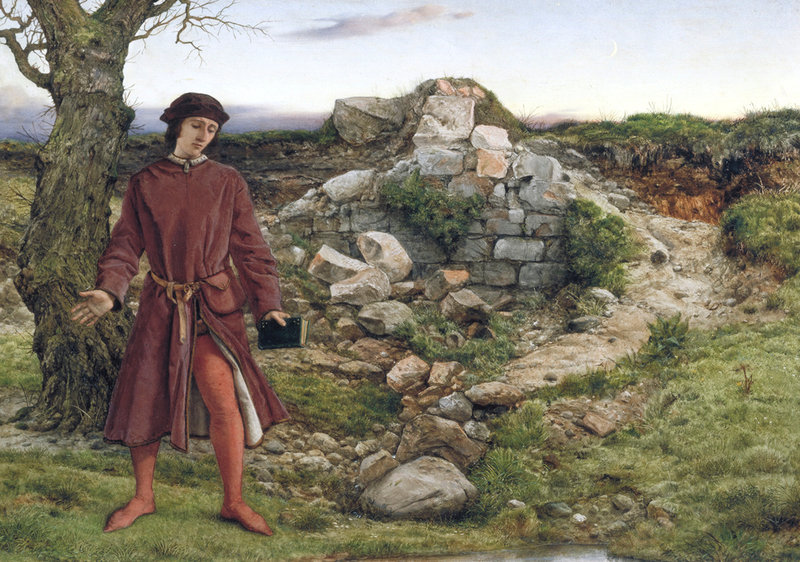
Henry VI at Towton by William Dyce (1860)

Perhaps the most obvious recurring linguistic motif in the play is that of state power as specifically represented by the crown and the throne. Both words occur multiple times throughout the play. For example, in Act 1, Scene 1 (which is set in parliament, with York spending most of the scene sitting on the throne), Warwick introduces the imagery, saying to York "Before I see thee seated in that throne,/Which now the House of Lancaster usurps,/I vow by heaven these eyes shall never close" (ll.22–24). He then introduces the word "crown"; "Resolve thee Richard, claim the English crown" (l.49). Immediately after York sits in the throne, Henry enters, exclaiming, "My lords, look where the sturdy rebel sits,/Even in the chair of state. Belike he means,/Backed by the power of Warwick, that false peer,/To aspire unto the crown and reign as king" (ll.50–54).They continue to have a debate about these topics, then as the debate reaches an impasse, Richard urges York, "Father, tear the crown from the usurper's head" (l.115). Henry refuses to yield however, declaring "Think'st thou that I will leave my kingly throne?" (l.125). Subsequently, during the debate about the conflict between Henry Bolingbrook and Richard II, York asks Exeter if Richard's abdication "was prejudicial to his crown?" (l.145) to which Exeter responds "No, for he could not so resign his crown" (l.146). York then demands that Henry "Confirm the crown to me and to mine heirs" (l.173), to which Henry reluctantly agrees to give over the crown.

Although not all subsequent scenes are as heavily saturated with references to monarchical power as is the opening scene, the imagery does recur throughout the play. Other notable examples include Richard's "How sweet a thing it is to wear a crown,/Within whose circuit is Elysium/And all that poets feign of bliss and joy" (1.2.29–31) and Edward's battle cry, "A crown or else a glorious tomb,/A sceptre, or an earthly sepulchre" (1.4.16).

Also significant is the torture of York in Act 1, Scene 4, where he is forced to wear a paper crown, whilst Margaret alludes to both the real crown and the throne numerous times (ll.96–108).

Later, York takes off the crown and throws it at Margaret, exclaiming "There, take the crown, and with the crown my curse" (l.164).

Another example of language foregrounding authority by references to the crown and throne is found in Act 2, Scene 1, as Edward laments the death of his father. Warwick says something similar later in the scene.

After decapitating York, Margaret points out the head to Henry, saying it is encumbered by his crown. Later, Edward asks Henry to kneel and put his crown upon his head. Edward then says to Margaret, "You that are king, though he do wear the crown" (2.2.90). Later, in Act 2, Scene 6, when Edward is blaming Margaret for the civil war, he says to Henry that if she hadn't provoked the House of York "thou this day hadst kept thy chair in peace" (l.19). He then says to Warwick, "For in thy shoulder do I build my seat" (l.99).

In Act 3, Scene 1, Henry debates with the gamekeepers the importance of the crown to the role of kingship.

During his lengthy soliloquy in Act 3, Scene 2, Richard also mentions the crown numerous times.

In Act 3, Scene 3, after Warwick has joined the Lancastrians, he vows to Margaret that he will uncrown and deseat him. He also muses to himself about bringing him up to the crown and now down.

In Act 4, Scene 6, after Warwick has successfully deposed Edward, Henry says to him, "Warwick, although my head still wear the crown,/I here resign my government to thee" (l.24). Finally, upon meeting Richmond (the future Henry VII), Henry proclaims, "His head by nature framed to wear a crown,/His hand to wield a sceptre, and himself/Likely in time to bless a regal throne" (ll.72–74).

=== Animal Imagery ===
Another recurring motif is animal imagery. The use of animal imagery intensifies the depiction of war and politics, as humans are figured as non-human, and fights are akin to that of predator and prey.

Bird imagery is particularly prevalent. The first example is in Act 1, Scene 1, when Warwick says "[No-one] dares stir a wing if Warwick shake his bells" (l.47), a reference to falconry. Again in the opening scene, Henry claims that York will, "like an empty eagle/Tire on the flesh of me and my son" (ll.269–270).

Later, as York describes his failed attempts to win the recently concluded battle, he muses to himself, "We botched again, as I have often seen a swan/With bootless labour swim against the tide" (1.4.19–20). Subsequently, as Clifford tells York he will soon die, York declares "My ashes, as the Phoenix', may bring forth/A bird that will revenge upon you all" (1.4.35–36), to which Clifford replies "So cowards fight when they can fly no further,/So doves peck the falcon's piercing talons" (1.4.40–41).

After the news of York's death has reached them, Richard encourages Edward to take York's place; "If thou be that princely eagle's bird" (2.1.91). Later, Warwick points out that Henry has been compelled to rescind his oath to yield the throne to the House of York; "Clifford and the Lord Northumberland/And of their feather many more proud birds,/Have wrought the easy-melting King like wax" (2.1.169–171). When Clifford is urging Henry to protect the Prince's birthright, he attempts to illustrate to Henry that doing the right thing for his children should be a natural course of action; "Doves will peck in safeguard of their brood" (2.2.18). During the debate about the rightful king, Edward refers to Clifford as "that fatal screech owl/That nothing sung but death to us and ours" (2.6.55–56).

Bird imagery continues to be used contemptuously in France, where Margaret says of Edward and Warwick, "both of you are birds of selfsame feather" (3.3.161). Prior to the Battle of Barnet, as Somerset attempts to rally the troops, he says "And he that will not fight for such a hope,/Go home to bed, and like the owl by day,/If he arise, be mocked and wondered at" (5.4.55–57).

When Richard visits Henry in the tower, Henry defends his suspicion of Richard's intentions; "The bird that hath been lim'd in a bush,/With trembling wings misdoubteth every bush" (5.6.13–14). Birds also play an important part in Henry's prophecy of Richard's future evil reign, as he points out the many ill omens accompanying Richard's birth; "The owl shrieked at thy birth, an evil sign,/The night-crow cried, aboding luckless time,/Dogs howled and hideous tempest shook down trees,/The raven rooked her on the chimney's top,/And chatt'ring pies in dismal discords sung" (5.6.44–48).

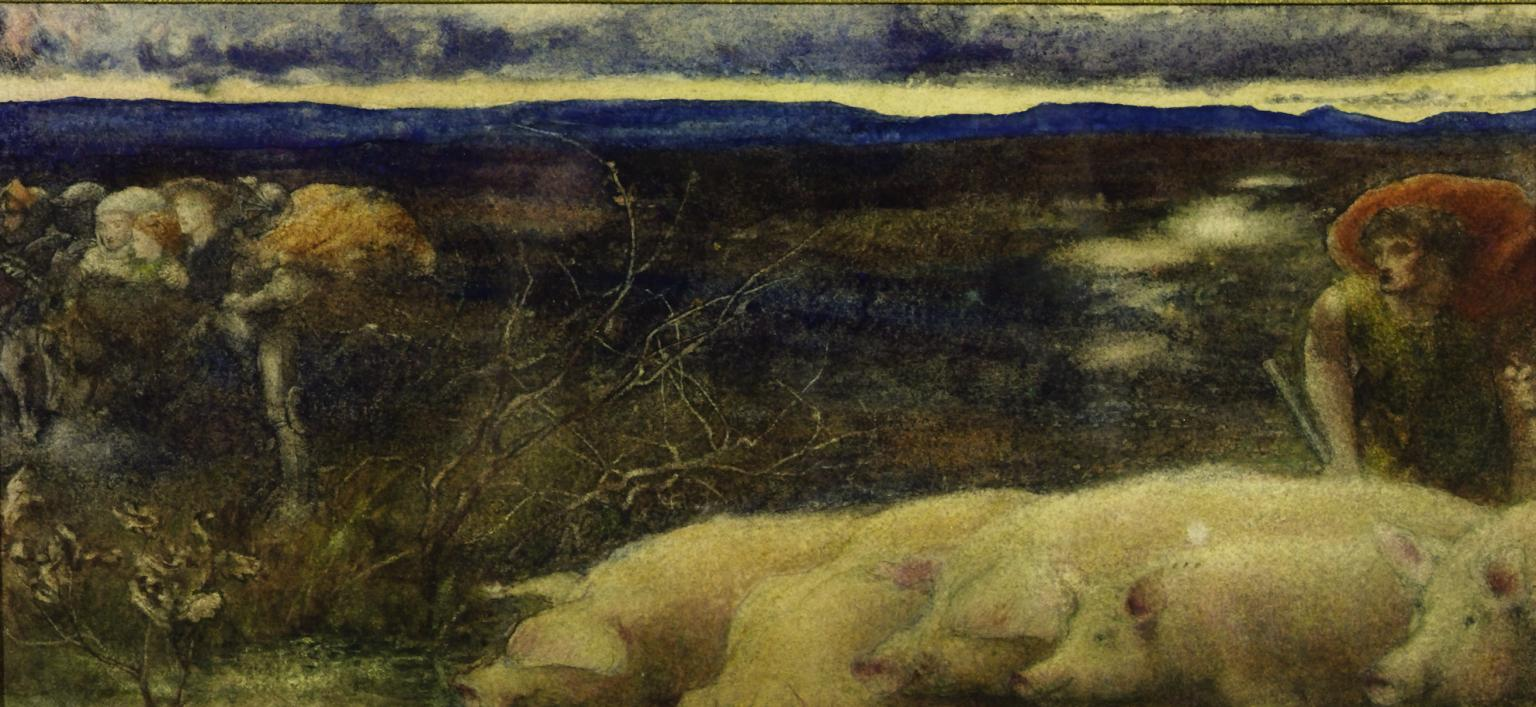
The Flight of Henry VI from Towton by William Lindsay Windus (1860)

Another commonly recurring animal motif is that of lambs and wolves. This is introduced in the opening scene when Margaret chastises Henry for yielding to York's demands and relinquishing the throne to the House of York; "Such safety finds/The trembling lamb environ'd with wolves" (ll.243–244). Later, as York watches his army lose the Battle of Wakefield, he laments "All my followers to the eager foe/Turn back and fly, like ships before the wind/Or lambs pursued by hunger-starv'd wolves" (1.4.3–5). After being captured by the Lancastrians, York then refer to Margaret as "She-wolf of France, but worse than wolves of France" (1.4.111). During the Battle of Tewkesbury, as Richard and Clifford fight, they are interrupted by Warwick, and Clifford flees. Warwick attempts to pursue him, but Richard says, "Nay Warwick, single out some other chase,/For myself will hunt this wolf to death" (2.4.13). Prior to the battle of Barnet, Margaret rallies her troops by claiming Edward has destroyed the country and usurped the throne, then pointing out "And yonder is the wolf that makes this spoil" (5.4.80). Finally, upon being left alone with Richard in the Tower, Henry proclaims "So flies the reckless shepherd from the wolf,/So first the harmless sheep doth yield his fleece,/And next his throat, unto the butcher's knife" (5.6.7–9).

A third recurring image is that of the lion. This is introduced by Rutland in Act 1, Scene 3; "So looks the pent-up lion o'er the wretch" (l.174). Later, Richard, speaking of York, says "Methought he bore him in the thickest troop/As doth a lion in a herd of neat" (2.1.13–14). As Clifford chastises Henry for disinheriting Prince Edward, he asks "To whom do lions cast their gentle looks?/Not to the beast that would usurp the den" (2.2.11–12). Lions are then mentioned in conjunction with lambs during the Battle of Tewkesbury; "While lions roar and battle for their dens/Poor harmless lambs abide their enmity" (2.5.74–75). Lions and lambs are again combined when, just before his second capture, Henry is wondering why the people prefer Edward to him; "And when the lion fawns upon the lamb,/The lamb will never cease to follow him" (4.8.49–50). Warwick later combines lions and birds during his death speech, "I must yield my body to the earth/And by my fall, the conquest to my foe./Thus yields the cedar to the axe's edge,/Whose arms gave shelter to the princely eagle,/Under whose shade the ramping lion slept" (5.2.9–13).

The lion image in II. ii. 9–18 starts off as a noble lion and transforms into a maternal bear, then into the evil serpent, displaying the idea of change through animal imagery.

Other animals referred to in the play include dogs (1.4.56, 2.1.15 and 2.5.129), woodcocks (1.4.61), rabbits (1.4.62), snakes (1.4.112 and 2.2.15), tigers (1.4.138, 1.4.155 and 3.1.39), cattle (2.1.14), bears (2.1.15, 2.2.13 and 3.2.161), toads (2.2.138), bulls (2.5.126), hares (2.5.131), chameleons (3.2.191) and foxes (4.7.25).

== Themes ==
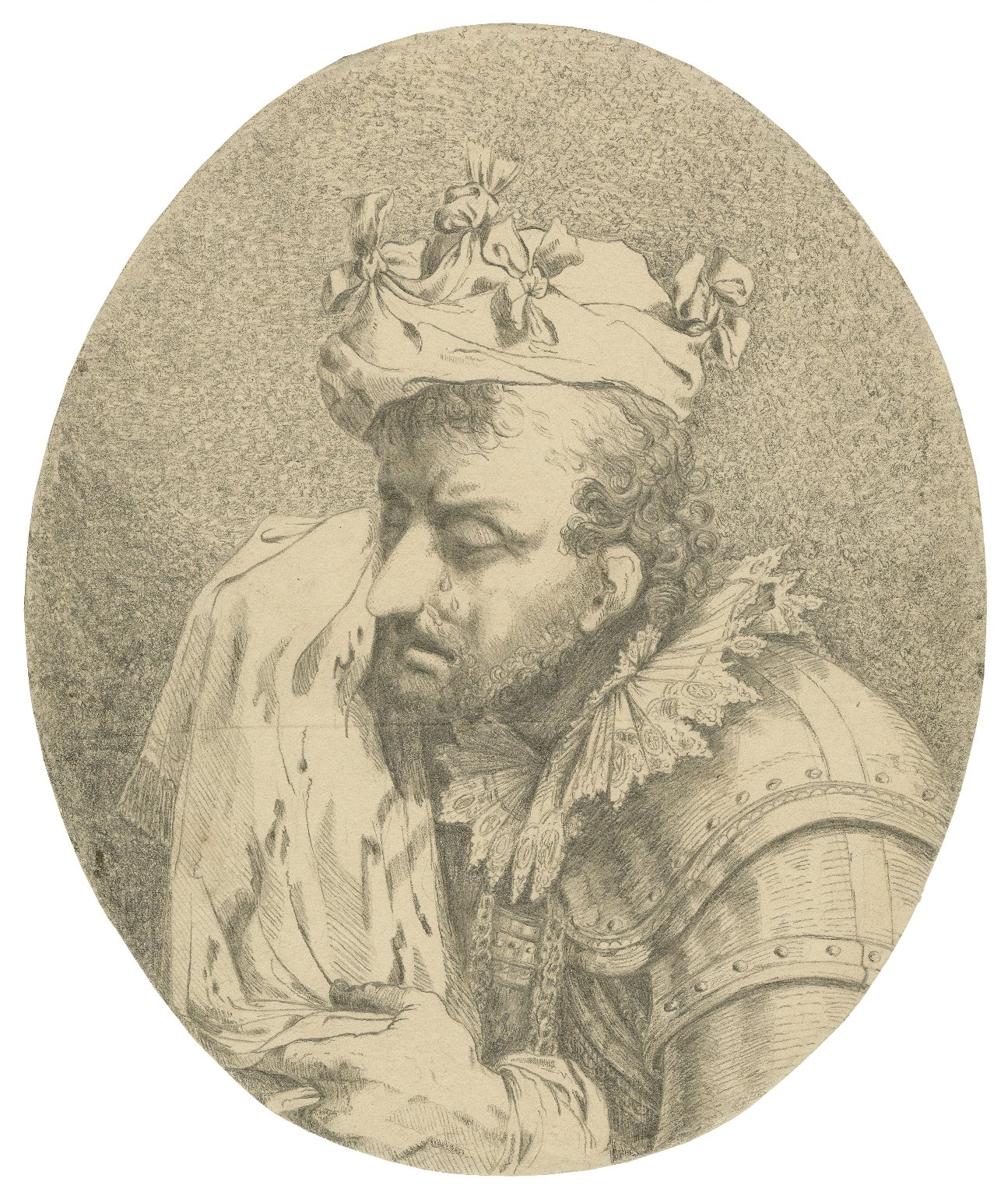
Drawing by John Hamilton Mortimer from Act 1, Scene 4 (The Duke of York wipes away his tears with a handkerchief soaked in Rutland's blood).

=== Revenge ===
One of the most obvious themes in the play is revenge, which is cited numerous times by various different characters as the driving force for their actions. At different points in the play, Henry, Northumberland, Westmorland, Clifford, Richard, Edward and Warwick all cite a desire for revenge as a major factor in guiding their decisions, and revenge becomes a shared objective between both sides of the conflict, as each seek to redress the apparent wrongs perpetrated by the other; "In 3 Henry VI, we witness the final degradation of chivalry: this play contains some of the most horrific scenes in the canon as England's warlords sacrifice honour to a remorseless ethic of revenge."

The theme of revenge is introduced in the opening scene. Upon seeing York seated on the royal throne, Henry reminds his allies of their conflict with the Yorkists in an attempt to motivate them; "Earl of Northumberland, [York] slew thy father,/And thine Lord Clifford, and you both have vowed revenge/On him, his sons, his favourites and his friends" (1.1.54–56). Northumberland responds to this with "If I be not, heavens be revenged on me" (1.1.57). Later, after Henry has resigned the crown to the House of York and has been abandoned by Clifford, Westmorland and Northumberland, Exeter explains, "They seek revenge and therefore shall not yield" (1.1.191). Later, after Edward has been installed as king, Oxford refuses to acknowledge him, arguing "Call him my king, by whose injurious doom/My elder brother the Lord Aubrey Vere/Was done to death? And more than so, my father" (3.3.101-102).

Revenge, however, is not confined to the Lancastrians. Upon learning of the death of his father, Richard is almost overwhelmed with a manic thirst for vengeance (2.1.79–88).

Similarly, upon hearing of the death of his brother, Warwick vows revenge. (2.3.29–32). During his time in France, Warwick again cites revenge as part of his reason for joining the Lancastrians; "Did I let pass th'abuse done to my niece?" (3.3.188 – this is a reference to an incident reported in both Hall and Holinshed where Edward attempted to rape either Warwick's daughter or his niece). Only a few lines later, Warwick then exclaims, "I will revenge [Edward's] wrong to Lady Bona" (3.3.197). He also acknowledges that revenge is his primary motive in joining the Lancastrians, not devotion to their cause; "I'll be the chief to bring [Edward] down again,/Not that I pity Henry's misery,/But seek revenge on Edward's mockery" (3.3.264–266). It is perhaps Warwick who sums up the revenge ethic of the play; in Act 2, Scene 6, upon finding Clifford's body, Warwick orders that Clifford's head replace York's at the gates of the city, declaring "Measure for measure must be answer'd" (l.54).

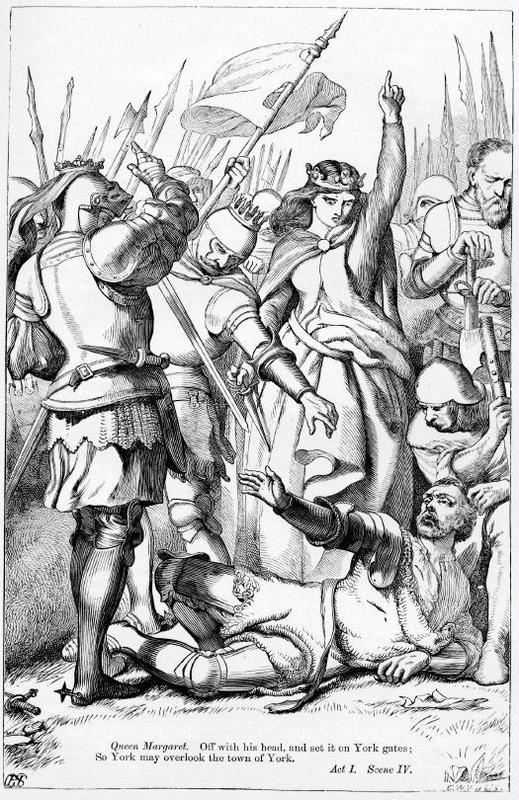
H.C. Selous' illustration of the death of York in Act 1, Scene 4; from The Plays of William Shakespeare: The Historical Plays, edited by Charles Cowden Clarke and Mary Cowden Clarke (1830)

Of all the characters who advocate revenge however, Clifford is by far the most passionate. His obsession with revenge for the death of his father takes root before the play even begins, in the penultimate scene of 2 Henry VI (5.2.45–60)

Early in 3 Henry VI, Clifford makes it clear that nothing has changed in his desire to revenge his father's death. When Warwick mentions his father, Clifford responds "Urge it no more, lest that instead of words,/I send thee, Warwick, such a messenger/As shall revenge his death before I stir" (1.1.99–101). Later, refusing to bow to York, Clifford exclaims "May that ground gape and swallow me alive/Where I shall kneel to him that slew my father" (1.1.162–163). The murder of Rutland is particularly important in terms of Clifford's pursuit of vengeance, as the scene is punctuated with a debate about the limits and moral implications of exacting revenge on someone who did no wrong in the first place:

RUTLAND
Sweet Clifford, hear me speak before I die:
I am too mean a subject for thy wrath;
Be thou revenged on men, and let me live.

CLIFFORD
In vain thou speak'st, poor boy: my father's blood
Hath stopped the passage where thy words should enter.

RUTLAND
Then let my father's blood open it again:
He is a man, and Clifford cope with him.

CLIFFORD
Had I thy brethren here, their lives and thine
Were not revenge sufficient for me:
No, if I digged up thy forefathers' graves
And hung their rotten coffins up in chains,
It could not slake mine ire, nor ease my heart.
The sight of any of the House of York
Is as a fury to torment my soul,
And till I root out their accurs'd line
And leave not one alive, I live in hell.
Therefore –

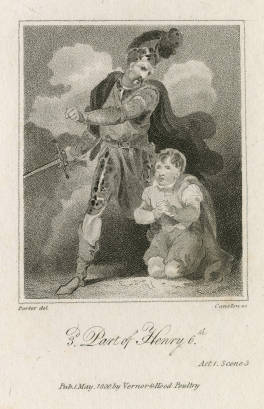
Robert Ker Porter illustration of the murder of Rutland in Act 1, Scene 3; engraved by 'Cranston' (1800)

He lifts his hand.

RUTLAND
O let me pray, before I take my death!
To thee I pray; sweet Clifford pity me.

CLIFFORD
Such pity as my rapier's point affords.

RUTLAND
I never did thee harm, why wilt thou slay me?

CLIFFORD
Thy Father hath.

RUTLAND
But 'twas ere I was born.
Thou hast one son: for his sake pity me,
Least in revenge thereof, sith God is just,
He be as miserably slain as I.
Ah, let me live in prison all my days,
And when I give occasion of offence,
Then let me die, for now thou hast no cause.

CLIFFORD
No cause? thy Father slew my Father: therefore die.

He stabs him.

RUTLAND
Dii faciant laudis summa sit ista tuæ.

CLIFFORD
Plantagenet, I come Plantagenet,
And this thy son's blood cleaving to my blade
Shall rust upon my weapon, till thy blood
Congealed with this, do make me wipe off both.

(1.3.19–52)

Clifford subverts all notions of morality and chivalry in his dogged pursuit of revenge, determined to visit onto the House of York the same type of suffering as it delivered onto him with the death of his father. This culminates during the torture of York in Act 1, Scene 4. Only moments after capturing York, Clifford wants to execute him immediately, but is prevented from doing so by Margaret, who wishes to talk to, and taunt, York prior to killing him. When Margaret tells York that he will die soon, Clifford quickly points out, "That is my office, for my father's sake" (l.109). Clifford remains relatively silent throughout most of the scene, speaking only immediately prior to his stabbing of York, and again, citing revenge as foremost in his mind; "Here's for my oath, here's for my father's death" (l.175).

However, even with the death of his father's killer, Clifford seems to remain obsessed with revenge. During his single combat with Richard at the Battle of Towton, Clifford attempts to evoke a desire for revenge in Richard by pointing out how he killed two members of Richard's family (2.4.5–11).

Even at the point of his own death, Clifford cannot let go of revenge, transferring his own obsession onto his enemies, and assuming that in his death, they will have a measure of the revenge he so yearns for; "Come York and Richard, Warwick and the rest,/I stabbed your father's bosom, split my breast" (2.6.28–29).

=== Corrupting power and the loss of virtue ===
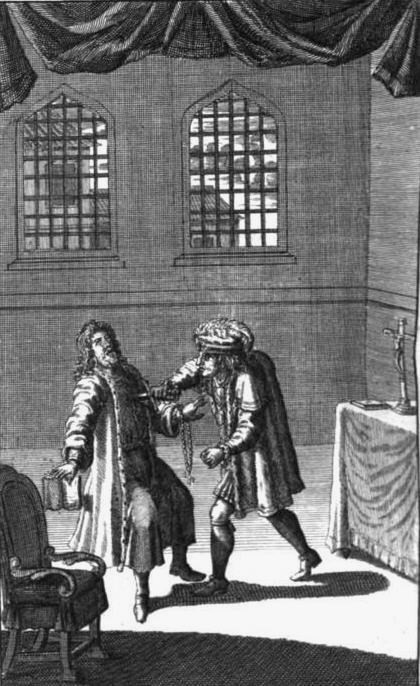
Illustration of the death of Henry in Act 5, Scene 6; from The Works of Mr. William Shakespeare, edited by Nicholas Rowe (1709)

Despite the prevalence of revenge in the earlier parts of the play, it loses significance as a motivating factor as the nature of the conflict changes and develops into a pursuit of power, without recourse to past antagonisms. Revenge ceases to be the primary driving force for many of the characters, with lust for power taking over, and past conflicts rendered unimportant as each side desperately races for victory; "the revenge ethic has been outstripped by expedient violence with no aim other than the seizure of power."

For example, when Edward and Richard are urging York to break his oath to Henry, Edward says, "But for a kingdom, any oath may be broken;/I would break a thousand oaths to reign one year" (1.2.16–17), thus showing the attraction that power has for the characters, and what they would be willing to do to attain it. Later, echoing Warwick's statement about his reasons for joining the Lancastrians, Richard outlines why he has remained loyal to the Yorkists; "I stay not for the love of Edward but the crown" (4.1.125), again showing the attraction of power and the subversion of all other concerns, including familial relations.

Another example is when Prince Edward is killed in Act 5, Scene 5. His death is brought about because he taunts the Plantagenet brothers, and they lose their temper with him, not because they are exacting revenge for an ongoing feud with his family. Similarly, when Richard kills Henry, his motives have nothing to do with the conflict between his family and Henry's. He murders him simply because Henry stands in the way of his attempts to gain the throne. As Michael Hattaway writes, "family loyalties may have been the initial cause of the feuds, but an audience watching 3 Henry VI is likely to feel that individual ambition rather than family honour is what fuels the vendettas that inform the play. Both [families] seem to have forgotten that the quarrel between [them] originally was a dynastic one: their claims to legitimacy and authority in this play are now validated only by the forces they can muster".

As Jane Howell, director of the BBC Shakespeare adaptation argues, "anarchy is loosed and you're left with a very different set of values – every man for himself. You're into a time of change in which there is no code except survival of the fittest – who happens to be Richard."

The play depicts what happens when "a nation turns on itself in epic savagery, dissolving its own social foundations." Significantly in this sense, the play has no antagonist, and both sides in the conflict are depicted as capable of atrocities in their pursuit of victory. For example, the opening moments of the play see Richard introduced carrying the head of the Duke of Somerset, whom he killed at the end of 2 Henry VI. The degradation of chivalric customs and human decency is emphasised when York responds to Richard's arrival by 'talking' to the head itself; "But is your grace dead, my lord of Somerset" (1.1.18). Michael Hattaway sees this scene as an important prologue to the play insofar as "the act of desecration signifies the extinguishing of the residual chivalric code of conspicuous virtue, the eclipsing of honour by main force."

The abuse of Clifford's body in Act 2, Scene 6, where Edward, Richard, Clarence and Warwick all speak to the corpse in derision, sardonically wondering why it doesn't answer them, is another example of this degradation of moral code. Richard's treatment of Henry's body in the final scene is another example of the lack of reverence for the dead; after Henry's death, Richard stabs the corpse, proclaiming "Down, down to hell, and say I sent thee hither" (5.6.67).

As such, with power being seen by many of the characters as the ultimate goal, the play also deals with themes of disloyalty and betrayal, and outlines the results of Political factionalism and social breakdown; a once calm world is seen spiralling toward chaos. E.M.W. Tillyard has written of the Henry VI trilogy that the second part maintained some chivalry, but that is lost in the third part.

=== Family conflict and family dissolution ===
Just as revenge gives way to a desire for power, so too does national political conflict give way to a petty interfamily feud. For example, the play opens in the aftermath of the First Battle of St Albans (1455), and immediately dramatises the agreement between Henry and York that the House of Lancaster will cede the throne to the House of York upon Henry's death. However, in reality, this agreement was brought about not by the First Battle of St Albans but by the Battle of Northampton in 1460, which Shakespeare chose not to dramatise. Furthermore, the legal settlement whereby Henry agreed to relinquish the crown to the House of York upon his death came about due to lengthy parliamentary debate, not a personal agreement between Henry and York, as it is depicted in the play. As such, a wide-ranging political debate spanning five years, and involving virtually every peer in the country is telescoped in the play to an immediate agreement between two men, thus illustrating the personal nature of the conflict.

Another example of a character who also personalises the national conflict and turns it from a political struggle into a personal quest is Clifford, whose desire for revenge for the death of his father seems to be his only reason for fighting. Clifford seems unconcerned with Henry's ability to lead the country, and his desire for personal vengeance seems to outweigh any sense he has of aiding the House of Lancaster because he believes it to be the right thing to do. Similarly, Warwick's later actions in the play, as he himself acknowledges, have nothing to do with ensuring Henry remain king, but are based wholly on his personal feelings towards Edward; he is more concerned with bringing down the House of York than elevating the House of Lancaster. As such, "the York-Warwick alliance degenerates into an inter-family feud, even more petty in its tit-for-tat predictability than York and Lancaster's squabbles." Although the conflicts depicted in the play are national, they are treated by many of the characters as personal quarrels.

This concentration on the personal and familial aspects of the war leads to another major theme in the play; the dissolution of Family. Throughout the play, family ties are shown to be fragile and constantly under threat. The first breach of familial bonds comes when Henry agrees to pass the crown to the House of York after his death. This disinherits his son and renders the crown a piece of transferable property, rather than a symbol of dynastic heritage or monarchic succession. All of Henry's followers are aghast at this decision, none more so than Margaret.

She is not alone in her efforts to convince Henry that his decision is wrong. Clifford also attempts to persuade him, arguing that fathers who do not pass on their successes to their sons are unnatural.

Henry however, disagrees with Clifford, arguing that passing on the burden of kingship is not necessarily the natural thing for a father to do, as it brings no reward when that title was unlawfully obtained in the first place ("things ill got, had ever bad success": Henry is referring to the deposition and assassination of Richard II by his own grandfather, Henry IV). By disinheriting his son, Henry seems to think he is protecting the Prince, ensuring that he will never suffer the hardships he himself experienced when he was left a usurped inheritance by his own father ("I'll leave my son my virtuous deeds behind and would my father had left me no more").

As such, while Margaret and Clifford argue that Henry has destroyed his family in his deal with York, Henry himself seems to feel that he has done his offspring a favour and prevented him from experiencing future suffering.

York's deal with Henry doesn't just have implications for Henry's family however, it also has implications for York's. York willingly sacrifices personal glory for the sake of his heirs, electing not to become King himself with the promise that his sons and grandsons will be kings instead. However, almost immediately after his deal with Henry, York's family is torn apart. Act 1, Scene 2 symbolically begins with Edward and Richard arguing; "No quarrel but a slight contention" (l.6). Act 1, Scene 3 then depicts the murder of York's youngest son, whilst in Act 1, Scene 4, York himself is tortured and murdered, with the knowledge that Rutland is already dead. In this sense, York functions as a symbolic character insofar as "the personal losses underlining York's political 'tragedy' [magnify] the play's theme of civil war's destruction of family relationships."

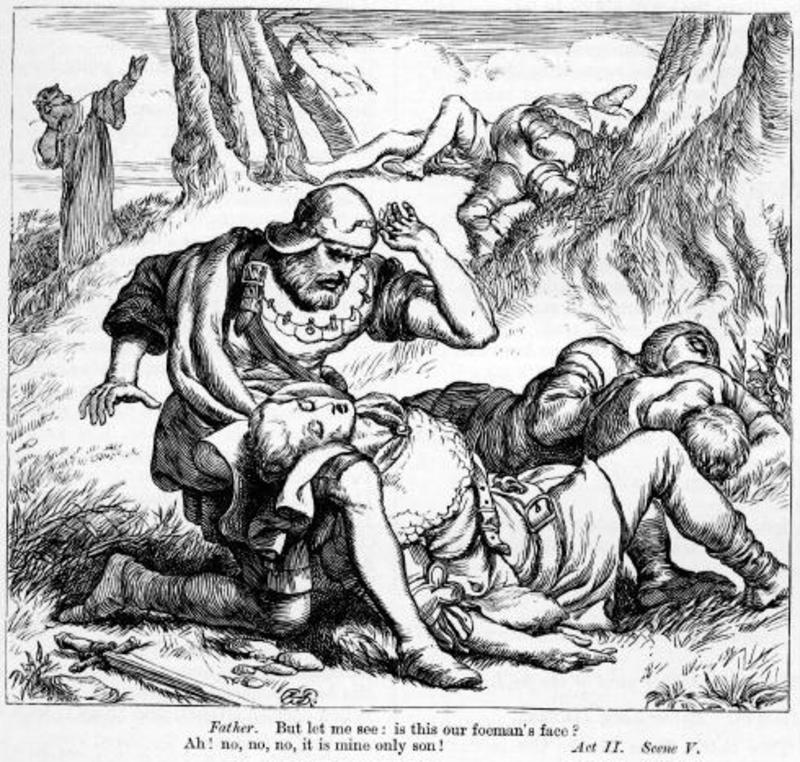
H.C. Selous' illustration of the father and son tragedy in Act 2, Scene 5; from The Plays of William Shakespeare: The Historical Plays, edited by Charles Cowden Clarke and Mary Cowden Clarke (1830)

The dissolution of the House of York however doesn't end with the death of York himself. Later, in Act 3, Scene 2, Richard further dissolves the family by revealing his ambition to usurp Edward's throne, and thereby disinherit Edward's children, his own nephews; "Ay, Edward, use women honourably./Would he were wasted, marrow, bones, and all,/That from his loins no hopeful branch may spring/To cross me from the golden time I look for" (ll.124–127). After murdering Henry, Richard then outlines his plan to bring this about, vowing to turn Edward against Clarence.

In this ambition, Richard proves successful, utterly destroying his own family in the process.

Act 2, Scene 5 from the 1983 BBC Shakespeare adaptation.

Also important to the theme of family dissolution is Act 2, Scene 5, where a father unwittingly kills his son, and a son unwittingly kills his father. Stuart Hampton-Reeves argues that this scene is a symbolic one referring to the conscription debate in England during the 1580s and 1590s. The Dutch Revolt against the Spanish Empire had begun in 1568, and although England and France were both supporting the Dutch, they had officially remained neutral for fear of angering the Spanish. However, in 1585, Elizabeth I signed the Treaty of Nonsuch, which officially brought England into the conflict, with the promise of 6,500 troops (which was then changed to 8,000 troops) for the Dutch. As such, to supply these troops, mobilisation was needed and national conscription was implemented instead of the feudal system. This was not without controversy, and the incident involving the fathers and sons allude to both practices; the feudal system and the national system. Upon discovering he has killed his father, the son laments "From London by the king was I pressed forth./My father, being the Earl of Warwick's man,/Came on the part of York, pressed by his master" (2.5.64–66). The son had left the family home and travelled to London, where he had been conscripted into the king's army upon the outbreak of war. The father had stayed at home and had been compelled to join the army of the local noble (i.e. Warwick). Thus they ended up on opposite sides in the conflict, as regional stability gives way to national discord and social breakdown, and the war begins quite literally to tear families apart.

== Performance ==
After the original 1592 performances, the complete text of 3 Henry VI seems to have been very rarely acted. The first definite performance in England after Shakespeare's day did not occur until 1906, when F. R. Benson presented the play at the Shakespeare Memorial Theatre in a production of Shakespeare's two tetralogies, performed over eight nights. As far as can be ascertained, this was not only the first performance of the octology, but was also the first definite performance of both the tetralogy and the trilogy. Benson himself played Henry and his wife, Constance Benson, played Margaret.

In 1952, Douglas Seale directed a production of 3 Henry VI at the Birmingham Repertory Theatre, following a successful production of 2 Henry VI in 1951. 1 Henry VI would follow in 1953. All three plays starred Paul Daneman as Henry and Rosalind Boxall as Margaret, with 3 Henry VI featuring Alan Bridges as Edward and Edgar Wreford as Richard. Although little was removed from the text, it did end differently from the written play. After Edward has spoken his last lines, everyone leaves the stage except Richard, who walks towards the throne, then turns and looks out to the audience, speaking the first thirty lines of his opening speech from Richard III (from "Now is the winter of our discontent" to "I am determin'd to prove a villain"), at which point the curtain falls. Additionally, in this production, Boxall as Margaret fully participated in the Battle of Tewkesbury, which was considered a bold move at the time.

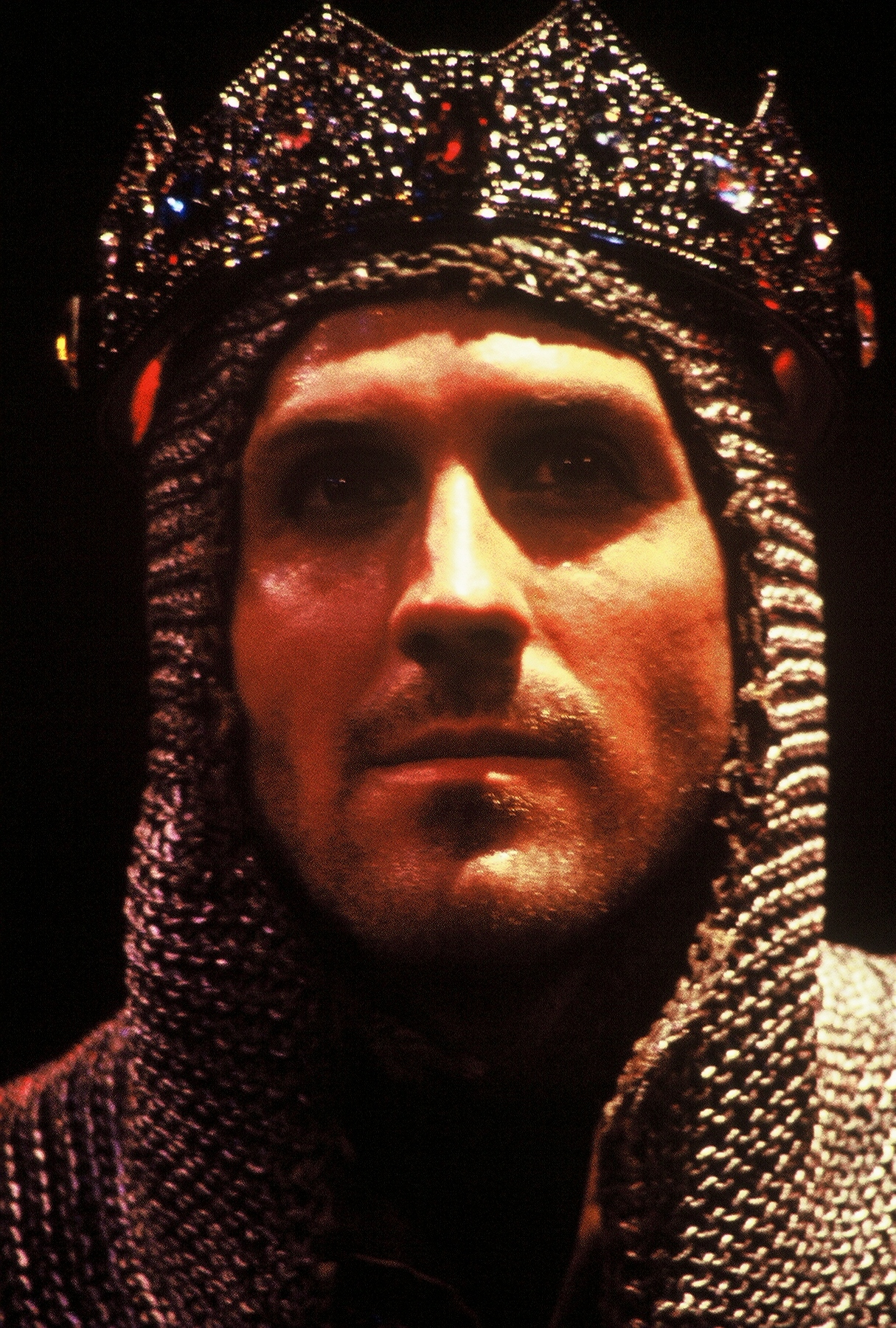
Edward IV (Travis Brazil), in a 2004 Carmel Shakespeare Festival production of the play

A production which made much of its unedited status came in 1977, at the Royal Shakespeare Theatre, where Terry Hands presented all three Henry VI plays with Alan Howard as Henry and Helen Mirren as Margaret. Although the production was only moderately successful at the box office, it was critically lauded at the time for Alan Howard's unique portrayal of Henry. Howard adopted historical details concerning the real Henry's madness into his performance, presenting the character as constantly on the brink of a mental and emotional breakdown. Possibly as a reaction to a recent adaptation of the trilogy under the general title Wars of the Roses, which was strongly political, Hands attempted to ensure his own production was entirely apolitical; "Wars of the Roses was a study in power politics: its central image was the conference table, and Warwick, the scheming king-maker, was the central figure. But that's not Shakespeare. Shakespeare goes far beyond politics. Politics is a very shallow science." Aside from Howard and Mirren, the production starred Alfred Lynch as Edward and Anton Lesser as Richard.

In 1994, Katie Mitchell directed the play as a stand-alone piece for the Royal Shakespeare Company (RSC) at The Other Place theatre in Stratford, under the title Henry VI: The Battle for the Throne. Starring Jonathan Firth as Henry, Ruth Mitchell as Margaret, Tom Smith as Richard and Lloyd Owen as Edward, the play added dialogue (primarily anti-war material) from Gorboduc, Richard II, 2 Henry VI and Richard III. Mitchell cut all on-stage violence, resulting in York, Rutland, Prince Edward and Henry all being killed off-stage. The introduction of the head of Somerset was also removed, with the play beginning instead at line 25, "This is the palace of the fearful king." Also removed was much of Margaret's speech to rouse her army prior to Tewkesbury.

Under the direction of Michael Boyd, the play was presented at the Swan Theatre in Stratford in 2000, with David Oyelowo as Henry, Fiona Bell as Margaret, Tom Beard as Edward and Aidan McArdle as Richard. The play was presented with the other five history plays (Richard II, 1 Henry IV, 2 Henry IV, Henry V and Richard III) to form a complete eight-part history cycle under the general title This England: The Histories (the first time the RSC had ever attempted to stage the eight plays as one sequence). This England: The Histories was revived in 2006, as part of the Complete Works festival at the Courtyard Theatre, with the Henry VI plays again directed by Boyd, and starring Chuk Iwuji as Henry, Katy Stephens as Margaret, Forbes Masson as Edward and Jonathan Slinger as Richard. When the Complete Works wrapped in March 2007, the history plays remained on stage, under the shorter title The Histories, as part of a two-year thirty-four actor ensemble production. 3 Henry VI was performed under the title Henry VI, Part 3: The Chaos. At the end of the two-year programme, the entire octology was performed over a four-day period under the title The Glorious Moment; Richard II was staged on a Thursday evening, followed by the two Henry IV plays on Friday afternoon and evening, the three Henry VI plays on Saturday (two afternoon performances and one evening performance), and Richard III on Sunday evening.

Boyd's production garnered much attention at the time because of his interpolations and additions to the text. Boyd introduced a new character into the trilogy. Called The Keeper, the character never speaks, but upon the death of each major character, the Keeper (played by Edward Clayton in 2000, and by Anthony Bunsee in 2006/2007), wearing all red, would walk onto stage and approach the body. The actor playing the body would then stand up and allow himself to be led off-stage by the figure. The production was also particularly noted for its realistic violence. According to Robert Gore-Langton of the Daily Express, in his review of the original 2000 production, "blood from a severed arm sprayed over my lap. A human liver slopped to the floor by my feet. An eyeball scudded past, then a tongue."

In 2012, the trilogy was staged at Shakespeare's Globe as part of the Globe to Globe Festival, with each play performed by a different Balkans based company and offered as a commentary on the recent history of violence in that region. 3 Henry VI was staged by the Macedonian company National Theatre Bitola, directed by John Blondell, and starring Petar Gorko as Henry, Gabriela Petrusevska as Margaret, Nikolche Projchevski as Edward and Martin Mirchevski as Richard. In 2013, Nick Bagnall directed another production of the trilogy at the Globe. All three plays were performed each day, beginning at midday, under the overall title Henry VI: Three Plays. 3 Henry VI was performed under the title Henry VI: The True Tragedy of the Duke of York. Each of the plays was edited down to two hours, and the entire trilogy was performed with a cast of fourteen actors. On several specific dates, the plays were performed at the actual locations where some of the original events took place and streamed live to the theatre; "battlefield productions" were staged at Towton (Battle of Towton from 3 Henry VI), Tewkesbury (Battle of Tewkesbury from 3 Henry VI), St Albans Cathedral (First Battle of St Albans from 2 Henry VI and Second Battle of St Albans from 3 Henry VI), and Monken Hadley Common (Battle of Barnet from 3 Henry VI). The production starred Graham Butler as Henry, Mary Doherty as Margaret, Patrick Myles as Edward and Simon Harrison as Richard.

Outside the UK, the first major American performance was in 1935 at the Pasadena Playhouse in California, directed by Gilmore Brown, as part of a production of all ten Shakespearean histories (the two tetralogies, preceded by King John and proceeded by Henry VIII). In 2010 in New York City, the independent theatre company Wide Eyed Productions, in association with Columbia University, mounted a stand-alone production of the play at the East 13th Street Theatre (home of Classic Stage Company). The production was directed by Adam Marple and featured Nat Cassidy as Henry, Candace Thompson as Margaret, Sky Seals as Edward and Ben Newman as Richard. It was noted as being a rare opportunity to see the play on its own and was well received – particularly for its staging of the conclusion, in which Henry's corpse remained onstage, doused in a steady rain of blood, throughout Edward IV's final scene, after which a naked and feral Richard bolts onstage and delivers the opening lines of Richard III, before literally eating the throne. The play also featured a huge portrait of Henry V wallpapered to the upstage wall that was steadily torn apart over the course of the play.

In Europe, unedited stagings of the play took place at the Weimar Court Theatre in 1857. Directed by Franz von Dingelstedt, it was performed as the seventh part of the octology, with all eight plays staged over a ten-day period. A major production was staged at the Burgtheater in Vienna in 1873. Jocza Savits directed a production of the tetralogy at the Munich Court Theatre in 1889 and again in 1906. In 1927, Saladin Schmitt presented the unedited octology at the Municipal Theatre in Bochum. Denis Llorca staged the tetralogy as one twelve-hour piece in Carcassonne in 1978 and in Créteil in 1979. In 1999, director Ruediger Burbach presented 2 Henry VI and 3 Henry VI at the Zurich Playhouse. This production was unique insofar as a woman (Katharina Schmoelzer) played Henry. Margaret was played by Katharina von Bock.

== Theatrical adaptations ==
Evidence for the first adaptation of 3 Henry VI is found during the Restoration, when, in 1681, John Crowne created a two-part play entitled Henry the Sixth, The First Part and The Misery of Civil War. Henry comprised Acts 1–3 of 2 Henry VI focusing on the death of Gloucester, Misery adapted the last two acts of 2 Henry VI and much of 3 Henry VI. Writing at the time of Popish Plot, Crowne, who was a devout royalist, used his adaptation to warn about the danger of allowing England to descend into another civil war, which would be the case should the Whig party rise to power. Changes to the text include a new, albeit silent scene just prior to the Battle of Wakefield where York embraces Rutland before heading out to fight; an extension of the courtship between Edward and Lady Grey, and the edition of two subplots; one concerning a mistress of Edward's whom he accidentally kills in battle (an allusion to Francis Beaumont and John Fletcher's Philaster), the other involving an attempt by Warwick to seduce Lady Grey after her husband's death at the Second Battle of St. Albans (this is later used as a rationale for why Warwick turns against Edward). Also worth noting is that the role of Margaret in 3 Henry VI was removed almost entirely, reducing her to two scenes; the death of York and the death of Prince Edward.

3 Henry VI was also partly incorporated into Colley Cibber's The Tragical History of King Richard the Third, containing the Distresses and Death of King Henry the Sixth (1699), one of the most successful Shakespearean adaptations of all time. The play was half Shakespeare, half new material. 3 Henry VI was used as the source for Act 1, which dramatised Henry's lamentation about the burdens of Kingship (2.5), the battle of Tewkesbury (Act 5 – although Margaret's speech in Act 5, Scene 1 was replaced with Henry V's "once more unto the breach" speech from Henry V and is spoken by Warwick) and Richard's murder of Henry in the tower (5.6). Richard's soliloquy in Act 2 of Tragical History was also based upon his soliloquy in Act 3, Scene 2 of 3 Henry VI.

Colley's son, Theophilus Cibber wrote his own adaptation, King Henry VI: A Tragedy in 1723, using Act 5 of 2 Henry VI and Act 1 and 2 of 3 Henry VI. Performed at Drury Lane, Colley appeared as Winchester. As had Crowne, Cibber created a new scene involving Rutland; after the death of York, he and Rutland are laid side by side on the battlefield.

In 1817, Edmund Kean appeared in J.H. Merivale's Richard Duke of York; or the Contention of York and Lancaster, which used material from all three Henry VI plays, but removed everything not directly related to York; the play ended with his death, which occurs in Act 1, Scene 4 of 3 Henry VI. Material from 3 Henry VI included the opening few scenes involving York taking the throne from Henry, preparing for battle, and then the battle itself.

Following Merivale's example, Robert Atkins adapted all three plays into a single piece for a performance at The Old Vic in 1923 as part of the celebrations for the tercentenary of the First Folio. Guy Martineau played Henry and Esther Whitehouse played Margaret. Atkins himself played Richard.

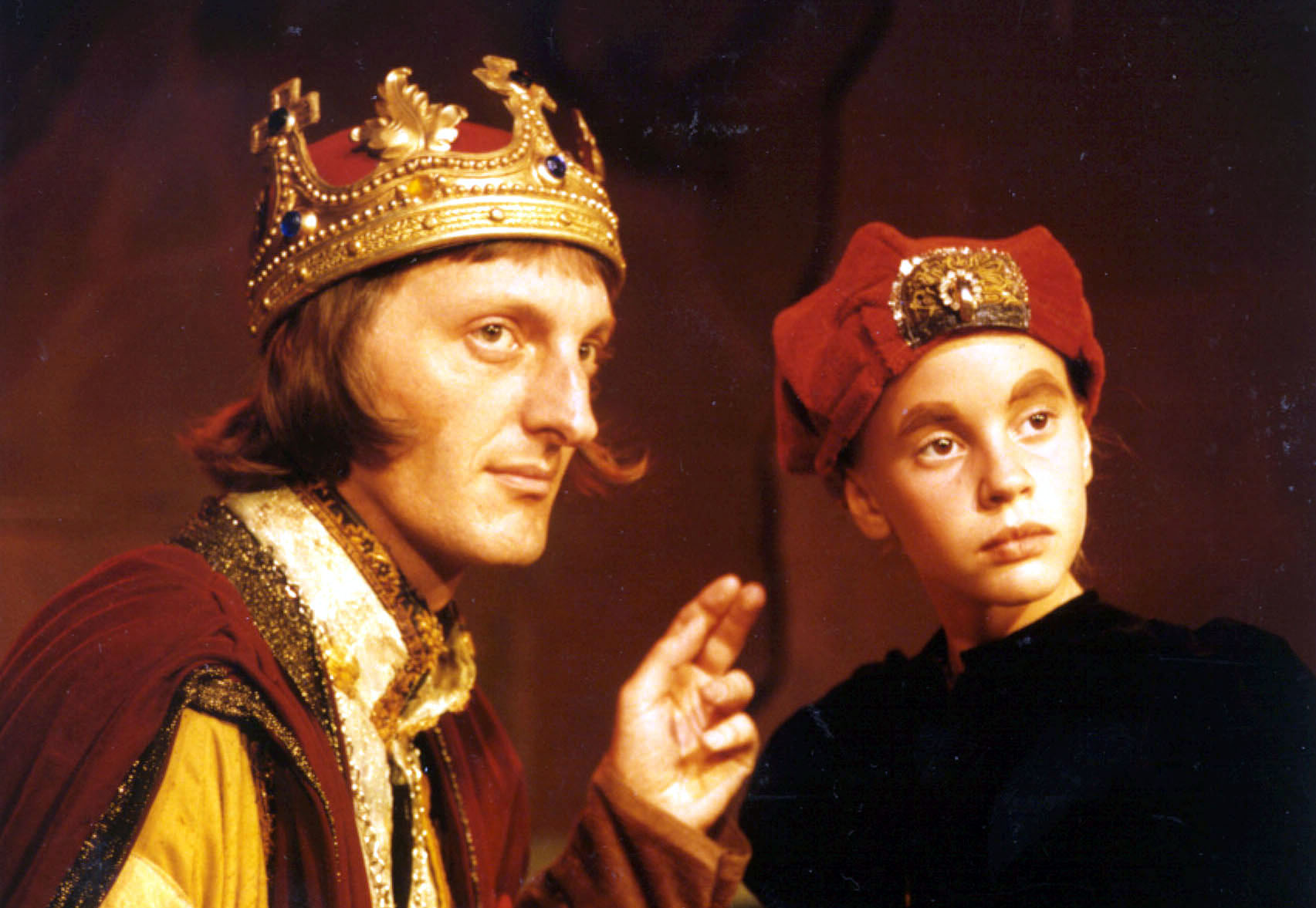
Henry VI (Jeffrey T. Heyer) and the young Earl of Richmond (Ashley Rose Miller) in the West Coast premiere of The Plantagenets: The Rise of Edward IV, staged at Pacific Repertory Theatre in 1993

The success of the 1951–1953 Douglas Seale stand-alone productions of each of the individual plays in Birmingham prompted him to present the three plays together at the Old Vic in 1957 under the general title The Wars of the Roses. Barry Jackson adapted the text, altering the trilogy into a two-part play; 1 Henry VI and 2 Henry VI were combined (with almost all of 1 Henry VI eliminated) and 3 Henry VI was edited down, with most of Act 4 removed, thus reducing the importance of Edward in the overall play. Seale again directed, with Paul Daneman again appearing as Henry, Alan Bridges as Edward and Edgar Wreford as Richard, alongside Barbara Jefford as Margaret. As with Seale's 1953 Birmingham production, the end of 3 Henry VI was altered to include the opening of Richard III.

The production which is usually credited with establishing the reputation of the play in the modern theatre is John Barton and Peter Hall's 1963/1964 RSC production of the tetralogy, adapted into a three-part series, under the general title The Wars of the Roses, at the Royal Shakespeare Theatre. The first play (entitled simply Henry VI) featured a much shortened version of 1 Henry VI and half of 2 Henry VI (up to the death of Cardinal Beaufort). The second play (entitled Edward IV) featured the second half of 2 Henry VI and a shortened version of 3 Henry VI, which was then followed by a shortened version of Richard III as the third play. In all, 1,450 lines written by Barton were added to 6,000 lines of original Shakespearean material, with a total of 12,350 lines removed. The production starred David Warner as Henry, Peggy Ashcroft as Margaret, Roy Dotrice as Edward and Ian Holm as Richard. Barton and Hall were both especially concerned that the plays reflect the contemporary political environment, with the civil chaos and breakdown of society depicted in the plays mirrored in the contemporary milieu, by events such as the building of the Berlin Wall in 1961, the Cuban Missile Crisis in 1962 and the assassination of John F. Kennedy in 1963. Hall allowed these events to reflect themselves in the production, arguing that "we live among war, race riots, revolutions, assassinations, and the imminent threat of extinction. The theatre is, therefore, examining fundamentals in staging the Henry VI plays." They were also influenced by politically focused literary theory of the time; both had attended the 1956 London visit of Bertolt Brecht's Berliner Ensemble, both were subscribers to Antonin Artaud's theory of "Theatre of Cruelty", and Hall had read an English translation of Jan Kott's influential Shakespeare Our Contemporary in 1964 prior to its publication in Britain. Both Barton and Hall were also supporters of E.M.W. Tillyard's 1944 book Shakespeare's History Plays, which was still a hugely influential text in Shakespearian scholarship, especially in terms of its argument that Shakespeare in the tetralogy was advancing the Tudor myth.

Another major adaptation was staged in 1986 by the English Shakespeare Company, under the direction of Michael Bogdanov. This touring production opened at the Old Vic, and subsequently toured for two years, performing at, amongst other places, the Panasonic Globe Theatre in Tokyo, Japan (as the inaugural play of the arena), the Festival dei Due Mondi in Spoleto, Italy and at the Adelaide Festival in Adelaide, Australia. Following the structure established by Barton and Hall, Bogdanov combined 1 Henry VI and the first half of 2 Henry VI into one play, and the second half of 2 Henry VI and 3 Henry VI into another, using the same titles as Barton (Henry VI and The Rise of Edward IV). Also like Barton and Hall, Bogdanov concentrated on political issues, although he made them far more overt than had his predecessors. For example, played by June Watson, Margaret was closely modelled after the British Prime Minister at the time, Margaret Thatcher, even to the point of having similar clothes and hair. Likewise, Paul Brennan's Henry was modelled after the King Edward VIII, prior to his abdication. Bogdanov also employed frequent anachronisms and contemporary visual registers, in an effort to show the relevance of the politics in the fifteenth century to the contemporary period. The production was noted for its pessimism as regards contemporary British politics, with some critics feeling the political resonances were too heavy handed. However, the series was a huge box office success. Alongside Watson and Brennan, the play starred Philip Bowen as Edward and Andrew Jarvis as Richard.

Another adaptation of the tetralogy by the Royal Shakespeare Company followed in 1988, performed at the Barbican. Adapted by Charles Wood and directed by Adrian Noble, the Barton/Hall structure was again followed, reducing the trilogy to two plays by dividing 2 Henry VI in the middle. The resulting trilogy was entitled The Plantagenets, with the individual plays entitled Henry VI, The Rise of Edward IV and Richard III, His Death. Starring Ralph Fiennes as Henry, Penny Downie as Margaret, Ken Bones as Edward and Anton Lesser as Richard, the production was extremely successful with both audiences and critics. This play ended with the line "Now is the winter of our discontent;" the opening line from Richard III.

Michael Bogdanov and the English Shakespeare Company presented a different adaptation at the Swansea Grand Theatre in 1991, using the same cast as on the touring production. All eight plays from the history cycle were presented over a seven night period, with each play receiving one performance only, and with only twenty-eight actors portraying the nearly five hundred roles. Whilst the other five plays in the cycle were unadapted, the Henry VI plays were combined into two, using the Barton/Hall structure, with the first was named The House of Lancaster and the second, The House of York.

In 2000, Edward Hall presented the trilogy as a two-part series at the Watermill Theatre in Newbury. Hall followed the Jackson/Seale structure, combining 1 Henry VI and 2 Henry VI into one play which all but eliminated 1 Henry VI and following this with an edited version of 3 Henry VI. This production was noted for how it handled the violence of the play. The set was designed to look like an abattoir, but rather than attempt to present the violence realistically (as most productions do), Hall went in the other direction; presenting the violence symbolically. Whenever a character was decapitated or killed, a red cabbage was sliced up whilst the actor mimed the death beside it.

In 2001, Tom Markus directed an adaptation of the tetralogy at the Colorado Shakespeare Festival. Condensing all fours plays into one, Markus named the play Queen Margaret, doing much the same with the character of Margaret as Merivale had done with York. Margaret was played by Gloria Biegler, Henry by Richard Haratine, Edward by John Jurcheck and Richard by Chip Persons.

Poster from the 2001 Shakespeare's Rugby Wars

Another unusual 2001 adaptation of the tetralogy was entitled Shakespeare's Rugby Wars. Written by Matt Toner and Chris Coculuzzi, and directed by Coculuzzi, the play was acted by the Upstart Crow Theatre Group and staged outdoors at the Robert Street Playing Field as part of the Toronto Fringe Festival. Presented as if it were a live rugby match between York and Lancaster, the 'play' featured commentary from Falstaff (Stephen Flett), which was broadcast live for the audience. The 'match' itself was refereed by 'Bill Shakespeare' (played by Coculuzzi), and the actors (whose characters names all appeared on their jerseys) had microphones attached and would recite dialogue from all four plays at key moments.

In 2002, Leon Rubin presented the tetralogy as a trilogy at the Stratford Shakespeare Festival in Ontario. Using the Barton/Hall method of combining 1 Henry VI with the first half of 2 Henry VI, and the second half of 2 Henry VI with 3 Henry VI, the plays were renamed Henry VI: Revenge in France and Henry VI: Revolt in England. Michael Thierry played Henry, Seana McKenna played Margaret, Rami Posner played Edward and Thom Marriott played Richard.

Also in 2002, Edward Hall and the Propeller Company presented a one-play all-male cast modern dress adaptation of the trilogy at the Watermill Theatre. Under the title Rose Rage, Hall used a cast of only thirteen actors to portray the nearly one hundred and fifty speaking roles in the four-hour production, thus necessitating doubling and tripling of parts. Although a new adaptation, this production followed the Jackson/Seale method of eliminating almost all of 1 Henry VI. The original cast included Jonathan McGuinness as Henry, Robert Hands as Margaret, Tim Treloar as Edward and Richard Clothier as Richard. After a successful run at the Haymarket, the play moved to the Chicago Shakespeare Theater. The American cast included Carman Lacivita as Henry, Scott Parkinson as Margaret, Fletcher McTaggart as Edward and Bruce A. Young as Richard.

Outside England, a major European adaptation of the tetralogy took place in 1864 in Weimar under the direction of Franz von Dingelstedt, who, seven years previously had staged the play unedited. Dingelstedt turned the trilogy into a two-parter under the general name Die weisse rose. The first play was called Haus Lancaster, the second Haus York. This adaptation was unique insofar as both plays were created by combining material from all three Henry VI plays. Following this structure, Alfred von Walzogen also produced a two-part play in 1875, under the general title Edward IV. Another European adaptation was in 1965 at the Teatro Piccolo in Milan. Directed by Giorgio Strehler it went under the title Il gioco del potenti (The Play of the Mighty). Using Barton and Hall's structure, Strehler also added several characters, including a Chorus, who used monologues from Richard II, both parts of Henry IV, Henry V, Macbeth and Timon of Athens, and two gravediggers called Bevis and Holland (after the names of two of Cade's rebels in the Folio text of 2 Henry VI), who commented (with dialogue written by Strehler himself) on each of the major characters as they set about burying them. A major German adaptation was Peter Palitzsch's two-part adaptation of the trilogy as Der krieg der rosen in 1967 at the Stuttgart State Theatre. Condensing the three plays into two, Heinrich VI and Eduard IV, Palitzsch's adaptation concluded with the opening monologue from Richard III.

== Adaptations on screen ==
=== Film ===
Although 3 Henry VI itself has never been adapted directly for the cinema, extracts from it have been used in many of the cinematic adaptations of Richard III.

The first such adaptation was 1911 twenty-two-minute silent version of Richard III, directed by and starring F.R. Benson. Filmed as part of a series intended by Benson to promote the Shakespeare Memorial Theatre at Stratford, the piece was pure filmed theatre, with each scene shot on-stage in a single take by an unmoving camera. Each single shot scene is prefaced by a scene-setting intertitle and a brief quotation from the text. Of thirteen scenes in total, the first two are taken from 3 Henry VI; the murder of Prince Edward and the banishment of Queen Margaret (Act 5, Scene 5) and Richard's murder of Henry in the Tower (Act 5, Scene 6). Similarly, the 1912 American adaptation, directed by James Keane and André Calmettes opened with the same two scenes; the murder of Prince Edward and the murder of Henry VI.

The play was also used in one of the earliest sound films; the 1929 John G. Adolfi movie The Show of Shows; a revue-style production featuring extracts from numerous plays, musicals and novels. Richard's soliloquy from Act 3, Scene 2 was used in the film, recited by John Barrymore, who delivers the speech after the opening dialogue of 3 Henry VI concerning Somerset's head. Barrymore had recently starred in a production of Richard III on Broadway, and this speech had been singled out by critics as the best in the entire production, so he chose to reproduce it. Film critics proved just as impressed with the speech as had theatrical critics, and it was generally regarded as the finest moment of the film.

Extracts from the play were also used in Laurence Olivier's 1955 film adaptation of Richard III, starring Olivier himself as Richard. The film begins with the coronation of Edward IV, which happens between 3.1 and 3.2 of 3 Henry VI, and then moves into a shortened version of Act 5, Scene 7; the final scene from 3 Henry VI. The opening lines of the film are Edward's, a truncated version of ll. 1–20. Apart from the omission of some lines, the most noticeable departure from the text of 5.7 is the inclusion of two characters who do not appear in the play; the Duke of Buckingham and Jane Shore. Buckingham is a major character throughout Richard III, where he is Richard's closest ally for a time. Jane Shore is mentioned several times in Richard III, and although she never features as a character, she is often included in productions of the play. After the conclusion of Act 5, Scene 7 from 3 Henry VI, the film then moves on to the opening soliloquy from Act 1, Scene 1 of Richard III. However, after twenty-three lines, it then moves back to 3 Henry VI, quoting from Richard's soliloquy in Act 3, Scene 2. At this point, the film returns to lines twenty-four to twenty-eight of Richard III, before again returning to Act 3, Scene 2 of 3 Henry VI.The film then moves into Act 1, Scene 2 of Richard III. At the conclusion of Act 1, Scene 2, it then returns to 3 Henry VI a final time, to Richard's soliloquy after murdering Henry in Act 5, Scene 6.

Richard Loncraine's 1995 filmic adaptation of Richard Eyre's 1990 stage production of Richard III features considerably less material from 3 Henry VI than had Olivier's film. The film begins prior to the Battle of Tewkesbury, with Henry VI still in power. The opening scene depicts Henry and his son Edward preparing for the forthcoming battle. However, a surprise attack is launched on their headquarters by Richard, and both are killed. This scene is without dialogue. The last line of 3 Henry VI is also used in the film; Edward's "For here I hope begins our lasting joy" appears as a subtitle after the coronation of Edward and is altered to read "And now, they hope, begins their lasting joy", with "they" referring to the House of York. The film then moves on to the coronation of Edward IV (again without dialogue), before Richard delivers the opening speech of Richard III as an after-dinner toast to the new king. Like Olivier's film, Loncraine includes several characters in the coronation scene who are not present in the text of 3 Henry VI; Buckingham, Richmond, and Elizabeth Plantagenet. Richmond will later go on to be Henry VII, and Elizabeth (King Edward's daughter) will become his queen. As with Jane Shore, Elizabeth is mentioned several times in Richard III, although she never appears in the text. Loncraine's film also used a line from 3 Henry VI in its poster campaign – "I can smile and murder whiles I smile" (3.2.182), although "whiles" was changed to "while." This line is also included in the film – after Richard concludes his opening speech to Edward, he enters the men's room and continues in soliloquy form.

=== Television ===
The first television adaptation of the play was in 1960 when the BBC produced a serial entitled An Age of Kings. The show comprised fifteen sixty- and seventy-five-minute episodes which adapted all eight of Shakespeare's sequential history plays. Directed by Michael Hayes and produced by Peter Dews, with a script by Eric Crozier, the production featured Terry Scully as Henry, Mary Morris as Margaret, Julian Glover as Edward and Paul Daneman as Richard. The twelfth episode, "The Morning's War" covers Acts 1, 2 and Act 3, Scenes 1 and 2, concluding with Richard's soliloquy wherein he vows to attain the crown. The thirteenth episode, "The Sun in Splendour", presents everything from Act 3, Scene 3 onwards, beginning with Margaret's visit to Louis XI in France. With each episode running one hour, a great deal of text was necessarily removed, but aside from truncation, only minor alterations were made to the original.

In 1965, BBC 1 broadcast all three plays from John Barton and Peter Hall's The Wars of the Roses trilogy (Henry VI, The Rise of Edward IV and Richard III). Directed for television by Robin Midgley and Michael Hayes, the plays were presented as more than simply filmed theatre, with the core idea being "to recreate theatre production in televisual terms – not merely to observe it, but to get to the heart of it." Filming was done on the RSC stage, but not during actual performances, thus allowing cameras to get close to the actors, and cameramen with hand-held cameras to shoot battle scenes. Additionally, camera platforms were created around the theatre. In all, twelve cameras were used, allowing the final product to be edited more like a film than a piece of static filmed theatre. Filming was done following the 1964 run of the plays at Stratford-upon-Avon, and took place over an eight-week period, with fifty-two BBC staff working alongside eighty-four RSC staff to bring the project to fruition. In 1966, the production was repeated on BBC 1 where it was re-edited into eleven episodes of fifty minutes each. The fifth episode, "The Fearful King" covered 2 Henry VI Act 5 (beginning with Henry pardoning Jack Cade's followers) and 3 Henry VI Act 1 and Act 2, Scene 1, concluding with Warwick rallying Edward, Richard and George after their father's death. The sixth episode, "The Kingmaker", presented Act 2, Scene 2 up to Act 3, Scene 3, concluding with Warwick's avowal to remove Edward from the throne and restore Henry. The seventh episode, "Edward of York", presented Act 3, Scene 4 to Act 5, Scene 5 (concluding with the death of Prince Edward). The eight episode, "The Prophetess", presented the rest of 3 Henry VI (beginning with Richard's murder of Henry) as well as Richard III Act 1, Scenes 1, 2 and 3 (concluding with Richard sending two murderers to kill George).

The play also featured in ITV's Will Shakespeare, a 1978 six-part (heavily fictionalised) biopic of Shakespeare (Tim Curry), written by John Mortimer. Episode one, "Dead Shepherd", focuses on Shakespeare's apprenticeship to Christopher Marlowe (Ian McShane), during which time he writes the Henry VI trilogy. Specifically focused upon is Act 2, Scene 5; the scene of the son killing his father and the father killing his son.

===== Jane Howell's BBC Television Shakespeare edition =====
Another television version of the play was produced by the BBC in 1982 for their BBC Television Shakespeare series, although the episode didn't air until 1983. Directed by Jane Howell, the play was presented as the third part of the tetralogy (all four adaptations directed by Howell) with linked casting; Henry was played by Peter Benson, Margaret by Julia Foster, Edward by Brian Protheroe and Richard by Ron Cook. Howell's presentation of the complete first historical tetralogy was one of the most lauded achievements of the entire BBC series, and prompted Stanley Wells to argue that the productions were "probably purer than any version given in the theatre since Shakespeare's time." Michael Mannheim was similarly impressed, calling the tetralogy "a fascinating, fast paced and surprisingly tight-knit study in political and national deterioration."

The Battle of Tewkesbury from Act 5, Scene 4, in the 1982 BBC Shakespeare adaptation; note the similarity in the costumes of the two sets of combatants – it is virtually impossible to tell the Yorkists from the Lancastrians

Inspired by the notion that the political intrigues behind the Wars of the Roses often seemed like playground squabbles, Howell and production designer Oliver Bayldon staged the four plays in a single set resembling a children's adventure playground. Furthermore, little attempt was made at realism, for example, Bayldon did not disguise the parquet flooring ("it stops the set from literally representing [...] it reminds us we are in a modern television studio"), and in all four productions, the title of the play is displayed within the set itself (on banners in 1 Henry VI and 2 Henry VI (where it is visible throughout the entire first scene), on a shroud in 3 Henry VI, and written on a chalkboard by Richard himself in Richard III).

Many critics felt these set design choices lent the production an air of Brechtian verfremdungseffekt. Stanley Wells wrote of the set that it was intended to invite the viewer to "accept the play's artificiality of language and action," Michael Hattaway describes it as "anti-illusionist," Susan Willis argues that the set allows the productions "to reach theatrically toward the modern world" and Ronald Knowles writes "a major aspect of the set was the subliminal suggestion of childlike anarchy, role-playing, rivalry, game and vandalism, as if all culture were precariously balanced on the shaky foundations of atavistic aggression and power-mad possession." As the four plays progressed, the set decayed and became more and more dilapidated as social order became more fractious.

In the same vein, the costumes became more and more monotone as the plays went on – The First Part of Henry the Sixt features brightly coloured costumes which clearly distinguish the various combatants from one another, but by The Tragedy of Richard III, everyone fights in similarly coloured dark costumes, with little to differentiate one army from another. The scene where Richard kills Henry has three biblical references carefully worked out by Howell; as Richard drags Henry away, his arms spread out into a crucified position; on the table at which he sat are seen bread and wine, and in the background, an iron crossbar is faintly illuminated against the black stone wall. Graham Holderness saw Howell's non-naturalistic production as something of a reaction to the BBC's adaptation of the Henriad in seasons one and two, which had been directed by David Giles in the traditional and straightforward manner favoured by then series producer Cedric Messina.

Although Howell's The Third Part of Henry the Sixt was based on the folio text rather than the octavo, it departed from that text in a number of places. For example, it opens differently from the play, with the first twenty-four lines absent. Instead it begins with Edward, Richard, Clarence, Warwick and Norfolk hacking down the door of parliament and Warwick proclaiming "This is the palace of the fearful king" (1.1.25). The opening scene also differs from the play insofar as Clarence is present from the start whereas in the play he is only introduced in Act 2, Scene 2 (Clarence was introduced, along with Edward and Richard, in the final scene of the preceding adaptation). As well as the opening twenty-four lines, numerous other lines were cut from almost every scene.

There were also some additions to the text, most noticeably some lines from True Tragedy. In Act 1, Scene 1, for example, four lines are added at the beginning of Henry's declaration that he would rather see civil war than yield the throne. Between lines 124 and 125, Henry states "Ah Plantagenet, why seekest thou to depose me?/Are we not both Plantagenets by birth?/And from two brothers lineally descent?/Suppose by right and equity thou be king...". Also in Act 1, Scene 1, a line is inserted between lines 174 and 175. When York asks Henry if he agrees to the truce, Henry replies "Convey the soldiers hence, and then I will." In Act 2, Scene 6, a line is inserted between lines 7 and 8; "The common people swarm like summerflies." Most significant however is Act 5, Scene 1, where the entirety of Clarence's return to the Lancastrians is taken from True Tragedy, which completely replaces the depiction of the scene in 3 Henry VI. Others changes include the transferral of lines to characters other than those who speak them in the Folio text, particularly in relation to Clarence, who is given numerous lines in the early part of the play. For example, in Act 2, Scene 1, it is Clarence who says Edward's "I wonder how our princely father scaped,/Or whether he be scaped away or no/From Clifford and Northumberland's pursuit" (ll.1–3). Also worth noting is that Elizabeth's son, the Marquess of Dorset, is introduced just after the marriage of Elizabeth and Edward (Act 4, Scene 1). In the text, Dorset doesn't appear until Richard III.

A notable stylistic technique used in the adaptation is the multiple addresses direct to camera.

In other languages

In 1964, Austrian channel ORF 2 presented an adaptation of the trilogy by Leopold Lindtberg under the title Heinrich VI. The cast list from this production has been lost. In 1969, German channel ZDF presented a filmed version of the first part of Peter Palitzsch's 1967 two-part adaptation of the trilogy in Stuttgart, Heinrich VI: Der Kreig der Rosen 1. The second part, Eduard IV: Der Kreig der Rosen 2, was screened in 1971.

== Other adaptations ==
=== Radio ===
In 1923, extracts from all three Henry VI plays were broadcast on BBC Radio, performed by the Cardiff Station Repertory Company as the third episode of a series of programs showcasing Shakespeare's plays, entitled Shakespeare Night. In 1947, BBC Third Programme aired a one-hundred-and-fifty-minute adaptation of the trilogy as part of their Shakespeare's Historical Plays series, a six-part adaptation of the eight sequential history plays, with linked casting. Adapted by Maurice Roy Ridley, King Henry VI starred John Byron as Henry, Gladys Young as Margaret, Francis de Wolff as York and Stephen Murray as Richard. In 1952, Third Programme aired an adaptation of the tetralogy by Peter Watts and John Dover Wilson under the general name The Wars of the Roses. The tetralogy was adapted into a trilogy but in an unusual way. 1 Henry VI was simply removed, so the trilogy contained only 2 Henry VI, 3 Henry VI and Richard III. The reason for this was explained by Dover Wilson, who argued that 1 Henry VI is "patchwork in which Shakespeare collaborated with inferior dramatists." The adaptation starred Valentine Dyall as Henry, Sonia Dresdel as Margaret, John Glen as Edward and Donald Wolfit as Richard. In 1971, BBC Radio 3 presented a two-part adaptation of the trilogy by Raymond Raikes. Part 1 contained an abridged 1 Henry VI and an abridged version of the first three acts of 2 Henry VI. Part 2 presented Acts 4 and 5 of 2 Henry VI and an abridged 3 Henry VI. Nigel Lambert played Henry, Barbara Jefford played Margaret and Ian McKellen played both York and Richard. In 1977, BBC Radio 4 presented a 26-part serialisation of the eight sequential history plays under the general title Vivat Rex (long live the King). Adapted by Martin Jenkins as part of the celebration of the Silver Jubilee of Elizabeth II, 3 Henry VI comprised episodes 19 ("Warwick the Kingmaker") and 20 ("The Tower"). James Laurenson played Henry, Peggy Ashcroft played Margaret, Ian Ogilvy played Edward and Richard Burton narrated.

In America, in 1936, a heavily edited adaptation of the trilogy was broadcast as part of NBC Blue's Radio Guild series. Comprising three sixty-minute episodes aired a week apart, the adaptation was written by Vernon Radcliffe and starred Henry Herbert as Henry and Janet Nolan as Margaret. In 1954, CBC Radio presented an adaptation of the trilogy by Andrew Allen, who combined 1 Henry VI, 2 Henry VI and 3 Henry VI into a one hundred and sixty-minute episode. There is no known cast information for this production.

In 1985, German radio channel Sender Freies Berlin broadcast a heavily edited seventy-six-minute two-part adaptation of the octology adapted by Rolf Schneider, under the title Shakespeare's Rosenkriege.

=== Manga ===
Aya Kanno's Japanese manga comic Requiem of the Rose King is a loose adaptation of the first Shakespearean historical tetralogy, covering Henry VI and Richard III.
