= David Luff =

Australian journalist (born 1969)

David Luff (born 1969), is a former senior journalist with the Sydney-based, Rupert Murdoch-owned newspaper The Daily Telegraph, and a former senior media adviser to the then Prime Minister of Australia, John Howard.

Prior to the 2007 Australian election, he was the subject of some media attention with admirers wearing "I love Luffy" T-shirts.

After the 2007 election David went to work as the media adviser to Australian telecommunication company, Telstra.

Effective 2 November 2009, David Luff joined Rio Tinto in the new role of chief adviser, Media Relations, Australia Asia, based in Melbourne.
