= BBC Television Shakespeare =

Series of TV adaptations of Shakespeare's plays

- UK DVD Box-Set
- Also known as: The Shakespeare Collection [UK]; The Complete Dramatic Works of William Shakespeare [US]
- Genre: Comedy, Tragedy, History
- Created by: Cedric Messina
- Written by: William Shakespeare
- Theme music composer: William Walton (Seasons 1 & 2); Stephen Oliver (Seasons 3–5)
- Country of origin: United Kingdom
- Original language: English
- No. of series: 7
- No. of episodes: 37

Production
- Producers: Cedric Messina (Seasons 1 & 2); Jonathan Miller (Seasons 3 & 4); Shaun Sutton (Seasons 5, 6 & 7)
- Camera setup: Multiple-camera setup
- Production companies: BBC Television; Time Life

Original release
- Network: BBC2
- Release: 3 December 1978 – 27 April 1985

The BBC Television Shakespeare is a series of British television adaptations of the plays of William Shakespeare, created by Cedric Messina and broadcast by BBC Television. Transmitted in the UK from 3 December 1978 to 27 April 1985, the series spanned seven seasons and thirty-seven episodes.

Development began in 1975 when Messina saw that the grounds of Glamis Castle would make a perfect location for an adaptation of Shakespeare's As You Like It for the Play of the Month series. Upon returning to London, however, he had come to envision an entire series devoted exclusively to the dramatic works of Shakespeare. When he encountered a less than enthusiastic response from the BBC's departmental heads, Messina bypassed the usual channels and took his idea directly to the top of the BBC hierarchy, who greenlit the show. Experiencing financial, logistical and creative problems in the early days of production, Messina persevered and served as executive producer for two years. When he was replaced by Jonathan Miller at the start of season three, the show experienced something of a creative renaissance as strictures on the directors' interpretations of the plays were loosened, a policy continued under Shaun Sutton, who took over as executive producer for seasons five, six and seven. By the end of its run, the series had proved both a ratings and a financial success.

Initially, the adaptations received generally negative reviews, although the reception improved somewhat as the series went on, and directors were allowed more freedom, leading to interpretations becoming more daring. Several episodes are now held in high esteem, particularly some of the traditionally lesser-known and less frequently staged plays. The complete set is a popular collection, and several episodes represent the only non-theatrical production of the particular play currently available on DVD. From 26 May 2020, all 37 plays became available to stream in North America via BritBox. As of May 2025, they were no longer available on Britbox.

== Introduction ==
=== Origins ===
The concept for the series originated in 1975 with Cedric Messina, a BBC producer who specialised in television productions of theatrical classics, while he was on location at Glamis Castle in Angus, Scotland, shooting an adaptation of J. M. Barrie's The Little Minister for the BBC's Play of the Month series. During his time on set, Messina realised that the castle grounds would make a perfect location for an adaptation of Shakespeare's As You Like It. By the time he had returned to London, his idea had grown considerably, and he now envisioned a series devoted exclusively to the dramatic work of Shakespeare; a series which would adapt all thirty-seven Shakespearean plays.

Almost immediately upon pitching the idea to his colleagues, however, Messina began to encounter problems. He had anticipated that everyone in the BBC would be excited about the concept, but this did not prove so. In particular, the Drama/Plays division felt the series could not possibly be a financial success without international sales, which they did not see as likely. Furthermore, they argued that Shakespeare on television rarely worked, and they thought that there was simply no need to do all thirty-seven plays, as many were obscure and would not find an audience amongst the general public, even in the UK. Disappointed with their lack of enthusiasm, Messina went over the departmental heads, forwarding his proposal directly to Director of Programmes Alasdair Milne and Director-General Ian Trethowan, both of whom liked the idea. Although there were still reservations within the BBC, and Messina's decision to bypass the accepted hierarchy would not be forgotten, with the support of Milne and Trethowan, the series was greenlit, with its daunting scope championed as part of its appeal; "it was a grand project, no one else could do it, no one else would do it, but it ought to be done." Writing several months into production, journalist Henry Fenwick wrote the project was "gloriously British, gloriously BBC."

=== Shakespeare on the BBC ===
The BBC had screened many Shakespearean adaptations before, and by 1978, the only plays which they had not shown in specifically made-for-TV adaptations were Henry VIII, Pericles, Timon of Athens, Titus Andronicus and The Two Gentlemen of Verona. However, despite this level of experience, they had never produced anything on the scale of the Shakespeare Series. Exclusively made-for-television Shakespearean productions had commenced on 5 February 1937 with the live broadcast of Act 3, Scene 2 from As You Like It, directed by Robert Atkins, and starring Margaretta Scott as Rosalind and Ion Swinley as Orlando. Later that evening, the wooing scene from Henry V was broadcast, directed by George More O'Ferrall, and starring Henry Oscar as Henry and Yvonne Arnaud as Katherine. O'Ferrall would oversee numerous broadcasts of Shakespearean extracts over the course of 1937, including Mark Antony's funeral speech from Julius Caesar, with Henry Oscar as Antony (11 February), several scenes between Benedick and Beatrice from Much Ado About Nothing, featuring Henry Oscar and Margaretta Scott (also 11 February), several scenes between Macbeth and Lady Macbeth from Macbeth, starring Laurence Olivier and Judith Anderson (25 March), and a heavily truncated version of Othello, starring Baliol Holloway as Othello, Celia Johnson as Desdemona and D. A. Clarke-Smith as Iago (14 December).

Other 1937 productions included two different screenings of scenes from A Midsummer Night's Dream; one directed by Dallas Bower, starring Patricia Hilliard as Titania and Hay Petrie as Nick Bottom (18 February), the other an extract from Stephen Thomas's Regent's Park production, starring Alexander Knox as Oberon and Thea Holme as Titania, aired as part of the celebrations for Shakespeare's birthday (23 April). 1937 also saw the broadcast of the wooing scene from Richard III, directed by Stephen Thomas, and starring Ernest Milton as Richard and Beatrix Lehmann as Lady Anne (9 April). In 1938, the first full-length broadcast of a Shakespearean play took place; Dallas Bower's modern dress production of Julius Caesar at the Shakespeare Memorial Theatre, starring D.A. Clark-Smith as Mark Antony and Ernest Milton as Caesar (24 July). The following year saw the first feature length made-for-TV production; The Tempest, also directed by Bower, and starring John Abbott as Prospero and Peggy Ashcroft as Miranda (5 February). The vast majority of these transmissions were broadcast live, and they came to an end with the onset of war in 1939. None of them survive.

After the war, Shakespearean adaptations were screened less frequently and tended to be more 'significant' specifically made-for-TV productions. In 1947, for example, O'Ferrall directed a two-part adaptation of Hamlet, starring John Byron as Hamlet, Sebastian Shaw as Claudius and Margaret Rawlings as Gertrude (5 & 15 December). Other post war productions included Richard II, directed by Royston Morley, and starring Alan Wheatley as Richard and Clement McCallin as Bolingbroke (29 October 1950); Henry V, again directed by Morley, and starring Clement McCallin as Henry and Olaf Pooley as The Dauphin (22 April 1951); an original Sunday Night Theatre production of The Taming of the Shrew, directed by Desmond Davis, and starring Margaret Johnston as Katherina and Stanley Baker as Petruchio (20 April 1952); a TV version of John Barton's Elizabethan Theatre Company production of Henry V, starring Colin George as Henry and Michael David as The Dauphin (19 May 1953); a Sunday Night Theatre live performance of Lionel Harris's musical production of The Comedy of Errors, starring David Pool as Antipholus of Ephesus and Paul Hansard as Antipholus of Syracuse (16 May 1954); and The Life of Henry the Fifth, the inaugural programme of BBC's new World Theatre series, directed by Peter Dews, and starring John Neville as Henry and John Wood as The Dauphin (29 December 1957).

There were also four multi-part made-for-TV Shakespearean adaptations shown during the 1950s and 1960s; three specifically conceived as TV productions, one a TV adaptation of a stage production. The first was The Life and Death of Sir John Falstaff (1959). Produced and directed by Ronald Eyre, and starring Roger Livesey as Falstaff, the series took all of the Falstaff scenes from the Henriad and adapted them into seven thirty-minute episodes. The second was An Age of Kings (1960). Produced by Peter Dews and directed by Michael Hayes, the show comprised fifteen episodes between sixty and eighty minutes each, which adapted all eight of Shakespeare's sequential history plays (Richard II, 1 Henry IV, 2 Henry IV, Henry V, 1 Henry VI, 2 Henry VI, 3 Henry VI and Richard III). The third was The Spread of the Eagle (1963), directed and produced by Dews. Featuring nine sixty-minute episodes, the series adapted the Roman plays, in chronological order of the real-life events depicted; Coriolanus, Julius Caesar and Antony and Cleopatra. The fourth series was a made-for-TV restaging of a stage production; The Wars of the Roses, which was screened in both 1965 and 1966. The Wars of the Roses was a three-part adaptation of Shakespeare's first historical tetralogy (1 Henry VI, 2 Henry VI, 3 Henry VI and Richard III) which had been staged to great critical and commercial success at the Royal Shakespeare Theatre in 1963, adapted by John Barton, and directed by Barton and Peter Hall. At the end of its run, the production was remounted for TV, shot on the Royal Shakespeare Theatre stage, using the same set as the theatrical production, but not during live performances. Directed for television by Michael Hayes and Robin Midgley, it originally aired in 1965 as a three-parter, just as the plays had been staged (the three parts were called Henry VI, Edward IV and Richard III). Due to the popularity of the 1965 broadcast, the series was again screened in 1966, with the three plays divided up into ten episodes of fifty minutes each.

Although An Age of Kings, which was the most expensive and ambitious Shakespearean production up to that point, was a critical and commercial success, The Spread of the Eagle was not, and afterwards, the BBC decided to return to smaller-scale productions with less financial risk. In 1964, for example, they screened a live performance of Clifford Williams's Royal Shakespeare Company (RSC) production of The Comedy of Errors from the Aldwych Theatre, starring Ian Richardson as Antipholus of Ephesus and Alec McCowen as Antipholus of Syracuse. 1964 also saw the broadcast of Hamlet at Elsinore, directed by Philip Saville and produced by Peter Luke. Starring Christopher Plummer as Hamlet, Robert Shaw as Claudius and June Tobin as Gertrude, the entire play was shot on-location in Helsingør at the real Elsinore Castle. In 1970, they screened The Tragedy of Richard II, sourced from Richard Cottrell's touring production, and starring Ian McKellen as Richard and Timothy West as Bolingbroke.

Additionally, the Play of the Month series had screened several Shakespearean adaptations over the years; Romeo and Juliet (1967), The Tempest (1968), Julius Caesar (1969), Macbeth (1970), A Midsummer Night's Dream (1971), The Merchant of Venice (1972), King Lear (1975) and Love's Labour's Lost (1975).

=== Funding ===
The BBC Television Shakespeare project was the most ambitious engagement with Shakespeare ever undertaken by either a television or film production company. The total budget was initially announced at £7 million, or USD$13.6 million. It was later reported to be closer to USD$16 million. After overall costs, each production had a budget of approximately USD$325,000. So large was the project that the BBC could not finance it alone, requiring a North American partner who could guarantee access to the United States market, deemed essential for the series to recoup its costs. In their efforts to source this funding, the BBC met with some initial good luck. Cedric Messina's script editor, Alan Shallcross, was the cousin of Denham Challender, executive officer of the New York branch of Morgan Guaranty Trust. Challender knew that Morgan were looking to underwrite a public arts endeavour, and he suggested the Shakespeare series to his superiors. Morgan contacted the BBC, and a deal was quickly reached. However, Morgan was only willing to invest about one-third of what was needed (approximately £1.5 million/$3.6 million). Securing the rest of the necessary funding took the BBC considerably longer – almost three years.

Exxon were the next to invest, offering another third of the budget in 1976. The following year, Time Life, the BBC's US distributor, was contacted by the Corporation for Public Broadcasting (CPB) about possible investment in the project. However, because CPB used public funding, its interest in the series caught the attention of US labour unions and theatre professionals, who objected to the idea of US money subsidising British programming. The American Federation of Television and Radio Artists (AFTRA) and the American Federation of Labor and Congress of Industrial Organizations (AFL-CIO) began to put pressure on CPB not to invest in the series. Joseph Papp, director of the New York Shakespeare Festival, was particularly aghast, arguing that US television could do the entire canon for TV just as easily as the BBC, and publicly urging CPB not to invest. Before the situation came to a head, however, the necessary third investor was found, Metropolitan Life. Their investment meant that with the $5.5 million invested by the BBC, plus the money from Morgan and Exxon, the project was fully funded.

The complexity of this funding is indicated by the general opening credits for the US screening of each episode; "The series is made possible by grants from Exxon, Metropolitan Life, and Morgan Bank. It is a BBC-TV and Time/Life television co-production, presented for the Public Broadcasting Service by WNET/Thirteen, New York." According to Jac Venza, executive producer at WNET, "it was one of the few times that we got three separate corporate funders to agree to funding something six years into the future. That was in itself a kind of extraordinary feat."

=== Rejected plans ===
One of Messina's earliest decisions regarding the series was to hire a literary advisor; Professor John Wilders of Worcester College, Oxford. Wilders initially wanted the shows to work from completely new texts re-edited from the various quartos, octavos and folios specifically for the productions, but when the time necessary for this proved impractical, Wilders decided instead to use Peter Alexander's 1951 edition of the Complete Works as the series "bible."

Messina envisioned the series as having six seasons of six episodes each, the plan being to adapt the three Henry VI plays into a two-part episode. This idea was quickly rejected, however, as it was felt to be an unacceptable compromise and it was instead decided to simply have one season with seven episodes. Initially, Messina toyed with the idea of shooting the plays in the chronological order of their composition, but this plan was abandoned because it was felt that doing so would necessitate the series beginning with a run of relatively little known plays, not to mention the fact that there is no definitive chronology. Instead, Messina, Wilders and Shallcross decided that the first season would comprise some of the better-known comedies (Much Ado About Nothing and As You Like It) and tragedies (Romeo & Juliet and Julius Caesar). Measure for Measure was selected as the season's "obscure" play, and King Richard the Second was included to begin the eight-part sequence of history plays. When the production of the inaugural episode, Much Ado About Nothing, was abandoned after it had been shot, it was replaced by The Famous History of the Life of King Henry the Eight as the sixth episode of the season.

Almost immediately, however, the concept for the historical octology ran into trouble. Messina had wanted to shoot the eight sequential history plays in chronological order of the events they depicted, with linked casting and the same director for all eight adaptations (David Giles), with the sequence spread out over the entire six-season run. During the early planning stages for King Richard the Second and The First Part of King Henry the Fourth, however, the plan for linked casting fell apart, when it was discovered that although Jon Finch (Henry Bolingbroke in Richard) could return as Henry IV, Jeremy Bulloch as Hotspur and David Swift as the Earl of Northumberland were unable to do so, and the parts would have to be recast, thus undermining the concept of shooting the plays as one sequence. Ultimately, during the first season, King Richard the Second, although still directed by Giles, was treated as a stand-alone piece, while The First Part of King Henry the Fourth, The Second Part of King Henry the Fourth and The Life of Henry the Fifth (all also directed by Giles) were treated as a trilogy during the second season, with linked casting between them. Additionally, in an attempt to establish a connection with the first season's Richard, Jon Finch returned as Henry IV, and The First Part of King Henry the Fourth opened with the murder of Richard from the previous play. The second set of four plays were then directed by Jane Howell as one unit, with a common set and linked casting, airing during the fifth season.

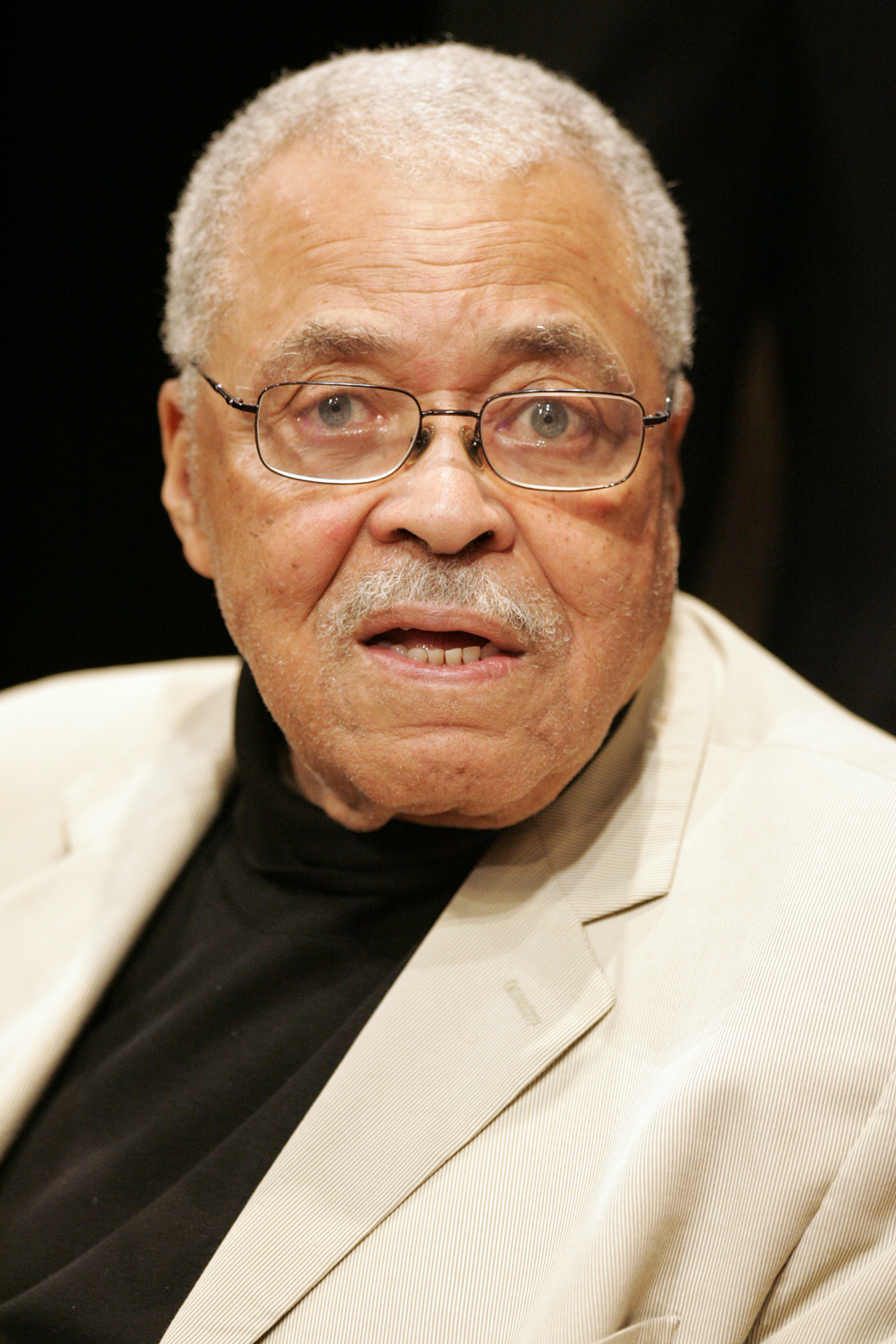
James Earl Jones. When Cedric Messina attempted to cast Jones as Othello, Equity threatened to strike, as they wanted only British and Irish performers to appear in the shows.

Another early idea, which never came to fruition, was the concept of forming a single repertory acting company to perform all thirty-seven plays. Before the plan could be put into practice, the British Actors' Equity Association blocked the proposal, arguing that as many of its members as possible should get the chance to appear in the series. They also wrote into their contract with the BBC that only British and Irish actors could be cast. During the planning for season two, when it came to their attention that Messina was trying to cast James Earl Jones as Othello, Equity threatened to have their members strike, thus crippling the series. This forced Messina to abandon the casting of Jones, and Othello was pushed back to a later season.

=== UK publicity ===
Prior to the screening of the first episode, UK publicity for the series was extensive, with virtually every department at the BBC involved. Once the series had begun, a major aspect of the publicity campaign involved previews of each episode for the press prior to its public broadcast, so reviews could appear before the episode aired; the idea being that good reviews might get people to watch who otherwise would not. Other publicity 'events' included a party to celebrate the commencement of the third season, at The George Inn, Southwark, near the site of the Globe Theatre, and a similar party at the start of the sixth season, in Glamis Castle, which was attended by Ian Hogg, Alan Howard, Joss Ackland, Tyler Butterworth, Wendy Hiller, Patrick Ryecart and Cyril Cusack, all of whom were on hand for interviews by the many invited journalists.

Another major aspect of the promotional work was supplementary educational material. For example, the BBC had their books division issue the scripts for each episode, prepared by script editor Alan Shallcross (seasons 1 and 2) and David Snodin (seasons 3 and 4) and edited by John Wilders. Each publication included a general introduction by Wilders, an essay on the production itself by Henry Fenwick, interviews with the cast and crew, photographs, a glossary, and annotations on textual alterations by Shallcross, and subsequently Snodin, with explanations as to why certain cuts had been made. The Fenwick essays were published as feature articles in the Radio Times in the week of each production.

As well as the published annotated scripts, the BBC also produced two complementary shows designed to help viewers engage with the plays on a more scholarly level; the radio series Prefaces to Shakespeare and the TV series Shakespeare in Perspective. Prefaces was a series of thirty-minute shows focused on the performance history of each play, with commentary provided by an actor who had performed the play in the past. The actor would discuss the general stage history, as well as their own experiences working on the play, with each episode airing on BBC Radio 4 one to three nights prior to the screening of the actual episode on BBC 2.

The TV supplement, Shakespeare in Perspective, was a more generally educational show, with each twenty-five-minute episode dealing with various aspects of the production, hosted by various well-known figures, who, generally speaking, were not involved in Shakespeare per se. Aired on BBC 2 the night before the transmission of the show itself, the main intention of the series was "to enlighten a new audience for Shakespeare on television, attract people to the plays and give them some background material. [The presenters] encapsulated the stories of the plays, provided an historical framework, where feasible, and offer some original thoughts which might intrigue those already familiar with the text." The level of scholarship was purposely gauged for O and A-level exams, with presenters writing their own scripts. However, the series sometimes ran into trouble. For the show on Hamlet, Prince of Denmark, for example, when the crew turned up to shoot, the presenter stated simply, "This is one of the silliest plays ever written, and I have nothing to say about it." This prompted a hastily organised program hosted by Clive James.

The biggest problem with Shakespeare in Perspective, however, and the one most frequently commented upon in reviews, was that the presenter of each episode had not seen the production about which he/she was speaking, and often, there was a disparity between their remarks and the interpretation offered by the show. For example, poet Stephen Spender's comments about The Winter's Tale being a play of great beauty which celebrates the cycles of nature seemed at odds with Jane Howell's semi-stylised single-set production, where a lone tree was used to represent the change in seasons. The most commented upon example of this disparity was in relation to Cymbeline, which was hosted by playwright and screenwriter Dennis Potter. In his review for The Observer of both the production and the Perspective show, Julian Barnes wrote "several furlongs understandably separate the left hand of the BBC from the right one. Only rarely, though, do we witness such a cameo of intermanual incomprehension as occurred last week within their Shakespeare cycle: the right hand seizing a hammer and snappishly nailing the left hand to the arm of the chair." Barnes points out that clearly, Potter had not seen the show when recording his commentary. He was correct; Potter's Perspective had been recorded before Cymbeline had even been shot. According to Barnes,

Potter was first discovered lurking among the mossy rocks and echoing grottoes of the Forest of Dean, fit backdrop, he explained, to introduce a play full of "the stonily mysterious landscapes of both my own childhood and all our fairytale-ridden memories." He urged us lullingly into the world of dream: "Cast your mind back to the dusky evenings of childhood. Your eyelids are drooping [...] the warm, cosy house is preparing itself to drift off, unanchored, into the night [...] the realm of once upon a time." Megaliths and memory, ferns and faerie: such was the world of Cymbeline. Elijah Moshinsky, the director, obviously hadn't heard. Faerie was out; rocks were off; stonily mysterious landscapes could get stuffed. Ancient Britain in the reign of Augustus Caesar became a foppish 17th-century court, with nods to Rembrandt, Van Dyck and (when Helen Mirren was caught in a certain light and a certain dress) Vermeer. The fairytale Mr Potter had promised became a play of court intrigue and modern passion: a sort of offcut from Othello.

=== US publicity ===
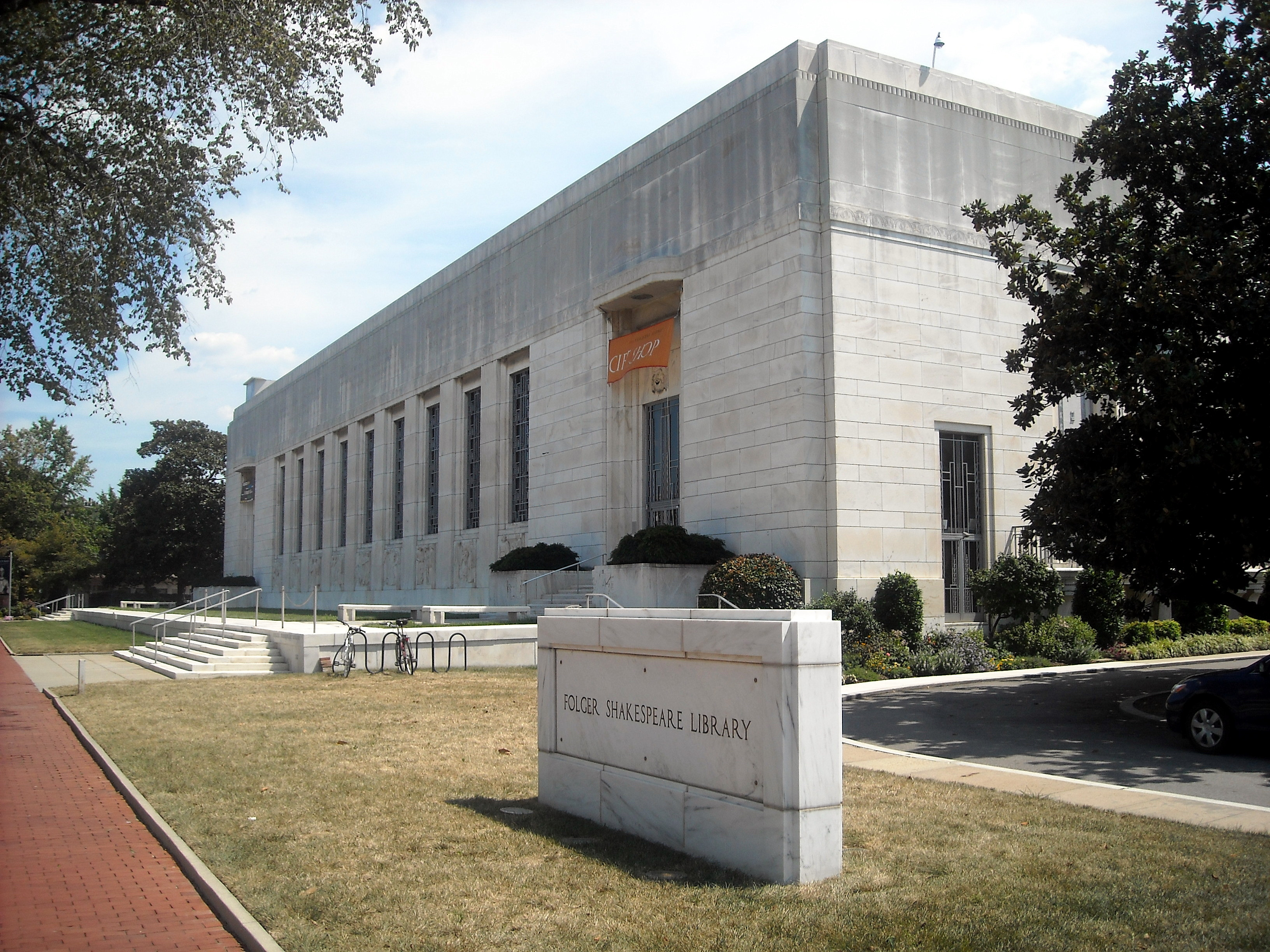
The Folger Shakespeare Library was heavily involved in promoting the show in the United States.

In the US, the BBC hired Stone/Hallinan Associates to handle publicity. However, because the show aired on public television, many US newspapers and magazines did not cover it. To launch the show in the US, a reception was held at the White House, attended by Rosalynn Carter, followed by lunch at the Folger Shakespeare Library. The main representative was Anthony Quayle, who had been cast as Falstaff for the second season Henry the Fourth episodes. It also helped that, unlike many of the other actors appearing in early episodes, Quayle was well-known in the US. Also in attendance were Richard Pasco, Celia Johnson, Patrick Ryecart and Helen Mirren. James Earl Jones was initially scheduled to appear, in anticipation of the second season production of Othello, but by the time of the reception, Messina had been forced to abandon casting him. In the weeks leading up to the premier, Stone/Hallinan sent out press kits for each episode, while Exxon produced TV and radio commercials, MetLife held Shakespearean open days in its head office, and sent out posters and viewer guides for each episode.

In the US, WNET planned a series of thirty-minute programs to act as general introductions to each episode. This created something of a media circus when they (half) jokingly asked Joseph Papp if he would be interested in hosting it. Ultimately, however, they abandoned the idea and simply aired the BBC's Shakespeare in Perspective episodes. In terms of radio publicity, in 1979, National Public Radio (NPR) aired Shakespeare Festival; a series of operas and music programs based on Shakespeare's plays, as well as a two-hour docudrama, William Shakespeare: A Portrait in Sound, written and directed by William Luce, and starring Julie Harris and David Warner. They also broadcast a lecture series from the Lincoln Center, featuring Samuel Schoenbaum, Maynard Mack and Daniel Seltzer. Additionally, NPR station WQED-FM aired half-hour introductions to each play the week before the TV broadcast of the episode. However, when the early episodes of the show did not achieve the kind of ratings which had been initially hoped, financing for publicity quickly dried up; a Shakespeare variety show planned for PBS in 1981, set to star Charlton Heston, Robin Williams, Richard Chamberlain and Chita Rivera, failed to find an underwriter and was cancelled. The Folger Shakespeare Library's Shakespeare: The Globe and the World, a multimedia touring exhibition, was more successful and travelled to cities all over the country for the first two seasons of the show.

Much as the UK promotional efforts by the BBC focused at least partially on education, so too did US publicity, where the underwriters spent as much on the educational material as they did on underwriting the series itself. The job of handling the US educational outreach program was given to Tel-Ed, a subsidiary of Stone/Hallinan. Educational efforts were focused on middle school and high school, which is when US students first encounter Shakespeare. Tel-Ed had a three-pronged goal; to make students familiar with more plays (most schools taught only Romeo and Juliet, Julius Caesar and Macbeth), to encourage students to enjoy Shakespeare, and to have Shakespeare taught more frequently. Tel-Ed's aim was to make the entire series available to every high school in the US. During the first season, they sent out 36,000 educational packs to English departments, receiving 18,000 requests for further information. The educational aspect of the series was considered such a success that when the show went off the air in 1985, Morgan Bank continued with educational efforts, creating The Shakespeare Hour in 1986. The concept of the show was that episodes of the BBC Television Shakespeare would be presented specifically as educational tools. Planned as a three-year show with five episodes per year over a fifteen-week season, the series would group plays together thematically. Walter Matthau was hired as host, and each episode featured documentary material intercut with extensive clips from the BBC productions themselves. A book was also published with the full transcript of each episode; The Shakespeare Hour: A Companion to the PBS-TV Series, edited by Edward Quinn. In all, the first season cost $650,000, but everyone expected it to be a success. Covering the theme of love, it used A Midsummer Night's Dream, Twelfth Night, All's Well That Ends Well, Measure for Measure and King Lear. However, the show achieved very poor ratings and was cancelled at the end of the first season. The second season had been set to cover power (King Richard the Second, The First Part of King Henry the Fourth, The Tragedy of Richard III, The Taming of the Shrew, Macbeth and Julius Caesar), with the third looking at revenge (The Merchant of Venice, Hamlet, Prince of Denmark, The Winter's Tale, The Tempest and Othello).

=== Scheduling ===
Given the scope of the series, the BBC was conscious of the uphill challenge to keep audience numbers, and intended to be rigorous with the show's schedule. The original intention was to broadcast each season in two sections: three weekly broadcasts in late winter, followed by a short break, and then three weekly broadcasts in early spring. This would maximise marketing in the lead-up to Christmas, and capitalise on the traditionally quiet period in early spring. All episodes of the first season followed this pattern, broadcast on BBC 2 on a Sunday, and all began at eight o'clock, with a five-minute interval around 9 for News on 2 and a weather report. The second season, however, faced delays in the spring scheduling, partly because Hamlet was delayed by Derek Jacobi's schedule.

Moving into the third season, under Jonathan Miller's producership, many critics noticed that the scheduling was more random. The third season aired six instalments across eight months, none in consecutive weeks. The fourth season aired only three episodes in total over three months. The fifth season, under Shaun Sutton, aired six instalments over five months, although the first historical tetralogy—which had been taped as a sequence—aired in consecutive weeks. The sixth season aired five instalments over ten months, while season seven aired entirely on Saturdays, with four plays airing in the space of seven weeks, and then Titus Andronicus, delayed by a BBC strike, a few months later.

US scheduling faced more complexities. In the UK, each episode could start at any time and run for any length without any major problems, because shows are not trimmed to fit slots; rather slots are arranged to fit shows. In the US, however, TV worked on very rigid time slots; a show could not run, say, 138 minutes, it must run either 120 or 150 minutes to fit into the existing slot. Additionally, whereas the BBC included an intermission of five minutes roughly halfway through each show, PBS had to have an intermission every sixty minutes. Several of the shows in the first season left 'gaps' in the US time slots of almost twenty minutes, which had to be filled with something. In seasons one and two, any significant time gaps at the end of a show were filled by Renaissance music performed by the Waverly Consort. When Jonathan Miller took over as producer at the end of the second season, WNET suggested something different; each episode should have a two-minute introduction, followed by interviews with the director and a cast member at the end of the episode, which would be edited to run the length necessary to plug the gaps. However, moving into season five, WNET had no money left to record any more introductions or interviews, and the only alternative was to cut the episodes to fit the time slots, much to the BBC's chagrin. The productions that caused the most trouble were Jane Howell's Henry VI/Richard III series. Running a total of fourteen hours, WNET felt that airing the shows in four straight back-to-back segments would not work. First, they changed the schedule to air the episodes on Sunday afternoon as opposed to the usual Monday evening screening, then they divided the three Henry VI plays into two parts each. Finally, they cut a total of 77 minutes from the three productions (35 were taken from The Third Part of Henry the Sixt alone). To help trim The First Part of Henry the Sixt, much early dialogue was cut, and instead a voice-over introduction recorded, ironically, by James Earl Jones was added, informing viewers of the necessary backstory. However, The Tragedy of Richard III (the longest of the four) was aired as one piece, with only 3 minutes cut.

=== Production ===
==== Early restrictions ====
Because the US investors had put up so much money for the project, the backers were able to write aesthetic guidelines into the contract. However, as most of these guidelines conformed to Messina's vision of the series anyway ("to make solid, basic televised versions of Shakespeare's plays to reach a wide television audience and to enhance the teaching of Shakespeare"), they created no major problems. The most important of these stipulations was that the productions must be "traditional" interpretations of the plays set in either Shakespeare's time (1564 to 1616) or in the period of the events depicted (such as ancient Rome for Julius Caesar or c.1400 for Richard II). A two-and-a-half-hour maximum running time was also mandated, although this was soon jettisoned when it became clear that the major tragedies in particular would suffer if truncated too heavily. The initial way around this was to split the longer plays into two sections, showing them on separate nights, but this idea was also discarded, and it was agreed that for the major plays, length was not an overly important issue.

The restriction regarding conservative, traditional interpretations was non-negotiable, however. The financiers were primarily concerned with ratings, and the restrictions worked to this end, ensuring the plays had "maximum acceptability to the widest possible audience." However, as practical a stipulation as this was, such decisions "demonstrate that far more concern was spent on financial matters than on interpretative or aesthetic issues in planning the series." Messina himself, however, had no problem with any of these restrictions, as they conformed to his initial vision; "we've not done anything too sensational in the shooting of it – there's no arty-crafty shooting at all. All of them are, for want of a better word, straightforward productions."

These restrictions had a practical origin, but they soon led to a degree of aesthetic fallout;

the underwriters simply proposed to disseminate the plays widely for cultural and educational benefit. Many people, they hoped, might see Shakespeare performed for the first time in the televised series, a point Messina emphasised repeatedly; others would doubtless recite the lines along with the actors [...] Consequently, expectations and criteria for judgement would either be virtually non-existent or quite high [...] Did it matter how good the productions were so long as they were "acceptable" by some standards – audience share, critical reception, or overseas sales? Being acceptable is not always synonymous with being good, however, and initially, the goal seems to have been the former, with a few forays into the latter.

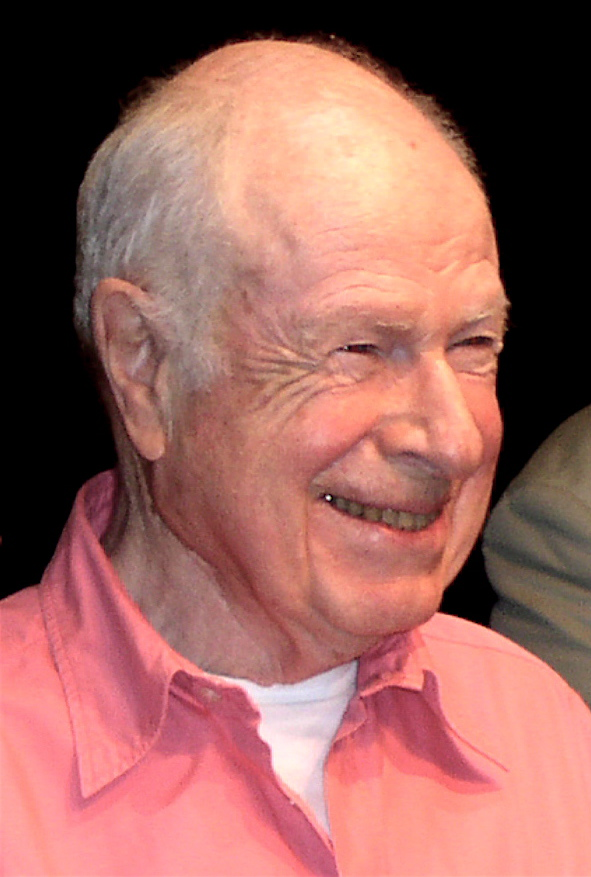
Peter Brook was uninterested in directing an episode of the show when Jonathan Miller offered him the opportunity.

The series developed a reputation in some quarters for being overly conventional. As a result, when Miller would later try to persuade celebrated directors such as Peter Brook, Ingmar Bergman, William Gaskill and John Dexter to direct adaptations, he would fail. Reviewing the first two seasons of the series for Critical Quarterly, in an article entitled "BBC Television's Dull Shakespeares," Martin Banham quoted from a publicity extract written by Messina in which he stated, "there has been no attempt at stylisation, there are no gimmicks; no embellishments to confuse the student." Banham opined that some of the best recent theatrical productions have been extremely "gimmicky" in the sense of "adventurous," whereas the opening two episodes of the series were simply "unimaginative" and more concerned with visual "prettiness" than dramatic quality.

In light of criticism about the conservative nature of the early productions, Jac Venza defended the strictures, pointing out that the BBC was aiming to make programs with a long life span; they were not a theatre company producing a single run of plays for an audience already familiar with those plays, who would value novelty and innovation. They were making TV adaptations of plays for an audience the vast majority of whom would be unfamiliar with most of the material. Venza pointed out that many of the critics who most vehemently attacked the show's traditional and conservative nature were those who were regular theatregoers and/or Shakespearean scholars, and who were essentially asking for something the BBC never intended to produce. They wanted to reach a wide audience and get more people interested in Shakespeare, and as such, novelty and experimentation were not part of the plan, a decision Venza calls "very sensible."

==== In production ====
After five weeks of pre-planning and a pre-production week for the director and design team, the actors would rehearse for four weeks, working five or six days a week from 10am to 4pm. Sir John Gielgud noted that one of the challenges in rehearsing Shakespeare was that the style of performance required was very different to television: "the least flicker of an eyelash ... will carry for television where it couldn't for stage". Costume designers had around two months per play to research, design, and create the necessary costumes, including recycling or adapting existing material from the BBC costume warehouse. The production would then move to the BBC studio for a technical run. Taping would take place over a series of eleven-hour days, which included all camera rehearsals and set-ups. The BBC expectation was that each day would lead to thirty minutes of content being recorded. The editing for The Comedy of Errors, one of the shorter plays, took six days. John Russell Brown, literary manager of The National Theatre, believed that the rehearsal timeframe, without the long run of a theatrical run to sharpen character development, necessarily led to superficial performances. "It's very foolish to think that in a few weeks' rehearsal you'll get Shakespearean performances from an ad hoc company sufficiently good to bear scrutiny from a camera".

The multi-camera format provided its own methods for directors to express their interpretation via the camera movement and framing. Hardy M. Cook compared Jonathan Miller's King Lear for this series with the 1983 version directed by Michael Elliott in a single-camera style. Cook notes that, in the opening scene, when Gloucester and Kent discuss Gloucester's illegitimate son Edmund, Miller places Edmund in the frame but further from the camera: "the first of innumerable triangular blocking patterns in this scene". Whereas Elliott cuts to Edmund when he wants to show the character's reaction to his father's words, Miller can use the framing to establish "relationships within the frame rather than between frames". Once Lear and his court enter the scene, Cook argues that Elliott's use of montage "denies us the simultaneous impact of Shakespeare's language upon all the major characters in the frame ... and the choice of where to direct our attention". By contrast, Miller has the actors moving in relation to the camera over a long take, moving to one another and forming patterns that are captured in full; Miller's blocking "is a visual essay on the shifting relationships among the characters". Another benefit of television was the ability for techniques such as the close-up to clarify information for new viewers. In Richard II, for example, a theatre audience would require a footnote to understand that King Richard may be responsible for the death of Thomas of Woodstock, which is the implied subtext of the opening scene. On screen, "a sudden cut to Derek Jacobi's face when Woodstock is mentioned settles the matter for all viewers".

==== Seasons 1 and 2 (Cedric Messina, producer) ====
Messina's initial aesthetic concept for the series was realism, especially in terms of the sets, which were to be as naturally representational as possible. This was based upon what Messina knew of TV audiences and their expectations. His opinion, supported by many of his staff, was that the majority of the audience would not be regular theatregoers who would respond to stylisation or innovation. Speaking of the Romeo & Juliet set, Henry Fenwick notes that

Both [director] Rakoff and Messina were sure that the play should be staged as naturalistically as possible. "You have to see a proper ballroom, a balcony, the garden, the piazza," Messina insisted. "In order to grab the audience's attention, you've got to do it as realistically as possible," Rakoff stresses. "You're asking the audience to do a hell of a thing; the most real medium in the world is television; they're watching the news at nine o'clock and they're seeing real blood and suddenly we're saying 'Come to our pretend violence.' I've done stylised productions before, and it takes the audience a hell of a long time to get with you. You could do Romeo & Juliet against white or black drapes but I think you'd alienate a hell of a lot of the potential viewers. I would love to have tried to do Romeo outside in a Verona town somewhere.

Indeed, two of the first-season episodes were recorded on location; As You Like It in and around Glamis Castle, and The Famous History of the Life of King Henry the Eight in three different castles in Kent.

Sets varied throughout the series. Both of the initial episodes, Romeo & Juliet and King Richard the Second, featured obviously fake, newly constructed studio-bound sets which were criticised by some reviewers for failing to achieve any sense of lived-in reality; "such half-realism repeatedly belies the very verisimilitude that was its goal." Other productions adopted more naturalistic design approach, such as Twelfth Night, The Merry Wives of Windsor and Cymbeline, all of which feature "a credible studio verisimilitude of exteriors, of places that work like filming on location rather than in a somewhat realistic stage or studio set." John Wilders preferred the "fake realism" of the first plays, which he felt were "much more satisfactory than location work because the deliberate artificiality of the scenery works in harmony with the conventions of the plays. Unfortunately, it may create the impression that we have tried to build realistic sets but have failed for want of skill or money." When Jonathan Miller took over as producer at the start of season three, realism ceased to be a design priority.

The inaugural episode was set to be Much Ado About Nothing, directed by Donald McWhinnie, and starring Penelope Keith and Michael York. The episode was shot (costing £250,000), edited and even publicly announced as the opening of the series before it was suddenly pulled from the schedule and replaced with Romeo & Juliet (which was supposed to air as the second episode). No reasons were given by the BBC for this decision. Initial newspaper reports suggested that the episode had been postponed for re-shoots, due to an unspecified actor's "very heavy accent," and concerns that US audiences would not be able to understand the dialogue. However the production was never aired, and would be replaced with a new production entirely in the seventh season. Internal BBC documentation suggests that BBC management simply regarded the production as a failure. This issue, happening as it did at the very commencement of the series, would have lasting repercussions;

the actual cause of the problem apparently stemmed from internal politics, an internecine struggle focused on Messina rather than on the show, its director, or the performers, a struggle that left lasting scars. While Messina was the man to plan the series, it seemed he was not the man to produce it. He was part of too many power struggles; too many directors would not work for him; he proceeded with too many of the traditional production habits. The battle over Much Ado was actually a battle over power and the producership; once Messina lost and the show was cancelled, his tenure as producer was jeopardized.

Another early problem for Messina was that the US publicity campaign for the show had touted the productions as "definitive" adaptations of Shakespeare's plays, prompting much criticism from theatre professionals, filmmakers and academics. The claim that the show would feature "definitive" productions was often raised and attacked by the US media during its seven-year run, especially when an episode did not live up to expectations. Future producers Miller and Sutton would routinely disagree with the use of the word "definitive" to describe their productions, with Miller saying "One is not producing the definitive version of Shakespeare. We are presenting interesting experiments".

From a practical point of view, during his tenure as producer, Messina was not overly involved in the actual taping of each episode. While he chose the director and assisted in the principal casting, the director was responsible for the major aesthetic decisions: camera placement and movement, blocking, production design, costumes, music and editing.

Messina's legacy regarding the BBC Television Shakespeare has been seen as something of a mixed bag; "what the initial Messina years cost the series in tensions, alienations, and lack of fresh thought or vigorous technical/aesthetic planning it would never recover. That we have the televised Shakespeare series at all is entirely due to Messina; that we have the Shakespeare series we have and not perhaps a better, more exciting one is also in large part due to Messina."

==== Seasons 3 and 4 (Jonathan Miller, producer) ====
When Jonathan Miller took over at the start of season three, he instituted a new title sequence and replaced William Walton's theme music with a newly composed piece by Stephen Oliver. Miller's changes went much deeper, however. Whereas Messina had favoured a realism-based approach, which worked to simplify the texts for audiences unfamiliar with Shakespeare, Miller was against any kind of aesthetic or intellectual dilution. Messina's theory was based on his many years of experience in television, and according to Martin Wiggins, it was exactly Miller's lack of such experience that led to his aesthetic overhaul of the show; Miller came from

outside the BBC's tradition of painstaking research and accurate historical verisimilitude [...] Messina's approach had treated the plays in realistic terms as events which had once taken place and which could be literally represented on screen. Miller saw them as products of a creative imagination, artefacts in their own right to be realised in production using the visual and conceptual materials of their period. This led to a major reappraisal of the original production guidelines.

Susan Willis makes a similar point; "instead of doing what the BBC usually did, Miller saw the series as a means of examining the limits of televised drama, of seeing what the medium could do; it was an imaginative, creative venture." Miller was in many ways the polar opposite of Messina;

if the Messina productions were predominantly set in the historical periods referred to, Miller's were insistently Renaissance in dress and attitude. If television was supposed to be based on realism, Miller took the productions straight into the visual arts of the period. If most earlier productions had been visually filmic, Miller emphasized the theatrical. If the previous interpretations were basically solid and straightforward, Miller encouraged stronger, sharper renditions, cutting across the grain, vivid and not always mainstream.

Miller himself stated "I think it's very unwise to try to represent on the television screen something which Shakespeare did not have in his mind's eye when he wrote those lines. You have to find some counterpart of the unfurnished stage that Shakespeare wrote for without, in fact, necessarily reproducing a version of the Globe theatre. Because there's no way in which you can do that [...] What details you do introduce must remind the audience of the sixteenth century imagination." For Miller, the best way to do this was by using the work of famous artists as visual inspiration and reference points;

it's the director's job, quite apart from working with actors and getting subtle and energetic performances out of them, to act as the chairman of a history faculty and of an art-history faculty. Here was a writer who was immersed in the themes and notions of his time. The only way in which you can unlock that imagination is to immerse yourself in the themes in which he was immersed. And the only way you can do that is by looking at the pictures which reflect the visual world of which he was a part and to acquaint yourself with the political and social issues with which he was preoccupied – trying, in some way, to identify yourself with the world which was his.

On this subject, Susan Willis writes,

Miller had a vision of Shakespeare as an Elizabethan/Jacobean playwright, as a man of his time in social, historical, and philosophical outlook. The productions Miller himself directed reflect this belief most clearly of course, but he also evoked such an awareness in the other directors. If there was not to be a single stylistic "signature" to the plays under Miller's producership, there was more nearly an attitudinal one. Everything was reflexive for the Renaissance artist, Miller felt, most especially historical references, and so Antony of Rome, Cleopatra of Egypt and both Timon and Theseus of Athens take on a familiar late sixteenth and early seventeenth-century manner and look.

As this indicates, Miller adopted a visual and design policy of sets and costumes inspired by great paintings of the era in which the plays were written, although the style was dominated by the post-Shakespearean 17th-century artists Vermeer and Rembrandt. In this sense, "art provides not just a look in Miller's productions; it provided a mode of being, a redolence of the air breathed in that world, an intellectual climate in addition to a physical space." This policy allowed other directors to stamp more of their own aesthetic credo on the productions than had been possible under Messina. According to Miller himself,

when the BBC started to imagine [the] series, there was a notion of an 'authentic' Shakespeare: something that should be tampered with as little as possible, so that one could present to an innocent audience Shakespeare as it might have been before the over-imaginative director arrived on the scene. I think this was a misconception: the hypothetical version which they saw as being authentic was actually something remembered from thirty years before; and in itself presumably widely divergent from what was performed at the inaugural production four hundred years ago. I thought it was much better to acknowledge the open-ended creativity of any Shakespeare production, since there is no way of returning to an authentic Globe Theatre version [...] There are all sorts of unforeseeable meanings which might attach to the play, simply by virtue of the fact that it has survived into a period with which the author was not acquainted, and is therefore able to strike chords in the imagination of a modern audience which could not have been struck in an audience when it was first performed [...] the people who actually inaugurated the series seemed conspicuously unacquainted with what had happened to Shakespeare, didn't know the academic work, and actually had an old-fashioned show-biz hostility to the academic world [...] I was limited nonetheless by certain contractual requirements which had been established before I came on the scene with the American sponsors: there are however all sorts of ways of skinning that kind of cat, and even with the requirement that I had to set things in so-called traditional costume, there were liberties which they could not foresee, and which I was able to take.

Elijah Moshinsky assessed Miller's contribution to the series by arguing that "it was only Miller's appointment that pulled the series out of its artistic nosedive." Speaking of the US restrictions, Miller stated "the brief was "no monkey-tricks" – but I think monkey-tricks is at least 50 percent of what interesting directing is about [...] The fact is that monkey-tricks are only monkey-tricks when they don't work. A monkey-trick that comes off is a stroke of genius. If you start out with a quite comprehensive self-denying ordinance of "no monkey tricks," then you really are very much shackled." Similarly, speaking after he had stepped aside as producer at the end of the fourth season, Miller stated "I did what I wanted to do [...] The sponsors insisted that it was a traditional thing, that it didn't disturb people by bizarre setting. And I said, okay, fine, but, I'll disturb them with bizarre interpretations." Miller was not interested in stage tradition; he did not create a heroic Antony, a farcical Shrew or a sluttish Cressida. His Othello had little to do with race and his Lear was more of a family man than a regal titan. Miller himself spoke of his dislike for "canonical performances," stating "I think there is a conspiracy in the theatre to perpetuate certain prototypes in the belief that they contain the secret truth of the characters in question. This collusion between actors and directors is broken only by successful innovation which interrupts the prevailing mode."

The first episode shot under Miller's producership was Antony & Cleopatra (although the first to air would be The Taming of the Shrew), and it was in this episode, which he also directed, where he introduced his design policies, as he set about "permeating the design with the Renaissance view of the ancient world, for he observed that the Renaissance saw the classical world in terms of itself, with a contemporary rather than an archaeological awareness; they treated classical subjects but always dressed them anachronistically in Renaissance garments."

Miller's aesthetic freedom still faced limitations. When he hired Michael Bogdanov to direct Timon of Athens, Bogdanov proposed an Orient al-themed modern-dress production. The financiers refused to sanction the idea, and Miller had to insist Bogdanov remain within the aesthetic guidelines. This led to Bogdanov quitting, and Miller himself taking over as director. One aspect of Messina's producership which Miller did reproduce was the tendency not to get too involved in the actual shooting of the productions which he was not directing. After appointing a director and choosing a cast, he would make suggestions and be on hand to answer questions, but he believed that "the job of the producer is to make conditions as favourable and friendly as they possibly can be, so that [the directors'] imagination is given the best possible chance to work."

==== Seasons 5, 6 and 7 (Shaun Sutton, producer) ====
Whereas the BBC had looked for an outsider to inject fresh ideas into the project at the start of season three, they turned inwards once more in finding someone to bring the series to a conclusion; Shaun Sutton. Miller had rejuvenated the series aesthetically and his productions had saved its reputation with critics, but the show had fallen behind schedule, with Miller overseeing only nine episodes instead of twelve during his two-year producership. Sutton was brought in to make sure the show was completed without going too far over schedule. Officially, Sutton produced seasons five, six and seven, but in fact, he took over producership halfway through the filming of the Henry VI/Richard III tetralogy, which was filmed from September 1981 to April 1982 and aired during season five in early 1983. Miller produced The First Part of Henry the Sixt and The Second Part of Henry the Sixt, Sutton produced The Third Part of Henry the Sixt and The Tragedy of Richard III. Sutton also produced the Miller directed King Lear, which was shot in March and April 1982, and aired as the season five opener in October 1982. As such, unlike the transition from Messina to Miller, the transition from Miller to Sutton was virtually unnoticeable.

Sutton kept Miller's title sequence, but he dropped Stephen Oliver's theme music, and instead the music composed specifically for each episode served as the opening title music for that episode (except for The Two Gentlemen of Verona, which had no original music, so Oliver's theme music from seasons 3–5 was used). When asked how he felt about Messina's time as producer, Sutton responded simply "I thought the approach was a little ordinary, and that we could do better." Sutton also continued with Messina and Miller's tendency to let the directors get on with the job;

three things matter in all drama; there is the script, the director and the cast. If you've got those three right, it doesn't matter if you do it on cardboard sets, or moderately lit – it doesn't even matter in television sometimes if it is badly shot [...] scripts are the foundation of the whole thing, rather than the way you present them. Writers, directors, actors; if those three are good, you can do it on the back of a cart.

=== Reception ===
Messina's gamble in 1978 ultimately proved successful, as the series was a financial success. Only eighteen months into the project the series had recovered almost 50% of its budget through foreign sales. By 1982 was already turning a profit. This was primarily because of sales to foreign markets, with far more countries showing the series than was initially expected; as well as the UK and the US, the show was screened in Australia, Austria, the Bahamas, Bahrain, Barbados, Belgium, Bhutan, Bulgaria, Canada, Chile, China, Colombia, Czechoslovakia, Dubai, Egypt, France, Greece, Honduras, Hong Kong, Hungary, India, Iraq, Ireland, Italy, Jamaica, Japan, Jordan, Kenya, Korea, Lebanon, Malaysia, Mexico, the Netherlands, New Zealand, Panama, Peru, the Philippines, Poland, Portugal, Puerto Rico, Qatar, Romania, Saudi Arabia, Singapore, Spain, Sri Lanka, Taiwan, Thailand, Trinidad and Tobago, Turkey, Venezuela, West Germany and Yugoslavia.

Writing for the Los Angeles Times in 1985, Cecil Smith noted "the series has been the target of critical catcalls on both sides of the Atlantic, shabbily treated by many PBS stations, and often ignored or damned as dull, dull, dull." The early episodes in particular came in for criticism. Speaking of Romeo & Juliet, Clive James wrote in The Observer "Verona seemed to have been built on very level ground, like the floor of a television studio. The fact that this artificiality was half accepted, half denied, told you that you were not in Verona at all, but in that semi-abstract, semi-concrete, wholly uninteresting city which is known to students as Messina." Also speaking of Romeo & Juliet, The Daily Telegraph's Richard Last predicted, "the BBC Television Shakespeare will be, above all else, stylistically safe. Tradition and consolidation, rather than adventure or experiment, are to be the touchstones."

In his review of the first season for The Daily Telegraph, Sean Day-Lewis stated that Romeo & Juliet, As You Like It and Julius Caesar were unsuccessful, while King Richard the Second, Measure for Measure and The Famous History of the Life of King Henry the Eight were successful. However, even in the failures, he found qualities and as such, "it has not been a bad start, given some directors new to the problems of translating Shakespeare to television." The BBC's Reaction Index, a measure of audience approval, consistently ran at 75–80% for the first two seasons, higher than the average television drama. However viewing figures for Romeo and Juliet, the first instalment, were at 1.9 million British viewers, whereas a rerun of The Sound of Music three weeks later attracted 26 million viewers. Over the entire series, the average ratings in Britain sat around 3 million viewers, which was not high by comparison with mainstream programming but was significant for arts programming. The highest-rating program in the US was Hamlet, which reached 5.5 million viewers.

Reviewing the second season production of The Tempest for The Times Literary Supplement, Stanley Reynolds opined that although "there is very little for purists to find fault with [...] the most damning thing you could say about it [is] there is nothing to stir the blood to hot flashes of anger or to the electric joy of a new experience. What we got was some more of the BBC's ghastly middle taste." Sheldon P. Zitner, writing in University of Toronto Quarterly, considered the mixed success of the series thus far, but felt that the series was right to avoid overly innovative adaptation when it had a mass audience in mind. He concluded that "at their best [the productions] have combined caution with ingenuity". At the start of the show's run, Richard Ingrams, in The Spectator, praised the series for taking a "straightforward approach". Comparing it to several contemporary theatre productions of Shaekspeare, which experimented aesthetically or politically with the text, Ingrams argued that many audiences were put off by "ridiculous gimmicks" designed to "bear out a don's theory expounded in length in the progarmme note". Mark Crispin Miller, although opposing productions that altered the text for political or aesthetic purposes, disliked the "relentlessly pedantic approach" which he felt had made the plays both "incomprehensible" and "inaccessible" for the average audience member. Miller believed that, if Shakespeare were alive, he would have removed topical references that didn't mean anything to the audience in the 20th century, rather than expecting them to enjoy the text as an "empty antiquarian spectacle".

As the series came to a close, Literary Review's Andrew Rissik wrote "it must now be apparent as the BBC wind up their Shakespeare with Titus Andronicus – that the whole venture has been reckless and misguided [...] Messina's first productions were clumsy and unspecific, badly shot in the main and indifferently cast. Miller's productions were a clear improvement; their visual style was precise and distinctive and the casting, on the whole, intelligently done [...] But the series has not been a success." Speaking more bluntly, Michael Bogdanov called the series "the greatest disservice to Shakespeare in the last 25 years." Stanley Wells in the Times Literary Supplement, although conceding that some directors did well with the plays and "a few—such as [Elijah] Moshinsky in Coriolanus—interpret them with real flair and originality", felt that the series failed to "comprehensively tackle—let alone solve—the problems of adapting Shakespeare to the television medium".

Others were more sanguine. In Shakespeare Survey, Neil Taylor concluded that directors such as Moshinsky and Jane Howell "may not have solved all the problems, but they certainly tackled some of them, boldly". Taylor believed that those directors showed in their productions "a sensitivity to the character of television as a cultural form in itself". Olwen Terris writes that, for all the perceived flaws, the projects were technically excellent (and often received awards on this basis) with many "performances to admire". Most importantly, they gave "millions of people the opportunity to see rarely performed plays", as well as the chance for people who could not or did not visit theatre to see the plays in performance. William W.E. Slights dismissed grand claims of overall success or overall failure, arguing that the series was "an aggregation of failures, partial successes, and successes." Reflecting on the project in Shakespeare on Film Newsletter, Scott Colley declared that "by and large, the series seemed to work", particularly those production directed by Miller, Moshinsky, and Howell. H. R. Coursen acknowledged that the quality of the productions varied, but cautioned against too many complaints about a lack of 'innovation' in products. Coursen recalled the "garbage unloaded upon us in the '60s and early '70s" in productions that prioritised innovation over the text, and remarked that the series had a particular strength in that "BBC-TV remains a vehicle for acting, as U.S. TV is not".

The series' final producer Shaun Sutton summed it up as "the end of a great era, a great incident in the life of television". Ultimately, Stanley Wells acknowledged that, in an era when Shakespeare on television was declining, the "grandiose scheme" of doing the complete works was a way of keeping Shakespeare on the air: ""although there have been some disappointments, we can be grateful for an ambitious enterprise which at least is not demeaning Shakespeare, and which has had some real successes." In the words of John J. O'Connor in the New York Times, these productions are not experimental but instead "are careful, almost primer-like interpretations, rarely less than competent, frequently shot through with marvelous displays of action." O'Connor believed the series was an important cultural experiment, saying that with an above average production "the genius of Shakespeare takes over, transcending everything in the immediate vicinity. That, finally, is what gives 'The Shakespeare Plays' lasting value".

Ace G. Pilkington, one of the first academics to treat the BBC plays as major texts in a book-length study, analysed the reception of the series, particularly the Henry IV/Henry V plays. Comparing reviews with the production on video, Pilkington found numerous examples of reviewers misreading or "overhastily reading" the productions, so that their reviews sometimes did not accurately describe what had happened on screen, or failed to interpret deliberate stylistic choices made by each production's director. Pilkington gives two reasons for this. The first is the idea of an "expectational text": that reviewers were coming to the productions with memories of stage interpretations and higher-budget films, and were unable to objectively view the productions through the prism of what could be achieved in a short time period in a contemporary television studio. The second reason was that, in an era when home media was still very new, reviewers were only able to watch each production once, but were nevertheless likely to expect each production to meet "definitive" standards of how the text should be interpreted. Pilkington, writing several years after the series had ended, argued that with the rise of home video and a wider market of video Shakespeare options, viewers could more readily enjoy a production as one interpretation, rather than expecting it to represent the play in some definitive form.

== The series ==
=== Season 1 ===
==== Romeo and Juliet ====
- Directed by Alvin Rakoff
- Produced by Cedric Messina
- Designed by Stuart Walker
- Taping dates: 31 January-5 February 1978
- First transmitted in the UK: 3 December 1978
- First transmitted in the US: 14 March 1979
- Running time (PAL DVD): 168 minutes

Cast

- Patrick Ryecart as Romeo
- Rebecca Saire as Juliet
- Celia Johnson as Nurse
- Michael Hordern as Capulet
- John Gielgud as Chorus
- Joseph O'Conor as Friar Laurence
- Laurence Naismith as Prince Escalus
- Anthony Andrews as Mercutio
- Alan Rickman as Tybalt
- Jacqueline Hill as Lady Capulet
- Christopher Strauli as Benvolio
- Christopher Northey as Paris
- Paul Henry as Peter
- Roger Davidson as Balthasar
- John Paul as Montague
- Zulema Dene as Lady Montague
- Esmond Knight as Old Capulet
- David Sibley as Sampson
- Jack Carr as Gregory
- Bunny Reed as Abraham
- Vernon Dobtcheff as Apothecary
- John Savident as Friar John
- Danny Schiller as Musician
- Jeremy Young as 1st Watch
- Jeffrey Chiswick as 2nd Watch
- Gary Taylor as Potpan
- Mark Arden as Page
- Robert Burbage as Page
- Alan Bowerman as 1st Citizen

===== Behind the scenes =====
Rakoff opted for "high Renaissance Tuscany" as his setting, acknowledging that the ambience of such a location was "encrusted in tradition". His previous experience directing stylised productions, for example with backcloths rather than sets aiming for realism, led him to conclude that it's difficult to take the audience along for a character-based journey in that situation. The period also allowed for simpler, more youthful outfits for costume designer Odette Barrow than those in Elizabethan England. Barrow found inspiration from designs archived at the Witt Library of the Courtauld Institute of Art. Celia Johnson was cast against type, being known for playing "genteel" characters such as her most famous role in Brief Encounter. The sequence of the dance at the Capulets' party was shot in one take.

Rebecca Saire was only fourteen when the production was filmed, an unusually young age for an actress playing Juliet, although the character is just thirteen. In interviews with the press prior to the broadcast, Saire was critical of director Alvin Rakoff, stating that in his interpretation, Juliet is too childlike and asexual. This horrified the series' producers, who cancelled several scheduled interviews with the actress in the lead-up to broadcast. For his part, Rakoff admitted that Saire "does have limitations—which you're bound to have at that age—but at least she is fourteen."

The Prefaces to Shakespeare episode for Romeo & Juliet was presented by Peggy Ashcroft, who had played Juliet in a 1932 Oxford University Dramatic Society production directed by John Gielgud. The Shakespeare in Perspective episode was presented by feminist academic and journalist Germaine Greer.

===== Reception =====
Jacqueline Pearson argued that it was frustrating to lose much of Friar Laurence's admonitory speeches, as the audience thus missed the "teasing ambiguities" which surround the central relationship, and leaving the focus on the impulsive nature of the lovers. Instead, Pearson felt Rakoff "rather sentimentalised the relationship by cutting out these antithetical images or minimising their dramatic impact." Many reviewers focused on the casting of the leads, and particularly Saire. Mike Silverman, in the New Orleans Times-Picayune, said that Saire's casting was a "gamble that did not pay off", and that she seemed "more a petulant child than a passionate young woman". Tom Shales, in the Washington Post, agreed, feeling that "the casting of the two leads is a disappointment" and that Saire, while "persuasively youthful and eager, nevertheless lacks passion". By contrast, Howard Rosenberg in the Los Angeles Times claimed Saire was "appropriately fresh as dew, fragile and innocent". John J. O'Connor for the New York Times praised both leads as "never less than appealing and nearly always touching", saying that Saire "beautifully embodies the innocence and natural sophistication of Juliet".

Clive James was dismissive almost entirely, arguing that only Gielgud, as the Chorus, understood how to speak the lines, and singling out Andrews's treatment of the verse for criticism. In The New Statesman, Julian Barnes was equivocal. Barnes said Saire "carries off the pertness of Juliet well" and Hordern was "incomparable" but that the "supposed humour and bawdry of the play was, as usual, tiresome and deficient". Nancy Banks-Smith enjoyed the production, citing Horden as "a superbly funny Capulet" and being moved by Celia Johnson as the nurse. But Banks-Smith felt the play's Renaissance setting would make it less relateable for young people, when real-world analogues such as Northern Ireland would have an immediacy otherwise lacking. For The Spectator, Richard Ingrams wrote that Saire was poor and Ryecart "delivered almost all his speeches on a monotonous low A flat", with only Hordern proving memorable.

==== King Richard the Second ====
- Directed by David Giles
- Produced by Cedric Messina
- Designed by Tony Abbott
- Taping dates: 12–17 April 1978
- First transmitted in the UK: 10 December 1978
- First transmitted in the US: 28 March 1979
- Running time (PAL DVD): 157 minutes

Cast

- Derek Jacobi as King Richard
- John Gielgud as John of Gaunt
- Jon Finch as Henry Bolingbroke
- Wendy Hiller as Duchess of York
- Charles Gray as Duke of York
- Mary Morris as Duchess of Gloucester
- David Swift as Duke of Northumberland
- Clifford Rose as Bishop of Carlisle
- Charles Keating as Duke of Aumerle
- Richard Owens as Thomas Mowbray
- Janet Maw as Queen
- Jeffrey Holland as Duke of Surrey
- Jeremy Bulloch as Henry Percy
- Robin Sachs as Bushy
- Damien Thomas as Bagot
- Alan Dalton as Green
- David Dodimead as Lord Ross
- John Flint as Lord Willoughby
- Carl Oatley as Earl Berkeley
- William Whymper as Sir Stephen Scroop
- John Barcroft as Earl of Salisbury
- David Garfield as Welsh Captain
- Desmond Adams as Sir Pierce of Exton
- Joe Ritchie as Groom
- Paddy Ward as Keeper
- Bruno Barnabe as Abbot of Westminster
- Jonathan Adams as Gardener
- Alan Collins as Gardener's Man
- John Curless as Lord Fitzwater
- Terry Wright as Murderer
- Ronald Fernee as Servant
- Tim Brown as Herald
- Mike Lewin as Herald
- Phillida Sewell as Queen's Lady
- Sandra Frieze as Queen's Lady

===== Behind the scenes =====
Director David Giles shot the episode in such a way as to create a visual metaphor for Richard's position in relation to the court. Early in the production, he is constantly seen above the rest of the characters, especially at the top of stairs, but he always descends to the same level as everyone else, and often ends up below them. As the episode goes on, his positioning above characters becomes less and less frequent. An interpretative move by Giles which was especially well received by critics was his division of Richard's lengthy prison cell soliloquy up into several sections, which fade from one to another, suggesting a passage of time, and an ongoing slowly developing thought process. Giles saw the play as "unabashedly theatrical" and set out to give the outdoor scenes (filmed in a studio) a sense of symbolism and iconography, as with the garden sequence and the opening scene in the lists. Designer Tony Abbott's set consisted of large units that could be reoriented to create different perspectives and designs, "like an enormous Lego set", to give the overall impression of Gothic architecture.

For the costumes, Giles set out to make clothes that looked as much as possible like things the characters wore every day, rather that something out of a book of hours. He noted that people in the Middle Ages did not wear clothes as a form of self-expression. While Richard and his court wear colours, Bolingbroke remains in black and silver armour until he becomes King, and then is dressed more colourfully. John Gielgud, who played John of Gaunt, had directed the play multiple times. Jon Finch, having little experience performing Shakespeare on the stage, was nervous about the role until Gielgud praised his verse at the table reading; Finch had more confidence after this. Giles and Jacobi agreed early on that Richard was guilty of the murder of Woodstock which precedes the play. Giles said that they agreed on Richard's emotion in the first scene as being "high tension because it's the moment he's been waiting for so long".

This episode was repeated on 12 December 1979 in the UK and on 19 March 1980 in the US, as a lead-in to the Henry IV/Henry V trilogy. The Shakespeare in Perspective episode which introduced King Richard the Second was presented by historian Paul Johnson, who argued that the Henriad very much advanced the Tudor myth, something also argued by Graham Holderness who saw the BBC's presentation of the Henriad as "illustrating the violation of natural social 'order' by the deposition of a legitimate king."

The Prefaces to Shakespeare episode for King Richard the Second was hosted by Ian Richardson, who had starred in a 1974 RSC production directed by John Barton, in which he had alternated the roles of Richard and Bolingbroke with actor Richard Pasco.

===== Reception =====
The production was well reviewed and seen as a highlight of the first series. Howard Rosenberg, for the Los Angeles Times, praised the "extaordinarily fine, fully realised production", singling out Charles Gray, "superb as the poor old Duke of York". Rosenberg thought the decision to break up Richard's prison speech among several scenes was well-done, which was echoed by Michael Manheim. Manheim thought Giles made the best use of the television medium: while not able to rely on long shots and location shooting, Giles "achieves the magnificence and broad sweep with texture rather than distance". Jack Jorgens also found Giles's use of the camera to be deliberate, and felt the production did well with the play's small scenes, which directors often rush through but were given strong focus here. In the New York Times, John J. O'Connor agreed, saying that the "brief but crucial scenes that serve as connecting points for the plot" can get lost on a large theatre stage but, in Giles's production, "received their proper weight in the intimacy of the small screen". Arthur Unger, in Christian Science Monitor, praised Gielgud and Hiller for playing their roles "with a kind of gutsy enthusiasm balanced with irony". Reviewers applauded Jacobi's sensitive performance in the title role. Gerald Clarke, in Time, felt that in the hands of Giles and Jacobi the play became "an almost contemporary study of power used and abused".

Peter Jenkins, in The Spectator, called it "a triumphant success" and that "the play really worked in close up", with Jacobi playing his character's speeches "with great beauty and sensitivity". Clive James praised the "rich costumes, solid props and dense, convincing backgrounds". He lauded both lead actors: Jacobi giving "intelligent, fastidiously articulated readings from beginning to end" while Finch gave depth to a character who is straightforward on the page, conveying someone "heading for the throne of England by the direct route". He considered Finch's Henry IV "the revelation of the evening". James also argued that Giles's approach was correct in recognising that television should not try to look like a film but should focus on the actors and the small screen. Nancy Banks-Smith, in The Guardian, took the opposite view, expressing her dissatisfaction at the use of television to present an essentially theatrical, studio-bound production of the play, rather than conveying the England which is at stake in the plot. However Banks-Smith praised the use of television as a medium for the soliloquy, and Jacobi's performance being modulated to fit.

==== As You Like It ====
- Directed by Basil Coleman
- Produced by Cedric Messina
- Designed by Don Taylor
- Taping dates: 30 May-16 June 1978
- First transmitted in the UK: 17 December 1978
- First transmitted in the US: 28 February 1979
- Running time (PAL DVD): 150 minutes

Cast

- Helen Mirren as Rosalind
- Brian Stirner as Orlando
- Richard Pasco as Jaques
- Angharad Rees as Celia
- James Bolam as Touchstone
- Clive Francis as Oliver
- Richard Easton as Duke Frederick
- Tony Church as Banished Duke
- John Quentin as Le Beau
- Maynard Williams as Silvius
- Victoria Plucknett as Phebe
- Marilyn Le Conte as Audrey
- Tom McDonnell as Amiens
- David Lloyd Meredith as Corin
- Arthur Hewlett as Adam
- Jeffrey Holland as William
- Timothy Bateson as Sir Oliver Martext
- David Prowse as Charles
- John Moulder-Brown as Hymen
- Paul Bentall as Jacques de Boys
- Peter Tullo as Palace Lord
- Mike Lewin as Palace Lord
- Carl Forgione as Banished Duke's Lord
- Max Harvey as Banished Duke's Lord
- Chris Sullivan as Dennis
- Paul Phoenix as Page
- Barry Holden as Page

===== Behind the scenes =====
The production was shot at Glamis Castle in Scotland, one of only two productions shot on location, with the other being The Famous History of the Life of Henry the Eight. The location shooting received a lukewarm response from both critics and the BBC's own people, however, with the general consensus being that the natural world in the episode overwhelmed the actors and the story. Director Basil Coleman initially felt that the play should be filmed over the course of a year, with the change in seasons from winter to summer marking the ideological change in the characters, but he was forced to shoot entirely in May, even though the play begins in winter. This, in turn, meant the harshness of the forest described in the text was replaced by lush greenery, which was distinctly unthreatening, with the characters' "time in the forest appear[ing] to be more an upscale camping expedition rather than exile." A shepherd's cottage, built for the production, had to be rebuilt after cows ate the first one.

The Prefaces to Shakespeare episode for As You Like It was presented by Janet Suzman, who had played Rosalind in a 1967 RSC production directed by George Rylands. The Shakespeare in Perspective episode was presented by novelist Brigid Brophy.

===== Reception =====
Cecil Smith, in the Los Angeles Times, labelled this "a marvelous production", with the clarity of the actors' speech "almost music". Jacqueline Pearson called this the most successful of the first three plays broadcast in the US. Nancy Banks-Smith, in The Guardian, found the production to be charming and the best of the first series, calling Mirren a "heart-shaker" whose performance was "changing and catching the light", and argued that Rees was stronger than most Celias. Bryan Johnson, in The Globe and Mail, said that this production was a turning point to reveal the series as "a stroke of sheer inspiration", and that the "delightful production" saw the play taken to "the great outdoors like some forest creature returning home". Johnson compared As You Like It favourably to Julius Caesar, preferring the characters delivering their soliloquies and asides direct to camera, rather than in Herbert Wise's play where such lines were delivered as voiceover, as if internal monologues. Don Shirley also approved of the location filming, saying that "This colourful production is escapist entertainment at its most sublime"

In contrast, John J. O'Connor labelled the production "an outright failure", especially in relation to the location shooting. Jack Jorgens, for Shakespeare Quarterly, criticised Coleman's direction: "the blocking and framing are often awkward, the compositions ungainly, and the cutting poorly timed ... It must be said that seldom have natural settings been used to less effects". R. Alan Kimbrough, in Shakespeare on Film Newsletter, believed that the exterior filming led to both "visual delights" and "visual disasters", but that the summer appeal of the locations "forces some disquieting contradictions between what the characters say and what we see". Kimbrough believed Rees as Celia to be too "vivacious and stunningly beautiful" to realistically be seen as lesser than Rosalind, and was annoyed by the out-of-place Scottish accent for Charles and Irish accent for Phebe. But he said Mirren was a triumph as Rosalind and Pasco effectively struck a balance as Jaques. Sean Day-Lewis, writing for the Daily Telegraph, summarised that the production "only intermittently engaged the emotions and never caught fire."

J. C. Bulman cautioned against over-criticising the location, arguing that As You Like It contains "much mockery of the pastoral ethos" itself. Bulman felt that Coleman, to comply with the series' regulations, did well to put "quotation marks around the pastoral artifice" and to play up the satire by contrasting the myth-making of the 'pastoral' genre with the reality of life in the country.

==== Julius Caesar ====
- Directed by Herbert Wise
- Produced by Cedric Messina
- Designed by Tony Abbott
- Taping dates: 26–31 July 1978
- First transmitted in UK: 11 February 1979
- First transmitted in the US: 14 February 1979
- Running time (PAL DVD): 161 minutes

Cast

- Richard Pasco as Marcus Brutus
- Charles Gray as Julius Caesar
- Keith Michell as Marcus Antonius
- David Collings as Cassius
- Virginia McKenna as Portia
- Elizabeth Spriggs as Calphurnia
- Sam Dastor as Casca
- Jon Laurimore as Flavius
- John Sterland as Marullus
- Garrick Hagon as Octavius Caesar
- Brian Coburn as Messala
- Leonard Preston as Titinius
- Alexander Davion as Decius Brutus
- Darien Angadi as Cinna
- Andrew Hilton as Lucilius
- Anthony Dawes as Ligarius
- Roger Bizley as Metellus
- Manning Wilson as Cicero
- Ronald Forfar as Soothsayer
- Patrick Marley as Artemidorus
- William Simons as Trebonius
- John Tordoff as Cinna the Poet
- Philip York as Young Cato
- Christopher Good as Clitus
- Robert Oates as Pindarus
- Alan Thompson as 1st Citizen/1st Plebeian
- Leo Dolan as 2nd Citizen/2nd Plebeian
- Johnny Wade as 3rd Plebeian/1st Soldier
- David Henry as 4th Plebeian/2nd Soldier
- Jonathan Scott-Taylor as Lucius
- Tom Kelly as Claudius
- Jack Eliott as Octavius's Servant
- Michael Cogan as Caesar's Servant
- Reginald Jessup as Poet
- Maurice Thorogood as Strato
- Michael Greatorex as Varro
- Nicholas Gecks as Volumnius
- Michael Jenkinson as Dardanius
- Roy Spencer as Lepidus
- Terence Conoley as Popilius
- Noel Johnson as Publius

===== Behind the scenes =====
Director Herbert Wise felt that Julius Caesar should be set in the Elizabethan era, but as per the emphasis on realism, he instead set it in a Roman milieu. Wise argued that the play "is not really a Roman play. It's an Elizabethan play and it's a view of Rome from an Elizabethan standpoint." Regarding setting the play in Shakespeare's day, Wise stated that, "I don't think that's right for the audience we will be getting. It's not a jaded theatre audience seeing the play for the umpteenth time: for them that would be an interesting approach and might throw new light on the play. But for an audience many of whom won't have seen the play before, I believe it would only be confusing." Nevertheless, Wise estimated that only ten lines had been cut.

Costume designer Odette Barrow sourced material for new togas and tunics but also re-used some from the BBC's earlier production of I, Claudius, although had to remove decorations as this was an aesthetically simpler period in Rome's history. Late in the pre-production period, Barrow discovered research showing that the Roman military uniforms used for previous productions were not entirely accurate, and the designs had to be hastily fixed. Designer Tony Abbott created columns with different designs on each side and a set that could be switched around throughout production to create new locations. Keith Michell, playing Mark Antony, had played Antony in the BBC's biggest previous production of the Roman tales, fifteen years earlier, The Spread of the Eagle.

The Prefaces to Shakespeare episode for Julius Caesar was presented by Ronald Pickup, who had played Octavius Caesar in a 1964 Royal Court Theatre production directed by Lindsay Anderson, and Cassius in a 1977 National Theatre production directed by John Schlesinger. The Shakespeare in Perspective episode was presented by political commentator Jonathan Dimbleby.

===== Reception =====
Julius Caesar had long been a popular play on the school curriculum and seen as particularly inoffensive for children. Reviews tended to agree that the same applied to this production, in both positive and negative ways. Tom Shales of The Washington Post called this "glorious" and "a magnificent start" to the series, with "spellbinding immediacy and urgency", saying that television made the tragedy more accessible. Robert E. Knoll, agreed, saying that "the quality of acting is uniformly high" and one is unlikely to see "a more eloquent Antony than Keith Michell".

Janet Maslin, of The New York Times, largely enjoyed the production and the decision to have the cameras move among the actors to create a momentum that felt theatrical. Maslin especially praised David Collings's "ideally shifty-eyed and spiky" Cassius and Charles Gray, whose expert portrayal of Caesar as a politician became "the most affecting portion of the production". Yet Maslin felt Keith Michell was the "principal disappointment", a sentiment echoed by Gerald Clark in Time, who found Michell "too old and fleshy to be a vigorous and virile Antony". In contrast, Jo McMurtry, while acknowledging Michell was older than the usual performer for Antony, found that the age gap helped to create the sense of Antony as a foil for a young Octavius. Sylvia Clayton, in the Daily Telegraph, was equivocal: "It was a cautious production ... reverent in speech, conventional in movement."

More critical reviewers disliked the perceived lack of a directorial interpretation. Arthur Unger, in Christian Science Monitor, called Wise's production a "scholarly, peculiarly bloodless rendition of a passionate play." Nancy Banks-Smith, in the Guardian, praised Collings's "attractive performance" in spite of what she felt was casting that ignored description of Cassius in the script, and noted that the play brought to life events that felt remarkably similar to contemporary news. But overall Banks-Smith found the production's sense of place and political nuance poor when compared to Trevor Nunn's version of Antony and Cleopatra, which had played on television in 1974. Jack Jorgens was more straightforward in Shakespeare Quarterly: the performances were "silly, affected, awkward, wooden, or misguided", leading to "a mediocre piece of television, full of disorganised, banal, ugly images." Andrew James Hartley has written that the production is evidence of why a Shakespeare production needs to grow organically out of rehearsal in the theatre, a process of interaction and discovery. Instead, by rehearsing for a short period that is inevitably shaped by the technical demands of television, many small moments are at odds with the text and concepts don't have internal logic. For the Sunday Telegraph, Wise's production had "a curiously unsweaty, antiseptic smell to the proceedings".

==== Measure for Measure ====
- Directed by Desmond Davis
- Produced by Cedric Messina
- Designed by Stuart Walker
- Taping dates: 17–22 May 1978
- First transmitted in the UK: 18 February 1979
- First transmitted in the US: 11 April 1979
- Running time (PAL DVD): 145 minutes

Cast

- Kenneth Colley as Duke
- Kate Nelligan as Isabella
- Tim Pigott-Smith as Angelo
- Christopher Strauli as Claudio
- John McEnery as Lucio
- Jacqueline Pearce as Mariana
- Frank Middlemass as Pompey
- Alun Armstrong as Provost
- Adrienne Corri as Mistress Overdone
- Ellis Jones as Elbow
- John Clegg as Froth
- William Sleigh as Barnardine
- Neil McCarthy as Abhorson
- Yolande Palfrey as Juliet
- Eileen Page as Francisca
- Kevin Stoney as Escalus
- Godfrey Jackman as Friar Thomas
- Alan Tucker as First Gentleman
- John Abbott as Second Gentleman
- David Browning as A Justice
- Geoffrey Cousins as Servant
- David King Lassman as Pageboy

===== Behind the scenes =====
The role of the Duke was originally offered to Alec Guinness. After he turned it down, the role was offered to a further thirty-one actors before Kenneth Colley accepted the part.

Director Desmond Davis based the brothel in the play on a traditional Western saloon and the prison on a typical horror film dungeon. The set for the episode was a 360-degree set backed by a cyclorama, which allowed actors to move from location to location without cutting – actors could walk through the streets of Vienna by circumnavigating the studio eight times. For the interview scenes, Davis decided to link them aesthetically and shot both in the same manner; Angelo was shot upwards from waist level to make him look large, Isabella was shot from further away so more background was visible in her shots, making her appear smaller. Gradually, the shots then move towards each other's style so that, by the end of the scene, they are both shot in the same framing. There was minimal cutting of dialogue, with script editor Alan Shallcross focusing on removing the material that is designed to build the intensity around the Duke's return to Vienna, which he felt added minor characters and situations that were unnecessary for the viewer.

Shallcross wrote additional Elizabethan dialogue for the background characters in crowd scenes, such as the sequence where Mistress Overdone is arrested, since the actors could not improvise as they would in a modern production. Costume designer Odette Barrow based her costumes on Italian fashions of the time as the Viennese fashions used stiff fabrics and styles that would have been difficult for the actors to work with. The brothel and the convent were the same set, just painted different colours, which amused Davis due to its sense of duality between the two places.

The Prefaces to Shakespeare episode for Measure for Measure was presented by Judi Dench, who had played Isabella in a 1962 RSC production directed by Peter Hall. The Shakespeare in Perspective episode was presented by barrister and author Sir John Mortimer.

===== Reception =====
The production was generally acclaimed, although Nancy Banks-Smith, in The Guardian, felt that of the male performers only Frank Middlemass could match the women. Robert Last, in the Times, believed the production successfully found the texture of contemporary drama, "full of irony and black humour", but argued Colley was "strangely miscast" as the manipulative Duke. Virginia M. Carr saw in the Isabella/Angelo scenes, proof that "television may be the best vehicle available for Shakespeare's art" but did not believe that the street scenes and Lucio's comedy sequences achieved the same heights on camera.

Cecil Smith called the production "dazzling" and singled out Nelligan for praise, as did Tom Shales in The Washington Post, who also praised Pearce as Mariana, as well as the director's "fluid touch". John J. O'Connor called this production "by far the most successful" of the first series, citing the cast as an ensemble and the "curiously modern themes" of the play. Such a sentiment was echoed by H. R. Coursen, in Literature/Film Quarterly, who felt that the script "seems almost to have been written for television". He cited Davis's camera direction, which balanced well with the actors to navigate the ambivalent themes of the play. Maurice Charney, in Shakespeare Quarterly, said that this was "the only production of the series so far that one wants to compare to memorable performances in the theatre".

Clive James, often dismissive of the first season, admired Davis's realistic use of crowds and planned camera perspectives. James said this production had "the best costumes and décor of the Bardathon so far", that Nelligan strongly used her voice and innate intelligence to give a powerful performance, and that Tim Pigott-Smith spoke so well that "you felt a glittering career was assured".

==== The Famous History of the Life of King Henry the Eight ====
- Directed by Kevin Billington
- Produced by Cedric Messina
- Designed by Don Taylor
- Taping dates: 27 November 1978 – 7 January 1979
- First transmitted in UK: 25 February 1979
- First transmitted in the US: 25 April 1979
- Running time (PAL DVD): 165 minutes

Cast

- Tony Church as Prologue
- John Stride as Henry VIII
- Julian Glover as Duke of Buckingham
- Jeremy Kemp as Duke of Norfolk
- David Rintoul as Lord Abergavenny
- Timothy West as Cardinal Wolsey
- John Rowe as Cromwell
- Lewis Fiander as Duke of Suffolk
- Alan Leith as Sergeant-at-Arms
- Claire Bloom as Katharine of Aragon
- John Bailey as Griffith, Gentleman-Usher
- David Troughton as A Surveyor
- John Nettleton as Lord Chamberlain
- Charles Lloyd-Pack as Lord Sandys
- Nigel Lambert as Sir Thomas Lovell
- Barbara Kellerman as Anne Bullen
- Adam Bareham as Sir Henry Guildford
- Jeffrey Daunton as A Servant
- John Cater as 1st Gentleman
- Roger Lloyd-Pack as 2nd Gentleman
- Jack McKenzie as Sir Nicholas Vaux
- Michael Poole as Cardinal Campeius
- Peter Vaughan as Gardiner, Bishop of Winchester
- Sylvia Coleridge as Old Lady, Anne Bullen's friend
- Michael Gaunt as A Crier
- Ronald Pickup as Cranmer, Archbishop of Canterbury
- David Dodimead as Bishop of Lincoln
- Emma Kirkby as Singer
- Sally Home as Patience
- Oliver Cotton as Earl of Surrey
- Michael Walker as A Messenger
- John Rhys-Davies as Capucius, Ambassador from Emperor Charles V
- Timothy Barker as Page to Gardiner
- Brian Osborne as Door-keeper of the Council Chamber
- John Rogan as Dr. Butts
- Jack May as Lord Chancellor

===== Behind the scenes =====
The second of only two episodes shot on location, after As You Like It. Whereas the location shooting in that episode was heavily criticised as taking away from the play, here, the location work was celebrated. The episode was shot at Leeds Castle, Penshurst Place and Hever Castle, in the actual rooms in which some of the real events took place. Director Kevin Billington felt that location shooting was essential to the production; "I wanted to get away from the idea that this is some kind of fancy pageant. I wanted to feel the reality. I wanted great stone walls [...] We shot at Hever Castle, where Anne Bullen lived; at Penhurst, which was Buckingham's place; and at Leeds Castle, where Henry was with Anne Bullen." Wilders fought to retain the porter scene (Act 5, scene 4) as the only scene in the play where the common people are represented. But Billington believed that, aside from introducing new, minor characters, the play's main purpose on stage was to allow costume changes for others, and it wasn't needed in the television format. Costume designer Alun Hughes utilised Tudor paintings as sources for his costumes.

Shooting on location had several benefits; the camera could be set up in such a way as to show ceilings, which cannot be done when shooting in a TV studio, as rooms are ceiling-less to facilitate lighting. The episode was shot in winter, and on occasions, characters' breath can be seen, which was also impossible to achieve in studio. The weather was so cold that, for Buckingham's death scene upon a lake, the production team had to break the ice first before they could launch the boat. Ultimately, because of the cost, logistics and planning required for shooting on location, Messina decided that all subsequent productions would be done in-studio, a decision which did not go down well with several of the directors lined up for work on the second season.

This episode was not originally supposed to be part of the first season, but was moved forward in the schedule to replace the abandoned production of Much Ado About Nothing. It was repeated on 22 June 1981.

The Prefaces to Shakespeare episode for The Famous History of the Life of King Henry the Eight was presented by Donald Sinden, who had played Henry in a 1969 RCS production directed by Trevor Nunn. The Shakespeare in Perspective episode was presented by novelist and literary scholar Anthony Burgess.

===== Reception =====
Reviews were mixed, and Jack Jorgens spoke for many when he said that the piece was less successful but this "had much more to do with the limitations of the work itself than with failures in production and performance". For Jorgens, the actors did a creditable job and the design and editing suggested the BBC had "hit its stride" with the Shakespeare Plays, but ultimately audiences were too familiar with better versions of stories about Henry VIII and his wives. "The play simply fails to sustain interest for three hours". John J. O'Connor believed that the evident dampness of the locations led to "a seeming epidemic of vocal nasality among the actors" that was an unpleasant viewing experience. James Larden in The Washington Post was disappointed in what he saw as "low-keyed" performances. In The Globe and Mail, Ray Conlogue declared that John Stride never found much of interest in his portrayal of the dull title character, and that the play as text collapsed completely in the second half. But Conlogue had only praise for Bloom, who proved people wrong who think that "goodness is difficult to portray" as an actor. Maurice Charney believed "most Americans found this episodic play exceedingly dull" and criticised Giles for using close-ups "monotonously" to reflect the conflict between characters.

By contrast, while acknowledging that the script was "a journeyman job", Nancy Banks-Smith in The Guardian called this the best production so far. She praised West's performance above all, as well as the effects Billington managed to achieve with his camera on location. Sylvia Clayton, in the Times, believed the location shooting was a perfect match for the "magnificent velvets, furs and jewels of Tudor costume". Clive James argued that Billington's aesthetic choices succeeded by giving the production a "soft look", rather than trying to capture the familiar aesthetic of Hans Holbein which most viewers initially think of for this material. James praised West for making Wolsey's fall sympathetic and Stride for doing well with a lead part that has little to offer on the page, but reserved his greatest thoughts for Bloom, in what he called "the best performance of the series so far". Bloom, James said, "spoke the verse with unfaltering musicality even when racked by emotion", managing to make it credible that Katherine continues to love Henry even as he turns her world upside-down.

In the New York Times, Benedict Nightingale was impressed that Billington had managed to reconcile Elizabeth verse "with a medium whose drama is usually naturalistic, even documentary". Arthur Unger called Bloom "hauntingly vulnerable" as part of a larger "brave and bravura production". For R. Scott Colley, the play came alive on the small screen, being well-suited to "that half-musing quality" of the play's monologues. Colley felt it to be one of the highlights of the first series, becoming "good melodrama and excellent television". The Shakespeare Association of America voted this production the best of the entire series.

=== Season 2 ===
==== The First Part of King Henry the Fourth, with the life and death of Henry surnamed Hotspur ====
- Directed by David Giles
- Produced by Cedric Messina
- Directed by Don Homfray
- Taping dates: 7–12 March 1979
- First transmitted in the UK: 9 December 1979
- First transmitted in the US: 26 March 1980
- Running time (PAL DVD): 147 minutes

Cast

- Jon Finch as King Henry the Fourth
- David Gwillim as Henry, Prince of Wales
- Rob Edwards as Prince John of Lancaster
- David Buck as Earl of Westmorland
- Robert Brown as Sir Walter Blunt
- Clive Swift as Thomas Percy, Earl of Worcester
- Bruce Purchase as Henry Percy, Earl of Northumberland
- Tim Pigott-Smith as Henry 'Hotspur' Percy
- Robert Morris as Edmund Mortimer, Earl of March
- John Cairney as Archibald, Earl of Douglas
- David Neal as Scroop, Archbishop of York
- Norman Rutherford as Sir Michael
- Richard Owens as Owen Glendower
- Terence Wilton as Sir Richard Vernon
- Anthony Quayle as Sir John Falstaff
- Jack Galloway as Poins
- Gordon Gostelow as Bardolph
- Steven Beard as Peto
- Michele Dotrice as Lady Percy
- Sharon Morgan as Lady Mortimer
- Brenda Bruce as Mistress Quickly
- Mike Lewin as First Carrier
- David Bailie as Second Carrier
- Douglas Milvain as Chamberlain
- Neville Barber as Sheriff
- George Winter as Servant to Hotspur
- Michael Heath as First Messenger
- Malcolm Hughes as Second Messenger

===== Behind the scenes =====
The week prior to the screening of this episode in both the UK and the US, the first-season episode King Richard the Second was repeated as a lead-in to the trilogy. The episode also began with Richard's death scene from the previous play.

Anthony Quayle returned to the role of Falstaff almost thirty years after first playing him at the Festival of Britain. His performance was more humanised in this later version. Falstaff, as the character who exists on a more meta-theatrical level, is the only character to speak directly to camera. Giles used a narrow lens during battle scenes, both to keep the combatants clear in the front of the frame and to reduce the depth of field, so the limited studio sets were blurred in the background. Tim-Pigott Smith noted that the fight choreography was specifically targeted at rejecting any notion of nobility in the battles, both large and small.

Cedric Messina saw the Henriad as a "sort of Curse of the House of Atreus in English". In considering character motivation, Giles learned that Prince Hal had been given, by his father, as a hostage to Richard II during the latter's trip to Ireland, to ensure his father's loyalty. Richard treated Hal very well, and Giles wondered if this was one reason for Hal's reaction against his father before and during this play.

The Prefaces to Shakespeare episode for The First Part of King Henry the Fourth was presented by Michael Redgrave who had played Hotspur in a 1951 RSC production directed by Anthony Quayle. The Shakespeare in Perspective episode was presented by musician, art historian and critic George Melly.

===== Reception =====
Christian Williams, in the Washington Post, stated that while the production takes about half an hour to build, it was filled with well-played tender moments, such as the Welsh song by Lady Mortimer, and "vast edifices of hilarity that crumble into depth and moral ambiguity". Williams also praised the "majestic slaughter and crushing impact" of the battlefield scenes. In the Boston Globe, William A. Henry considered this the best television production of the play likely to be seen. Diana Loercher, in Christian Science Monitor, praised Gwillim and Quayle alongside a production that was "immensely worthwhile". However she criticised the BBC and PBS for failing to provide an introductory summary, perhaps by a figure such as Alistair Cooke, for viewers who would not have the historical background. Russell Davies, in The Times, also praised Quayle, who "perfectly caught" Falstaff's insecurity.

Clive James found the production "good, solid, worthy stuff, proceeding staunchly between the lower levels of excitement and the upper strata of tedium." James compared Quayle to Orson Welles' notable performance in Chimes at Midnight and came down in Quayle's favour. Rick Groen, in The Globe and Mail, was particularly impressed by Pigott-Smith and Gwillim, and argued that Jon Finch suited the role here much better than in Richard II. The Eastcheap scenes were particularly impressively staged, in James's opinion, with compliment also given to Clive Swift as a "dryly ironic" Worcester. However he wished for more imaginative use of the camera.

Samuel Crowl found a lot of good, especially in Gwillim using his "remarkably wide and expressive mouth" to capture Hal, with a twinkle in his personality as he began Hal's character arc. Crowl liked Giles's use of close-ups although ultimately declared that despite the director's talent, even he couldn't fit the "massive energies" of the play on the screen. Crowl was dismissive of Finch, whose "range of expression appears to extend from dread to dread", using hand gestures that were embarrassing and amateurish in lieu of finding a character. "The production's battle scenes are studio-stilted' but ultimately the play emerged with more life than most in the Messina run. Crowl saw Quayle's Falstaff as a performance most interesting when speaking to camera, which made both the text and the character come alive. By contrast, John J. O'Connor, in the New York Times, disliked the direct address to camera, which took away from the sense of lived-in characters. O'Connor found the battle scenes to be lacking in scope but praised Pigott-Smith who "exudes energy even while in repose" and Quayle for tapping into "an intriguing vein of melancholy in the character" and giving a performance that was "intelligent and splendidly theatrical."

In The Spectator, Richard Ingrams was also frustrated by Finch's hand scratching as a character trait. More importantly he felt that Quayle was the wrong casting, lacking the "ripeness" of someone like Leo McKern. Ingrams decided that Quayle's casting exemplified a "certain lack of daring" with the first season, as if "the producers were above all anxious to sell the films to the American educational channel for use in schools".

==== The Second Part of King Henry the Fourth containing his Death: and the Coronation of King Henry the Fift ====
- Directed by David Giles
- Produced by Cedric Messina
- Designed by Don Homfray
- Taping dates: 11–16 April 1979
- First transmitted in the UK: 16 December 1979
- First transmitted in the US: 9 April 1980
- Running time (PAL DVD): 150 minutes

Cast

- Jon Finch as King Henry the Fourth
- David Gwillim as Henry, Prince of Wales
- Rob Edwards as Prince John of Lancaster
- Martin Neil as Prince Humphrey of Gloucester
- Roger Davenport as Thomas, Duke of Clarence
- Bruce Purchase as Earl of Northumberland
- David Neal as Scroop, Archbishop of York
- Michael Miller as Lord Mowbray
- Richard Bebb as Lord Hastings
- John Humphry as Lord Bardolph
- Salvin Stewart as Sir John Colville
- David Strong as Travers
- Carl Oatley as Morton
- Rod Beacham as Earl of Warwick
- David Buck as Earl of Westmoreland
- Brian Poyser as Gower
- Ralph Michael as Lord Chief Justice
- Anthony Quayle as Sir John Falstaff
- Jack Galloway as Poins
- Gordon Gostelow as Bardolph
- Bryan Pringle as Pistol
- Steven Beard as Peto
- John Fowler as Page to Sir John Falstaff
- Robert Eddison as Justice Robert Shallow
- Leslie French as Justice Silence
- Raymond Platt as Davy, Servant to Shallow
- Frederick Proud as Fang, Sheriff's Officer
- Julian Battersby as Ralph Mouldy
- Roy Herrick as Simon Shadow
- Alan Collins as Thomas Wart
- John Tordoff as Francis Feeble
- Roger Elliott as Peter Bullcalf
- Jenny Laird as Lady Northumberland
- Michele Dotrice as Lady Percy, Hotspur's Widow
- Brenda Bruce as Hostess Quickly
- Frances Cuka as Doll Tearsheet
- Tim Brown as Servant to Lord Chief Justice
- Colin Dunn as Messenger

===== Behind the scenes =====
This episode starts with a reprise of the death of Richard, followed by an excerpt from the first-season episode King Richard the Second. Rumour's opening soliloquy is then heard in voice-over, played over scenes from the previous week's The First Part of King Henry the Fourth; Henry's lamentation that he has not been able to visit the Holy Land, and the death of Hotspur at the hands of Prince Hal. With over a quarter of the lines from the Folio text cut, this production had more material omitted than any other in the entire series. Scholars suspect that Shakespeare didn't know precisely what illness King Henry developed. Medieval texts, such as the Brut Chronicle suggest it was a combination of leprosy and syphilis, which was reflected in the make-up for the character as he becomes more unwell. However modern scholars generally dismiss the idea that the King suffered from leprosy. Giles used a higher number of reverse-angle, over-the-shoulder shots than in Richard II, creating a more tense atmosphere than was usually achieved under Messina's "house style".

The Prefaces to Shakespeare episode for The Second Part of King Henry the Fourth was presented by Anthony Quayle who portrayed Falstaff in the BBC adaptation, and had also played the role several times on-stage, included a celebrated 1951 RSC production, which he directed with Michael Redgrave. The Shakespeare in Perspective episode was presented by psychologist Fred Emery.

===== Reception =====
Laurence Christon, in the Los Angeles Times, led the charge against the production, calling it "very long and very dull ... the worst kind of Shakespeare in its deadly reverence for the word and its mediocre response to the spirit". Mark Crispin Miller, in The Nation, broadly agreed, saying that Quayle's performance as Falstaff was "one long coy wheeze", with only Jon Finch deserving credit in a performance "of isolated brilliance" as the guilt-ridden King. John J. O'Connor, in the New York Times, found strong performances from the lead trio of actors but complained that the production moved at a snail's pace, blaming Shakespeare's text and suggesting "some of the plays may not deserve a full-scale production". For David Bevington, this was a "generally sturdy but uninspiring" production, marred by the unconvincing filming techniques for the battle sequences. Michael Church, in the London Times, compared this production favourably to the Royal Shakespeare Company's televised productions. While acknowledging that the RSC was reaching new audiences, Church noted that—compared to the BBC productions—the RSC's "approach is often mannered in the extreme".

Many reviewers were more positive. William A. Henry had been deeply impressed by The First Part but felt that The Second Part somehow managed to surpass it. To him, Giles as director had found the "maundering intimacy and pathos ... without muting any of the roaring laughter". Henry praised Quayle for treating "the richest moments with the utmost simplicity", particularly in his scenes withsDoll and Shallow, and also singled out Robert Eddington as Shallow, who carried the audience on a journey. He credited Dotrice and Bruce with strong characterisations, although found Gwillim too "blandly pretty" and Finch "too histrionic in his madness". By contrast, Michael Kernan, in the Washington Post, felt that the portrayal of King Henry IV was the highlight, saying that "Finch takes hold of the play with complete authority and never lets it go". Maurice Charney, in Shakespeare Quarterly, found Quayle especially convincing and noted that Michele Dotrice made her sequences as Lady Percy "unforgettable". Samuel Crowl greatly disliked the many "unnecessary interjections" Quayle added to his lines as Falstaff, which seemed at odds with the brilliant character who shouldn't have to reach for the right word. By contrast, T. F. Wharton argues that Quayle's performance choice creates a Falstaff who fills every space, "not only physically but vocally".

G. M. Pearce, in Cahiers Élisabéthains, noted the sequences in Shallow's orchard and the design which "gave these delightful scenes an added feeling of authenticity". In Time, Gerald said that Gwillim "adroitly captures all Hal's contradictions", while Quayle makes Falstaff's character "not only simple but natural". Clive James argued the production worked in no small part because Giles did not impose a strong interpretation but 'the writing was allowed to do most of the work". James noted that Gwillim, as Prince Hal, had an ear for rhythm as well as the benefit of "a face out of a Renaissance portrait". For Peter Saccio, this was the most absorbing of the four productions in Giles's Henriad. Saccio acknowledged Finch's hand-rubbing as a deliberate character choice, carrying different symbols across the two parts. He found much to like in the smaller roles, such as Poins and the Archbishop, while noting Gwillim's "extraordinarily expressive mouth" when acting. Ultimately, Saccio believed that the use of the television camera allowed Giles to capture the personal struggles and political subtleties that make up the play.

==== The Life of Henry the Fift ====
- Directed by David Giles
- Produced by Cedric Messina
- Designed by Don Homfray
- Taping dates: 18–25 June 1979
- First transmitted in the UK: 23 December 1979
- First transmitted in the US: 23 April 1980
- Running time (PAL DVD): 163 minutes

Cast

- Alec McCowen as Chorus
- David Gwillim as King Henry the Fifth
- Martin Smith as Duke of Gloucester
- Rob Edwards as Duke of Bedford
- Roger Davenport as Duke of Clarence
- Clifford Parrish as Duke of Exeter
- Derek Hollis as Duke of York
- Robert Ashby as Earl of Salisbury
- David Buck as Earl of Westmoreland
- Rob Beacham as Earl of Warwick
- Trevor Baxter as Archbishop of Canterbury
- John Abineri as Bishop of Ely
- William Whymper as Earl of Cambridge
- Ian Price as Lord Scroop
- George Howe as Sir Thomas Erpingham
- David Rowlands as Sir Thomas Grey
- Brian Poyser as Gower
- Tim Wylton as Fluellen
- Paddy Ward as MacMorris
- Michael McKevitt as Jamy
- Ronald Forfar as Bates
- Joe Ritchie as Court
- David Pinner as Williams
- Jeffrey Holland as Nym
- Gordon Gostelow as Bardolph
- Bryan Pringle as Pistol
- John Fowler as Boy
- Simon Broad as Herald
- Thorley Walters as Charles the Sixth, King of France
- Keith Drinkel as Lewis, the Dauphin
- Robert Harris as Duke of Burgundy
- John Saunders as Duke of Orléans
- John Bryans as Duke of Bourbon
- Julian Glover as The Constable of France
- Carl Forgione as Rambures
- Alan Brown as Governor of Harfleur
- Garrick Hagon as Montjoy, a French Herald
- Pamela Ruddock as Isabel, Queen of France
- Jocelyne Boisseau as Katherine, Daughter to Charles and Isabel
- Anna Quayle as Alice
- Brenda Bruce as Hostess
- Graham Pountney as French Soldier
- Ronald Chenery as Messenger

===== Behind the scenes =====
Director David Giles and production designer Don Homfray both felt this episode should look different from the two Henry IV plays. While they had been focused on rooms and domestic interiors, Henry V was focused on large open spaces. As such, because they could not shoot on location, and because creating realistic reproductions of such spaces in a studio was not possible, they decided on a more stylised approach to production design than had hitherto been seen in the series. Ironically, the finished product looked more realistic than either of them had anticipated or desired. Giles felt that the play was the least naturalistic of the tetralogy, in part because of the role of the Chorus, and in part because King Henry is a role-player. The stylisation was especially pronounced in the scenes of the French court, with both nonrepresentational sets and a larger style of acting. Costume designer Odette Barrow received heraldry advice from Charles Kightly from the Royal College of Arms, an authority on the Battle of Agincourt. As this production was designed to be the conclusion of a trilogy, describing the growth of Henry from prince to king, rather than a standalone drama, Messina was happy for cuts to be made which lessened the ambiguity of Henry's goodness. Messina said, "The speech he makes threatening the people of Harfleur is absolutely awful."

The episode was repeated on Saint George's Day (23 April) in 1980.

The Prefaces to Shakespeare episode for The Life of Henry the Fift was presented by Robert Hardy who had played Henry V in the 1960 BBC television series An Age of Kings. The Shakespeare in Perspective episode was presented by politician Alun Gwynne Jones.

===== Reception =====
Paul M. Cubeta, in Shakespeare on Film Newsletter, gave a highly positive review, finding Gwillim "splendid" playing a King full of inscrutable edges, "most persuasive in creating a unity of the double-reflecting self of Henry as king and man". He enjoyed the actors playing the French court and also Alec McCowen's Chorus playing a kind of "Alistair Cooke smugly providing exposition" while embracing the unreliable nature of the character. Cubeta appreciated that Giles wasn't intimidated by the legend of Laurence Olivier's film version, skillfully creating the sense of larger spaces in spite of the difficulty of battle sequences on the small screen. "The one silent close-up of the Boy dead, says more about the victory of Agincourt" than all the battle scenes that could be shot. John J. O'Connor, in the New York Times, found the production "solid, unfussy, intelligent", noting the money that was clearly spent on "some splendid costumes". O'Connor had found Gwillim uncomfortable as Prince Hal but found he emerged here as "a thoroughly admirable Henry". O'Connor had particular praise for Wylton, Pringle, and Anna Quayle's "exquisite cameo", and noted Boisseau's Katherine as "a model of captivating innocence". G. M. Pearce, in Cahiers Élisabéthains, liked McCowen's "intensity and suppressed excitement" and Boisseau's comic timing and "great charm", but was disappointed that the "steely interior" Gwillim hinted at with his character in the preceding plays didn't emerge here.

Other reviews were muted. Cecil Smith, for the Los Angeles Times, enjoyed the production but found it "solidly professional ... rather academic in approach and a bit too stage-bound", with disappointment that Gwillim's Henry V was "underplayed and rather soft of tone and manner". Mark Crispin Miller, in The Nation, strongly disliked the realistic props and sets, comparing those with the blank stage of Shakespeare's audience, which allowed for a greater play on the audience's imaginations and increased richness of performance. In Miller's view, the BBC had chosen to please its American funders and had "bowdlerised this difficult character [King Henry], turning the 'warlike Harry' into a really nice person". Gwillim, in Miller's view, made even his condemning the would-be assassins to death into a mawkish scene. For Donn Downey, in The Globe and Mail, Boisseau was the most charming aspect of a production that largely didn't convince. He believed that Gwillim was too young to convincingly portray the adult Henry, which made him into everything the French Dauphin claims of the character: "This Henry really belongs at the senior prom ... not in the front ranks leading a force of Englishmen into battle".

William A. Henry had praise for the supporting cast, including Fowler, Bruce, Wylton, and Boisseau, but was disappointed by Gwillim. While acknowledging the actor's talent, Henry saw Gwillim as creating a snob and not a compelling character, without which "there is not much of a play". His thesis was that, although using the same actor across all three plays made sense, it wasn't the best way to achieve good performances of each of the separate plays. Ultimately, Henry found that Giles "shows little of the interpretative genius" he brought to the three preceding plays.

==== Twelfth Night ====
- Directed by John Gorrie
- Produced by Cedric Messina
- Designed by Don Taylor
- Taping dates: 16–21 May 1979
- First transmitted in the UK: 6 January 1980
- First transmitted in the US: 27 February 1980
- Running time (PAL DVD): 128 minutes

Cast

- Alec McCowen as Malvolio
- Robert Hardy as Sir Toby Belch
- Felicity Kendal as Viola
- Annette Crosbie as Maria
- Sinéad Cusack as Olivia
- Trevor Peacock as Feste
- Clive Arrindell as Orsino
- Ronnie Stevens as Sir Andrew Aguecheek
- Robert Lindsay as Fabian
- Maurice Roëves as Antonio
- Michael Thomas as Sebastian
- Malcolm Reynolds as Valentine
- Ryan Michael as Curio
- Ric Morgan as Sea Captain
- Arthur Hewlett as Priest
- Daniel Webb as Servant
- Andrew MacLachlan as First Officer
- Peter Holt as Second Officer
- Jean Channon as Waiting Woman

===== Behind the scenes =====
Director John Gorrie interpreted Twelfth Night as an English country house comedy, and incorporated influences ranging from Luigi Pirandello's play Il Gioco delle Parti to ITV's Upstairs, Downstairs. Gorrie also set the play during the English Civil War in the hopes the use of cavaliers and roundheads would help focus the dramatisation of the conflict between festivity and Puritanism. Gorrie wanted the episode to be as realistic as possible, and in designing Olivia's house, made sure that the geography of the building was practical. He then shot the episode in such a way that the audience becomes aware of the logical geography, often shooting characters entering and exiting doorways into rooms and corridors.

The Prefaces to Shakespeare episode for Twelfth Night was presented by Dorothy Tutin who had played Viola in a 1958 RSC production directed by Peter Hall. The Shakespeare in Perspective episode was presented by painter and poet David Jones.

===== Reception =====
Cecil Smith, in the Los Angeles Times, called the production "a spirited, joyful romp". G. M. Pearce, writing in Cahiers Élisabéthains, enjoyed the "cheerful, vigorous" production, impressed that it did a more successful job in explaining for the audience the relative social positions of the characters than most stage productions. The Guardian called it "one of the joys of the winter", sensitively directed, in an otherwise patchy season. For Maurice Charney, Gorrie's production was "modest but very satisfying", with Taylor's sets creating a very strong sense of a household going about its business, and filled with "country charm". Charney noted McCowen's "wonderfully restrained and intelligent" performance, and said that the story unfolded "with a believable authenticity".

Some reviews were more equivocal. John J. O'Connor, in the New York Times, viewed the production as "solid and, not infrequently, admirable", feeling that the comic subplots were the highlights. O'Connor noted the seeming stone steps which creaked when walked on, revealing their fake nature. He found that Arrindell "looks pretty but is naggingly insubstantial" and that McCowen never made anything specific os Malvolio, who "remains a stranger among the other characters". Diana Loercher, in Christian Science Monitor, felt that overall the production "lights up the television screen like a Roman candle", with praise for Stevens and McCowen (whom she viewed as the comic highlight), and appreciation that the twins had a superficial resemblance. While appreciating Cusack's portrayal of Olivia as "appropriately beautiful and haughty", Loercher felt that Cusack never convinced the audience with her passion for Cesario, and was disappointed by Arrindell's "petulant delivery" as Orsino.

The Chicago Tribune opined that the comic subplot was "almost a complete dud" but enjoyed the Viola plot's 'sentimental humour". Ultimately, Larry Kart argued that Shakespeare's theatrical reliance on fast-moving verse and dense language is at odds with the visual-first focus of television, and that the most successful moments were where the screen could get inside a character's mind, as when Viola tells Orsino about "Cesario"'s past love. In Shakespeare on Film Newsletter, Virginia M. Carr was disappointed that Gorrie didn't find the darker elements of the play's subtext, and doubted that audiences unfamiliar with the play would understand the theatrical conventions—such as a woman in disguise who still looks like a woman. Nevertheless, she concluded that Gorrie was most successful with the "themes of madness and lost identity". William A. Henry, in the Boston Globe, was dismissive: he found McCowen's Malvolio to be lacking in humour and the comic subplot devoid of "warm and devoted" characterisations, while the rest of the play felt too "earthbound when it ought to caper in caprice".

==== The Tempest ====
- Directed by John Gorrie
- Produced by Cedric Messina
- Designed by Paul Joel
- Taping dates: 23–28 July 1979
- First transmitted in the UK: 27 February 1980
- First transmitted in the US: 7 May 1980
- Running time (PAL DVD): 124 minutes

Cast

- Michael Hordern as Prospero
- Derek Godfrey as Antonio
- David Waller as Alonso
- Warren Clarke as Caliban
- Nigel Hawthorne as Stephano
- David Dixon as Ariel
- Andrew Sachs as Trinculo
- John Nettleton as Gonzalo
- Alan Rowe as Sebastian
- Pippa Guard as Miranda
- Christopher Guard as Ferdinand
- Kenneth Gilbert as Boatswain
- Edwin Brown as Master
- Paul Greenhalgh as Francisco
- Christopher Bramwell as Adrian
- Gwyneth Lloyd as Juno
- Elizabeth Gardner as Ceres
- Judith Rees as Iris

===== Behind the scenes =====
The episode used a 360-degree set, which allowed actors to move from the beach to the cliff to the orchard without edits. The orchard was composed of real apple trees. The visual effects seen in this episode were not developed for use here. They had been developed for Top of the Pops and Doctor Who. John Gielgud was originally cast as Prospero, but contractual conflicts delayed the production, and by the time Messina had sorted them out, Gielgud was unavailable.

The Prefaces to Shakespeare episode for The Tempest was presented by Michael Hordern who portrayed Prospero in the BBC adaptation. The Shakespeare in Perspective episode was presented by philosopher Laurens van der Post.

===== Reception =====
Eric Paice gave the production a rave review in The New Statesman calling Gorrie's direction "virtually flawless", and saying that this Tempest understands that the best way to present Shakespeare on television is "to stand back and let the narrative tell its own tale without production gimmicks". Clive James felt that, even in a minimalist set, Hordern was "magical enough to transigure his surroundings" and spoke the role of Prospero better than James had heard before. The young lovers were "suitably enchanting" Blaik Kirby, in The Globe and Mail, found it "a gentle and beautifully clear version" of the play, suited to the television screen, and led by a "finely weighted performance" from Hordern, who found the balance between speaking the lines with rhythm and with sense for the audience. Kirby found the young lovers "sensitive and adoring" and praised Clarke for finding humanity and sensitivity without negating Caliban's brutish nature. In the Boston Globe, William A. Henry also praised Hordern for making the role of Prospero "as dark and complex as Lear or Hamlet, as noble as Brutus or Macduff". Henry appreciated that Gorrie didn't try to make Prospero an evil colonialist, nor simplify the native characters. He found Dixon's design as Ariel to resemble "a Christian avenging angel from some Flemish Renaissance painting" and Clarke's Caliban to resemble "some Rubens tosspot from the paintings of drunken Silenus".He also appreciated Joel's set and choreographer Geoffrey Cauley's Elizabethan masque, concluding that the production "looks more like nature than a stage" and, even when it doesn't, "it evokes anew the enchantment of the isle."

Numerous reviewers were much less flattering. Cecil Smith, in the Los Angeles Times, derided the production as "horrendous ... a lead-footed, tedious disaster", and particularly disliked the "embarrassing" pageant of spirits. Maurice Charney believed that "everything goes wrong here" with Hordern miscast, and so "droningly grandfatherish that he puts everyone to sleep as effectively as he does Miranda". Stanley Reynolds, in the London Times, disagreed with Gorrie's decision to avoid strong directorial interpretation calling this "another stiff production aimed at the archives" and "more of the BBC's ghastly middle taste". The New Orleans Times-Picayune was dismissive of the production as a whole but found Hordern "saves the day with his marvelous performance".

John J. O'Connor gave a mixed review in the New York Times, caling the production "hardly unflawed" but that Gorrie "managed to avoid some of the more familiar pitfalls" with his casting and Joel's "generally uncluttered designs". O'Connor appreciated the way Ariel's magic was handled using special effects, but concluded that the pageant felt like "an especially busy weekend at Fire Island". Dominick Grundy, in Shakespeare on Film Newsletter, was disappointed in Hordern's Prospero, feeling he lacked authority as a character, and equally disappointed in the lack of magic conjured by indifferent lighting. Grundy, however, found that the surpporting characters convinced, noting Hawthorne, Sachs and Clarke as a successful comic trio, and finding great conviction in Rowe and Godfrey's performances as the courtiers.

==== Hamlet, Prince of Denmark ====
- Directed by Rodney Bennett
- Produced by Cedric Messina
- Designed by Don Homfray
- Taping dates: 31 January – 8 February 1980
- First transmitted in the UK: 25 May 1980
- First transmitted in the US: 10 November 1980
- Running time (PAL DVD): 214 minutes

Cast

- Derek Jacobi as Hamlet
- Claire Bloom as Gertrude
- Patrick Stewart as Claudius
- Eric Porter as Polonius
- Lalla Ward as Ophelia
- David Robb as Laertes
- Patrick Allen as the Ghost of Hamlet's Father
- Robert Swann as Horatio
- Jonathan Hyde as Rosencrantz
- Geoffrey Bateman as Guildenstern
- Emrys James as First Player (King)
- Jason Kemp as Second Player (Queen)
- Geoffrey Beevers as Third Player (Lucianus)
- Bill Homewood as King in the Mime
- Peter Richards as Queen in the Mime
- Terence McGinity as Murderer in the Mime
- Peter Burroughs as Player
- Stuart Fell as Player
- Ian Charleson as Fortinbras
- Tim Wylton as First Gravedigger
- Peter Benson as Second Gravedigger
- Paul Humpoletz as Marcellus
- Niall Padden as Bernardo
- Christopher Baines as Francisco
- John Humphry as Voltemand
- John Sterland as Cornelius
- Peter Gale as Osric
- Raymond Mason as Reynaldo
- Dan Meaden as Norwegian Captain
- Iain Blair as Sailor
- Reginald Jessup as Messenger
- Michael Poole as Priest
- David Henry as English Ambassador

===== Behind the scenes =====
Originally, director Rodney Bennett had wanted to shoot the production on location, but after the first season, it was decreed that all productions were to be studio-based. Bennett made a virtue of this restriction and his Hamlet, Prince of Denmark "was the first fully stylized production of the series." Bennett himself argued that "though on the face of it, Hamlet would seem to be a great naturalistic play, it isn't really [...] It has reality but it is essentially a theatrical reality. The way to do it is to start with nothing and gradually feed in only what's actually required." As such, the production design was open, with ambiguous space, openings without architectural specificity and emptiness. Susan Willis argues of this episode that it "was the first to affirm a theatre-based style rather than aspiring half-heartedly to the nature of film."

Derek Jacobi commenced this production immediately after a lengthy run on stage in Toby Robertson's production, first at The Old Vic and then on international tour for two years. Jacobi attempted to come at the production with a fresh mind. For example on stage Jacobi's Hamlet had expressed anger when the players perform the dumb show before The Mousetrap, fearing it will ruin his plan to catch Claudius. Here, Bennett believed Hamlet would know what the play contained, so Jacobi altered his performance to show he was expecting a reaction in the dumb show and, when Claudius didn't react, Hamlet began to suspect the ghost had been lying. Jacobi wanted to deliver the 'To be or not to be' speech as a direct address to Ophelia, perhaps even a flirtation, but Bennett rejected this approach.

The production was taped in Studio 1 at BBC Television Centre, at 995m^{2} the second largest TV studio in Britain at the time. Designer Don Homfray used ramps around the circumference of the playing space for the camera, allowing him to give a sense of distance by capturing the floor in the far background. By looking down, it also helped hide the lights above. Just as Hamlet is never sure of what is real, Bennett wanted to keep the architecture vague so things played out in an uncertain space. The walls were insubstantial, with "Rembrandt-inspired" lighting, to create a sense of a world where there is always the chance of being watched or overheard. The only three-dimensional space with solid walls would be, ironically, the stage for the players, which was designed to feel like an Italian renaissance theatre. Bennett and his costume designer, Barbara Kronig, gave things a mid-sixteenth century feel, taking inspiration from Durer and Breughel, to convey the sense of Hamlet being a traditional story that preceded Shakespeare. Kronig used dark greens and blues, so Homfray offset this with greys and steel shades.

The episode was repeated in the US on 31 May 1982. The first screening was the highest-rated production of the entire series in North America, with viewing figures of 5.5 million.

The Prefaces to Shakespeare episode for Hamlet, Prince of Denmark was presented by Derek Jacobi who portrayed Hamlet in the BBC adaptation. The Shakespeare in Perspective episode was presented by journalist Clive James.

===== Reception =====
In the Washington Post, John Lardner championed Bennett's version as "a bold and venturesome production, full of memorable images", especially in the clarity of the climactic sword fight. John J. O'Connor, in the New York Times acknowledged that occasionally the "bare-bones approach falters", such as when there's no place on the open stage for Hamlet and Horatio to hide from the mourners at Ophelia's funeral. But largely he regarded this as a practical and traditional approach to the revenge play, with Jacobi earning "attention and acclaim" and Bloom a "lovely intelligent and sympathetic" Gertrude. He praised Bennett for giving the minor characters distinctive traits, and felt that the combination of screen close-ups and an empty studio set allowed for an "unusual clarity of exposition" for the viewer. However O'Connor stated that both Polonius and Ophelia seemed diminished, and he was disappointed in Robb's under-emotional performance as Laertes and Swann's "self-effacing" Hamlet. Jack Thomas, in the Boston Globe, raved that this production "is a standard of what television can achieve" and made up for previous disappointments in the series, arguing that Jacobi took a role steeped in tradition and brought it to television without sacrificing the impact or the psychology.

For Bernice W. Kliman, this production was a turning point for the series as a whole, at last admitting "the naturally affinity between Shakespeare's stage and the undisguised sound set". Found that the production allowed the play to be acknowledged as an inconsistent piece itself, and that while Jacobi started out excessive, his production cohered until he conveyed "so fully Hamlet's aloneness and vulnerability" on a set that allowed for an acting style that "transcends the 'real'". Cecil Smith, in the Los Angeles Times, noted the production was "stage-bound" but that Jacobi was "a Hamlet you will not soon forget. Clive James's review for The Observer focused on what he felt was a growing problem of actors pronouncing Shakespeare's lines in such a way as to obstruct the rhythm because they were focused on over-explaining every word in the text. Jacobi, he felt, was the biggest culprit (although excellent as the character) while Bloom and Stewart played the dialogue more as the rhythm directed. Nancy Banks-Smith, in the Guardian, was disappointed in what she saw as a studio-bound production too determined to be theatrical instead of televisual. H. R. Coursen said that Bloom nicely navigated the level of obliviousness that Gertrude has to her husband's activities, as well as praising the performance of Emrys James. He found Ward "undistinguished" and, although he enjoyed Stewart's performance, felt that the prayer scene was raced through so that it was unclear what conclusion Claudius had come to. Coursen declared that this was one of the best productions of Hamlet likely to be seen outside of the theatre.

Richard Ingrams, in The Spectator, said that the production was "neither film nor play" with 'no real malevolence" in Stewart's portrayal of Claudio and Jacobi "a conventional kind of Prince". Ingrams commended the "lack of gimmickry" but felt that what viewers got was uninspired. Kenneth Rothwell assessed the production as only coming alive when Jacobi and Bloom shared the stage, but otherwise found it uninventive. Rothwell criticised the length, and a cast who "were auditonining for roles in Hamlet but not performing Hamlet". In particular, he found Jacobi to be a return to nineteenth-century neurotic Hamlets rather than offering a fresh interpretation. He noted that it may have been too early to see Jacobi in another major Shakespeare tragedy, as he saw traces of the "petulant" Richard II in his Hamlet, which led the viewer to feel sympathetic to Claudius. Rothwell also questioned the theatrical approach, feeling it made no sense for the graveyard to be a stylised open space yet for the grave to remain real, complete with dirt.

Rick Groen, in The Globe and Mail, found Bennett's Hamlet "easier to admire than love", "rich in substance but poor in imagination." He cited Jacobi's performance as being a completely accessible but complex portrayal that "will delight high-school teachers everywhere", and felt the cast was generally strong. Standouts were Porter, "refreshingly subdued: as a more compassionate Polonius than usual, and Bloom expertly navigating the emotional intensity of the play. While having no problem with the stark sets, Groen was disappointed in Bennett's camera that seemed to be wielded with "inertia", conventionally staging even the most intense scenes such as the arrival of the Ghost.

=== Season 3 ===
==== The Taming of the Shrew ====
- Directed by Jonathan Miller
- Produced by Jonathan Miller
- Designed by Colin Lowrey
- Taping dates: 18–24 June 1980
- First transmitted in the UK: 23 October 1980
- First transmitted in the US: 26 January 1981
- Running time (PAL DVD): 126 minutes

Cast

- Simon Chandler as Lucentio
- Anthony Pedley as Tranio
- John Franklyn-Robbins as Baptista
- Frank Thornton as Gremio
- Sarah Badel as Katherine
- Jonathan Cecil as Hortensio
- Susan Penhaligon as Bianca
- Harry Waters as Biondello
- John Cleese as Petruchio
- David Kincaid as Grumio
- Bev Willis as Baptista's Servant
- Angus Lennie as Curtis
- Harry Webster as Nathaniel
- Gil Morris as Philip
- Leslie Sarony as Gregory
- Derek Deadman as Nicholas
- Denis Gilmore as Peter
- John Bird as Pedant
- Alan Hay as Tailor
- David Kinsey as Haberdasher
- John Barron as Vincentio
- Joan Hickson as Widow
- Tony Martell as Officer

===== Behind the scenes =====
The interior of Baptista's house; the set design is taken almost verbatim from Vermeer's The Music Lesson.

The production was at least partially based on Miller's own 1972 Chichester Festival stage production starring Joan Plowright and Anthony Hopkins, and as with all of the episodes Jonathan Miller directed, he allowed the work of celebrated artisans to influence his design concepts. In the case of Shrew, the street set was based on the work of architect Sebastiano Serlio, as well as the Teatro Olimpico, designed by Andrea Palladio. Baptista's living room was modelled closely on Vermeer's The Music Lesson.

The casting of John Cleese as Petruchio was not without controversy. Cleese had never performed Shakespeare before, and was not a fan of the first two seasons of the BBC Television Shakespeare. As such, he took some persuading from Miller that the BBC Shrew would not be, as Cleese feared "about a lot of furniture being knocked over, a lot of wine being spilled, a lot of thighs being slapped and a lot of unmotivated laughter." Miller told Cleese that the episode would interpret Petruchio as an early Puritan more concerned with attempting to show Kate how preposterous her behaviour is ("showing her an image of herself" as Miller put it), rather than bullying her into submission, and as such, the part was not to be acted along the traditional lines of the swaggering braggart a la Richard Burton in Franco Zeffirelli's 1967 film adaptation. According to Cleese, who consulted a psychiatrist who specialised in treating "shrews," "Petruchio doesn't believe in his own antics, but in the craftiest and most sophisticated way he needs to show Kate certain things about her behaviour. He takes one look at her and realises that here is the woman for him, but he has to go through the process of 'reconditioning' her before anything else. So he behaves just as outrageously as she does in order to make her aware of the effect that her behaviour has on other people [...] Kate needs to be made happy – she is quite clearly unhappy at the beginning of the play, and then extremely happy at the end because of what she has achieved with Petruchio's help." Miller also researched how troublesome children were treated at the Tavistock Clinic, where imitation was often used during therapy; "there are ways in which a skilful therapist will gently mock a child out of a tantrum by giving an amusing imitation of the tantrum immediately after its happened. The child then has a mirror held up to it and is capable of seeing what it looks like to others." In his review of the adaptation for the Financial Times, Chris Dunkley referred to this issue, calling Cleese's Petruchio "an eccentrically pragmatic social worker using the wayward client's own doubtful habits to calm her down." Actress Sarah Badel had a similar conception of the psychology behind the production. She constructed an "imaginary biography" for Katherina, arguing, "She's a woman of such passion [...] a woman of such enormous capacity for love that the only way she could be happy is to find a man of equal capacity. Therefore she's mad for lack of love [...] he feigns madness, she is teetering on the edge of it. Petruchio is the only man who shows her what she's like."

Miller was determined that the adaptation not become a farce, and in that vein, two key texts for him during production were Lawrence Stone's The Family, Sex and Marriage in England: 1500–1800 and Michael Walzer's The Revolution of the Saints, which he used to help ground his interpretation of the play in recognisably Renaissance-esque societal terms; Petruchio's actions are based on accepted economic, social and religious views of the time, as are Baptista's. In tandem with this interpretation, the song sung at the end of the play is a musical version of Psalm 128 ("Blessed is everyone that feareth the Lord"), which was often sung in Puritan households at the end of a meal during Shakespeare's own day, and which praised a peaceful family life. Speaking of the addition of the psalm, Miller states "I had to give [the conclusion] an explicitly religious format, so people could see it as not just simply the high-jinks of an intolerantly selfish man who was simply destroying a woman to satisfy his own vanity, but a sacramental view of the nature of marriage, whereby this couple had come to love each other by reconciling themselves to the demands of a society which saw obedience as a religious requirement."

Miller chose not to include the 'Induction' sequence from Shakespeare's script, which presents the rest of the play as a fiction being performed for a drunken tinker named Christopher Sly. He believed that the inherently theatrical and "folk style" device of the framing narrative would be difficult to do on television, as well as making the characters within the main story seeming like "actors in a story" rather than real people for the audience to identify with. With his camera, Miller focused on depth of field, using a telephoto lens and often placing characters in the front, middle, and back of a shot. This was intended to ensure the characters were always located within the world around them, and to show their actions emerging out of their culture. This episode premiered the new opening title sequence, and the new theme music by Stephen Oliver.

The Prefaces to Shakespeare episode for The Taming of the Shrew was presented by Paola Dionisotti who had played Katherina in a 1978 RSC production directed by Michael Bogdanov. The Shakespeare in Perspective episode was presented by author and journalist Penelope Mortimer.

===== Reception =====
Chris Dunkley, in the Financial Times, applauded the "beautiful" Dutch school interiors, and believed that Miller succeeded in the making the story "less deeply misogynistic than usual, more like a single peculiar case history and less of a general attack on women." Michael Ratcliffe, in the London Times, praised Badel's intelligence in the role and said that Cleese's restraint "gave the show a fine, dangerous edge". In The Listener, Andrew Sinclair declared the production "as fresh and appealing as Shakespeare could possibly be", and was convinced that Badel's Katherine acted the way she was to fight against "the conspiracy of men". David Sterritt, in Christian Science Monitor, said that Cleese proved himself with a performance "precise, carefully modulated, and ever-so-slightly insane". The Globe and Mail praised Miller's takeover of the series for breathing new life into the series, and for using the intimacy of the camera and the technical innovations of television in a way it believed previous directors had not. The Guardian praised the supporting work of Cecil, Franklyn-Robbins, and the improvisations of Bird, as well as being pleased to see former musical hall star Sarony making the most of a small role as Gregory.

David Cuthbert, in the New Orleans Times-Picayune, found Miller's staging "quietly, unfailingly ingenious", especially in the way that Badel had developed her Kate within the framework of an Elizabethan worldview. G. M. Pearce, in Cahiers Élisabéthains, felt that the final scene was more convincing than usual because it was clear that Kate, although forced to be with Petruchio, found a husband she really could love and respect by play's end. In the New York Times, John J. O'Connor was impressed with the Vermeer inspiration as "a very effective neutral territory" for an interpretation that explored the play's gender politics. Although he felt that Cleese at times did not bring out the beauty of the language, speaking "less trippingly on the tongue than conversationally on the ear", he appreciated that the play's words were comprehensible, including most of the puns. Kenneth Rothwell said that Sarony and Pedley stole their scenes in supporting roles, and that Cleese successfully eliminated memories of previous interpreters of Petruchio. He appreciated Miller's use of blocking within static camera frames, and his intelligent editing: this was "not only good theatre but adroit television. In the Observer, John Naughton found Cleese "a brilliant piece of casting" that utilised audience expectations of Basil Fawlty yet turned them puritanical so that Petruchio was "almost Cromwellian". He also enjoyed Pedley, Thornton, and "gorgeous" Penhaligon. In Punch, Benny Green greatly enjoyed the relationship between the two lead characters, with Cleese finding comedy as well as despair. When Katherine delivered her final speech, Green said, "I thought I heard the ghostly laughter of Anne Hathaway floating on the night air".

Stanley Wells was greatly disappointed by the omission of the Christopher Sly sequence, stripping the play "of an entire dramatic dimension". He founds the actors' styles too diverse, from Bird's improvisational comedy to Pedley's farce. Although Wells felt both the leads were fantastic as their characters developed an understanding of one another, and Cleese gave a "deeply thoughtful" performance, he concluded that the production was neither especially funny nor inventive, and the Elizabethan framing left the play in an anti-climax with the final scene. Writing elsewhere, Wells recognised that the challenge of Shrew for a director was to find the play's comedy in spite of a long tradition of slapstick and farce. But he felt that Miller only made the play "Elizabethan" by violating the text's authenticity, and that the omission of the Sly sequence changed the nature of the play, which "works against the declared aims of the series." In the Washington Post, Tom Shales admired the two leads, but disliked the rest of the play, which for all its beauty tended "toward antic dullness". Shales disagreed with Miller's choice to have the long takes using the static camera: "a Macy's window approach, and not a particularly telegenic one." In the Spectator, Richard Ingrams declared Cleese's casting an error of judgement, saying that Cleese was not an actor but "a manic puppet capable of portraying only anger and frustration, like Mr. Punch." He was frustrated by the many "distractions" in the performance, with Miller allowing his actors to add interjections, clicking tongues, and other verbal noises. In Shakespeare on Film Newsletter, Irene G. Dash accused Miller of being a misogynist, shackled by a "culture-bound view of women", even though he believed himself to be presenting a "liberated" view of the play. Dash found that, in place of the Christopher Sly framework, Miller used his own directorial interpretation as a frame, but still could not accept a strong, attractive Kate. In the final lines, where Petruchio and Katherine usually leave before Hortensio bemusedly states that Petruchio has "tamed a curst shrew", Miller has the pair remain onstage. Dash felt that their silent presence during line indicated the production agreed with Hortensio's view. Diana E. Henderson was equally unimpressed with Miller's approach, writing, "it was the perfect production to usher in the neo-conservative 1980s" and "this BBC-TV museum piece unabashedly celebrates the order achieved through female submission."

==== The Merchant of Venice ====
- Directed by Jack Gold
- Produced by Jonathan Miller
- Designed by Oliver Bayldon
- Taping dates: 15–21 May 1980
- First transmitted in the UK: 17 December 1980
- First transmitted in the US: 23 February 1981
- Running time (PAL DVD): 157 minutes

Cast

- John Franklyn-Robbins as Antonio
- John Rhys-Davies as Salerio
- Alan David as Solanio
- John Nettles as Bassanio
- Richard Morant as Lorenzo
- Kenneth Cranham as Gratiano
- Gemma Jones as Portia
- Susan Jameson as Nerissa
- Daniel Mitchell as Balthasar
- Warren Mitchell as Shylock
- Marc Zuber as The Prince of Morocco
- Enn Reitel as Lancelot Gobbo
- Joe Gladwin as Old Gobbo
- Roger Martin as Leonardo
- Leslee Udwin as Jessica
- Peter Gale as The Prince of Arragon
- Richard Austin as Antonio's Servant
- Arnold Diamond as Tubal
- Douglas Wilmer as The Duke of Venice
- Shaun Scott as Stephano
- Adrian Harman as Musician

===== Behind the scenes =====
Although this episode screened to little controversy in the UK, in the US, it created a huge furore. As soon as WNET announced the broadcast date, the Holocaust and Executive Committee (HEC) of the Committee to Bring Nazi War Criminals to Justice sent them a letter demanding the show be cancelled. WNET also received protest letters from the Anti-Defamation League (ADL) and B'nai B'rith. Additionally, Morris Schappes, editor of Jewish Currents, wrote an open letter of protest to The New York Times. The HEC stated that Shylock can arouse "the deepest hate in the pathological and prejudiced mind," urging WNET "that reason and a reputable insight into the psychopathology of man will impel you to cancel [the play's] screening." They later stated, "our objection is not to art but to the hate monger, whoever the target [...] This includes the singular and particular work of art which when televised is viewed by millions and alarmingly compounds the spread of hate." The ADL stated that screening the episode would be "providing a forum for a Shylock who would have warmed the heart of Nazi propagandist Julius Streicher." PBS and WNET issued a joint statement citing the protests of Saudi Arabians the previous year regarding the screening of Death of a Princess, a docudrama about the public execution of Princess Mishaal, and quoting PBS president Lawrence K. Grossman; "the healthy way to deal with such sensitivities is to air the concerns and criticism, not to bury or ban them." PBS and WNET also pointed out that both producer Jonathan Miller and actor Warren Mitchell are Jewish. For their part, Miller and director Jack Gold had anticipated the controversy and prepared for it. In the Stone/Hallinan press material, Gold stated, "Shylock's Jewishness in dramatic terms is a metaphor for the fact that he, more than any other character in Venice, is an alien." Miller stated, "it's not about Jews versus Christians in the racial sense; it's the world of legislation versus the world of mercy."

Director Jack Gold chose an unusual presentational method in this episode; completely realistic and authentic costumes, but a highly stylised non-representational set against which the characters contrast; "if you imagine different planes, the thing closest to the camera was the reality of the actor in a real costume – the costumes were totally real and very beautiful – then beyond the actor is a semi-artificial column or piece of wall, and in the distance is the backcloth, which is impressionistic." The backcloths were used to suggest locale without photographic representationalism; they imply air, water, sea, hills, a city, but never actually show anything specific.

Geoff Feld won Best Cameraman at the 1981 BAFTAs for his work on this episode. This was the only production in the series in which no lines of dialogue (from the traditionally-used text) were cut.

The Prefaces to Shakespeare episode for The Merchant of Venice was presented by Timothy West who had played Shylock in a 1980 Old Vic production which he also directed. The Shakespeare in Perspective episode was presented by playwright and screenwriter Wolf Mankowitz.

===== Reception =====
The New York Times found the production a complete success, with an "absolutely riveting" performance by Mitchell, well supported by Jones, Nettles, and Franklyn-Robbins. Kenneth Rothwell admired a "superb" Mitchell, who made Shylock only turn vicious after Jessica leaves him, making it possible for the audience to believe that the character in the early scenes may have attended his bond with Antonio as a "merry sport". Rothwell found that the play handled the Bassanio/Antonio relationship very well, with a deliberately "frivolous" Bassanio who couldn't see what the audience can. Sheldon P. Zitner felt that Gold handled the play well, dealing tactfully with "the tricky sexual subtext" and overall conveying "an ingenious respect for the medium" of television.

In the Guardian, Nancy Banks-Smith praised Mitchell's expressive face and remarked that the costumes were clearly made at great expense. The Christian Science Monitor singled out Jones for her "utterly believable intensity" at Portia, noting that Shakespeare's characters are stereotypical but can be believable under a good cast such as this. G. M. Pearce, in Cahiers Élisabéthains, agreed that the characters are stereotypical, and found Mitchell outstanding at giving depth to a stock figure. Pearce found several of the cast very strong, particularly Udwin's "vehemence and venom", Morant and Jameson, and lighting designer Dennis Channon's "use of chiaroscuro and hazy lighting". In Pearce's view, Nettles played Bassanio too nobly but spoke the verse impeccably. Pearce concluded that Mitchell "will surely be remembered as one of the great Shylocks" and the production was "a stimulating evening's entertainment."

Michael Manheim, in Shakespeare on Film Newsletter, was less supportive, put off by the playing of Jessica as scheming rather than innocent, and feeling that the Shylock scenes missed the important ironies in the text. Mervyn Jones, in the Listener, saw too much "fatuous laughter" to give a sense of the comic, and that the cast did "as little with the characters as they reasonable could". Jones concluded that the production "declines to take a stance on the vexed question of whether the play is anti-Semitic" and as a result offered little of substance to viewers. Writing in the Globe and Mail, Rick Groen judged the production "workmanlike" with static direction, Jones more convincing in drag than as Portia in Belmont, and Mitchell never able to get Shylock beyond the point of caricature. "The result is definitely caviar, but doled out by an uncommitted chef in a diffident mood."

==== All's Well That Ends Well ====
- Directed by Elijah Moshinsky
- Produced by Jonathan Miller
- Designed by David Myerscough-Jones
- Taping dates: 23–29 July 1980
- First transmitted in the UK: 4 January 1981
- First transmitted in the US: 18 May 1981
- Running time (PAL DVD): 142 minutes

Cast

- Celia Johnson as Countess of Rousillion
- Ian Charleson as Bertram
- Michael Hordern as Lafeu
- Angela Down as Helena
- Peter Jeffrey as Parolles
- Kevin Stoney as Countess's Steward
- Donald Sinden as King of France
- Robert Lindsay as First French Lord
- Dominic Jephcott as the Second French Lord
- Paul Brooke as Lavache
- James Simmons as Bachelor
- John Segal as Bachelor
- Peter Sands as Bachelor
- Yves Aubert as Bachelor
- Terence McGinity as First Gentleman
- Max Arthur as Second Gentleman
- Rosemary Leach as Widow of Florence
- Pippa Guard as Diana
- Joolia Cappleman as Mariana
- Nickolas Grace as The Soldier
- Valentine Dyall as The Astringer

===== Behind the scenes =====
Director Elijah Moshinsky worked with the same lighting designer, John Summers, and sound engineer, Derek Miller-Timmins, for all five of his BBC productions. In line with producer Jonathan Miller's aesthetic policy, Moshinsky used the work of artists as visual influence. Of particular importance was Georges de La Tour. Moshinsky showed some of de La Tour's work to lighting technician John Summers, as he wanted to capture the dark/light contrast of the work, as well as the prominence of silhouettes and chiaroscuro effects common in the paintings. Summers loved this idea and worked it into his lighting. For example, he lit the scene where the widow agrees to Helena's wager as if it were illuminated by a single candle. To achieve this, he used a projector bulb hidden by objects on the table to simulate the sense of a single bright light source.

Moshinsky was also very careful about camera placement. The opening shot is a long shot of Helena, before eventually moving into a close-up. Of this opening, Moshinsky commented "I wanted to start with a long shot of Helena and not move immediately to close-up – I didn't want too much identification with her, I wanted a picture of a woman caught in an obsession, with the camera static when she speaks, clear, judging her words. I wanted to start with long shots because I felt they were needed to place people in their context and for the sake of atmosphere. I wanted the atmosphere to help carry the story." With the exception of one shot, every shot in the episode is an interior. The only exterior shot is that of Parolles as he passes the women looking out the window in Florence. The shot is framed in such a way, however, that none of the surroundings are seen. (This was one reason Moshinsky cut the two scenes with the Florentine Duke; along with being extraneous to the plot, they potentially required a sense of the outdoors.) For the shot where the King and Helena dance into the great hall, the scene was shot through a pane of glass which had the ceiling and walls of the hall painted on it, to give the appearance of a much larger and grander room than was actually present. The idea for the scenes between the King and Helena to be so sexually charged was actor Donald Sinden's own. The choice to cast Leach as the Widow was grounded in Moshinsky's desire not to have the role be a cameo from a comic actress, as often seen on stage. He wanted the Widow to be a fully-rounded character whom Helena could learn from.

Moshinsky has made contradictory statements about the end of the play. In the printed script, he indicated he felt that Bertram kissing Helena is a happy ending, but in press material for the US broadcast, he said he found the end to be sombre because none of the young characters had learnt anything. The final epliogue for the King was filmed, with Sinden before a stage curtain in make-up, but ultimately Moshinsky chose to omit it.

The Prefaces to Shakespeare episode for All's Well That Ends Well was presented by Sebastian Shaw who had played the King of France in a 1968 RSC production directed by John Barton. The Shakespeare in Perspective episode was presented by comedian and television writer Barry Took.

===== Reception =====
Michael Billington, in the Guardian was "filled with a radiant over-powering happiness" from the production. Russell Davies, in the London Times particularly appreciated the "memorably brainy performance" from Down. Jeremy Treglown, in the Times Literary Supplement, greatly admired the production except for the implications of the scene where the King is restored to health. As devised by Moshinsky and Donald Sinden on set, the implication was that Helena may have used sexual means to help restore the King's vigour. Treglown found this "goes against the performance of [Helena] otherwise, and steals attention for the hammy Sinden". By contrast, Stanley Kauffmann lauded the scene for its promotion of "Helena's womanliness", helping to remind us that the character is as deserving of male attention as anyone else.

Kenneth Rothwell proclaimed this production "the hit of the season" and a "visual feast", primarily because the director was willing to collaborate with his technical team to make the most of the medium. He enjoyed the running metaphor of mirrors throughout, and the performances of Charleson and Hordern. Rothell concluded that the loss of significant amounts of Shakespeare's text was a fair trade-off for a well-paced performance. Herbert Weil, Jr agreed that this was "one of the best BBC productions", sensitively cast and edited, and that Moshinsky "faces rather than evades the basic problem of the play". His favourite sequence was the return of Helena in the final scene, with the camera capturing each character's response in a way that captures the wonder of the moment. It's a mechanism that could only work on screen and it helps convince us of the sincerity of Bertram's sudden change of heart. Benny Green, in Punch, remarked that Johnson and Down led an "elegantly mounted and intelligently acted" production, with Sinden "conveying regal authority with a voice redolent of adhestive fruitcake". Cecil Smith in the Los Angeles Times called it "a beautiful production ... admirably played". Lon Tuck, in the Washington Post, said that Johnson gave "a performance of real distinction" while "the lights and setting make the most of Down's ephemeral fragility".

In the Observer, Clive James noted that the Dutch imagery was not entirely appropriate for the French setting but felt the production was a "rich brew" that ultimately succeeded because the cast respected Shakespeare's verse. He especially praised Jeffrey's speeches, and concluded that Sinden was too "fruity" as the king but could be forgiven in that particular character. Julian Barnes especially enjoyed Down—"marvellously strong and intelligent"—and Guard, who stole her scenes in a smaller role. But he disliked Charleson, "eccentrically cast" as Bertram, who didn't always seem to know what lines meant. G. M. Pearce echoed this, feeling that Charleson was the "discordant note" in an impressive cast, too sullen and "only believable in the naked lust he portrayed for Diana". John J. O'Connor, in the New York Times, disagreed with this, noting Charleson kept Bertram absorbing "even during his most despicable moments". O'Connor found that the play "works surprisingly well on television", with the lighting deserving awards. He found Sinden "masterfully authoritative and convincing" and appreciated that Moshinsky saw Helena as the Elizabethans would have seen her: "the good woman wronged".

Gordon P. Jones was more critical. He disagreed with Moshinsky's decision to reshape and cut the text, especially omitting much of Lavache and Lafeu's roles. Jones felt that Moshinsky made the play easier to understand, in a negative sense, "because its meaning has been diminished to meet the demands of the mass market".

==== The Winter's Tale ====
- Directed by Jane Howell
- Produced by Jonathan Miller
- Designed by Don Homfray
- Taping dates: 9–15 April 1980
- First transmitted in the UK: 8 February 1981
- First transmitted in the US: 8 June 1981
- Running time (PAL DVD): 173 minutes

Cast

- John Welsh as Archidamus
- David Burke as Camillo
- Robert Stephens as Polixenes
- Jeremy Kemp as Leontes
- Anna Calder-Marshall as Hermione
- Jeremy Dimmick as Mamillius
- Merelina Kendall as Emilia
- Susan Brodrick as Lady to Hermione
- Leonard Kavanagh as Lord to Leontes
- John Bailey as Lord to Leontes
- Cyril Luckham as Antigonus
- William Relton as Lord to Leontes
- Margaret Tyzack as Paulina
- John Benfield as Gaoler/Mariner
- Cornelius Garrett as Servant to Leontes
- John Curless as Cleomenes
- Colin McCormack as Dion
- Emrys Leyshon as Court Official
- Arthur Hewlett as Shepard
- Paul Jesson as Clown
- Harold Goldblatt as Time
- Rikki Fulton as Autolycus
- Robin Kermode as Florizel
- Debbie Farrington as Perdita
- Janette Legge as Dorcas
- Maggie Wells as Mopsa
- Peter Benson as Clown's Servant
- George Howe as Paulina's Servant
- Pat Gorman as Bear

===== Behind the scenes =====
As with all of Jane Howell's productions, this episode was performed on a single set. The change of the seasons, so critical to the movement of the play, is indicated by a lone tree whose leaves change colour as the year moves on, with the background a monochromatic cycloramic curtain, which changed colour in tune with the changing colour of the leaves. Howell directed with a consciousness of the pace of the Elizabethan stage, for example noting that Shakespeare's actors would have been standing unless a seat was called for. Her costume designer, John Peacock, took inspiration from Botticelli for Perdita and from Bruegel for the peasants. Calder-Marshall and Burke were married.

The Prefaces to Shakespeare episode for The Winter's Tale was presented by Anna Calder-Marshall who portrayed Hermione in the BBC adaptation. The Shakespeare in Perspective episode was presented by poet and novelist Stephen Spender.

===== Reception =====
In the Washington Post, Joseph McLellan was impressed that the "essential unreality of the play has been warmly embraced", and that the abstract scenery was appropriate for a story "whose true location is never-never-land". McLellan especially enjoyed the performances of Kemp, Tyzack, and Fulton. Rick Groen, in the Globe and Mail, considered the production the best in the series yet, "impeccable" with a "flawless cast", "wringing every ambiguous note from an eerie chronicle of morality and passion". He believed that Miller taking over as producer had revived the entire series, and Howell's direction dealt well with the alteration of light and shadow.

John J. O'Connor, in the New York Times, concluded that the production allowed Shakespeare's language to emerge beautifully, and was "a delightful surprise" all the more because few viewers would know the play. He especially enjoyed the double act of Jesson and Hewitt. G. M. Pearce, in Cahiers Élisabéthains, admired Howell's design, noting that Leontes's fur coat had echoes of the bear. She enjoyed Dimmick's "delightful" young Mamillius, although observed that little attempt was made to age the adult characters as the play went on.

Anthony Masters, in the London Times, had praise for the lead cast: Tyzack "truly thrilling", Kemp effectively underplaying the role, and Calder-Marshall sensitive as Hermione. But he decided that the pace and set didn't engage the audience. Clive James also questioned the wisdom of the abstract set although overall found the production "worthily done". Julian Barnes, in the Spectator, hailed Howell's admirable direction and the use of direct-to-camera speech for Kemp's Leontes. He concluded that the second half was "at times boringly comic" but that was Shakespeare's fault, not Howell's. Kenneth Rothwell was equivocal, appreciating that the abstract set matched well with Shakespeare's messy geography, and that Howell's directorial approach was intelligent. But ultimately Rothwell believed the direction did not make the most of the text, for example Leontes's sexual jealousy which, in Elizabeth terms, would be equated with the heat of southern climates rather than the cold. Kemp's "laidback style may be best for the intimacy of television" but would have liked to see him escalate some of his anger.

Stanley Wells, in the Times Literary Supplement, found that the set's limitations "deny the romantic liberties of the tale". It made the play seem smaller and flatter than in the theatre, despite Howell's "sensible and fluent direction", with limited interaction between characters. Kemp was too "introverted, properly humourless", sacrificing range in the aim of avoiding going over-the-top, while Stephens gave a mannered performance with "no respect for the pentameter" and Calder-Marshall was sympathetic but didn't fight enough at the trial scene. He enjoyed Luckham, Tyzack, Farrington, and Fulton, but found that shooting the scenes with a lot of cuts, especially in the statue scene, denied some of the wonder that could be obtained from seeing all of the characters react: "the medium has reduced the message". In Shakespeare on Film Newsletter, Donald K. Hedrick, praised the "crisp and restrained" acting, especially the innocence of Farrington's Perdita. But overall he found that the production's elegance got in the way, making the production "timid—as if academics were at the camera controls". Cutting the more boisterous of the dances left the gentler one which gave a "feel of the drawing room". Hedrick also spoke for several reviewers when he expressed disappointment in the "dimestore bear". In the Spectator, Richard Ingrams appreciated Kemp's authoritative Leontes and appreciated Howell's framing, but the play "never looked like taking off". He disliked the "peculiar skateboard set" and Farrington's Pam Ayres accent, and complained that the productions of the BBC series were not "all of a piece".

Ann Jennalie Cook, writing in Shakespeare Bulletin, criticised reviewers for what she saw as a lack of interest in understanding Howell's techniques. Cook defended the acting of Kemp as in line with Howell's approach, to create a claustrophobic, tense, even airless vibe. Cook noted that Howell avoids wide shots that show every character in a scene, "underscoring the partiality, the limitation of perception inherent in the text". As a result, the audience is never omniscient. Leontes, as the most narrow-minded character, is seen in tight frames, whereas the frame widens when Paulina enters, as she has a more rational viewpoint on the action.

==== Timon of Athens ====
- Directed by Jonathan Miller
- Produced by Jonathan Miller
- Designed by Tony Abbott
- Taping dates: 28 January-3 February 1981
- First transmitted in the UK: 16 April 1981
- First transmitted in the US: 14 December 1981
- Running time (PAL DVD): 128 minutes

Cast

- John Fortune as Poet
- John Bird as Painter
- Tony Jay as Merchant
- David Kinsey as Jeweller
- Jonathan Pryce as Timon
- John Welsh as Flavius
- Sebastian Shaw as Old Athenian
- Max Arthur as Lucilius
- Norman Rodway as Apemantus
- Geoffrey Collins as Flaminius
- Terence McGinity as Servilius
- John Shrapnel as Alcibiades
- Hugh Thomas as Lucius
- James Cossins as Lucullus
- Donald Gee as Ventidius
- John Bailey as Sempronius
- Michael Anthony as Caphis
- Bev Willis as Varro's Servant
- Andrew Manson as Isidore's Servant
- David Neal as First Senator
- John Justin as Second Senator
- Cornelius Garrett as Prisoner
- Elyane Sharling as Phryina
- Diana Dors as Timandra
- David Kincaid as First Bandit
- Derek Deadman as Second Bandit
- Gil Morris as Soldier

===== Behind the scenes =====
Michael Bogdanov was originally hired to direct this episode, but he resigned after his Oriental modern-dress interpretation was considered too radical, and Jonathan Miller reluctantly took over directorial duties. In the episode, Timon's seaside camp is littered with debris; half-buried statues and roofs of old houses from times past. This design concept stemmed from an idea Miller had originally had for Troilus and Cressida, which he was prepping when he took over Timon. The concept was that the Greek camp had been built on the ruins of old Troy, but now the remnants of the once buried city were beginning to surface from under the earth. For the scene when Timon loses his temper after the second banquet, actor Jonathan Pryce did not know how he wanted to play the scene, so Miller simply told him to improvise. This necessitated cameraman Jim Atkinson having to keep Pryce in shot without knowing beforehand where Pryce was going to go or what he was going to do. Only once, when Pryce seems as if he is about to bend over but then suddenly stops, did Atkinson lose Pryce from centre frame.

The Prefaces to Shakespeare episode for Timon of Athens was presented by Richard Pasco who had played Timon in a 1980 RSC production directed by Ron Daniels. The Shakespeare in Perspective episode was presented by journalist and satirist Malcolm Muggeridge.

===== Reception =====
Corinna Adam in the Listener enjoyed the satirical characters of the court lords and found Pryce succeeded in the transition from a man "melting with delight at his own generosity" to "the bitterest man on earth". Cecil Smith, in the Los Angeles Times, agreed that Pryce played Timon skillfully in an "impeccable production", and Miller had "turned in an absorbing work of television". John J. O'Connor, in the New York Times, agreed that Pryce was "remarkably in control" and praised Rodway, Shrapnel, and Welsh among a "uniformly splendid" cast. David Richards in the Washington Post also found Pryce's performance "bold". Like several reviewers, he noted that Diana Dors, playing Timandra, had been the UK's answer to Marilyn Monroe in the 1950s.

Nancy Banks-Smith, in the Guardian, lauded the experience like "finding a brand new Shakespeare play in the attic". While noting that Shakespeare's original text was not that moving, Banks-Smith found this the best Shakespearean production on television since Trevor Nunn's Macbeth, with Bird particularly funny and Rodway finding "active, glittering malice". In the London Times, Anthony Masters considered Timon a high point of the series and perfectly suited to television. He enjoyed Stephen Oliver's "exquisite cod-Monteverdi music, and the performances by Thomas and Cossins. Playing Timon as someone who gets his self-worth from his largesse was a solid acting decision that made more sense of the violence of his reaction when things change. In the latter scenes, the production came "briefly within touching distance of Lear". G. M. Pearce, in Cahiers Élisabéthains, found Pryce well-suited to the role, although sometimes the clarity of his diction was lost to his "volcanic intensity". Rodway's performance, in control of his emotions, was an effective contrast. Pearce liked Dors's comic talent but did not think Fortune and Bird succeeded as comic relief. Miller failing to do much to clarify the messy last act just emphasised the weakness of the original play.

Stanley Wells praised Abbott's flexible set but thought the decision to have Timon largely buried in the final scenes was "willful and constricting", even if it was intended to deliberately symbolise the character's withdrawal from the world. Pryce, while strong, "does not find the strange music which suggests in Timon an awareness of a world elsewhere" and it was unclear why the characters would then lament him as "noble Timon". Pryce included too many gasps and sniffs that interrupted his eloquent language. Writing elsewhere, Wells concluded that where Miller succeeded was that his production "filled in the crevices of the text, by realising rather than interpreting a challenging play. Miriam Gilbert, in Shakespeare on Film Newsletter, found moments of satisfaction and felt Pryce's first half performance was the highlighted, balancing the inner strain of his character with outward optimism. But she found Miller's persistent long shots to create too much distance from an already unemotional text, and that the play "Seems to come unglued" when Timon leaves Athens. There was a lack of variety in the interpretation and nothing to solve the play's structural problems or make sense of the progression of visitors and soliloquies during the long fourth act.

Rick Groen, in the Globe and Mail, concluded that "ol' Will wrote a clinker", and although Miller cut some extraneous material, the audience's attention flagged throughout. However he felt that Pryce dealt well with the excessive speeches of Timon and Welsh brought "a touching air of resigned melancholy" to the character of Flavius, while the camera work during the cave scenes at least helped to keep the audience focused in spite of the material.

==== Antony and Cleopatra ====
- Directed by Jonathan Miller
- Produced by Jonathan Miller
- Designed by Colin Lowrey
- Taping dates: 5–10 March 1980
- First transmitted in the UK: 8 May 1981
- First transmitted in the US: 20 April 1981
- Running time (PAL DVD): 170 minutes

Cast

- John Paul as Canidius
- Jonathan Adams as Ventidius
- Jane Lapotaire as Cleopatra
- Colin Blakely as Antony
- Darien Angadi as Alexas
- Janet Key as Charmian
- Howard Goorney as Soothsayer
- Cassie McFarlane as Iras
- Emrys James as Enobarbus
- Kevin Huckstep as Messenger
- Michael Anthony as Messenger
- Mohammad Shamsi as Mardian
- Ian Charleson as Octavius Caesar
- Esmond Knight as Lepidus
- Harry Waters as Thyreus
- David Neal as Proculeius
- Anthony Pedley as Agrippa
- Geoffrey Collins as Dolabella
- Donald Sumpter as Pompeius
- George Innes as Menas
- Desmond Stokes as Menecrates
- Lynn Farleigh as Octavia
- David Kincaid as Cleopatra's Messenger
- Simon Chandler as Eros
- Pat Connell as Soldier
- Christopher Ettridge as Scarus
- George Howe as Euphronius
- John Eastham as Servant
- Iain Rattray as Soldier
- Frederick Warder as Soldier
- Michael Egan as Soldier
- Alec Sabin as Dercetas
- Jimmy Gardner as Clown

===== Behind the scenes =====
Although this episode was the last this season episode to air, it was the first episode shot under Jonathan Miller's producership. He purposely interpreted it in a manner divergent from most theatrical productions. Miller felt strongly that the play could only be understood not as true history but through the prism of Shakespeare's contemporaries, making this "a sixteenth-century version of Roman antiquity". (136). As a result he wanted to avoid literal scenery which, he argued, wouldn't be convincing as Ancient Egypt anyway. (136-137) He noted that we no longer live in the "romantic heroism" of previous centuries, who could view this figures unproblematically (142-143). Whereas the love between Antony and Cleopatra is usually seen in a heightened manner, as a grand passion, Miller saw it as a love between two people well past their prime who are both on a "downhill slide, each scrambling to maintain a foothold". He compared Antony to a football player who had waited several seasons too long to retire, and Cleopatra to a "treacherous slut". Miller used Paolo Veronese's The Family of Darius before Alexander as a major influence in his visual design of this episode, as it mixes both classical and Renaissance costumes in a single image.

This is one of only two episodes in which original Shakespearean text was substituted with additional material (the other is Love's Labour's Lost). Miller and his script editor David Snodin cut Act 3, Scene 10 and replaced it with the description of the Battle of Actium from Plutarch's Parallel Lives, which is delivered as an onscreen legend overlaying a painting of the battle.

During rehearsal of the scene with the snake, Jane Lapotaire, who suffers from ophidiophobia, was extremely nervous, but was assured the snake was well-trained. At that point, the snake crawled down the front of her dress towards her breast, before then moving around her back. During the shooting of the scene, Lapotaire kept her hands on the snake at all times.

The Prefaces to Shakespeare episode for Antony & Cleopatra was presented by Barbara Jefford who had played Cleopatra in a 1965 Oxford Playhouse production directed by Frank Hauser. The Shakespeare in Perspective episode was presented by "agony aunt" Anna Raeburn.

===== Reception =====
In the Times of London, Michael Ratcliffe called the production a "triumph" through Miller"s "overall use of intelligence and scale". He appreciated Blakely restoring the "warm-blooded, witty and gentle" nature to Antony, while Lapotaire "radiates nervous high spirits and mischief". But his strongest acclaim was for the verse speaking, which walked the perfect middle ground between the music of the rhythm and modern understanding. In the Washington Post, Henry Mitchell concurred that the production was "gorgeous ... handsomely, even superbly mounted". G. M. Pearce in Cahiers Élisabéthains declared the production be a "satisfying experience", with rich costumes and a clever use of close-ups to concentrate on the actors. Lapotaire conveyed Cleopatra's "magnetic attraction" and Blakely gave her a "virile and hot-tempered Antony to love". Rick Groen, in the Globe and Mail, was equally laudatory, praising the revisionist production for being "acutely psychological", with Miller's choices supported by the text. The short scenes of the play also made sense on television. The play stripped away "rusted-on layers of staid dramaturgy" to reveal the complex text and a central pair who remain gorgeous "but only in each other's calcified eyes".

The New York Times was uncertain, although enjoyed the "generally strong cast", in particular Blakely, Charleson, and James. Lapotaire sometimes got "overheated" but, by the final scene, 'this fine actress is in total control of Cleopatra as woman and symbol". The criticism was mostly aimed at Miller's approach, whereby "too much of the romance and glamour is eliminated", to the point where the production felt like a theatrical performance being put on by suburban ladies. Jack Kroll, in Newsweek, enjoyed Miller's artistic framing and design but found that he "undercut the tragic dimension" to the point where the lead characters seemed closer to Wilbur Mills and Fanne Foxe than grand tragedy. Clive James, in the Observer, was horrified that only Lynn Farleigh spoke the iambic pentameter as he believed it was intended. "You could marvel at the miracles of lighting while the actors got on with murdering the verse".

Kenneth Rothwell found that the production "achieves respectability but not brilliance", with the Elizabethan setting sacrificing "theatrical values on the altar of pedantry". He found the blocking of Antony's death scene inept, but found Charleson memorable and Lapotaire "so strong it should be retitled Cleopatra and Antony". The sets sometimes went too far in the direction of paintings, so that the ship sequences contained too many drapes and hangings: "one is left with a sense of Antony and Cleopatra who dwell in a universe of Gypsy Tea Rooms." In the Spectator, Richard Ingrams found Miler's "bad casting" in both lead roles. Cleopatra was "wretchedly misconceived ... a neurotic, petulant woman", while Blakely's Antony was "more of a grizzled Ulster soccer manager fighting to save off relegation". In the Guardian, Peter Fiddick enjoyed the lead actors going against tradition, including Charleson as a "fresh-faced, less than impervious" Octavius. But found an "uneasy contrast" with actors like Farleigh who played and spoke their roles traditionally. Ultimately, Miller's concept didn't live up to its ideas, with unsuccessful moments such as the women trying to life Antony into the monument, making this a rare disappointment from the director. William Boyd, in the New Statesman, was impressed by Lapotaire's "mercurial, tense" Cleopatra, and Miller's direction with its "remarkable, painterly compositional sense". But he felt that Shakespeare's "schizophrenic" Antony defeated both Miller and Blakely. By contrast, Cecil Smith, in the Los Angeles Times, found Blakely "marvelous" in a production with "vigor, brawn, wit, and clarity" but Lapotaire turned Cleopatra into little more than a "bright and witty suburban housewife", making Antony's massive sacrifice unbelievable.

In Shakespeare on Film Newsletter, Charles B. Lower was generally positive, remarking on the "lively pacing" and the ability of the lead pair to sustain viewer attention, and noting James as a stand-out in the cast. But cuts to the text were damaging, such as cutting the early reference to Pompey which limits the impact of his first appearance, and reducing the scope of the play by removing the short Act 4 scene 3 where soldiers perceive the god Hercules abandoning Antony. While understanding that Miller combined several minor characters to make it easy for the viewer to comprehend, it often neutered the effect of these characters. Rather than being an "emblematic" figure who appears in one scene, characters like Eros had to serve multiple purposes, which reduces Shakespeare's intended function of their main scene.

H. R. Coursen loathed the production, calling it "a disaster as unmitigated and as monumental as possible". The setting erased any difference between Egypt and Rome, crucial to the play, while the casting was "egregious" with a "short, pathetic Antony who, never having been on the hill, could not be over it" and a "sexless Cleopatra". He found the production took the text closer to Edward Albee than Shakespeare, and failing to find any real love or passion. The biggest problem was that nothing seems to happen. "Miller forgets that he is working with drama. Not painting". Taking act 2 scene 2 as an example, Coursen argues that, while the scene looks breathtakingly beautiful, most audience members wouldn't know afterward what had happened. This was a particular problem for the character of Cleopatra, who is supposed to be creating the sense of grandeur about herself as much as the playwright. Richard David believed Blakely succeeded "in suggesting both the basic opportunism of the man and the geniality and generosity" that earn him followers, while Charleson gave Caesar "a more subtle portrait" than usual. But Lapotaire did not convey the regal nature of her character and "lacked something of the mystery, the never-ending unpredictability" of the character. For Nicholas Shrimpton, in the Times Literary Supplement, Charleson was splendid and James in particular powerful by adapting his performance to the intimate medium. But there was too much "visual and verbal serenity", making the production a "kind of theatrical bas-relief". "The predominant effect is of complicated events in a crowded corridor", Shrimpton wrote, removing the grandeur and becoming "a smaller thing than Shakespeare".

=== Season 4 ===
==== Othello ====
- Directed by Jonathan Miller
- Produced by Jonathan Miller
- Designed by Colin Lowrey
- Taping dates: 9–17 March 1981
- First transmitted in the UK: 4 October 1981
- First transmitted in the US: 12 October 1981
- Running time (PAL DVD): 203 minutes

Cast

- Anthony Pedley as Roderigo
- Bob Hoskins as Iago
- Geoffrey Chater as Brabantio
- Alexander Davion as Gratiano
- Anthony Hopkins as Othello
- David Yelland as Cassio
- Joseph O'Conor as Lodovico
- Peter Walmsley as Officer
- John Barron as Duke of Venice
- Seymour Green as First Senator
- Howard Goorney as Second Senator
- Penelope Wilton as Desdemona
- Rosemary Leach as Emilia
- Tony Steedman as Montano
- Max Harvey as First Gentleman
- Terence McGinity as Second Gentleman
- Nigel Nobes as Third Gentleman
- Wendy Morgan as Bianca
- Arabella Weir as Lady in Waiting

===== Behind the scenes =====
Cedric Messina had planned to screen Othello during the second season, and had attempted to cast James Earl Jones as Othello. However, the British Actors' Equity Association had written into their contract with the BBC that only British actors could appear in the series, and if Messina cast Jones, Equity threatened to strike, thus crippling the show. Messina backed down and Othello was pushed back to a later season. By the time it was produced, Jonathan Miller had taken over as producer, and he decided that the play was not about race at all, casting a white actor in the role. Miller believed that "the play is thrown out of balance by making race the central issue" when the universal human emotion of jealousy underpins the plot and often has unclear motivations in people. Although white Othellos were still seen on the British stage until 1980, this became the last major production in the country to have a white actor playing the role in makeup. Jones would later see the production, concluding that Hopkins "seemed lost".

During production, Miller based the visual design on the work of El Greco. He opted for an unadorned, monochrome costume design as the colours of the script are in the emotion of the characters. The monochrome was offset by touches of red and umber. The Venetian council chamber was based on a Joos van Wassenhove painting of the Duke of Urbino listening to a lecture. Scenic artist Alan Matthews painted the Tintoretto paintings. The interior design was also based on the interiors of the Palazzo Ducale, Urbino, while the street set was based on a real street in Cyprus. Miller and Hoskins conceived of Iago as a classic trickster figure from ancient mythology. Hoskins said that his main acting note "was to do him as Rumplestiltskin".

For the scene where Iago asks Cassio about Bianca, Othello stands behind the open door. Most of the scene is shot from behind him, so the audience sees what he sees. However, not all the dialogue between Iago and Cassio is audible, which led to criticism when the episode was screened in the US, where it was assumed that the sound people simply had not done their job. It was, in fact, an intentional choice; if Othello is having difficulty hearing what they are saying, so too is the audience. Miller chose to omit the material with the clown and the musicians to ensure a dramatic throughline.

The Prefaces to Shakespeare episode for Othello was presented by Bob Peck who had played Iago in a 1979 RSC production directed by Ronald Eyre. The Shakespeare in Perspective episode was presented by author Susan Hill.

===== Reception =====
Sean French, in the London Times, declared it was "magnificently conceived for television", remarking on how the dialogue was able to be played in a style that would be impossible on stage but felt "appropriate for [this] cloistered drama". John Naughton, in the Listener, found the production "quite, quite ravishing to watch", commenting on the aesthetics of Miller's production that , "every time Miller's cast moved, they moved into another still life". In the New York Times, John J. O'Connor found that Hoskins playing Iago as a gangster "works to a surprising degree" although over a long night it made Iago seem too obvious, making the other characters seem oblivious Wilton transformed Desdemona "into a figure of unusual strength", while Leach stole the final scene with her pathos. While Hopkins sometimes went incomprehensible in his most emotional moments, he largely spoke the verse in such a way as to produce a "remarkable clarity of meaning".

Russell Davies found a production that didn't work, with only Rosemary Leach's Emilia redeeming things in the final scene. Hoskins was "nasty, brutal and short ... making Iago a giggling psychopath reduces the tragedy to vicitimisation". Nancy Banks-Smith also praised Leach as well as Miller's artistic compositions, but she founds Hopkins's performance – as well as his pants with their codpiece – to be ill-advised and distracting. G. M. Pearce, in Cahiers Élisabéthains, agreed that Hopkins was not everyone's idea of how Othello should be portrayed but admired Hoskins as a "mastiff-like" Iago, "by turns disturbing and magnetic throughout". Pearce concluded that Othello was not one of Miller's more successful productions, although often beautiful and with some striking performances. R. Thomas Simone, in Shakespeare on Film Newsletter, also noted Hopkins's unfortunate striped pants and the domestication of the production, which was dominated by Iago. Simone found it unusual that even in the final tableau, Desdemona's body and Othello's final moments are treated as less visually important than Iago. Although Simone felt Hoskins, Wilton, and Leach all succeeded, the domestic approach by Miller and Hopkins neutered the power of the title figure: "the largeness of the character of Othello is thrown away".

In the Washington Post, David Richards felt it was ridiculous to retain the references to Hopkins as black, when Richards felt Hopkins was playing the role as a white man, and bringing only "peevish and snarling" approaches to a great character. The low-volume of speech turned the production into mumbling, and Miller's camera lingered too much, mistaking slow pacing for intimacy. Howard Hoskins was successful in playing the class distinction of Iago from the rest of the cast. Choice declared that the production lacked "verbal music, passion, and epic tragic scale" and would alienate students from Shakespeare. "Iago and Desdemond have been more interestingly and movingly played in dozens of regional theatre productions in the US". Richard Ingrams, in the Spectator, declared Hopkins "hopelessly miscast", suiting the intellectual Pierre in the 1972 War and Peace but not the martial Othello; his opening speech to the council was "delivered in the dull monotone of a policeman giving evidence in a magistrate's court". Wilton was too old, coming across like Joyce Grenfell. Ingrams concluded that Miller understood every line of the play but had "no insight whatsoever into the actors who speak them".

Clive James was indecisive. He found the production interesting and visually "absolutely ravishing", and enjoyed the subtle notes (except for Othello's codpiece). Wilton and Hopkins spoke the verse well but not Hoskins, who additionally made Iago too overtly untrustworthy, asking "would you buy a used handkerchief from this man?" Ultimately, Miller's approach left the play deprived of most of its forward drive.

==== Troilus and Cressida ====
- Directed by Jonathan Miller
- Produced by Jonathan Miller
- Designed by Colin Lowrey
- Taping dates: 28 July-5 August 1981
- First transmitted in the UK: 7 November 1981
- First transmitted in the US: 17 May 1982
- Running time (PAL DVD): 190 minutes

Cast

- Charles Gray as Pandarus
- Anton Lesser as Troilus
- Tony Steedman as Aeneas
- Suzanne Burden as Cressida
- Max Harvey as Alexander
- Peter Walmsley as Servant to Troilus
- Vernon Dobtcheff as Agamemnon
- Geoffrey Chater as Nestor
- Benjamin Whitrow as Ulysses
- Bernard Brown as Menelaus
- Anthony Pedley as Ajax
- The Incredible Orlando as Thersites
- Kenneth Haigh as Achilles
- Simon Cutter as Patroclus
- Esmond Knight as Priam
- John Shrapnel as Hector
- Elayne Sharling as Cassandra
- David Firth as Paris
- Paul Moriarty as Diomedes
- David Kinsey as Servant to Paris
- Ann Pennington as Helen
- Peter Whitbread as Calchas
- Merelina Kendall as Andromache
- Cornelius Garrett as Margarelon
- Tony Portacio as Helenus
- Peter J. Cassell as Deiphobus

===== Behind the scenes =====
Director Jonathan Miller used the work of gothic painter Lucas Cranach as primary visual influence during this production. Several of Cranach's sketches can be seen in Ajax's tent, most notably, Eve from his Adam and Eve woodcut, hung on the tent like a nude centrefold. Miller wanted Troy to be sharply differentiated from Greece; Troy was decadent, with clear abstract lines (based on some of Hans Vredeman de Vries' architectural experiments with perspective). Costumes were elegant and bright, based on the works of Cranach and Albrecht Dürer because they seemed "poised on the edge of a new world" between the age of Chaucer and the Renaissance. The Greek camp, on the other hand, was based on a gypsy camp near the BBC Television Centre; cluttered, dirty and squalid. Miller envisioned it as built on the remains of an earlier Troy, with bits of roofs jutting out of the ground and bits and pieces of ancient statues lying around (although this idea originated for Troilus, Miller had first used it in his earlier Timon of Athens). Also, on one side of the camp, a huge wooden horse leg can be seen under construction – the Trojan Horse. In the command tent, a schematic for the horse is visible in several scenes, as is a scale model on the desk nearby. Miller wanted the camp to give the sense of "everything going downhill," with the men demoralised, fed up fighting, wanting only to get drunk and sleep (except Ulysses, who is depicted as still fully alert) The uniforms were all khaki coloured, and although Renaissance in style, were based on the TV show M*A*S*H, with Thersites specifically based on Corporal Klinger.

Of the play, Miller stated "it's ironic, it's farcical, it's satirical: I think it's an entertaining, rather frothily ironic play. It's got a bitter-sweet quality, rather like black chocolate. It has a wonderfully light ironic touch and I think it should be played ironically, not with heavy-handed agonising on the dreadful futility of it all." Miller chose to set the play in a Renaissance milieu rather than a classical one, as he felt it was really about Elizabethan England rather than ancient Troy, and as such, he hoped the production would carry relevance for a contemporary TV audience; "I feel that Shakespeare's plays and all the works of the classic rank, of literary antiquity, must necessarily be Janus-faced. And one merely pretends that one is producing pure Renaissance drama; I think one has to see it in one's own terms. Because it is constantly making references, one might as well be a little more specific about it. Now that doesn't mean that I want to hijack them for the purposes of making the plays address themselves specifically to modern problems. I think what one wants to do is to have these little anachronistic overtones so that we're constantly aware of the fact that the play is, as it were, suspended in the twentieth-century imagination, halfway between the period in which it was written and the period in which we are witnessing it. And then there is of course a third period being referred to, which is the period of the Greek antiquity."

During rehearsals, Miller saw Cressida not as an ethically corrupt person but as an innocent who finds herself enjoying the game rather than processing it seriously. Burden somewhat disagreed, seeing Cressida as a witty and intelligent young woman but one who is still discovering herself, and whose survival instincts kick in when she is taken to the Greek camp. The lover's meeting scene, at eleven minutes, was the longest single-camera take in the production. Act 5 scene 9 was rehearsed but had to be cut when time ran out during the studio session; the same happened to an intended moment of Achilles entering carrying Patroclus's body in Act 5 scene 5.

The Prefaces to Shakespeare episode for Troilus & Cressida was presented by Norman Rodway who had played Thersites in a 1968 RSC production directed by John Barton. The Shakespeare in Perspective episode was presented by diplomat Sir David Hunt.

===== Reception =====
In the Globe and Maill, Rick Groen found the play very relevant, and revelatory for most audience members who wouldn't be familiar with it. Miller "makes the overblown language accessible" and his camera effectively tells the story from the first slow dolly shot during the prologue. Groen found Gray and Birkett particularly memorable, leading the audience "deep into a bleak demi-monde", while the themes of futile war resonated with then-recent conflicts such as the Falklands War. Barbara Hogdon, in Shakespeare on Film Newsletter, noted Miller approached the play very differently to Terry Hands' then-recent (1981) production for the Royal Shakespeare Company. Whereas Hands exaggerated his characters almost to caricature to play up the politics, Miller seemed to step back, allowing the characters' own points-of-view to come forth, keeping "all options open, treating the characters with care and respect". However Hodgdon also noted she was beginning to tire of Miller's trademark shot of "three talking heads, two in three-quarter profile, one slightly backgrounded".

In the New York Times, John J. O'Connor declared Lesser and Burden "properly lyrical and passionate" among a strong cast, with Gray standing out for bringing a "pronounced homosexual patina" to his role. However O'Connor felt that Miller's treatment of the play would have led to confusion for the audience, largely new to the play, about which character is which, and on which side of the war they fight. While the approach was deliberate, "anybody not familiar with the play is only likely to be puzzled". Michael Ratcliffe, writing for the London Times, thought the love scenes were first-rate, especially the lovers' farewell, but concluded that the production failed in terms of "casting, clarity of argument, and a single, dazzling visual key". G. M. Pearce in Cahiers Élisabéthains thought the production was too confusing throughout, stronger in the scenes of war than scenes of love, and that Gray was too overwhelming when compared to Lesser's low-key approach as Troilus.

Stanley Wells thought the production, although beautifully lit, was too "dispassionate", existing simply to create a sense of reality rather than have any interpretation. He also compared it to the 1981 Terry Hands production which used a World War I analogy, whereas this production didn't get at "the desolating futility of war, the pathetic grandeur of the human challenge to oblivion", which Hands's production, and before that, Peter Hall's 1960 production, had achieved. Wells also felt that "it is misplaced pedantry" for Miller's cast to pronounce "Trojan" as "Troyan". Wells noted that the sequence where Troilus spies on Cressida in the Greek camp was a good example of the challenges of adapting Shakespeare to television; the three different groups are supposed to be reacting and speaking almost simultaneously, which becomes very difficult on screen. In the Guardian, Nancy Banks-Smith admired the acting from Gray, Sharpnel and Whitrow, but only Birkett really kept the audience awake. She felt that the play's relevance cried out for modern dress, and it was a shame that the overall series is "committed to a kind of Elizabethan vacuum". Banks-Smith concluded that the production felt like "some intolerable ten-year cocktail party", filled with "thick, clotted, interminable talk".

==== A Midsummer Night's Dream ====
- Directed by Elijah Moshinsky
- Produced by Jonathan Miller
- Designed by David Myerscough-Jones
- Taping dates: 19–25 May 1981
- First transmitted in the UK: 13 December 1981
- First transmitted in the US: 19 April 1982
- Running time (PAL DVD): 111 minutes

Cast

- Estelle Kohler as Hippolyta
- Nigel Davenport as Theseus
- Hugh Quarshie as Philostrate
- Geoffrey Lumsden as Egeus
- Pippa Guard as Hermia
- Nicky Henson as Demetrius
- Robert Lindsay as Lysander
- Cherith Mellor as Helena
- Geoffrey Palmer as Quince
- Brian Glover as Bottom
- John Fowler as Flute
- Don Estelle as Starveling
- Nat Jackley as Snout
- Ray Mort as Snug
- Phil Daniels as Puck
- Helen Mirren as Titania
- Peter McEnery as Oberon
- Tania Bennett as Fairy
- Alexandra Segal as Fairy
- Louise Mason as Fairy
- Lee MacDonald as Fairy
- Bruce Savage as Peaseblossom
- Massimo Mezzofanti as Cobweb
- Dominic Martelli as Moth
- Timothy Cross as Mustardseed

===== Behind the scenes =====
Jonathan Miller planned on directing this episode himself, with fairies inspired by the work of Inigo Jones and Hieronymus Bosch, but he directed Timon of Athens instead, after original director Michael Bogdanov quit that production. Elijah oshinsky called his production in part "an homage to Max Reinhardt, who directed the play several times in the first half of the twentieth century in a style that paid tribute to the 19th century romantic conception, and subsequently adapted the play into a 1935 film. As such, Moshinsky based his fairies on the baroque eroticism of Rembrandt and Peter Paul Rubens; in particular Rembrandt's Danaë was used as the inspiration for Titania's bed. Fashioning a darker production than is usual for this play, Moshinsky referred to the style of the adaptation as "romantic realism." As a result, the backgrounds were abstract and impressionist, while the props and key set items, including the animals, were real in the foreground. Designer David Myerscough-Jones added to this with touches of seventeenth-century Cavalier-style. Miller disliked productions which portrayed Puck as a mischievous but harmless and lovable sprite, so he had Phil Daniels play him as if he were an anti-establishment punk, with A Clockwork Orange as a reference point for the character's anarchic nature. Unlike most productions on screen, Puck doesn't disappear or travel quickly using camera tricks, but is sweaty when he returns from errands, becoming more seemingly human. It has long been rumoured, but never confirmed, that in his portrayal of Peter Quince, actor Geoffrey Palmer was imitating the soon-to-retire Director General of the BBC, Ian Trethowan.

The Prefaces to Shakespeare episode for A Midsummer Night's Dream was presented by Frances de la Tour who had played Helena in a 1970 RSC production directed by Peter Brook. The Shakespeare in Perspective episode was presented by art historian Roy Strong.

===== Reception =====
In the Guardian, Nancy Banks-Smith considered this the most successful of the BBC productions thus far, enjoying the consistent water imagery although feeling that Moshinsky cut too much of the text. But the lovers "were the great success of this production", more delightful than any she had seen on stage. G. M. Pearce, in Cahiers Élisabéthains, also considered the water imagery to be a success, singling out Guard, and Mirren's strongly sensual Titania, as highlights.

John J. O'Connor, in the New York Times, declared that with a "typically strong and impressive cast", "Moshinsky's conception weaves its spell from beginning to end". O'Connor felt that Moshinsky successfully brought his characters into gatherings in front of the camera, so the audience felt like it was eavesdropping, rather than having characters spaced around like in a stage production. He especially liked Daniels bringing "a curious element of sexuality" to Puck's dealings with the humans, and felt this was as iconic a performance for the 1980s as Peter Brook's famous Royal Shakespeare Company production was for the 1970s. Whereas O'Connor liked the tight framing, Scott Colley, in Shakespeare on Film Newsletter, was critical of forcing the characters into tight configurations. Attempting to make the frames look like paintings "chokes the actors", Colley argued, although Mohsinsky's use of colour and light was nonetheless impressive. Mellor stood out as a performer, as well as Mirren, who stood out in her white gown as sometimes "the source of all the light".

In the Times Literary Supplement, Nicholas Shrimpton declared the production "the nearest this series has come to disaster" since Jonathan Miller took over as producer. Shrimpton found many scenes failed, from the "modish" quarrel scene in which the lovers spoke simultaneously to the performance of Pyramus and Thisbe that seemed onscreen like "a strange sequence of individual party pieces" that couldn't combine to be funny. Shrimpton was confused by the 'rude mechanicals' having such differing accents, which suggested classes mingling, and there was no explanation as to why Hippolyta went from being a resentful captive in the first act to a satisfied bride in the last act. Stephen Oliver's score, too, was criicised as "sub-Mendelssohn at one moment, sub-Gibbons at the next". Shrimpton concluded that Moshinsky was reacting against Miller's "house style" which set the plays in a Jacobean sensibility, by ignoring all approaches to A Midsummer Night's Dream since World War II, closer to the romantic accounts of Herbert Beerbohm Tree, with too similarities to Max Reinhardt's film, including a working-class Puck and an "earth-goddess Titania". David Richards, in the Washington Post, also found that Moshinsky had gone back to a pre-Brook romantic framework, but believed that this worked well. The production was "bewitching" throughout, with Mellor especially funny, the mechanicals scenes lit "in the golden tones of an Old Master", and Titania looking like she "stepped from a Pre-Raphaelite canvas".

=== Season 5 ===
==== King Lear ====
- Directed by Jonathan Miller
- Produced by Shaun Sutton
- Designed by Colin Lowrey
- Taping dates: 26 March-2 April 1982
- First transmitted in the UK: 19 September 1982
- First transmitted in the US: 18 October 1982
- Running time (PAL DVD): 185 minutes

Cast

- John Shrapnel as Earl of Kent
- Norman Rodway as Earl of Gloucester
- Michael Kitchen as Edmund
- Michael Hordern as King Lear
- Gillian Barge as Goneril
- Brenda Blethyn as Cordelia
- Penelope Wilton as Regan
- John Bird as Duke of Albany
- Julian Curry as Duke of Cornwall
- David Weston as Duke of Burgundy
- Harry Waters as King of France
- Anton Lesser as Edgar
- John Grillo as Oswald
- Iain Armstrong as First Gentleman
- Frank Middlemass as Fool
- Ken Stott as Curan
- Stuart Blake as First Servant
- Tony Sympson as Second Servant
- Peter Walmsley as Third Servant
- George Howe as Doctor
- John Dallimore as Second Gentleman
- Tim Brown as Captain
- Adam Kurakin as Herald
- Fraser Wilson as Third Gentleman
- Richard Albrecht as Officer

===== Behind the scenes =====
Originally, Cedric Messina cast Robert Shaw to play Lear, with an aim to do the show during the second season with a different director, but Shaw died suddenly in 1978 before production could begin, and the play was pushed back. Jonathan Miller, who took over as producer of the series from Messina, had previously directed a Nottingham Playhouse production of King Lear in 1969, starring Michael Hordern as Lear and Frank Middlemass as the Fool. In 1975, he remounted that production for the BBC Play of the Month, which happened to be the BBC's last Shakespeare production prior to the beginning of the Television Shakespeare. During his time as producer, Miller tried to persuade the BBC to re-air the Play of the Month production in place of a new King Lear, but this was rejected, and a new production expected. At the end of the fourth season, when Miller concluded his time as producer, his contract stipulated that he still had one production to direct. Incoming producer Shaun Sutton offered him Love's Labour's Lost, but Miller wanted to do a tragedy. Of the three remaining tragedies, Miller had never directed Macbeth or Coriolanus, but felt comfortable with Lear.

The production was much the same as his 1969/1975 version, with Hordern and Middlemass reprising their roles alongside Penelope Wilton as Regan, and similar concepts for the design, costume, and lighting. However where that production had a truncated text, this used much more of Shakespeare's script. Miller used a "board and drapes" approach to the play; all interiors were shot on or near a plain wooden platform while all exteriors were shot against a cycloramic curtain with dark tarpaulins. As such, although exteriors and interiors were clearly distinguished from one another, both were nonrepresentational. Miller had considered using a built set but he was inspired by a book of Irving Penn photographs shared with him by his son, which featured people photographed in front of cloth drapes. The useful byproduct of having no set was that more funds could be spent on costumes. Lear's throne was reused from Miller's production of Troilus and Cressida, now painted black.

To enhance the starkness of the look of the production, Miller had lighting technician John Treays desaturate the colour by 30 per cent. Miller also used colour to connect characters; the Fool wears white makeup which washes off during the storm, Edgar wears a white mask when he challenges Edmund to fight, and Cordelia wears white makeup after her death. Similarly, the Fool has red feathers in his hat, Edgar has a red tunic, and Cordelia's red welts on her neck stand out starkly against the white of her skin after her death.

In Miller's earlier versions, the Fool was not in the opening scene (in line with the text). This time, his addition gave the character a stronger personal and protective connection to Cordelia. Hordern adjusted his performance to criticism he had previously received that his Lear was not "regal" enough. He noted that the only chance an actor has to show Lear in his role as King is in the first scene. Although some critics disagreed with Miller's choice to cast a fool in his 60s, Miller argued that the character's wisdom and his "reproving peevishness" didn't make sense in a young person.

The Prefaces to Shakespeare episode for King Lear was presented by Tony Church who had played the Fool in a 1962 RSC production directed by Peter Brook. The Shakespeare in Perspective episode was presented by literary critic Frank Kermode.

===== Reception =====
In the Observer, Martin Amis enjoyed the majority of the "quietly satisfying" production, with the first two acts played as "domestic farce". With Hordern making a Lear who was disagreeable, Goneril and Regan seemed almost sensible to the audience, which increased the impact of the later acts. This was a Lear addicted to being King, and Hordern's speeches in Act IV were superb. Miller's reading "Gives the play a magical and mythical aspect" while being less political. However, for Amis, Lesser was the weak point as Edgar, making his lines both meaningless and anti-poetic with his "looney-tunes gabbling". John J. O'Connor, in the New York Times, concluded that the production "works not spectacularly but quite rewardingly", with a convincing Hordern in the lead role. Shrapnel was sympathetic as Kent, Rodway moving as Gloucester, and Middlemass had "exceptional dignity" as the Fool. The subplot with Gloucester was given "just the right dramatic weight", with Lesser and Kitchen strong as the brothers. O'Connor concluded that Miller's direction was "sensible" rather than flashy, but always engaging. Cecil Smith, in the Los Angeles Times, declared the production "stark, clean, chilling", with a brilliant storm scene and direction that "caught the fairy tale aura to Lear".

Dennis Hackett, in the London Times, admired Hordern and Miller finally getting a chance with a fuller text, and that the play moved with strong pacing: "a memorable reconciliation of reflective experience with opportunity". All three sisters and Lesser were exceptional, as well as Rodway, while the decision to cast an older fool suggests the intimacy of the character with Lear, and adds a weary pathos to his wisdom. Alexander Leggatt found the production to use the medium intelligently, revealing brilliant insight into the characters, including catching small character responses not possible on stage. But Leggatt also found that sometimes Miller's images made more sense in rehearsal than on screen, from Edgar's mask in the fight scene to the old man who pats Gloucester's head after he has been blinded. Kent having such a "striking and exotic" disguise made him pull too much attention for what is supposed to be a secondary character. At times the production was too "intelligent", missing the chances to be funny, especially with the Fool, but was still broadly a success.

Richard Ingrams concluded that he was unmoved by Hordern, who "could not bring any majesty" to the role of Lear, which was outside the actor's range, and thus came across as a "dotty professor". For Megan Rosenfield, in the Washington Post, the production was "clearly conceived and well realised", with the drama developing clearly with the use of a longer text than often seen on stage, especially among the sisters and Kent. However Rosenfield found the imagery that paralleled the mad Edgar with Jesus too obvious and the decision to have Edgar feign his madness a mistake on the small screen, where it came across as "overkill". Hordern also put too much self-pity in his madness, so the sense wasn't clear that Lear redeems his social conscience in the final act. H. R. Woudhuysen, in the Times Literary Supplement, acknowledged that Miller's work deserves close study for its intentionality, but that the simple camera work sometimes led to badly composed frames, with "too much of the unexplained and unnecessary which distracts the viewer". Lear was not sufficiently regal, making a domestic tragedy that gives too much audience interest to the villainous characters; the fool was "tiresome and unwitty, miscast", and John Bird was out of his depth as the husband to Gillian Barge's Goneril. Overall, there was too much "stumbling and mumbling" from the supporting cast, but Hordern was "astonishingly good", giving an intelligent and moving lead performance.

For Rick Groen, in the Globe and Mail, the production was aesthetically rewarding with the monochromatic look, "touching but never sublime". Without sets, there was no sense of Lear's grandeur at the start and thus nowhere for the character to fall from: "when the emperor starts out with no clothes ... all that subsequent raging and blowing seems less pitiable than redundant". The first two acts were too melodramatic, "like a rejected script from Dallas", but it became more powerful from there. In Shakespeare on Film Newsletter, Steven Urkowitz wrote the production off as a "hasty and inconsistent effort", largely abandoning Shakespeare's "magnificent design". Urkowitz noted several occasions when Shakespeare's words didn't meet the actions on screen, for example characters saying they are crying when they are not or violence not occurring in the way it is described in a letter scene. The undifferentiated costumes of the characters ignored the important division of social class in the play, while Miller's reliance on an "unmoving frame" into which the actors move resembled football on television more than Shakespeare. Nancy Banks-Smith, in the Guardian, agreed that Miller's blocking for the camera was too tight, most notable when the figures were "jostling" together on the heath. Banks-Smith also concluded that making the fool an older man only made the character seem more foolish than wise.

==== The Merry Wives of Windsor ====
- Directed by David Jones
- Produced by Shaun Sutton
- Designed by Don Homfray
- Taping dates: 1–8 November 1982
- First transmitted in the UK: 28 December 1982
- First transmitted in the US: 31 January 1983
- Running time (PAL DVD): 167 minutes

Cast

- Alan Bennett as Justice Shallow
- Richard O'Callaghan as Slender
- Tenniel Evans as Sir Hugh Evans
- Bryan Marshall as George Page
- Richard Griffiths as Sir John Falstaff
- Gordon Gostelow as Bardolph
- Nigel Terry as Pistol
- Michael Robbins as Nym
- Miranda Foster as Anne Page
- Judy Davis as Mistress Ford
- Prunella Scales as Mistress Page
- Ron Cook as Peter Simple
- Michael Graham Cox as Host of the Garter Inn
- Lee Whitlock as Robin
- Elizabeth Spriggs as Mistress Quickly
- John Joyce as John Rugby
- Michael Bryant as Doctor Caius
- Simon Chandler as Fenton
- Ben Kingsley as Frank Ford
- Ralph Brown as John
- Peter Gordon as Robert
- Crispin Mair as William Page

===== Behind the scenes =====
Director David Jones wanted to shoot the episode in Stratford-upon-Avon but was restricted to a studio setting. Determined that the production be as realistic as possible, Jones had designer Dom Homfray base the set on real Tudor houses associated with Shakespeare; Falstaff's room is based on the home of Mary Arden (Shakespeare's mother) in Wilmcote, and the wives' houses are based on the house of Shakespeare's daughter Susanna, and her husband, John Hall. For the background of exterior shots, he used a miniature Tudor village built of plasticine.

Jones was determined that the two wives not be clones of one another, so he had them appear as if Page was a well-established member of the bourgeoisie and Ford a member of the nouveau riche.

The Prefaces to Shakespeare episode for The Merry Wives of Windsor was presented by Prunella Scales who portrayed Mistress Page in the BBC adaptation. The Shakespeare in Perspective episode was presented by novelist Jilly Cooper.

===== Reception =====
John Engstrom, in the Boston Globe, declared this a "very funny production, filled with imaginative comic performances and bright splashes of slapstick", calling Kingsley a "virtuoso" as Ford, proving an "Elizabethan Charlie Chaplin". Spriggs, David, and Bryant provided great performances for television, alongside Jones's use of much social nuance and "exquisite" costumes. While Griffiths and Scales had more passive characters, Engstrom didn't blame them as this was reflected in the text. Ultimately, this is "as engaging a Merry Wives as currently exists". D. A. N. Jones, in the Listener, praised Griffiths's performance as Falstaff, with his "dark, predatory eyes asking for trouble", and convincing us of the character's seductive capabilities. In the New York Times, Walter Goodman acknowledged that the opening scenes could be off-putting for new audiences, with a range of unfamiliar actors in a complex series of near-unintelligible jests. But once things took off, this was a very appealing farce, with Scales bringing "wit and twinkling charm", Spriggs "delicious", and the basket scene the high point. Griffiths as Falstaff lost some of the typical quality of the character of Falstaff, but created "a consistent character who rises as required to moments of high farce".

In the Los Angeles Times, Dan Sullivan was disappointed in Jones's direction. Scenes supposed to be fun "are interiorised and lingered over", losing the play's theatrical rhythm and sense of farce: "it's Shakespeare-for-the-record". Stanley Wells, in the Times Literary Supplement, enjoyed Jones's willingness to let the comedy emerge from the characters rather than slapstick. But ultimately not enough was done to establish the social context within which the characters operate, such as Slender's wealth or a sense of other townspeople. As a result, the production sometimes felt like "an underpopulated travelogue".

Numerous reviewers disagreed with Griffiths's approach to the lead character. G. M. Pearce in Cahiers Élisabéthains thought he "spent the entire time.. looking grim-faced and worried". For Pearce, Spriggs was the real star, giving a "wonderfully observed portrait" as Mistress Quickly. Pearce appreciated the authentic set design and the inclusion of often-cut scenes such as the Latin lesson sequence. Peter Fiddick, in the Guardian, also felt Griffiths seemed to be still feeling his way into the part, upstaged by the detailed characterisation all around him. Fiddick enjoyed the production overall, though, with Homfray's "remarkably spacious and varied set", crisp editing, and a strong sense of collaboration between Scales and Davis as the wives. Bennett was a natural Shadow, Bryant was "having a ball" as Doctor Caius, and Gostelow was "born surely to play Bardolph". Kingsley stood out in a role that isn't always the most noticeable, creating a strongly individual Ford. In Shakespeare on Film Newsletter, Jeanne Addison Roberts enjoyed Spriggs and thought there were some inspired moments, well edited, with the final scenes very well done. But the piece was not cohesive. The opening was the dullest part, and Jones should have found a way to make these scenes clearer. Too many "lines and whole scenes were thrown away in a futile approximation of verisimilitude". Regardless of Jones's intentions, it was peculiar to Americans for Mistress Page to have a lower-class accent, as they would read it based on other popular British TV series. Ultimately both Griffiths and Kingsley were miscast—the first was too subdued for the production, the other too farcical.

==== The First Part of Henry the Sixt ====
- Directed by Jane Howell
- Produced by Jonathan Miller
- Designed by Oliver Bayldon
- Taping dates: 13–19 October 1981
- First transmitted in the UK: 2 January 1983
- First transmitted in the US: 27 March and 3 April 1983
- Running time (PAL DVD): 188 minutes

Cast

- John Benfield as Basset/French Sergeant/French Soldier (uncredited)/Scout (uncredited)
- Peter Benson as King Henry VI
- Brenda Blethyn as Joan La Pucelle
- Antony Brown as Duke of Burgundy
- David Burke as Duke of Gloucester
- Michael Byrne as Duke of Alençon
- Paul Chapman as Earl of Suffolk/Sir William Glasdale (uncredited)
- Ron Cook as Third Messenger to the King/Countess's Porter
- Arthur Cox as Mayor of London/Sir John Fastolf/Papal Legate (uncredited)
- David Daker as Reignier, Duke of Anjou/Vernon
- Brian Deacon as Earl of Somerset
- Tenniel Evans as Duke of Bedford/Mortimer, Earl of March/French General
- Derek Farr as Earl of Salisbury/Sir William Lucy
- Julia Foster as Margaret, Daughter of Reignier
- Derek Fuke as Talbot's Captain/Servant to Gloucester/Blue Coat (uncredited)
- Alex Guard as Young John Talbot
- Bernard Hill as Master Gunner/Duke of York
- Paul Jesson as Second Messenger to the King
- Joanna McCallum as Countess d'Auvergne
- Oengus MacNamara as Countess's Messenger/Tawny Coat (uncredited)/York's Messenger (uncredited)
- Frank Middlemass as Bishop, later Cardinal, of Winchester
- Joseph O'Conor as Duke of Exeter/Shepherd
- Trevor Peacock as Lord Talbot
- Brian Protheroe as Bastard of Orléans/First Messenger to the King (uncredited)
- David Pugh as Mayor's Officer/Watchman of Rouen/English Soldier (uncredited)
- Ian Saynor as the Charles, Dauphin of France
- Mark Wing-Davey as Earl of Warwick
- Peter Wyatt as Woodville, Lieutenant of the Tower/Sir Thomas Gargrave (uncredited)/French Sentinel (uncredited)/Lawyer (uncredited)/Blue Coat (uncredited)/Governor of Paris (uncredited)
- John Alford as Master Gunner's Boy

===== Behind the scenes =====
Joan faces off against Talbot during the Siege of Orléans. Note the brightly coloured "adventure playground" set, which stands out against the obviously studio-bound parquet flooring.

Although airing after King Lear and The Merry Wives of Windsor, this was produced before, as part of Jonathan Miller's time leading the series. Inspired by the notion that the political intrigues behind the Wars of the Roses often seemed like playground squabbles, Howell and production designer Oliver Bayldon staged the four plays in a single set resembling a children's adventure playground. They found their idea for the set in a medieval-themed adventure playground in Fulham, with power plants on the horizon, which seemed to Bayldon like a symbol of encroaching modernity. Little attempt was made at realism within the design. For example, Bayldon did not disguise the parquet flooring ("it stops the set from literally representing [...] it reminds us we are in a modern television studio"), and in all four productions, the title of the play is displayed within the set itself (on banners in The First Part and The Second Part (where it is visible throughout the entire first scene), on a shroud in The Third Part, and written on a chalkboard by Richard himself in The Tragedy of Richard III). Costumes were designed with blocks of colour for each of the main characters, to keep them identifiable to the audience, with the colours darkening as the play goes on. Many critics felt these set design choices lent the production an air of Brechtian verfremdungseffekt.

An element of verfremdungseffekt in this production is seen when Gloucester and Winchester encounter one another at the Tower; both are on horseback, but the horses they ride are hobbyhorses, which actors David Burke and Frank Middlemass cause to pivot and prance as they speak. The ridiculousness of this situation works to "effectively undercut their characters' dignity and status." The "anti-illusionist" set was also used as a means of political commentary; as the four plays progressed, the set decayed and became more and more dilapidated as social order becomes more fractious. In the same vein, the costumes become more and more monotone as the four plays move on – The First Part of Henry the Sixt features brightly coloured costumes which clearly distinguish the various combatants from one another, but by The Tragedy of Richard III, everyone fights in similarly coloured dark costumes, with little to differentiate one army from another. With most of the cast members performing a variety of small and large roles over the four productions, in the manner of repertory theatre, Howell also cast a "second company" of young actors trained in stage combat. These actors would perform the battle sequences, and had to battle the fight arranger, Malcolm Ranson, as part of their audition.

The Prefaces to Shakespeare episode for The First Part of Henry the Sixt was presented by Brewster Mason who had played Warwick in the 1963 RSC production The Wars of the Roses directed by John Barton and Peter Hall. The Shakespeare in Perspective episode was presented by historian Michael Wood.

===== Reception =====
Howell's presentation of the complete tetralogy was one of the most lauded achievements of the entire BBC series, and prompted Stanley Wells to argue that the productions were "probably purer than any version given in the theatre since Shakespeare's time. Wells wrote of the set that it was intended to invite the viewer to "accept the play's artificiality of language and action." He regarded Frank Middlemass, as Beaufort, and Trevor Peacock's Talbot and later Jack Cade, as some of the highlight performances of the tetralogy. Michael Hattaway describes the design as "anti-illusionist." Susan Willis argues it allows the productions "to reach theatrically toward the modern world." Ronald Knowles writes, "a major aspect of the set was the subliminal suggestion of childlike anarchy, role-playing, rivalry, game and vandalism, as if all culture were precariously balanced on the shaky foundations of atavistic aggression and power-mad possession."

In the Guardian, Nancy Banks Smith gave a largely negative review, calling it "terrible tosh" and disliking the seemingly low-budget set design, although appreciated Peacock being effective at both comedy and tragedy. Peter Ackroyd, for the Los Angeles Times, was grateful for Howell's manic take on the plays, which "extracted enjoyment from a play which otherwise would have been sheer torture to watch". In The Listener, D.A.N. Jones found much to admire, with Howell successfully drawing out both "the kindergarten babyishness and the noble savagery of the work". In the New York Times, John J. O'Connor found that the tetralogy plays worked "magnificently" under Howell's rein, with Bayldon's set particularly praised alongside Blethyn, the "truly formidable" Foster, and Benson's Henry "a model of admirable yet infuriating pity". O'Connor believed that the success was in large part due to the nature of the repertory cast; because the cast and crew had spent seven months together rehearsing and taping the productions, they had formed a "stage troupe" that heightened the productions in a way most television Shakespeare couldn't achieve.

Graham Holderness saw Howell's non-naturalistic production as something of a reaction to the BBC's adaptation of the Henriad in seasons one and two, which had been directed by David Giles in a traditional and straightforward manner; "where Messina saw the history plays conventionally as orthodox Tudor historiography, and [David Giles] employed dramatic techniques which allow that ideology a free and unhampered passage to the spectator, Jane Howell takes a more complex view of the first tetralogy as, simultaneously, a serious attempt at historical interpretation, and as a drama with a peculiarly modern relevance and contemporary application. The plays, to this director, are not a dramatization of the Elizabethan World Picture but a sustained interrogation of residual and emergent ideologies in a changing society [...] This awareness of the multiplicity of potential meanings in the play required a decisive and scrupulous avoidance of television or theatrical naturalism: methods of production should operate to open the plays out, rather than close them into the immediately recognisable familiarity of conventional Shakespearean production."

==== The Second Part of Henry the Sixt ====
- Directed by Jane Howell
- Produced by Jonathan Miller
- Designed by Oliver Bayldon
- Taping dates: 17–23 December 1981
- First transmitted in the UK: 9 January 1983
- First transmitted in the US: 10 and 17 April 1983
- Running time (PAL DVD): 213 minutes

Cast

- John Benfield as First Murderer/Ship's Master/Beadle of St. Albans (uncredited)/King's Messenger (uncredited)/1st Neighbour (uncredited)
- Peter Benson as King Henry VI
- Antony Brown as Walter Whitmore/Alexander Iden/Governor of the Isle of Man (uncredited)
- David Burke as Duke of Gloucester/Dick the Butcher
- Michael Byrne as John Hume/Ship's Lieutenant
- Anne Carroll as Duchess of Gloucester
- Paul Chapman as Earl of Suffolk
- Ron Cook as Richard Plantaganet/Alderman of St. Albans (uncredited)
- Arthur Cox as Thomas Horner/Lord Clifford/Master's Mate (uncredited)
- David Daker as Duke of Buckingham
- Brian Deacon as Duke of Somerset/Smith the Weaver
- Tenniel Evans as Earl of Salisbury/Clerk of Chartham
- Derek Farr as Lord Say/Roger Bolingbroke (uncredited)/1st Gentleman (uncredited)
- Julia Foster as Queen Margaret
- Derek Fuke as Sander Simpcox/George Bevis/Gloucester's Captain (uncredited)/1st Petitioner (uncredited)/2nd Neighbour (uncredited)
- Alex Guard as 2nd Prentice/Michael/Cade's Messenger (uncredited)
- Bernard Hill as Duke of York
- Paul Jesson as John Holland/George Plantagenet/John Southwell (uncredited)
- Pat Keen as Margery Jourdain
- Gabrielle Lloyd as Simpox's Wife
- Oengus MacNamara as Young Clifford/Irish Post (uncredited)/Gloucester's Messenger (uncredited)/1st Prentice (uncredited)
- Frank Middlemass as Cardinal Beaufort, Bishop of Winchester
- Trevor Peacock as Sheriff/Jack Cade
- Brian Protheroe as Edward Plantagenet
- David Pugh as Peter Thump/Second Murderer/William Stafford (uncredited)/2nd Gentleman (uncredited)
- Mark Wing-Davey as Earl of Warwick
- Peter Wyatt as Sir Humphrey Stafford/Mayor of St. Albans (uncredited)/Vaux (uncredited)/2nd Petitioner (uncredited)/3rd Neighbour (uncredited)

===== Behind the scenes =====
Henry (Peter Benson) surveys the destruction in the wake of the Jack Cade rebellion. Note the charred and rubbish-strewn set, which has darkened since 1 Henry VI, where yellow, bright blue and red predominated.

Jonathan Miller's last play as producer, this production was filmed on the same set as The First Part of Henry the Sixt. However, designer Oliver Bayldon altered the set so it would appear that the paintwork was flaking and peeling, and the set falling into a state of disrepair, as England descended into an ever-increasing state of chaos. Bayldon felt that the design should still invoke a "play park" but now one that had been boarded up and whitewashed, and become sinister in the process. In the same vein, the costumes became more and more monotone as the four plays went on; The First Part of Henry the Sixt features brightly coloured costumes which clearly distinguish the various combatants from one another, but by The Tragedy of Richard III, everyone fights in similarly coloured dark costumes, with little to differentiate one army from another. Costume designer John Peacock said that "at first the designs were costumes, but now they are becoming clothes". The cyclorama at the back of the set was lit with a blue light to obscure the gold threads in the cloth which had glimmered in the first part.

A strong element of verfremdungseffekt in this production is the use of doubling, particularly in relation to actors David Burke and Trevor Peacock. Burke plays Henry's most loyal servant, Gloucester, but after Gloucester's death, he plays Jack Cade's right-hand man, Dick the Butcher. Peacock plays Cade himself, having previously appeared in The First Part of Henry the Sixt as Lord Talbot, representative of the English chivalry so loved by Henry. Both actors play complete inversions of their previous characters, re-creating both an authentically Elizabethan theatrical practice and providing a Brechtian political commentary. The tetralogy was taped not long after the 1981 England riots and during the early stages of the Falklands War, and Howell related these political issues to the cast as part of the topical nature of the play. She made care not to romanticise the plays' commoners either, who were often the "thickest, daftest people", and saw Jack Cade as a neo-fascist from the National Front. To help clarify some moments in the play, additional lines were taken from the 1594 quarto publication of the play, The First part of the Contention betwixt the two famous Houses of Yorke and Lancaster. The origin of that text, which varies in many places from the standard (First Folio) text of the play, provides lines in scenes 1.1, 1.3, and 2.1.

The Prefaces to Shakespeare episode for The Second Part of Henry the Sixt was presented by Brewster Mason who had played Warwick in the 1963 RSC production The Wars of the Roses directed by John Barton and Peter Hall. The Shakespeare in Perspective episode was presented by historian Michael Wood.

===== Reception =====
Michael Manheim saw the production as effective in promoting a pacifist view of the plays, removing any glory from the many battle sequences. He praised Howell's ability to give each battle an individual feeling. Manheim was struck by Bernard Hill's performance as York, taking the audience on a journey while convincingly developing "the lingering medieval 'honor' which underlies York's actions". Stanley Wells, in the Times Literary Supplement, was especially admiring of Chapman's performance as Suffolk and MacNamara as Young Clifford. Benson, too, came into his own in a "delicate performance", "making Henry both pathetically ineffectual and truly saintly". Wells admired the death of the Clerk and all of the Cade scenes which "have so timeless an impetus and vitality" that they might belong to a newly-commissioned modern television play. Wells concluded that this "is real translation of Shakespeare into the medium of television".

==== The Third Part of Henry the Sixt ====
- Directed by Jane Howell
- Produced by Shaun Sutton
- Designed by Oliver Bayldon
- Taping dates: 10–17 February 1982
- First transmitted in the UK: 16 January 1983
- First transmitted in the US: 24 April and 1 May 1983
- Running time (PAL DVD): 211 minutes

Cast

- John Benfield as Earl of Northumberland/Huntsman/Warwick's Messenger (uncredited)
- Peter Benson as King Henry VI
- Gerald Blackmore as Messenger to Warwick
- Antony Brown as Lewis, King of France/Sir John Montgomery/Lieutenant of the Tower (uncredited)
- Michael Byrne as Marquess of Montague/Father that killed his son
- Paul Chapman as Earl Rivers
- Ron Cook as Richard, Duke of Gloucester
- Rowena Cooper as Lady Elizabeth Grey, later Queen to Edward IV
- Arthur Cox as Duke of Somerset/Sir John Mortimer (uncredited)
- David Daker as Lord Hastings
- Mathew David as Edmund, Earl of Rutland
- Brian Deacon as Earl of Oxford
- Tenniel Evans as Messenger to York/First Keeper/First Watchman/Sir William Stanley (uncredited)
- Derek Farr as Duke of Exeter/Mayor of York/Rutland's Tutor (uncredited)/Second Watchman (uncredited)/Nobleman (uncredited)
- Julia Foster as Queen Margaret
- Derek Fuke as Earl of Westmoreland/Post/Third Watchman (uncredited)/Clifford's Messenger (uncredited)
- Alex Guard as Son that Killed his Father/Marquess of Dorset
- Bernard Hill as the Duke of York
- Paul Jesson as George, Duke of Clarence
- Merelina Kendall as Lady Bona
- Oengus MacNamara as Young Clifford/Messenger to Warwick/Messenger to Henry (uncredited)
- Brian Protheroe as Edward, Earl of March, later Edward IV
- Nick Reding as Edward, Prince of Wales
- Mark Wing-Davey as Earl of Warwick
- Peter Wyatt as Duke of Norfolk/Second Keeper (uncredited)
- Tim Fuke as the Young Richmond

===== Behind the scenes =====
The Battle of Tewkesbury. Note the similarity in the costumes of the two sets of combatants. It is virtually impossible to tell the Yorkists from the Lancastrians.

This episode was filmed on the same set as The First Part of Henry the Sixt and The Second Part of Henry the Sixt. However, designer Oliver Bayldon altered the set so it would appear to be falling apart, as England descended into an even worse state of chaos. The cyclorama around the set was repainted with grey rolled over the gauze. Said Bayldon: "The adventure playground has become burned and charred—colours have been subdued to black and grey, and the colour of charred timber". The fights were designed to have very strong violence here, deliberately in contrast to the "knockabout" violence of The First Part.

The scene where Richard kills Henry has three biblical references carefully worked out by Howell: as Richard drags Henry away, his arms spread out into a crucified position; on the table at which he sat are seen bread and wine; and in the background, an iron crossbar is illuminated against the black stone wall. Howell's editing uses more frequent cuts as the tetralogy progresses, emphasising the growing violence and tension in a divided England. Although the tetralogy takes place over decades, Howell chose not to focus on heavy ageing makeup. As Shakespeare's fidelity to historical fact is often not accurate, and the theatricality of the plays was already being emphasised, Howell decreed that any ageing makeup would be restricted to minor details.

The Prefaces to Shakespeare episode for The Third Part of Henry the Sixt was presented by Brewster Mason who had played Warwick in the 1963 RSC production The Wars of the Roses directed by John Barton and Peter Hall. The Shakespeare in Perspective episode was presented by historian Michael Wood.

===== Reception =====
Michael Mannheim, in Shakespeare on Film Newsletter, was highly impressed, calling the tetralogy "a fascinating, fast paced and surprisingly tight-knit study in political and national deterioration." G. M. Pearce, in Cahiers Élisabéthains, admired the many touching moments throughout, and was impressed by Foster's complete transformation across the tetralogy. Pearce found Benson's voice well-suited to the part but annoyed that he didn't seem visibly aged throughout the three plays, while Cooper was more convincing as the Queen than during her character's earlier scenes. Ron Cook created a Richard with a strong personality, bringing out a lot of the script's dark humour, but he was "short on personal charm" and didn't make the most of the poetry in the dialogue. Russell Davies, in Time, praised Cooper and Foster, but found Cook underwhelming: "not so much a lump of foul deformity, more a disaffected pensionee of the Injured Jockeys' Fund".

For Stanley Wells, in the Times Literary Supplement, Howell displayed "great cunning" in her direction of the tetralogy, effectively shifting from the anti-naturalistic feel of the earlier instalments to something more palpably realistic. He praised Warwick's death scene for the way Mark Wing-Davey gave a personal significance to choric lines that many actors would treat with a broad emotional style. Foster, as Queen Margaret, was "both charming and vicious, a siren and a spitfire". Her scene taunting York was a highlight of the cycle, with Bernard Hill also showing "splendid authority and fire" as York. However Wells questioned the use of a variety of regional accents, which were effective to help differentiate the many characters played by the same actors, but sometimes seemed at odds with those characters' social status.

==== The Tragedy of Richard III ====
- Directed by Jane Howell
- Produced by Shaun Sutton
- Designed by Oliver Bayldon
- Taping dates: 31 March-6 April 1982
- First transmitted in the UK: 23 January 1983
- First transmitted in the US: 2 May 1983
- Running time (PAL DVD): 239 minutes

Cast

- Peter Benson as King Henry VI/Priest (uncredited)
- Antony Brown as Sir Richard Ratcliffe
- David Burke as Sir William Catesby
- Michael Byrne as Duke of Buckingham
- Anne Carroll as Jane Shore
- Paul Chapman as Earl Rivers/Archbishop of Canterbury (uncredited)
- Ron Cook as Richard III
- Rowena Cooper as Queen Elizabeth
- Arthur Cox as Lord Grey/Lord Mayor of London/Sir Christopher (uncredited)
- Annette Crosbie as Duchess of York
- David Daker as Lord Hastings
- Brian Deacon as Second Citizen/First Messenger/Earl of Richmond
- Jeremy Dimmick as Young Duke of York
- Tenniel Evans as Stanley, Earl of Derby/Archbishop of York
- Derek Farr as Sir Robert Brackenbury/Earl of Surrey/Scrivener (uncredited)/Third Citizen (uncredited)/Bishop of Ely (uncredited)
- Dorian Ford as Edward, Prince of Wales
- Julia Foster as Queen Margaret
- Derek Fuke as Second Murderer/Sir Thomas Vaughan/Richard's Fourth Messenger (uncredited)
- Alex Guard as Marquess of Dorset
- Bernard Hill as First Murderer/Sir William Brandon (uncredited)/Sheriff of Wiltshire (uncredited)
- Paul Jesson as George, Duke of Clarence/Pursuivant (uncredited)/Richard's Third Messenger (uncredited)
- Patsy Kensit as Lady Margaret Plantagenet
- Rusty Livingston as Page to Richard
- Oengus MacNamara as Halberdier/Lord Lovell/Elizabeth's Messenger (uncredited)/Richard's First Messenger (uncredited)
- Brian Protheroe as Edward IV/Sir Walter Herbert (uncredited)/Richard's Second Messenger (uncredited)
- Nick Reding as Ghost of the Prince of Wales
- Stephen Rooney as Edward Plantagenet
- Zoë Wanamaker as Lady Anne
- Mark Wing-Davey as Sir James Tyrrell/Sir James Blount (uncredited)/First Citizen (uncredited)
- Peter Wyatt as Duke of Norfolk/Keeper (uncredited)/Stanley's Messenger (uncredited)

===== Behind the scenes =====
The final image of the episode – the "reverse pietà" – divided critics, but for director Jane Howell was a vital aspect of the thematic design of the production

This episode was filmed on the same set as the three Henry VI plays. However, designer Oliver Bayldon altered the set so it would appear to be a ruin, as England reached its lowest point of chaos. The various doors in the set, which were prominent in the previous instalments, are now boarded up and derelict. For Bayldon, "the play-park of Henry VI Part 1 is now Belfast. Although the overall colour design is dark, there are new splashes of colour on the doors, playing up the higher level of comedy in this play. Green, which had previously not been used in the design, appears for the first time on Richmond's banners, giving the feeling of his arrival breathing life into England. For the costumes, Howell wanted "the effect of three-piece suits" in a medieval vein, with sleeker, cleaner-looking costumes than earlier in the tetralogy. The sequence with the Lord Mayor putting on old armour allowed Howell to make the direct visual comparison back to the bright costumes of the previous plays. To show Richard without his shirt on, in the final sequence, fifteen prosthetic humps were made to find one that would look the most natural.

As this version of Richard III functioned as the fourth part of a series, it meant that much of the text usually cut in standalone productions could remain. The most obvious beneficiary of this was the character of Margaret, whose role, if not removed completely, is usually truncated. Textual editor David Snodin was especially pleased that a filmed version of Richard III was finally presenting Margaret's full role. Director Jane Howell also saw the unedited nature of the tetralogy as important for Richard himself, arguing that without the three Henry VI plays "it is impossible to appreciate Richard except as some sort of diabolical megalomaniac," whereas in the full context of the tetralogy "you've seen why he is created, you know how such a man can be created: he was brought up in war, he saw and knew nothing else from his father but the struggle for the crown, and if you've been brought up to fight, if you've got a great deal of energy, and physical handicaps, what do you do? You take to intrigue and plotting." The production is unusual amongst filmed Richards insofar as no one is killed on camera, other than Richard himself. This was a conscious choice on the part of Howell; "you see nobody killed; just people going away, being taken away – so much like today; they're just removed. There's a knock on the door and people are almost willing to go. There's no way out of it." Howell emphasised the recurring use of actors, bringing back many of the most prominent faces of previous plays in smaller parts, so that "Richard III should be like a nightmare. Faces will keep coming back".

At 239 minutes, this production was the longest episode in the entire series, and when the series was released on DVD in 2005, it was the only adaptation split over two disks. Of the 3,887 lines constituting the First Folio text of the play, Howell cut only 72; roughly 1.8% of the total.

The Prefaces to Shakespeare episode for The Tragedy of Richard III was presented by Edward Woodward who had played Richard in a 1982 Ludlow Festival production directed by David William. The Shakespeare in Perspective episode was presented by novelist Rosemary Anne Sisson.

===== Reception =====
Nancy Banks-Smith, in the Guardian, had commenced the cycle unimpressed. But she concluded that this production was the "high tide" of a highly successful experiment, praising the use of repertory company and for Howell making the plays feel "positively modern" in their politics. Cook was "vivid and original" in the title role, unafraid to contradict previous Richards. Banks-Smith declared that, of the BBC series thus far, these had been the most enjoyable. Lee Winfrey, in the Philadelphia Inquirer, found Cook to be a surprising but successful choice as Richard, with flawless diction and a "face an ever-shifting map of malice". His energy and creativity never flag across four hours, and he's well accompanied by Byrne and Wanamaker in particular. Winfrey described the production as "high-velocity Shakespeare, moving fast along his rails of rhetoric from beginning to end". In the Times Literary Supplement, Stanley Wells understood Cook's "legitimate interpretation" of the title role as "an amorally intelligent urchin" but concluded that Howell and Cook's approach made the play unusually anti-climactic. Usually productions of Richard III are dominated by a virtuouso performance, whereas this experience felt more sombre. For Dennis Bingham, Howell's tetralogy made him "convinced that TV was practically made for the Bard", although the series to date had suggested otherwise.

Analysing the production, Hugh M. Richmond liked the use of a moderate Yorkshire accent for Richard, which matched the historical Richard's place as an outsider at court, and fitted Shakespeare's method of using of accent and regional language to help define character. The choric scenes between the female characters had "never before been played so fully and convincingly", benefiting from both being uncut and the intimacy of the camera. But Richmond found that Howell ultimately didn't understand the play. By showing Henry as a saintly man, Howell ignored the text's depiction of Henry's "well-meaning incompetence", a non-political man in a time when politics was needed. Richmond argued that, while Shakespeare no doubt saw the horror of war, he was not a pacifist like Howell but saw war as a part of the "complex balance of social forces" throughout history, building up to the renewal of the Tudor dynasty under Richmond. Foster, too, was very strong as Queen Margaret but was playing a modern idea of a woman maintaining her resilience in the face of destruction. As a result, she lost some of Margaret's choric "ritual power" that Shakespeare intended for the character, whose growing madness was equated in the Elizabethan mind with prophecy. Richmond's conclusion was that many critics also did not see these issues, as they share Howell's "unconscious frame of reference" that is contemporary, not Elizabethan.

The final shot of the production divided some critics. The production ended with Margaret sitting atop a pyramid of corpses (played by all of the major actors who had appeared throughout the tetralogy) cradling Richard's dead body and laughing manically, an image Edward Burns refers to as "a blasphemous pietà." Howell herself referred to it as a "reverse pietà," and defended it by arguing that the tetralogy is bigger than Richard III, so to end by simply showing Richard's death and Richmond's coronation is to diminish the roles that have gone before; the vast amount of death that has preceded the end of Richard III cannot be ignored. R. Chris Hassel Jr., although concluding that the final act of the play was "superb", remarks of this scene that "our last taste is not the restoration of order and good governance, but of chaos and arbitrary violence." For Hassel, this was "perversely contradictory" of the play's thematic integrity that was designed to build thematically from division to unification. Hugh M. Richmond says the scene gives the production a "cynical conclusion," as "it leaves our impressions of the new King Henry VII's reign strongly coloured by Margaret's malevolent glee at the destruction of her enemies that Henry has accomplished for her." For Michael Manheim, the final shot was a successful transformation of Margaret into a "kind of death-goddess". John J. O'Connor, in the New York Times, found the final shot "a stunning coda for this admirable production". Stanley Wells, otherwise greatly admiring Howell's approach, declared that the final shot was "a melodramatically simplistic conclusion to a richly varied experience". In Shakespeare Quarterly, Roger Warren assessed the tetralogy as a "continuously absorbing" and "fascinating" production, concluding that Howell was deliberately contradicting Shakespeare's intended optimistic restoration with a "forced ending" that focused on Richard and Margaret.

=== Season 6 ===
==== Cymbeline ====
- Directed by Elijah Moshinsky
- Produced by Shaun Sutton
- Designed by Barbara Gosnold
- Taping dates: 29 July-5 August 1982
- First transmitted in the UK: 10 July 1983
- First transmitted in the US: 20 December 1982
- Running time (PAL DVD): 174 minutes

Cast

- Richard Johnson as Cymbeline
- Hugh Thomas as Cornelius
- Aimée Delamain as Gentlewoman
- Claire Bloom as Queen
- Helen Mirren as Imogen
- Michael Pennington as Posthumus
- John Kane as Pisanio
- Nicholas Young as Lord
- Paul Jesson as Cloten
- Robert Lindsay as Iachimo
- Geoffrey Lumsden as Philario
- Patsy Smart as Helen
- Allan Hendrick as Frenchman
- Nigel Robson as Singer
- Terence McGinity as British Captain
- Graham Crowden as Caius Lucius
- Michael Gough as Belarius
- Geoffrey Burridge as Guiderius
- David Creedon as Arviragus
- Patricia Hayes as Soothsayer
- Peter Aldwyn as British Captain
- Ray Mort as Gaoler
- Madge Ryan as Mother
- Marius Goring as Sicilius Leonatus
- Michael Hordern as Jupiter

===== Behind the scenes =====
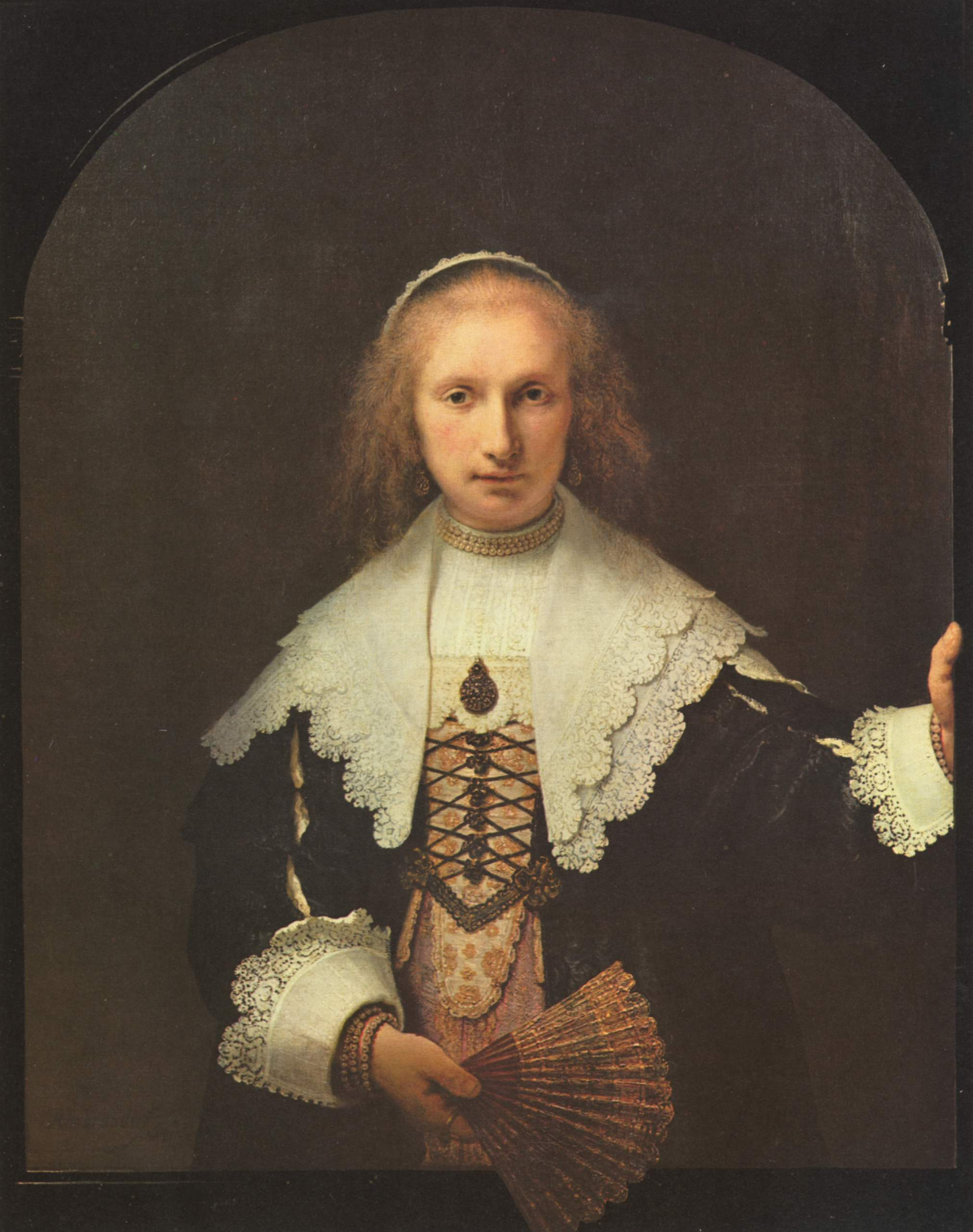
Rembrandt's portrait of Agatha Bas, which inspired Elijah Moshinsky's concept of Imogen.

From this episode on, the show featured no unique theme music; the opening titles were scored with music composed specifically for the episode; although the new title sequence introduced by Miller at the start of the third season continued to be used.

Moshinsky took many of his visual inspirations from the artworks of Rembrandt and Vermeer. He was inspired by Rembrandt's portrait of Agatha Bas for his conception of Imogen as someone "quite severe and yet young and quite princess-like".

Mohsinsky saw the play's focus as moral ambiguity, with Pisanio a central symbol as no-one knows whether he's good or bad. He viewed this as the opposite of his production of All's Well That Ends Well; where that was a "social, realistic" world, Cymbeline became a "nightmare realism". Moshinsky felt this to be a dark play in which only the literal intervention of the gods stops it from becoming a tragedy, and thus it needed "the intensity and neuroticism of a tragedy". Moshinsky shot the scene of Iachimo watching the sleeping Imogen in the same way as he shot the scene of Imogen finding Cloten in bed beside her; as Iachimo leaves the room, the camera is at the head of the bed, and as such, Imogen appears upside-down in frame. Later, when she awakes to find the headless Cloten, the scene begins with the camera in the same position, with Imogen once again upside-down; "the inverted images visually bind the perverse experiences, both nightmarish, both sleep related, both lit by one candle." The decision to have Imogen be almost successfully seduced by Iachimo was, Moshinsky told the Radio Times, because Imogen should not be "a good person in a world of evil" but a victim of Iachimo, who aggressively "but cunningly wheedles the evil side out of other people ... His evil depends on having made the other person guilty".

During the episode, the battle between the Romans and the Britons is never shown on screen; all that is seen is a single burning building, intended to indicate the general strife; we never see the defeat of Iachimo, Posthumus sparing him or Iachimo's reaction. Moshinsky did not want to expunge the political context of the play, but he was not especially interested in the military theme, and so removed most of it, with an aim to focus instead on the personal. The cuts were designed to "make a complex tale clearer by ridding it of comparative irrelevancies and highlighting certain moments and themes". Many cuts emerged during rehearsal, as Moshinsky discovered scenes that didn't fit with the "high level of emotional intensity" h thought necessary to realise the play on screen; the second half was more rigorously cut, including material with Belarius and the princes. He also sought to restructure scenes and sequences, especially in Act IV, as the audience would build connections to several characters, and would relate more if intercut between them rather than having slow sequences of development with each one in turn.

The Prefaces to Shakespeare episode for Cymbeline was presented by Jeffery Dench, who had played Cymbeline in a 1979 RSC production directed by David Jones. The Shakespeare in Perspective episode was presented by dramatist and journalist Dennis Potter.

===== Reception =====
For Nancy Banks-Smith, in the Guardian, Mirren "missed some of Imogen's sparkle" but managed to "make the ridiculous marvellous" in difficult scenes such as the discovery of the headless body. Pennington stood out as being so powerful in both his jealousy and remorse that Posthumus's illogical plot almost made scene, but Hordern's Jupiter was not godlike enough. Henry E. Jacobs, in Shakespeare on Film Newsletter, thought that the distinctions between the various 'worlds' of the play were too blurred into one "generalised eighteenth-century milieu". There were some negatives, such as the cutting of the battle and Iachimo's subsequent contrition, which leaves the character's change of heart unclear and unmotivated, and the many static painting-like scenes. But overall Moshinsky showed a strong understanding of characters, eliciting superb performances, including Bloom's uniquely subtle Queen, Johnson's realistic Cymbeline, Pennington avoiding too much excess, and Jesson a wonderful "mixture of fop, oaf, braggart". Lindsay and Mirren gave masterful performances, Lindsay avoiding the common portrayal of Iachimo as a "bored dilettante", instead a lascivious voyeur, and Mirren giving an intelligent Helen who remained noble but without the bland "paragon of virtue" approach of many 19th century performances of the role. In response to Jacobs, Peggy Muñoz Simonds argued that the production overall was "both convincing and moving" but raised concerns about the Jupiter scene. With the Jacobean imagery, it would have been unclear to audience members who Jupiter was, although the director included eagle imagery elsewhere in the production. "Moshinsky didn't even try" to convey the complex symbolism that Jupiter invoked for Shakespeare, including issues of rebirth and resurrection.

In the New York Times, John J. O'Connor acknowledged that the play itself adds odd plot devices "very near to the point of absurdity" but, as had become expected, the series excelled at the lesser-known plays. This was a "superb" production, benefiting from Moshinsky's experience as an opera director in dealing with fantastic plot. The pacing was "uncluttered and brisk", with Mirren "emotionally appealing" and Bloom standing out among a strong cast. "An intelligent and rewarding production". G. M. Pearce, in Cahiers Élisabéthains, enjoyed the production overall, singling out Bloom's "unrestrained venom" in her performance as the Queen. Mary Harron, writing for the New Statesman, gave a mixed review. Jesson perfectly judged his approach as Cloten, and Mirren was a joy as Imogen. But Moshinsky erred when he "decided to lace up this mixture of barbarism, myth, and Snow White fairy tale wonder into starched, high-ruffed and desperately measured 17th century political drama". And the sensual nature of Imogen's attraction to Iachimo was "gratuitous sensationalism". Julian Barnes, in the Observer, largely agreed. He liked that Mirren "sexed the play up", debunking the more common Puritan-seeming approach to the text. But Moshinsky focusing on a sense of quiet court intrigue "sore-thumbed large chunks of the text" that were designed to be more exciting, and that the miscellaneous locations and pieces of the text didn't come together, or even feel like they were part of one unified production.

Gordon P. Jones discussed this production alongside Moshinsky's other work for the series, and compared him to 17th century poet Nahum Tate, who heavily adapted Shakespeare's works to meet contemporary tastes. Jones argued that, by cutting much of the complexity, Moshinsky's effect was "to simplify, radically, the baroque narrative structure of the play", giving the audience only a watered-down understanding of Shakespeare's intention. For Katherine Duncan-Jones, in the Times Literary Supplement, Moshinsky's aesthetic mimicry of the Dutch Masters was the highlight, with small pleasing touches such as Hayes's performance as the Soothsayer and Delamain's Rembrandt-looking Gentlewoman, which pulled a lot from a small amount of text. But, overall, she felt Moshinsky had neutered the play. "Almost all of the poetry" was lost, alongside a decent amount of plot, "and all the sweet poignancy which made this a favourite play of Keats, Swinburne and Tennyson". Duncan-Jones found the production too static in its use of tableaux, and sometimes at odds with the text, such as the indoor funeral for Fidele that removed the sense of rural landscape. Ultimately, the director's attempt at emotional intensity was wrong for the "gentle, almost sentimental texture" of the play.

In Shakespeare Quarterly, Roger Warren was moved by Moshinsky "sombrely beautiful Jacobean interiors", Bloom as a "striking Medici Queen Mother", speaking the verse impeccably, and Lindsay, so skillful with Iachimo's attempted seduction that the textual difficulties of that long scene vanished. Gough was a standout, and—in spite of being sung rather than spoken—"Fear No More" gave a "magical effect". By contrast, Hordern's scene as Jupiter was "oddly unspectacular". Posthumus was too realistically treated in contrition that he became "grotesque" like a character from the later scenes of King Lear. Warren questioned how Iachimo could see Imogen's discreetly-located mole, when he was shirtless rather than her. Ultimately, the reordering and cutting of sequences in the second half of the play made things "unnecessarily chaotic". Warren approved of the slow pan shot to Imogen at I.vi, which emphasises her isolation at court. Johnson was "caricatured" and "ranting" as Cymbeline. The most effective scenes were those between Posthumus and Iachimo, which fit both the intimacy of television and Moshinsky's stated tragic approach. Pennington gave an intelligent reading of the text. Gough in particular gave a "superbly rounded characterisation" as Belarius, and he and the princes brought some needed humanity to a confused final scene. Moshinsky's editing is often so abrupt between scenes as to confuse new viewers as to the actions of the plot. Pennington in the later sequences has to resort to overacting as some the key moments of his character development have been cut, while having Cloten unable to fit into Posthumus's clothes may be funny in the moment but makes a mockery of the later scene where Imogen is supposed to assume the headless Cloten is Posthumus based on their similar physiques. Warren disliked that Moshinsky re-interpreted Shakespeare, such as Patsy Smart's serving woman, delivering lines malevolently that had no such intention in the script. But he concluded that sometimes the smallest moments said more than entire scenes, as when a shot captures Imogen simply closing her eyes as she comes to understand Iachimo's plot in the final scene.

==== Macbeth ====
- Directed by Jack Gold
- Produced by Shaun Sutton
- Designed by Gerry Scott
- Taping dates: 22–28 June 1982
- First transmitted in the UK: 5 November 1983
- First transmitted in the US: 17 October 1983
- Running time (PAL DVD): 147 minutes

Cast

- Brenda Bruce as First Witch
- Eileen Way as Second Witch
- Anne Dyson as Third Witch
- Mark Dignam as Duncan
- James Hazeldine as Malcolm
- Christopher Ellison as Captain
- John Rowe as Lennox
- Gawn Grainger as Ross
- Nicol Williamson as Macbeth
- Ian Hogg as Banquo
- David Lyon as Angus
- Jane Lapotaire as Lady Macbeth
- Gordon Kane as First Messenger
- Alistair Henderson as Fleance
- James Bolam as Porter
- Tony Doyle as Macduff
- Tom Bowles as Donalbain
- Will Leighton as Old Man
- Eamon Boland as Seyton/Third Murderer
- Barry Lowe as First Murderer
- Christopher Reich as Second Murderer
- Denyse Alexander as Gentlewoman
- Jill Baker as Lady Macduff
- Crispin Mair as Son to Macduff
- Philip Dunbar as Murderer
- Rodney Cardiff as Murderer
- Mark Lindsay Chapman as Murderer
- John Woodnutt as Doctor
- Matthew Long as Menteith
- Peter Porteous as Caithness
- William Abney as Old Siward
- Christopher Fulford as Second Messenger
- Nicholas Coppin as Young Siward

===== Behind the scenes =====
This episode was shot with a 360-degree cycloramic backcloth in the background which could be used as representative of a general environment, with much use made of open space.

The Prefaces to Shakespeare episode for Macbeth was presented by Sara Kestelman who had played Lady Macbeth in a 1982 RSC production directed by Howard Davies. The Shakespeare in Perspective episode was presented by crime writer and poet Julian Symons.

===== Reception =====
David Richard, in the Washington Post, felt this was "one of the strongest offerings in the series to date". Williamson's "harsh" voice and Lapotaire's "sleek grace" combined to give a production of true distinction. Arthur Unger, in the Christian Science Monitor, praised Williamson for an "unforgettable" portrayal: "He grasps one of the most fascinating Shakespearean roles like a dog with a bone in his mouth" and creates a Macbeth that will be "remembered for all time", even if he sometimes mumbled and underplayed the role. His was a "savage and riven ...naïve and self-deceived" character. Meanwhile, Lapotaire sometimes exaggerated to a ludicrous degree as part of a strong characterisation. Unger concluded that, while Gold's production couldn't always decide whether it wanted to be stylised or naturalistic, "it is not a perfect Macbeth but it is an unforgettable Macbeth". In the Globe and Mail, Rick Groen appreciated the "streamlined production" in Gold's "subdued, almost elliptical interpretation", which highlighted Williamson's talent at creating an intimate Macbeth: "the inward view proves far more horrific than any outward show". Lapotaire was every bit Williamson's equal, playing a successful game of power and sexual desire. The bleak setting and moral equivocation of the characters were well-utilised, along with the ending implying that Fleance will continue the trend of bloodshed.

Steven Reddicliffe, in the Los Angeles Times, greatly enjoyed the witches and found Williamson strong albeit a bit too frenzied. For John J. O'Connor, in the New York Times, this was a production assembled with care, with strong performances from Dignam, Hogg, Doyle, and Hazeldine, and an impactful Lady Macduff murder scene. Gold captures and holds the "terrifyingly dark model" of the play. O'Connor assessed both Lapotaire and Williamson as having had uneven careers, but were truly great at their best, as here. Lapotaire had an intensity to her Lady Macbeth that worked "with chilling effectiveness", and Williamson understated the text with clarity, retaining the poetry while portraying a man "fighting vainly to keep his passions under control". In Shakespeare on Film Newsletter, Michael Mullin found that the BBC had "fulfilled much of the promise so sadly lacking" in earlier instalments of the series. The expressionistic sets were effective in Gold's "clear-cut reimagining" of the play, and having the ghosts appear only in Macbeth's mind worked well on screen. Williamson found new readings of every speech in a style of line-reading that was not musical but hugely impactful at conveying his internal struggles. Hogg, Doyle, and Hazeldine gave "fine performances by first-rate actors" in a "convincing and consistent production" that would reward repeat viewing. Lapotaire's "snug gown and feline grace" made Lady Macbeth's power credible, and she conveyed a character who acts on her desire for power without thinking through the consequences until it is too late.

G. M. Pearce, in Cahiers Élisabéthains, thought that the production was successful in its relentless pacing but sacrificed the "imaginative and poetical aspects. Williamson's breathy line delivery conveyed Macbeth's anguish well but "murdered most of the poetry". Bernice W. Kliman sees this as a production based in chiasmus, with Macbeth going from weakness to strength, and Lady Macbeth from strength to weakness. Lapotaire making an orgasmic reading of her line "unsex me here" was effective in showing that she was not wanting to be less sensual, but to "take away her woman's repugnance for violence". Gold wisely shot the Macbeths' first duologue, including the reference to their own deceased children, with both faces in the frame, which effectively conveyed the characters' pain. Williamson developed an intelligent and evil Macbeth, finding the contradictions in Macbeth's lines that show a strong yet deluded character. Lapotaire is "varied, believable, and mesmerising", among an effective design and a production that "frankly confronts the mystery and power of demonic energy". Sometimes, however, Gold's camera did not provide the most useful reading for the audience, as when he takes too long during the banquet to show the guests' reaction to Macbeth's mental breakdown. And Kliman questioned that, if some other characters like Seyton are portrayed as unrepentantly evil, it became unclear why Macbeth's descent was a tragedy worthy of being told.

In the Observer, Julian Barnes dismissed Gold's Macbeth as "not a convincing production" with little of note, and Lapotaire erratic with her speaking of the verse. Williamson, meanwhile, could not "speak a single Shakespearean line without some false, bellowing emphasis". Peter Kemp, in the Times Literary Supplement, liked the sets and design, and Gold's "intelligently traditional" approach to the overall play, and the Birnam Wood design and lighting were ideal. Kemp was disappointed to lose Malcolm's speech described King Edward's "royal touch", which effectively contrasted Macbeth's evil. However the production was let down by the two lead performances. Lapotaire gave a "fatally lightweight performance", only becoming chilling in the sleepwalking scene. Williamson played Macbeth with two different vocal registers, as if schizophrenic, leading to the later scenes full of "ogreish howls and rapid simian gibber".

Nancy Banks-Smith, in the Guardian, found this "colourless" in comparison to Trevor Nunn's 1979 televised version of his Royal Shakespeare Company production. While acknowledging that Gold had an individual approach to the play, the abstract design forced a lot of focus on Williamson's Macbeth, whose line-readings had "odd emphases and changes of pace", while Lady Macbeth shouldn't be so sexualised during her "unsex me" scene. H. R. Coursen thought that the production simply "wasn't very good", with Williamson giving "an absolute misreading of the script" in the wrong kind of voice for the character, and Lapotaire's sexuality unconvincing. The witches were not effective, while the final ominous sequence seemed unconvincing. For a production that had 'no frills', the audience focus would be on the acting, which wasn't good enough. Peter Ackroyd, in the London Times, was unsatisfied with the characterisations offered by Gold and the leads: "the closer the camera came to the Macbeths the more murky and formless they became".

==== The Comedy of Errors ====
- Directed by James Cellan Jones
- Produced by Shaun Sutton
- Designed by Don Homfray
- Taping dates: 3–9 November 1983
- First transmitted in the UK: 24 December 1983
- First transmitted in the US: 20 February 1984
- Running time (PAL DVD): 109 minutes

Cast

- Cyril Cusack as Aegeon
- Charles Gray as Solinus, Duke of Ephesus
- Nicolas Chagrin as Master of the Mime
- Bunny Reed as Gaoler
- Michael Kitchen as The Antipholi
- Roger Daltrey as The Dromios
- Noel Johnson as First Merchant
- Suzanne Bertish as Adriana
- Joanne Pearce as Luciana
- Marsha Fitzalan as Luce
- Sam Dastor as Angelo
- David Kelly as Balthazar
- Alfred Hoffman as Second Merchant
- Frank Williams as Officer
- Ingrid Pitt as Courtezan
- Geoffrey Rose as Pinch
- Wendy Hiller as Aemelia
- Peter MacKriel as Messenger

===== Behind the scenes =====
Opening shot of the episode showing the map of the region on the floor of the stylised market set; at the top of the shot is the abbey, top left is the Phoenix, bottom left is the Centaur, bottom right is the Porpentine, top right is a market stall. The entrance to the bay is opposite the abbey, out of shot.

Director James Cellan Jones felt very strongly that the play was not just a farce, but included a serious side, specifically represented by the character of Aegeon, who has lost his family and is about to lose his life. In several productions Jones had seen, Aegeon was completely forgotten between the first and last scenes, and determined to avoid this, and hence give the production a more serious air, Jones had Aegeon wandering around Ephesus throughout the episode.

The entire production takes place on a stylised set, the floor of which is a giant map of the region, shown in its entirety in the opening and closing aerial shots; all of the main locations (the Porpentine, the Abbey, the Phoenix, the market etc.) are located in a circular pattern around the centre map. While most stage productions have separate actors playing each Antipholus and each Dromio, Jones chose to double-cast the actors and use special effects for the final scene. The production's composer, Richard Holmes, appears onscreen as the street band's harpsichord player. The sea backdrop had staples placed through it, so the light would glimmer in the sunlight and then moonlight.

The Prefaces to Shakespeare episode for The Comedy of Errors was presented by Roger Rees who had played Antipholus of Syracuse in a 1976 RSC production directed by Trevor Nunn. The Shakespeare in Perspective episode was presented by comedian Roy Hudd.

===== Reception =====
The Boston Globe arts critic, Ed Siegel, considered this the most accessible and enjoyable of the BBC series thus far with wonderful actors and design. Daltrey was "exhilarating" in his screwball turn as the Dromios. In the New York Times, John J. O'Connor enjoyed everything about the production, with Michael Kitchen "deft" and Jones wisely casting greatly experienced actors—Cusack, Gray, and Hiller—for the characters with long speeches. O'Connor liked that Jones stressed the "more ominous aspects" of the play and created a design that emphasised the playing space. He noted that Daltrey's casting was heavily emphasised in the BBC's marketing of the production, and it luckily paid off, with Daltrey capturing "the music and sense" of Shakespeare's words. G. M. Pearce, in Cahiers Élisabéthains, considered this a "sparkling production" and appreciated that having the same actor play each twin made the confusion all the more realistic.

Jeanne Addison Roberts, in Shakespeare on Film Newsletter, ranked this production among the very best of the series, with praise for Jones's camera that neither got stuck with endless images of talking heads like Julius Caesar, nor tried to muffle the play's theatricality with naturalism like Antony and Cleopatra. Roberts enjoyed the "sense of spaciousness, mystery and hidden possibilities" in Jones's set, which equalled any stage production. Cusack in particular earned praise, convincing the audience of his pathos and desolation, yet always allowing the audience to enjoy both comedy and tragedy, given the scene parodied him even as it engaged with his sorrow. "We owe ... Jones and his company an enduring debt of gratitude".

In Literature/Film Quarterly, Robert E. Wood appreciated that Jones found a classical unity of place in his set, which felt clearly three dimensional, unlike many previous instalments in the series. Having characters address the camera increased the intimacy of the comedy, which Wood felt the audience was more open to on television than in film. The choice to have the same actor play each twin was risky but successful, as the audience came to know each character separately and then was delighted by the success of the visual effects at the end. Ultimately the techniques of television "sharpen the contrasts inherent in this Shakespearean text without distorting its natural rhythm".

By contrast, Stanley Wells, in the Times Literary Supplement, found that the comedy raised a chuckle but few outright laughs. While the play could be a delicate dessert on stage, "Here it is not so much a soufflé as a pudding". Roger Warren, in Shakespeare Quarterly, liked Jones's choice of a "quiet, small-scale realism" and his commedia dell'arte touches, which were well suited to television. Jones managed throughout to retain the comedy while giving his characters legitimate motivations, rather than simply riotous farce as sometimes shown on stage. Bertish stood out as the strongest performance, and Kitchen nicely distinguished his Antipholi. However, Warren thought Cusack poorly cast, and ruined the opening monologue with his delivery, "running on phrases regardless of sense". In his desire to keep the story intelligible to a television audience, Jones had his actors speak far slower and more clearly in the long final scene than would happen on stage, reducing the "great crescendo of confusion" that occurs in the best productions.

==== The Two Gentlemen of Verona ====
- Directed by Don Taylor
- Produced by Shaun Sutton
- Designed by Barbara Gosnold
- Taping dates: 25–31 July 1983
- First transmitted in the UK: 27 December 1983
- First transmitted in the US: 23 April 1984
- Running time (PAL DVD): 136 minutes

Cast

- Frank Barrie as Sir Eglamour
- Tessa Peake-Jones as Julia
- Hetta Charnley as Lucetta
- Tyler Butterworth as Proteus
- John Hudson as Valentine
- Nicholas Kaby as Speed
- Michael Byrne as Antonio
- John Woodnutt as Panthino
- Joanne Pearce as Sylvia
- Tony Haygarth as Launce
- Bella as Crab
- David Collings as Thurio
- Paul Daneman as Duke of Milan
- Daniel Flynn as Servant
- Charlotte Richardson as Cupid
- Jonathan Taylor as Cupid
- Bill Badley as Lutenist
- Tom Finucane as Lutenist
- Robin Jeffrey as Lutenist
- Adam Kurakin as First Outlaw
- John Baxter as Second Outlaw
- Andrew Burt as Third Outlaw
- Michael Graham Cox as Host

===== Behind the scenes =====
An outlaw hides in the "Christmas at Selfridge's" set; note the stylised steel 'trees' and tinsel foliage.

The music in this episode was created by Anthony Rooley, who wrote new arrangements of works from Shakespeare's own time, such as John Dowland's piece 'Lachrimae'. Performed by The Consort of Musicke, other musicians whose music was used include William Byrd, Thomas Campion, Anthony Holborne, John Johnson, Thomas Morley and Orazio Vecchi. As no original music was used, Stephen Oliver's theme from seasons three to five was used for the opening titles.

Director Don Taylor initially planned a representational setting for the film; Verona, Milan and the forest were all to be realistic. However, he changed his mind early in preproduction and had production designer Barbara Gosnold go in the opposite direction, choosing a stylised setting. To this end, the forest is composed of metal poles with bits of green tinsel and brown sticks stuck to them (the cast and crew referred to the set as "Christmas at Selfridges"). While the set for Verona was more realistic, that for Milan featured young extras dressed like cherubs. This was to convey the idea that the characters lived in a "Garden of Courtly Love", slightly divorced from everyday reality. Working in tandem with this idea, upon Proteus's arrival in Milan, after meeting Silvia, he is left alone on stage, and the weather suddenly changes from calm and sunny to cloudy and windy, accompanied by a thunderclap. The implication being that Proteus has brought a darkness within him into the garden of courtly delights previously experienced by Silvia.

Although the production is edited in a fairly conventional manner, much of it was shot in extremely long takes, and then edited into sections, rather than actually shooting in sections. Taylor would shoot most of the scenes in single takes, as he felt this enhanced performances and allowed actors to discover aspects which they never would have had everything been broken up into pieces.

The Prefaces to Shakespeare episode for The Two Gentlemen of Verona was presented by Geoffrey Hutchings who had played Launce in a 1969 RSC production directed by Gareth Morgan. The Shakespeare in Perspective episode was presented by journalist Russell Davies.

===== Reception =====
In the New York Times, John J. O'Connor found Taylor succeeded in a "quite charming" production, which was against the odds given the underwhelming source text. Taylor smartly used young actors and gave his design a "never-never land magical quality", leading to a rewarding and "surprisingly diverting" play. G. M. Pearce, in Cahiers Élisabéthains, applauded the "rich colour" of the design, the lyrical use of music, and the lighting. She noted especially how Pearce found "dignity and distance" in her portrayal of Silvia, which justified Proteus's obsession Stanley Wells, in the Times Literary Supplement, enjoyed Pearce's performance and felt she looked lovely, but the role of Silvia remained unrewarding in performance. Meanwhile, Peake-Jones's portrayal of Julia played "against the verse", falling too often into the trap of "maudlin lachrymosity".

Harry Keyishian, in Shakespeare on Film Newsletter, concluded that the play worked very well for television: as an early Shakespeare work, it features a lot of duologues, which work well with two people in shot. The comic dialogues were given "special vitality and charm" by Taylor's cast, especially between Launce and Speed. Taylor's camera placement was adroit and had a strong use of composition for his shots. Taylor enjoyed the decision to interpret the Duke as clearly disliking Thurio, recognising Proteus's hypocrisy, and testing Valentine's love. He appreciated the decision to play the final scene straight, but felt that Taylor somewhat avoided the problem of Valentine's offer of Silvia to his friend after the attempted rape by not showing her reaction to the crucial moment. In Shakespeare Quarterly, Roger Warren disagreed, interpreting Valentine's line to imply "I love Proteus as much as Silvia", rather than "I give Silvia to you". Otherwise, Taylor thought the performances were strong, especially from Butterworth and Hudson, and the "Temple of Love" design in Milan was especially effective when it became clear that Proteus's decision to betray Valentine was desecrating the Temple.

Comparing Warren and Keyishian's views, Patty S. Derrick interpreted the production more in favour of Warren. She observed that Taylor makes important choices early on in the play, by making Proteus baby-faced and clearly discovering love and jealousy for the first time. Because he is reluctant to betray Valentine, and because the friendship theme is threaded into the early production design, it becomes a focus that the audience expects to be concluded. In her forceful lines before the attempted rape, and the way she looks on when Valentine first approaches Proteus, it is clear that Silvia approves of "the bond of heroic friendship". By showing that Proteus clearly perceived the offer as a "noble gesture of friendship", Taylor succeeded in navigating a problematic element of Shakespeare's play.

==== The Tragedy of Coriolanus ====
- Directed by Elijah Moshinsky
- Produced by Shaun Sutton
- Designed by Dick Coles
- Taping dates: 18–26 April 1983
- First transmitted in the UK: 21 April 1984
- First transmitted in the US: 26 March 1984
- Running time (PAL DVD): 145 minutes

Cast

- Paul Jesson as First Citizen
- Ray Roberts as Second Citizen
- Leon Lissek as Third Citizen
- Jon Rumney as Fourth Citizen
- Russell Kilmister as Fifth Citizen
- Joss Ackland as Menenius
- Alan Howard as Caius Marcius
- Patrick Godfrey as Cominius
- John Rowe as First Roman Senator
- Peter Sands as Titus Larcius
- John Burgess as Sicinius
- Anthony Pedley as Brutus
- Mike Gwilym as Aufidius
- Valentine Dyall as Adrian
- Brian Poyser as First Volscian Senator
- Reginald Jessup as Second Volscian Senator
- Irene Worth as Volumnia
- Joanna McCallum as Virgilia
- Patsy Smart as Gentlewoman
- Heather Canning as Valeria
- Jay Ruparelia as Roman Soldier
- Damien Franklin as Young Marcius
- Nicholas Amer as Aedile
- Teddy Kempner as Nicanor
- Stephen Finlay as Citizen of Antium

===== Behind the scenes =====
For the production design of Rome, everywhere except the Senate was to be small and cramped. The idea behind this design choice was to reflect Coriolanus's mindset. He dislikes the notion of the people gathering together for anything, and on such a cramped set, because the alleys and streets are so small, it only takes a few people to make them look dangerously crowded. The red interior of the tent during the scene where Volumnia and the women come to plead for Coriolanus's assistance was intended to be "womblike". When an actor was in close-up, Moshinsky adopted an aesthetic choice of keeping them off-centre in the frame.

Moshinsky had minimal television experience when he first joined the BBC series. Now, he found himself moving away from his earlier "painterly" approach toward productions that engaged more with an interpretative issue in the play. He concluded that it would be difficult to explore the contemporary political relevance of the play on television, because it is not a medium where you can debate directly with the audience, unlike theatre. He felt that "you either direct it as an epic play about a political debate or as a study of an alienated state of mind", and, if the latter, some of the more public sequences could be cut to keep the focus on the interpretation. In the script for the episode, Coriolanus's death scene is played as a fight between himself and Aufidius in front of a large crowd who urge Aufidius to kill him. However, in shooting the scene, Moshinsky changed it so that it takes place in front of a few silent senators, and there is, as such, no real fight. For cutting substantial amounts of the text that were more political and less personal, Moshinsky received hate mail from some American viewers, who found the cutting "sacriligeous".

For the portrayal of Volumnia, Moshinsky and Worth examined what they felt would be the weakness of such a domineering character, and concluded it was in her over-fondness for family. As a result, Volumnia is clearly fond of her daughter-in-law, which is not always the case in stage productions. Moshinsky wanted to make clear "the power of the sexuality" that underlines the relationship between Coriolanus and Aufidius, and motivates their mutual hatred. To emphasises the subtext of homoeroticism, when Caius Marcius fights the Coriolian soldiers, he leaves his shirt on, but when he fights Aufidius in one-on-one combat, he takes it off.

The Prefaces to Shakespeare episode for The Tragedy of Coriolanus was presented by Ian Hogg who had played Coriolanus in a 1972 RSC production directed by Trevor Nunn. The Shakespeare in Perspective episode was presented by General Sir John Hackett.

===== Reception =====
In the New York Times, John J. O'Connor viewed Howard as a "commanding" Coriolanus, displaying all of the character's "magnificent disdain" for the common people. It was a fascinating interpretation of the main character, and his battle sequences with Gwilym's Aufidius were "almost homoerotic danses macabres. Worth was "splendid", delivering the long speeches in the final act "with consummate artistry", while Ackland spoke his lines with "unfailing clarity" and John Summers's lighting was elegant and prefect. Although noting the text had been pared down, it was powerfully served by Moshinsky's production. Lee Winfrey agreed that Howard gave a "definitive reading" of his stage role, never falling into the trap of trying to earn the viewer's sympathy. G. M. Pearce, in Cahiers Élisabéthains, appreciated Gwilym's "sensitive and volatile" Aufidius, who was able to show the relatively uncivilised nature of the Volsces, while Howard's voice was perfect for "metallic resonance" of the verse, and the two leads had a strong and evident bond.

In the Boston Globe, John Engstrom also praised the "transcendent performances" of Howard and Gwilym, with Howard proving himself "a great declamatory actor" for his "controlled, passion, wit, venom, sexiness, irony, introspection". Engstrom praised Worth, too, with her cultivated Volumnia making the character's ruthlessness all the more horrific. But he concluded that the cutting of much of the politics of the play had a real impact, as Coriolanus is "one of the most architecturally sound" of Shakespeare's works. Gordon P. Jones shared this view, arguing that the cutting made the play too introspective, coming across as Moshinsky's play rather than Shakespeare's, misrepresenting the entire play. The general effect of the cuts "is to diminish the human and stylistic range" of Coriolanus. Roger Warren, in Shakespeare Quarterly, recognised Moshinsky's deliberate interpretation of the play, and thought the production succeeded in its intimate approach, particularly with the "infatuation" that formed the relationship between Coriolanus and Aufidius, with both actors equal to the idea, and each other. Worth was "magnificent", the best he had ever seen in the role, with "richly musical deliver", while Warren felt that Howard consciously scaled down the "grandeur" of his earlier stage performance. He appreciated, too, the director's decision to use the mechanics of television to break up some scenes into smaller parts, making the play feel more natural to the medium.

Katherine Duncan-Jones, in the Times Literary Supplement, was uncertain. She found Ackland admirable and Worth "magnetic", and acknowledged Moshinsky's strong framing of his shots and his portrayal of the power games with the plebeians early in the play. The production had the virtues of the director's earlier Cymbeline but also the flaws. There was no atmosphere in the battle scenes, and too many dialogue scenes consisted of "peaceful, pictorially composed interiors". Howard was "seriously miscast" as Coriolanus, with "extraordinarily affected diction" that would never convince as a military leader. The production failed to "rise to real excitement", in large part because Howard had no rapport with Worth and the relationship with Aufidius, which seemed too ambiguous to be explicable, "never fully comes alive". Robert Ormsby writes that Moshinsky successfully creates violent spectacles in the battle scenes. But he takes exception to Moshinsky's uneven production, removing over 240 lines of dialogue in the first act, mostly from citizens and servants, and focusing his camera in the plebeian scenes mostly on the couple of lead citizens. When there are reaction shots of the citizens to Coriolanus's actions, they are often only somewhat visibly resentful. With many of the scenes reduced to smaller debates, the production loses its sense of the body politic, even giving the sense that "an ignoble cabal is operating against Coriolanus", without giving due blame to his own actions.

In the Guardian, Nancy Banks-Smith singled out McCallum for praise, as well as the production design, but regretted that the production opted for an "orthodox, classical" approach when it would have strongly suited a modern political interpretation. Howard's performance was too big for television, and the style and textual cutting "buried the play in a rather beautiful box". For Maurice Charney, there were some wonderful individual performances, and Gwilym made a wonderful contrast to Howard, but this was a "strikingly painterly and static" production where the pieces didn't add up to make "good critical sense" of the play. Howard was too old for the role, albeit "splendidly dismissive" and self-assured. Worth, although powerful, lacked "the hardness and ferocity for the role", with both Coriolanus and Volumnia too emotional in the final act. Charney also found the homoeroticism overdone, preferring it to be an undertone as intended in Shakespeare's text. He appreciated the beautifully stylised battle scenes, which showed how far the BBC series had come since its early days, but the mob scenes were too wooden, as if Moshinsky wasn't very interested.

Julian Barnes, in the Observer, found this a "splendid, snarling, rampant account" of the play with Howard "thrilling", having found the perfect role in Coriolanus. He disagreed with reviewers who thought the performance was too big for television, instead feeling that Howard adequately conveys how Coriolanus's "oppressive certainty and upstaging arrogance" are precisely too big for those around him, leading to the political instability. Barnes found that Moshinsky managed to keep viewer interest in a tough play, with Worth "operatic", Gwilym both tough and thoughtful, and McCallum turning a normally thankless part into "something fierce, watchful, and erotic". All of the design elements strongly cohered, with particular appreciation for the high-angle shots in some of the battle sequences.

=== Season 7 ===
==== The Life and Death of King John ====
- Directed by David Giles
- Produced by Shaun Sutton
- Designed by Chris Pemsel
- Taping dates: 1–7 February 1984
- First transmitted in the UK: 24 November 1984
- First transmitted in the US: 11 January 1985
- Running time (PAL DVD): 157 minutes

Cast

- Leonard Rossiter as King John
- William Whymper as Chatillon
- Mary Morris as Queen Elinor
- Robert Brown as Earl of Pembroke
- John Castle as Earl of Salisbury
- John Flint as Lord Bigot
- John Thaw as Hubert de Burgh
- George Costigan as Philip, the Bastard
- Edward Hibbert as Robert Faulconbridge
- Phyllida Law as Lady Faulconbridge
- Mike Lewin as James Gurney
- Charles Kay as King Philip of France
- Jonathan Coy as Lewis, the Dauphin
- Luc Owen as Arthur, Duke of Britaine
- Gorden Kaye as Lymoges, Duke of Austria
- Claire Bloom as Constance
- John Moreno as Melun
- Ian Barritt as French Herald
- Janet Maw as Blanche
- Carl Oatley as English Herald
- Clifford Parrish as Citizen of Angiers
- Richard Wordsworth as Cardinal Pandulph
- Ian Brimble as First Executioner
- Ronald Chenery as English Messenger
- Alan Collins as Peter of Pomfret
- Tim Brown as French Messenger
- Rusty Livingstone as Prince Henry

===== Behind the scenes =====
For this production, director David Giles chose to go with a stylised setting. He viewed the first three acts as "emblematic" and "heraldic", and stressed this through the bright blue set of Acts 2 and 3. Giles saw the last two acts as "more realistic", and as a result the colours are more muted. The music for the production was written by Colin Sell. Leonard Rossiter died in October 1984, the month before the production first aired.

The Prefaces to Shakespeare episode for The Life and Death of King John was presented by Emrys James who had played John in a 1974 RSC production directed by John Barton and Barry Kyle. The Shakespeare in Perspective episode was presented by the chairman of the British Railways Board Peter Parker.

===== Reception =====
In the Times Educational Supplement, Nicholas Shrimpton approved of the production even if it was dealing with Shakespeare "at his third best". Costigan came across as a spring-heeled jack, Bloom had "fierce energy and flawless technique", and Rossiter grew stronger as the production goes on to find a "grander and more majestic style" for the dying King. Joan Hanauer, in the Sun Sentinel praised Rossiter in particular as memorable. In the Guardian, Nancy Banks-Smith credited Rossiter with a "gloriously eccentric and really very human performance, making a funny, pitiful fellow creature out of a cypher". Peter Kemp, in the Times Literary Supplement, found Giles's production a "very credible" approach to a difficult text. Bloom was moving, Rossiter at his best in John's downfall, and Morris, with "poisonous aplomb" played Elinor as "a glittery-eyed, leathery-skinned old reptile". Costigan stood out in a "fresh, forceful performance" with "engaging verve and trenchancy".

In the Observer, Julian Barnes admired Rossiter's strong, accomplished performance, although concluded that Shakespeare's text has a shapeless plot and tedious events. As a result, Giles's cheap, "cardboard" production was not enough to make the play a success. For Dennis Hackett, in the London Times, Rossiter, Bloom, and Costigan all deserved plaudits but things were let down by the "insubstantial nature and limited mood of the sets". John J. O'Connor, in the New York Times, also agreed that the design was "singularly disappointing", aiming for stylisation but "the effect is merely chintzy". However Bloom and Morris in particular were compelling and Giles kept the action running smoothly, even though the production sounded better than it looked.

John Engstrom, writing for the Boston Globe, liked the lead performances and the visual contrast between the French and English courts, but concluded the play made "pretty tedious viewing". Scott Colley, in Shakespeare on Film Newsletter, admired Costigan, who was dignified as well as satirical, and Rossiter finding both "menace and desperation" in John. Particularly interesting was Coy, playing a Dauphin who had more sense of character growth and "a sense of self" than usually seen. Claire Bloom brought great subtlety to a role that could easily become melodramatic: "when Bloom is on camera, the set is not cramped and the stone walls do not so insistently resemble painted styrofoam". But the production was sometimes lifeless, feeling more like the BBC filling a gap in the canon than seeking to add new dimensions to the text. Where most of the recent productions in the series had a particular aesthetic, this was a visual disappointment. In the Christian Science Monitor, Christopher Swan was also unsatisfied by a surface-level production of a play that moral force and fascinating imagery. The reason the lesser-known plays often succeeded in the series was because they were "discovered" by the director, whereas Giles seemed to just set up a scene and then breeze through it. Rossiter was not at his best as King John and the two child princes struggled visibly with the language. However Bloom was exceptionally well-spoken as Constance, and Costigan stood out, speaking "as though fresh from Liverpool's pubs, yet [making] the anachronism work".

==== Pericles, Prince of Tyre ====
- Directed by David Jones
- Produced by Shaun Sutton
- Designed by Don Taylor
- Taping dates: 21–28 June 1983
- First transmitted in the UK: 8 December 1984
- First transmitted in the US: 11 June 1984
- Running time (PAL DVD): 177 minutes

Cast

- Edward Petherbridge as Gower
- John Woodvine as King Antiochus
- Edita Brychta as Antiochus's Daughter
- Mike Gwilym as Pericles
- Robert Ashby as Thaliard
- John Bardon as Lord of Tyre
- Peter Gordon as Lord of Tyre
- Iain Mitchell as Lord of Tyre
- Patrick Godfrey as Helicanus
- Toby Salaman as Escanes
- Norman Rodway as Cleon of Tarsus
- Annette Crosbie as Dionyza
- Christopher Saul as Lord of Tarsus
- Gordon Gostelow as Fisherman of Pentapolis
- John Bardon as Fisherman of Pentapolis
- Richard Derrington as Fisherman of Pentapolis
- Patrick Allen as King Simonides
- Juliet Stevenson as Thaisa
- Roger Bizley as Marshal
- Christopher Ravenscroft as Knight
- Malcolm Kaye as Knight
- Adam Kurakin as Knight
- Christopher Saul as Knight
- Robert Ashby as Knight
- Edward Clayton as Lord of Pentapolis
- Stephen Oxley as Lord of Pentapolis
- Valerie Lush as Lychorida
- John Bardon as Storm Sailor
- Malcolm Kaye as Storm Sailor
- Clive Swift as Lord Cerimon
- Edward Clayton as Philemon
- Christopher Ravenscroft as Gentleman of Ephesus
- Richard Derrington as Gentleman of Ephesus
- Stephen Oxley as Cermion's Servant
- Nick Brimble as Leonine
- Amanda Redman as Marina
- Roger Bizley as Pirate
- Peter Gordon as Pirate
- Iain Mitchell as Pirate
- Trevor Peacock as Boult
- Toby Salaman as Pandar
- Lila Kaye as Bawd
- Malcolm Kaye as Brothel Gentleman
- Adam Kurakin as Brothel Gentleman
- Patrick Ryecart as Lysimachus
- Frances Kelly as Marina's Companion
- Elayne Sharling as The Goddess Diana

===== Behind the scenes =====
Director David Jones used long shots in this episode to try to create the sense of a small person taking in a vast world. During rehearsal, Jones stressed to the actors that they should look for the simple narrative through-line rather than over-complicating the play by looking for the subtext, as actors usually would with Shakespeare. Jones felt that the style of the play meant that characters and situations would not stand up to that level of examination. For his design, Jones wanted the "feel" of the ancient Mediterranean but without capturing any particular historical or ethnic look in each of the lands which Pericles visits. The costumes were designed from North African and Arab styles. Jones and designer Don Taylor aimed to create a world where the sea was a constant theme but where the viewer would never explicitly see water. To tie the narrative together, Jones added the goddess Diana—who makes her appearance in the final act—to two previous sequences. Actress Elayne Sharling, as Diana, appears at the end of 1.4 comforting a starving famine victim, and again in 3.3 holding a dove, both times witnessing Pericles's acts of generosity.

Annette Crosbie thought of Dionyza as an early version of Alexis Colby, Joan Collins's character in Dynasty. Mike Gwilym viewed Pericles as "Candide on an Odyssey".

Jones assessed two "big holes" in the text which needed to be dealt with. The first was the brothel scene (4.6). Jones followed other directors, such as Terry Hands for the RSC, in taking material from George Wilkins's 1608 novel, The Painful Adventures of Pericles. Wilkins is the most common candidate for Shakespeare's collaborator on the play, and his novel is believed to be a "novelisation" to capitalise on the play's success, so has been used in numerous editions to clarify difficult parts of the play text, which scholars agree has serious textual issues due to the quality of the printing. Two pages of Wilkins's novel were translated to blank verse and added to the production, to explain why Lysimachus is at the brothel and make the scene where Marina wins him over more convincing. The second "big hole" was the stage direction "Marina sings" in 5.1, as the music and lyrics are not included in Shakespeare's text, but the music has significant theatrical importance as the moment Marina heals the depressed Pericles. Unable to find an appropriate song in the source texts, Jones asked the production's composer, Martin Best, to write new lyrics which followed the pattern of an original song from Lawrence Twine's 1576 prose novel, one of the sources for Shakespeare's play.

The Prefaces to Shakespeare episode for Pericles, Prince of Tyre was presented by Amanda Redman who portrayed Marina in the BBC adaptation. The Shakespeare in Perspective episode was presented by poet and journalist P. J. Kavanagh.

===== Reception =====
John Engstrom, in the Boston Globe, commended the "formal beauty" in Jones's shot compositions, shedding light on both character and situation. The pacing and structuring was "as gripping and moving as a raw documentary", leading Engstrom to declare this one of the strongest productions of the series. Julian Barnes, in the Observer, lauded Taylor's design and Jones's choice to play the text overall with a realistic approach, so that the moments of magic were "even more wondrous" when they appeared. The raising of Thaisa from the dead was "beautifully paced" and the reunion of Marina and Pericles was "as moving and shaking as anything" in the whole Shakespeare series. Gwilym created a character constantly in mental and physical action, which guarded against the written character's "essential passivity", and Redman was "heroic in the task of making virtue both forceful and interesting". Martin Best's "beguiling score" stood out: "the music of the spheres—on television". Barnes concluded the production was "sheer magic".

Peter Kemp, in the Times Literary Supplement, thought Jones "triumphantly met" the great challenge that the play poses for a director. Jones's production felt colourful and streamlined, with a wonderful score and sets. Allen and Stevenson stood out, alongside John Woodvine's "incisive menace". Retaining a sense of "high-coloured naturalism" made the production's emotions impactful, leading to a "haunting experience". Kemp concluded that this production helped to explain why the exciting play was so popular in its day. In the Guardian, Nancy Banks-Smith regretted that the production looked like no money had been spent on it, but admired Redman's strong performance and thought that the performance picked up in the later acts, i.e. the parts which Shakespeare is agreed to have written.

Writing for the New York Times, John J. O'Connor appreciated that Jones found smart ways for his characters to speak soliloquies to camera, and thought Gwilym was "immensely touching" as Pericles if somewhat physically slight for the role. But as a production, O'Connor found Pericles failed "to form a cohesive and convincing whole". Given the nature of the text, he felt it might require more directorial cutting and gimmicks. Roger Warren, in Shakespeare Quarterly, was impressed with the detailed, naturalistic sets, and appreciated Jones letting each location have its own distinctive atmosphere. Ryecart stood out in a "very subtle performance" as Lysimachus. However Warren found that the choice to enter into each part of the story without textual edits led to some longueurs in the earlier acts. Worse, Gwilym "lacked the wide vocal range needed" for the title role and "missed the sublime tenderness" needed for the reunion scene.

Joan Hartwig, in Shakespeare on Film Newsletter, rejected Jones's "insistent realism" which stood "at odds with the remoteness and fairy-tale world". It worked sometimes, as with the incest subplot that Shakespeare intended to be taken seriously. But much of the time the mixture of tragedy and comedy did not come through. Although Redman played Marina "sensitively and attractively', Gwilym's Pericles started off weak in contrast to King Antiochus and continued to seem like a victim throughout the play, looking "lost and unappealing", rather than commanding the audience's respect, when he washes up on shore in Pentapolis. Hartwig concluded that Gwilym took the part too seriously, and was not delicate enough in the reunion scene. In the same publication, Lewis Walker disagreed, concluded that almost everything works in the production, from the textual emendations to the music. By rendering many of the play's romantic elements more natural and personal, Jones created a "plausible, coherent production for a modern audience ... unifying a diverse and fragmentary plot".

==== Much Ado About Nothing ====
- Directed by Stuart Burge
- Produced by Shaun Sutton
- Directed by Jan Spoczynski
- Taping dates: 15–21 August 1984
- First transmitted in the UK: 22 December 1984
- First transmitted in the US: 30 November 1984
- Running time (PAL DVD): 148 minutes

Cast

- Lee Montague as Leonato
- Tim Faulkner as Messenger
- Cherie Lunghi as Beatrice
- Katharine Levy as Hero
- Jon Finch as Don Pedro
- Robert Lindsay as Benedick
- Robert Reynolds as Claudio
- Gordon Whiting as Antonio
- Vernon Dobtcheff as Don John
- Robert Gwilym as Conrade
- Tony Rohr as Borachio
- Pamela Moiseiwitsch as Margaret
- Ishia Bennison as Ursula
- Oz Clarke as Balthasar
- Ben Losh as Boy
- Michael Elphick as Dogberry
- Clive Dunn as Verges
- Gorden Kaye as First Watch
- Perry Benson as Second Watch
- Graham Crowden as Friar Francis
- John Kidd as Sexton

===== Behind the scenes =====
The inaugural episode of the entire series was originally set to be a production of Much Ado About Nothing, directed by Donald McWhinnie, and starring Penelope Keith and Michael York. The episode was shot (for £250,000), edited and publicly announced as the opening of the series, before it was pulled from the schedule and replaced with Romeo & Juliet, originally intended as the second episode. No reasons were given by the BBC for this decision. Initial newspaper reports suggested that the episode had been postponed for reshoots, due to an unspecified actor's "very heavy accent," and concerns that US audiences would not be able to understand the dialogue. However, no reshoots materialised, and internal evidence at the BBC suggests management simply regarded the production as a failure..

The play was finally adapted in the final season. Director Stuart Burge considered shooting the entire episode against a blank tapestry background, with no set whatsoever, but it was felt that audiences would not respond well to this. Ultimately the production used "stylized realism"; the environments are suggestive of their real-life counterparts, the foregrounds are broadly realistic representations, but the backgrounds tended to be more artificial; "a representational context close to the actors, with a more stylized presentation of distance." Burge took his design inspiration from 16th and 17th century Sicily, so designer Jan Spoczynski could also incorporate Turkish and Moorish influences. The costumes were inspired by early Elizabethan designs, as there are specific references to the clothing styles and items in the text. Costume designer June Hudson used Elizabethan patterns held in the Victoria and Albert Museum. Hudson chose animals as the inspiration for the masks at the Act 1 party, to contrast with the human skulls later scene in Hero's crypt.

Burge cast Beatrice and Benedick younger than they were typically seen in British stage productions at the time. He felt the play should be about young love. Beatrice, in Burge's view, is "much the strongest character" in the play and should be "sexually attractive, tremendously independent". She stands out not because she is an older, unmarried lady but because her independence separates her from the traditional romantic desires of the men. Composer Simon Rogers based his music on 16th century Italian folk songs.

The Prefaces to Shakespeare episode for Much Ado About Nothing was presented by Kenneth Haigh who had played Benedick in a 1976 Royal Exchange Theatre production directed by Braham Murray. The Shakespeare in Perspective episode was presented by actress Eleanor Bron.

===== Reception =====
In the Washington Post, David Richards regarded this as "a handsome, thoughtful ... sober interpretation of a comedy" that wisely avoided "flashy effects". Lindsay and Lunghi were an "uncommonly attractive" Beatrice and Benedick, allowing their respective self-doubts to show. Dobtcheff and Elphick were particularly strong among the supporting cast. Peter Kemp, in the Times Literary Supplement, considered this a "rich production" with "gorgeous sets" that brought the Sicilian setting to the fore. Lunghi and Lindsay gave "psychologically astute performances" that did justice to their characters. Dobtcheff did a wonderful job infusing "what might seem like an extinct piece of dramatic fauna—the saturnine Machiavellian—with creepy life". Hugh Hebert, in the Guardian, agreed that this was "very creditable and handsomely presented". Burge had chosen to make his Much Ado "darker and more realistic" than most contemporary theatre productions, and the outcome was "none the worse for that".

By contrast, in the New York Times, John J. O'Connor was disappointed in an "almost relentlessly pedestrian" production that exhibited "the kind of lifelessness that sometimes afflicts repertory companies in the hinterlands"". He generally enjoyed Dobtcheff and Elphick, and Lindsay and Lunghi were spirited enough, while Rogers's music was nicely arranged. But the remainder of the cast presented as if they didn't have time to rehearse. Finch was "inadequate", playing the role of Don Pedro too arch, and Reynolds came across "childish and inexperienced". The use of too many reaction shots of frozen faces made the comedy feel awkward and the design was "cluttered and heavy-handed", especially the grand staircase. In Shakespeare on Film Newsletter, Susan McCloskey appreciated that the set and lighting designers captured both the "sunlit comedy" of Beatrice and Benedick and the "tragic darkening" of Claudio and Hero's plot. But Burge as director treated them as two separate genres, never allowing them to mix and contrast as intended by Shakespeare. Lindsay was too prickly as Benedick while Lunghi's Beatrice was rarely merry despite characters noting that she was. In the "uncertain first half" the actors often defied "the sense of their lines", and Dogberry's scenes were mostly interminable. It was disappointing to see a lack of physical comedy even in the scenes where Benedick and then Beatrice are tricked. However Burge exhibited an ability to create three dimensions on screen, at his strongest with the camera in group scenes like the party and the wedding, which was a particular highlight, capturing the varied reactions. The exterior designs created a strong sense of physical space. After the wedding, the production became stronger, and Beatrice and Benedick were "radiant" in the later scenes. McCloskey wished Burge had harmonised the comic and tragic parts, rather than having "split the difference".

==== Love's Labour's Lost ====
- Directed by Elijah Moshinsky
- Produced by Shaun Sutton
- Designed by Barbara Gosnold
- Taping dates: 30 June-6 July 1984
- First transmitted in the UK: 5 January 1985
- First transmitted in the US: 31 May 1985
- Running time (PAL DVD): 120 minutes

Cast

- Jonathan Kent as The King of Navarre
- Christopher Blake as Longaville
- Geoffrey Burridge as Dumain
- Mike Gwilym as Berowne
- David Warner as Don Armado
- John Kane as Moth
- Paul Jesson as Costard
- Frank Williams as Dull
- Paddy Navin as Jaquenetta
- Clifford Rose as Boyet
- Maureen Lipman as The Princess of France
- Katy Behean as Maria
- Petra Markham as Katharine
- Jenny Agutter as Rosaline
- Jay Ruparelia as Adrian
- John Burgess as Sir Nathaniel
- John Wells as Holofernes
- Valentine Dyall as Marcade
- Linda Kitchen as Spring
- Susanna Ross as Winter

===== Behind the scenes =====
The Princess of France and her party await the arrival of the King of Navarre. The influence of fête galante is evident in everything from the blocking of the characters, to the costumes, to the hairstyles, to the background.

This is the only play of the series to be set in the eighteenth century. Director Elijah Moshinsky took as inspiration the paintings of Jean-Antoine Watteau, especially his use of fête galante in pictures such as L'Embarquement pour Cythère, the music of Wolfgang Amadeus Mozart and the writing of Pierre de Marivaux. Of the play, Moshinsky said, "it has the atmosphere of Marivaux – which is rather delicious, and yet full of formalised rules between men and women, sense against sensibility; there's a distinction between enlightenment and feeling. I think the atmosphere of Watteau's paintings suits this enormously well and gives it a lightness of touch. And also it abstracts it; we don't want anything too realistic because the whole thing is a kind of mathematical equation – four men for four women – and the play is testing certain propositions about love." To capture the fête galante style, Moshinsky had lighting technician John Summers use footlights (as opposed to the usual method of ceiling lighting) for the exterior scenes involving the Princess and her ladies. He also shot sequences through a very light gauze to create a softness in line and colour.

For Moshinsky, the central episode of the production is the play-within-the-play in the final scene which is interrupted by the arrival of Marcade with bad news, a moment to which Moshinsky refers as "an astonishing sleight of hand about reality and the reflection of experiencing reality." He argues that the audience is so wrapped up in watching the characters watch the pageant that they have forgotten reality. The arrival of Marcade with news of the death of the King of France jolts the audience back to reality in the same way it jolts the eight main characters. In this sense, Moshinsky sees the play more as about artifice and reality than romantic relationships. In rehearsal, the character of Holofernes had a cat, on which he doted, which was designed to make the character more sympathetic. But the cat proved too distracting for the performers and crew, and the only cats available were black, which got lost on camera against Holofernes's black coat, so the animal was dismissed.

This was one of two productions which replaced original dialogue with material from outside the play (the other was Anthony & Cleopatra). Here, in an invented scene set between Act 2 Scene 1 and Act 3, Scene 1, Berowne is shown drafting the poem to Rosaline, which will later be read by Nathaniel to Jacquenetta. The lines in this invented scene (delivered in voice-over) are taken from the fifth poem of the William Jaggard publication The Passionate Pilgrim, a variant of Berowne's final version of his own poem.

The character of Moth is referred to on multiple occasions as "boy". In 19th century and early 20th century productions, the role was always played by an adult, although it is possible Shakespeare's original production used a child actor. Tyrone Guthrie, in 1936, introduced the modern idea of casting a child in the role, although productions throughout the 20th century often cast a young female adult instead. Moshinsky decided that the use of the word "boy" was an eccentricity on the part of the character of Don Armado, and cast John Kane (aged 38 at time of filming). The series' literary advisor, John Wilders, strongly disagreed. This was the only production that Wilders criticised publicly, feeling that it ruined the comedy of a child being wiser than his master.

The Prefaces to Shakespeare episode for Love's Labour's Lost was presented by Kenneth Branagh who had played Navarre in a 1984 RSC production directed by Barry Kyle. The Shakespeare in Perspective episode was presented by novelist Emma Tennant.

===== Reception =====
Dan Sullivan, in the Los Angeles Times, accepted that it is hard—but not impossible—to bring the language of this play alive. But Moshinsky's production "isn't particular entertaining, isn't particularly scholarly, and wouldn't turn anyone on to Shakespeare". It was a mistake to make Moth an adult and ruin the joke, while using numerous cuts during the love-letter sequence deflated the comedy of the four men overhearing one another. The audience didn't get to see the men's entrance disguised as Muscovites, so there's no sense to capture what is always a funny entrance on stage. Although well-spoken and witty, Moshinsky's play was "teacup Shakespeare: words-words-words, with very little sense of the people to whom they are attached". In the Boston Globe, Ed Siegel compared this negatively to a contemporary production of the play by the American Repertory Theatre. The ART updated the play to 1936 and opened up possibilities, whereas Moshinsky's production seemed stuck in quicksand, closing down possibilities instead with its "static direction and harsh declamation that seems totally foreign to television".

In Shakespeare on Film Newsletter, Frances Teague admired Moshinsky's pleasing design and found the actors' diction impeccable, but sadly the production was dull. Characterisations were all wrong: Agutter was too sullen, Wells too arrogant, and casting Kane as Moth made all of the jokes about the character meaningless. The pacing was too fast and the setting conveyed a dusty atmosphere so the audience "lost sight of Shakespeare's quicksilver comedy". Teague was unhappy about rearranging speeches and scenes, feeling that Moshinsky was talking down to the audience by cross-cutting scenes and assuming that audiences couldn't connect storylines unless the camera explicitly did so. Ultimately, quoting William Blake, Teague concluded that "tastefulness is an enemy to art".

In the New York Times, John J. O'Connor thought that the production fell into the category of "good-but-not-great middle range" within the series, although much of the problem was down to Shakespeare's "elusively precious" text. Moshinsky's conception worked best in the sombre closing scene of the play, when some depth of character shone through. Peter Kemp, in the Times Literary Supplement, was disappointed. The play is already difficult enough with most of its jokes expired, and what was most interesting about it was simply its place in the development of Shakespeare's career. The play was out of place in the 18th century, and Kemp was disappointed that the design wasn't original, since Peter Brook had used a similar design at the Royal Shakespeare Company forty years earlier, in 1946. Only Lipman stood out as an actor, while the decision to fill the play with "a Watteau-like mellowness" merely "travestied" the work by gilding something that would look prettier if it were more simplistic. The final scene with the songs of Spring and Winter, which should have a refreshingly simple zest, "gets titivated into a pseudo-Mozartian sequence of self-conscious operatic trills and cadenza fanciness".

Megan Rosenfield, in the Washington Post, found Warner and Wells "gloriously funny" in the subplot but concluded that the eight lovers were vacant characters in the text and the production did little to change that. Moshinsky's design choice "swamps whatever irony or poignance might be brought out [with] archness and artificiality".

==== Titus Andronicus ====
- Directed by Jane Howell
- Produced by Shaun Sutton
- Designed by Tony Burrough
- Taping dates: 10–17 February 1985
- First transmitted in the UK: 27 April 1985
- First transmitted in the US: 19 April 1985
- Running time (PAL DVD): 167 minutes

Cast

- Paul Davies Prowles as Young Lucius
- Edward Hardwicke as Marcus
- Walter Brown as Aemilius
- Brian Protheroe as Saturninus
- Nicholas Gecks as Bassianus
- Derek Fuke as Captain/3rd Goth/Sempronius
- Eileen Atkins as Tamora
- Peter Searles as Alarbus/4th Goth/Valentine
- Neil McCaul as Demetrius
- Michael Crompton as Chiron
- Hugh Quarshie as Aaron
- Gavin Richards as Lucius
- Crispin Redman as Quintus
- Tom Hunsinger as Martius
- Michael Packer as Mutius
- Trevor Peacock as Titus
- Anna Calder-Marshall as Lavinia
- Paul Kelly as Publius/2nd Goth
- John Benfield as Messenger/1st Goth/Caius
- Deddie Davies as Nurse
- Tim Potter as Clown

===== Behind the scenes =====
Young Lucius stares at the body of Aaron's baby, with his father in the background, out of focus, being inaugurated as the new emperor.

Director Jane Howell was given a choice of all the remaining plays in the final season, and chose Titus because it "seemed impossible" and thus a challenge. Howell was interested in setting the play in a modern setting such as contemporary Northern Ireland, to explore the political resonances of the play. Unable to do this under the series' mandate, she settled on a more conventional approach. Trevor Peacock was cast first and, as he was of average height, the other actors were cast to complement his stature. Howell had the Roman populace all wear identical generic masks without mouths, so as to convey the idea that the Roman people were faceless and voiceless, as she felt the play depicted a society which "seemed like a society where everyone was faceless except for those in power." In the opening scene, as the former emperor's body is carried out, only Saturninus and Bassianus take their masks away from their faces, and they do so only to glare at one another.

All the body parts seen throughout were based upon real autopsy photographs and were authenticated by the Royal College of Surgeons. The costumes of the Goths were based on punk outfits, with Chiron and Demetrius specifically based on the band Kiss. For the scene when Chiron and Demetrius are killed, a large carcass is seen hanging nearby; this was a genuine lamb carcass purchased from a kosher butcher and smeared with Vaseline to make it gleam under the studio lighting.

Howell set Young Lucius as the centre of the production so as to prompt the question "What are we doing to the children?" At the end of the play, as Lucius delivers his final speech, the camera stays on Young Lucius rather than his father, who is in the far background and out of focus, as he stares in horror at the coffin of Aaron's child. (Although in most productions the baby survives, the text is ambiguous.) Thus the production became "in part about a boy's reaction to murder and mutilation. We see him losing his innocence and being drawn into this adventure of revenge; yet, at the end we perceive that he retains the capacity for compassion and sympathy." Howell chose to rearrange the first scene, opening with the entrance of Titus (1.1.64) and the sacrifice of Alarbus, and then introducing Bassanius and Saturninus. The benefit of this was to introduce the audience first to the title character before the potential confusion of the busy and long first scene.

The production rehearsed in January and February 1984, and was intended to be shot in February/March, earlier in the seventh season. However a BBC strike impacted the studio dates. When the strike ended, there were no studio slots available until later in the year, by which point Peacock had a scheduling clash due to his commitment to the Royal Shakespeare Company. Taping finally took place in February 1985, a year later than planned. The delay meant the recasting of some supporting roles, including Demetrius, Quintus, young Lucius, and the Clown. The taping schedule still had to work around Peacock, who was performing some nights in a repertory season of Mother Courage and Her Children for the RSC.

The Prefaces to Shakespeare episode for Titus Andronicus was presented by Patrick Stewart who had played Titus in a 1981 RSC production directed by John Barton. The Shakespeare in Perspective episode was presented by psychiatrist Anthony Clare.

===== Reception =====
John J. O'Connor, writing for the New York Times, praised Howell's solid cast and the device of young Lucius as observer. Quarshie in particular stood out, "silkily smooth and abrasively horrifying as the complex Aaron". The production was likely to linger in the memory. David Bianculli, in the Philadelphia Inquirer', was impressed overall. He noted Calder-Marshall and Atkins as "spellbindingly good", the former truly chilling and the latter both sexy and sinister. In the Observer, Julian Barnes was entertained but not consistently. There was fun to be had in the production, and Peacock played the later scenes with "rugged relish". But Barnes considered the play an apprentice work for Shakespeare, where any audience had to take the bad with the good.

Stanley Wells, in the Times Literary Supplement, considered the use of Young Lucius "brilliant": "his grave compassion reflects and directs our response". Calder-Marshall was particularly touching as the ravished Lavinia, and Howell's choices to amend or modernise the text were almost invariably successful, such as a clear passing of time between the murders and the banquet, which added "dignity and plausibility to the closing passages". But Wells found that the handling of grief and horror in the play wasn't always successful. Howell's camera, for the "tableaux of grief", lingered too much on the person wounded or dead, rather than on the person speaking, where the dialogue should drive our emotional response. As Marcus, Hardwicke failed to command the verse in his significant speech, and the play's rhetoric seemed to prove too much of a challenge for television. While Peacock began well as the gravelly-voiced warrior, his voice did "not realise the emotion latent in his anguished arias" and he made no attempt to seem mad—truly or feigned—in the final act.

David Richards, in the Washington Post, found the director did not conquer the challenges of this text. Howell made the work pretentious by accident, by trying "to ennoble the material". It was bald horror, and became "inadvertently entertaining". In the London Times, Sean French found the production "Dull ... a blankly-lit studio set and some over-theatrical performances all apparently designed for export and schools".

== Awards ==
Award	Year	Category	Recipients	Production	Notes	Result	Ref.
British Academy Television Awards	1980	Best Actress	Kate Nelligan	Measure for Measure		Nominated	
British Academy Television Awards	1981	Best Television Cameraman	Geoff Feld	The Merchant of Venice	also for The Fatal Spring and We, The Accused	Won	
British Academy Television Awards	1981	Best Lighting	John Treays	The Taming of the Shrew		Nominated	
British Academy Television Awards	1981	Best Lighting	Dennis Channon	The Merchant of Venice		Nominated	
British Academy Television Awards	1981	Best Graphics	Alan Jeapes	The Merchant of Venice		Nominated	
British Academy Television Awards	1981	Best Original Music	Carl Davis	The Merchant of Venice	also for Fair Stood The Wind For France, Love Story, Oppenheimer, Hollywood, The Misanthrope, The Sailor's Return, and The Old Curiosity Shop	Won	
British Academy Television Awards	1982	Best Television Cameraman	Jim Atkinson	All's Well That Ends Well, Othello, Timon of Athens and Troilus and Cressida		Won	
British Academy Television Awards	1983	Best Sound Supervisor	Richard Chubb	The Merchant of Venice	also for Frost In May, Tishoo, Another Flip for Dominick, Season of Alan Bennett Plays, and La Ronde	Nominated	
British Academy Television Awards	1984	Best Lighting	Chris White	King Lear		Nominated	
British Academy Television Awards	1984	Best VTR Editor	Peter Reason	The Comedy of Errors and The Two Gentlemen of Verona		Nominated	
British Academy Television Awards	1984	Best VTR Editor	Stan Pow	Macbeth	also for Mansfield Park	Nominated	
British Academy Television Awards	1984	Best Original Music	Carl Davis	Macbeth	also for The Aerodrome, The Spice Of Life, The Tale Of Beatrix Potter, and Unknown Chaplin	Nominated	
Royal Television Society Programme Awards	1985	Designer of the Year	Jan Spoczynski	Much Ado About Nothing	also for A Month in the Country	Won	
Royal Television Society Programme Awards	1985	Judges Award	Shaun Sutton	The BBC Shakespeare plays		Won	

== See also ==
- An Age of Kings (1960)
- The Spread of the Eagle (1963)
- The Wars of the Roses (1963; 1965)
- Shakespeare: The Animated Tales (1992–1994)
- ShakespeaRe-Told (2005)
- The Hollow Crown (2012; 2016)
