= Julius Caesar (1970 film) =

1970 Shakespearean film by Stuart Burge

- US film poster
- Directed by: Stuart Burge
- Written by: Robert Furnival
- Based on: Julius Caesar; 1599 play by William Shakespeare
- Produced by: Peter Snell
- Starring: Charlton Heston; Jason Robards; John Gielgud; Richard Johnson; Robert Vaughn; Richard Chamberlain; Diana Rigg; Christopher Lee; Jill Bennett
- Cinematography: Kenneth Higgins
- Edited by: Eric Boyd-Perkins
- Music by: Michael J. Lewis
- Production company: Commonwealth United
- Distributed by: Commonwealth United (UK); American International Pictures (US)
- Release dates: 20 February 1970 (Tokyo premiere); 4 June 1970 (UK); 3 February 1971 (US)
- Running time: 116 minutes
- Countries: United Kingdom; United States
- Language: English

Julius Caesar is a 1970 film adaptation of William Shakespeare's play of the same name, directed by Stuart Burge. It stars Charlton Heston as Mark Antony, Jason Robards as Brutus, Richard Johnson as Cassius, John Gielgud as Caesar, Robert Vaughn as Casca, Richard Chamberlain as Octavius, and Diana Rigg as Portia. It was an independent production of Commonwealth United Entertainment, filmed in England and Spain. It is the first film version of the play made in colour.

== Cast ==
- Charlton Heston as Mark Antony
- Jason Robards as Brutus
- John Gielgud as Julius Caesar
- Richard Johnson as Cassius
- Robert Vaughn as Casca
- Richard Chamberlain as Octavius
- Diana Rigg as Portia
- Christopher Lee as Artemidorus
- Jill Bennett as Calpurnia
- André Morell as Cicero
- Derek Godfrey as Decius Brutus
- David Dodimead as Lepidus
- Michael Gough as Metellus Cimber
- David Neal as Cinna
- Preston Lockwood as Trebonius
- John Moffatt as Popilius Lena
- Steven Pacey as Lucius
- Edwin Finn as Publius
- Norman Bowler as Titinius
- Paul Hardwick as Messala
- John Tate as Clitus
- Damien Thomas as Pindarus
- Bob Keegan as Lucilius
- Ewan Hooper as Strato
- Andrew Crawford as Volumnius
- Thomas Heathcote as Flavius
- Alan Browning as Marullus
- Christopher Cazenove as a Servant to Antony
- Liz Gebhardt as Calpurnia's Maid
- Laurence Harrington as a Carpenter
- Ron Pember as a Cobbler
- Roy Stewart as a Slave
- Michael Keating, David Leland, Yvette Rees, Michael Wynne and Ken Hutchison as Citizens of Rome

== Production ==
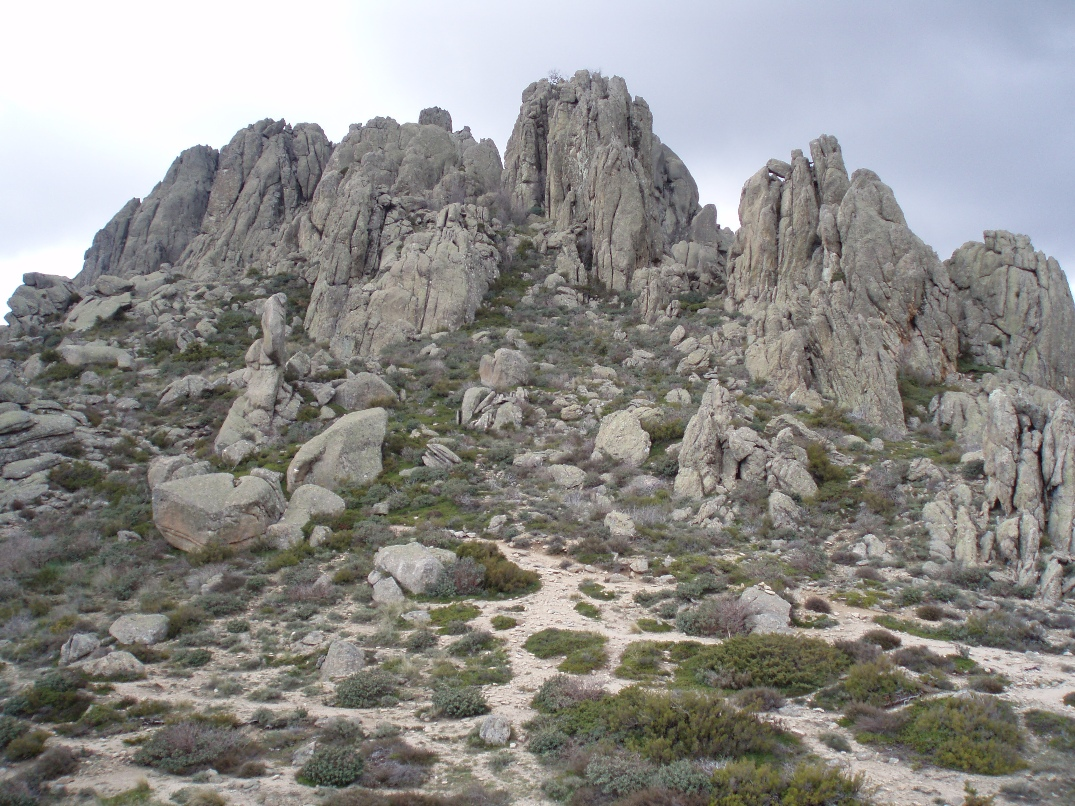
La Pedriza in Madrid, one of the film's locations

The film was shot primarily at MGM-British Studios and Pinewood Studios in England. The battle sequences were filmed on-location in Manzanares el Real, Spain.

=== Casting ===
Orson Welles was the first choice to portray Brutus, but was passed over for Jason Robards, who had considerable difficulties during production: frequently missing rehearsals, refusing to appear on horseback, and holding up the proceedings due to illness.

John Gielgud and Charlton Heston had both appeared in previous film adaptations of Shakespeare's play; Gielgud played Cassius in the 1953 film directed by Joseph L. Mankiewicz, and Heston also played Mark Antony in a low-budget 1950 version. He would do so a third time, in a 1972 film version of Shakespeare's Antony and Cleopatra, also produced by Peter Snell and directed by Heston.

Peter Eyre is credited as playing Cinna the poet, but his role was cut from the final film. Max Adrian was cast in a featured role, but dropped out before filming.

Richard Johnson worked several times with Heston.

== Release ==
Julius Caesar had its world premiere in Tokyo on 20 February 1970 and was released in the UK on 4 June 1970. The film failed at the box office.

== Reception ==
=== Critical response ===
The reviews for this version upon its theatrical release were mostly negative, with Robards especially being criticised for his wooden performance as Brutus.

Howard Thompson wrote in his review:

"Ye gods! Must I endure all this?" understandably bellows Cassius (Richard Johnson) in the last lap of the third filming of William Shakespeare's Julius Caesar, which opened yesterday at the Kips Bay Theater. Made in England and Spain and in color, with a perfectly viable cast headed by Jason Robards and Charlton Heston, the new picture is generally as flat and juiceless as a dead haddock. In this third go-round, Willie and Julius, both, really get the business. It's Shakespeare all right, at least in dialogue. Dramaturgically, the blueprint adheres to the Hollywood version back in 1953. That solid, intelligent treatment may have lacked majesty but it did have two fire-and-ice performances by John Gielgud as Cassius and Marlon Brando as Mark Antony. And the tormented soul of the real hero, Brutus (James Mason), was sufficiently and touchingly bared. Then there was an even earlier Julius Caesar from Chicago, of all places, with a newcomer named Charlton Heston as Antony, which he repeats here. The movie did have a raw, shoestring vigor and a bit more. The new movie moves sluggishly, as directed by Stuart Burge. As the center of the whole thing, Robards is incredibly dull and wooden as Brutus, the "noblest Roman of them all." Heston supplies laconic bite and delivers a good, ferocious funeral oration. For all his professionalism, Gielgud's Caesar is just an old shrewdie who yields to his ego. In Sir John's former Cassius slot, Johnson looks anything but "lean and hungry," with a bearded sneer, contrasting Robert Vaughn's bland, eye-rolling Casca. However, Diana Rigg and Richard Chamberlain, as Portia and Octavius Caesar, are briefly excellent in their quicksilver precision and feeling. But it's hopeless. Now Julius Caesar looks left out all night.

Critic Roger Ebert gave it only one star. In his review, he wrote:

There's hardly any way to describe how Jason Robards brings Julius Caesar to its knees, but let me try. It's a neat trick. He stares vacantly into the camera and recites Shakespeare's words as if he'd memorized them seconds before, or maybe was reading from idiot cards. Each word has the same emphasis as the last, and they march out of the screen at us without regard for phrases, sentences or emotional content. We begin to suspect, along toward Robards' big speech over Caesar's body, that Robards' mind has been captured by a computer from another planet and that the movie is an alien plot to drain the soul from mighty Shakespeare. Robards would be enough, all by himself, to capsize the movie, but there's more. The actors race about on sets so flimsy we half expect them to collapse and sweep the entire Senate away with Caesar. When the crowds gather for Mark Antony's funeral oration, they group themselves like refugees from a particularly orderly Renaissance painting. When we get close-ups of the conspirators, they're arranged like mannequins in a department store window, and so rigid is the staging that sometimes they actually have to talk over their shoulders to each other. And then there's the matter of the walla. In big crowd scenes, sound departments always put in a lot of walla. Crudely defined, walla is the mix of indistinguishable noises a crowd makes when it talks all at once: Walla, walla, walla. Now walla isn't expensive — mere cents per wal — but in Julius Caesar something very weird has happened to the walla. It sounds as if it were composed on a synthetic electronic device of some sort; it doesn't sound human. So there's poor Robards trying to remember his lines, and all this synthetic walla curling around him, and then Charlton Heston leaps in with his Mark Antony speech. Heston does a fine job. Indeed, several performances are good; especially Robert Vaughn's as a slippery Casca. But just when Heston gets into high gear, we cut away to a long shot of the crowd and lose all the personal emotion in Heston's face.

Charlton Heston later expressed dissatisfaction with the film, which had been a passion project, claiming it had a poor director, an unsuitable cameraman, and the wrong actor as Brutus. He called Jason Robards's performance "the worst performance by a really good actor."

== Home media ==
The film was released on DVD on 11 May 2004 initially and then 1 February 2005, 25 July 2006, and 19 February 2013 afterwards. Upon its 2013 Blu-ray disc release, it met with a more positive review from the website DVD Talk, although Jason Robards' performance was still soundly panned. Its previous DVD release, which was pan-and-scanned rather than letterboxed, had been harshly criticised, and several other DVD reviewers also disparaged the film.

== See also ==
- List of historical films
- List of films set in ancient Rome
- Julius Caesar (1953 film)
