= Julius Caesar (1953 film) =

1953 film by Joseph L. Mankiewicz

- Theatrical release poster
- Directed by: Joseph L. Mankiewicz
- Screenplay by: Joseph L. Mankiewicz
- Based on: Julius Caesar play by William Shakespeare
- Produced by: John Houseman
- Starring: Marlon Brando; James Mason; John Gielgud; Louis Calhern; Edmond O'Brien; Greer Garson; Deborah Kerr
- Cinematography: Joseph Ruttenberg
- Edited by: John Dunning
- Music by: Miklós Rózsa
- Production company: Metro-Goldwyn-Mayer
- Distributed by: Loew's, Inc.
- Release date: June 3, 1953
- Running time: 121 minutes
- Country: United States
- Language: English
- Budget: $2 million
- Box office: $3.9 million

Julius Caesar (billed on-screen as William Shakespeare's Julius Caesar) is a 1953 American film adaptation of William Shakespeare's play Julius Caesar, directed by Joseph L. Mankiewicz and produced by John Houseman for Metro-Goldwyn-Mayer. It stars Marlon Brando as Mark Antony, James Mason as Brutus, John Gielgud as Cassius, Louis Calhern as Julius Caesar, Edmond O'Brien as Casca, Greer Garson as Calpurnia, and Deborah Kerr as Portia.

It opened to positive reviews, and was nominated in five categories at the 26th Academy Awards (including Best Picture and Best Actor for Brando), winning Best Art Direction – Black-and-White. Brando and Gielgud both won BAFTA Awards, Brando for Best Foreign Actor and Gielgud for Best British Actor.

== Plot ==
Upon Caesar's return to Rome, after defeating Pompey in the civil war, his countrymen chose him a fourth time consul and then dictator for life. . . thus he became odious to moderate men through the extravagance of the titles and powers that were heaped upon him.

— Plutarch's Lives

"Rome - - 44 B.C." It is a largely-faithful adaptation of Shakespeare's play, with no significant cuts or alterations to the original text. The only notable exception is the Messenger's text recounting the Battle of Philippi, which is substituted with a visual depiction of the battle.

== Cast ==
- Marlon Brando as Mark Antony
- James Mason as Brutus
- John Gielgud as Cassius
- Louis Calhern as Julius Caesar
- Edmond O'Brien as Casca
- Greer Garson as Calpurnia
- Deborah Kerr as Portia
- George Macready as Marullus
- Michael Pate as Flavius
- Richard Hale as a Soothsayer
- Alan Napier as Cicero
- John Hoyt as Decius Brutus
- Tom Powers as Metellus Cimber
- William Cottrell as Cinna
- Jack Raine as Trebonius
- Ian Wolfe as Ligarius
- Morgan Farley as Artemidorus
- Bill Phipps as Servant to Antony
- Douglas Watson as Octavius Caesar
- Douglass Dumbrille as Lepidus
- Rhys Williams as Lucilius
- Michael Ansara as Pindarus
- Dayton Lummis as Messala
- Edmund Purdom as Strato
- Paul Guilfoyle as First Citizen
- John Doucette as Second Citizen
- Lawrence Dobkin as Third Citizen
- Jo Gilbert as Fourth Citizen

and Senators, Citizens and Soldiers of Rome

=== Cast as listed in end credits ===
Dramatis personae

in the order of their appearance

- John Doucette … a Carpenter
- George Macready .. Marullus
- Michael Pate ….. Flavius
- Louis Calhern . Julius Caesar
- Edmond O'Brien …… Casca
- Greer Garson …. Calpurnia
- Deborah Kerr …… Portia
- Marlon Brando . Mark Antony
- James Mason …… Brutus
- John Gielgud ……. Cassius
- Richard Hale … a Soothsayer
- Alan Napier ……. Cicero
- William Cottrell …. Cinna
- John Hardy …….. Lucius
- John Hoyt … Decius Brutus
- Tom Powers . Metellus Cimber
- Jack Raine …… Trebonius
- Ian Wolfe …….. Ligarius
- Chester Stratton . Servant to Caesar
- Lumsden Hare …… Publius
- Morgan Farley … Artemidorus
- Victor Perry … Popilius Lena
- Bill Phipps .. Servant to Antony
- Michael Tolan . Officer to Octavius
- Douglas Watson . Octavius Caesar
- Douglass Dumbrille … Lepidus
- Rhys Williams ….. Lucilius
- Michael Ansara …. Pindarus
- Dayton Lummis ….. Messala
- John Lupton ……. Varro
- Preston Hanson … Claudius
- John Parrish ….. Titinius
- Joe Waring …….. Clitus
- Stephen Roberts .. Dardanius
- Thomas Browne Henry . Volumnius
- Edmund Purdom …. Strato

and as citizens of Rome

- Paul Guilfoyle; • Lawrence Dobkin
- David Bond • Jo Gilbert • Ann Tyrrell
- John O'Malley • Oliver Blake
- Alvin Hurwitz • Donald Elson

== Production ==
John Houseman says the film was made because Laurence Olivier's 1944 production of Henry V had been a success. MGM's head of production, Dore Schary, offered the project to Houseman, who said he wanted Joseph L. Mankiewicz to direct because he thought he and William Wyler were "probably the two best dialogue directors in the business" and that Mankiewicz was "younger and more flexible."

Houseman did not want to use an all-British cast. "I'd done a lot of Shakespeare in America," he said. "If it was going to be cast all-English, it should be an English picture, made in England and we might as well forget about it."

Houseman says MGM wanted to make the film in color but he and Mankiewicz refused, "partly because we wanted people to relate to the newsreels, to the fascist movements in Europe, which were still relevant" and also because they would be "using a lot of the Quo Vadis sets, and it seemed idiotic to invite comparison with Quo Vadis."

Though Houseman originally intended to shoot the film in Italy, production ultimately took place in Los Angeles. Many of the sets and costumes were repurposed from 1951's Quo Vadis, with several setpieces deconstructed, flown from Rome to California, and rebuilt on MGM's Culver City studio backlot. One historian has noted that, in the scenes set at Brutus's house, a bust of Emperor Hadrian — who was not born for another 120 years – gazes down at the proceedings.

Houseman says they "decided to do it as a small production, not a spectacle; to do it for what it really is—the drama of a political power play."

== Casting ==
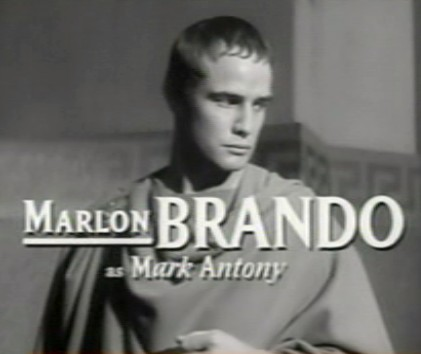
Marlon Brando in the film's trailer.

Many actors in this film had experience in the play. John Gielgud had played Mark Antony at the Old Vic Theatre in 1930 and Cassius at the Shakespeare Memorial Theatre in Stratford-upon-Avon in 1950, James Mason had played Brutus at the Abbey Theatre in Dublin in the 1940s, and John Hoyt, who plays Decius Brutus, also played him in the Mercury Theatre's 1937 stage version. Gielgud later played the title role in the 1970 film with Charlton Heston, Jason Robards and Richard Johnson (as Cassius) and in a stage production directed by John Schlesinger at the Royal National Theatre. John Houseman, who had produced the famous 1937 Broadway version of the play starring Orson Welles and the Mercury Theatre, also produced the MGM film. By this time, however, Welles and Houseman had had a falling out, and Welles had nothing to do with the 1953 film. P. M. Pasinetti, an Italian writer, scholar, and teacher at the University of California, Los Angeles, served as a technical advisor.

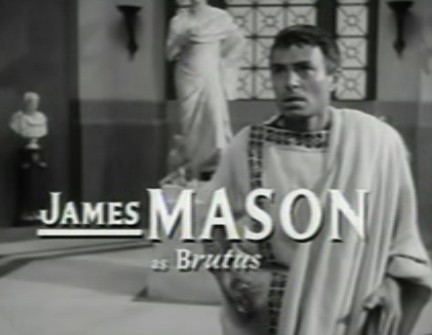
James Mason in the film's trailer.

Brando's casting was met with some skepticism when it was announced, as he had acquired the nickname of "The Mumbler" following his performance in A Streetcar Named Desire (1951). The director, Joseph L. Mankiewicz, even considered Paul Scofield for the role of Mark Antony if Brando's screen test was unsuccessful. Brando asked John Gielgud for advice in declaiming Shakespeare, and adopted all of Gielgud's recommendations. Brando's performance turned out so well that the New York Times' Bosley Crowther stated in his review of the film: “Happily, Mr. Brando's diction, which has been guttural and slurred in previous films, is clear and precise in this instance. In him a major talent has emerged.” Brando was so dedicated in his performance during shooting that Gielgud offered to direct him in the London stage production of Hamlet, a proposition that Brando seriously considered but ultimately turned down. During filming, James Mason became concerned that Brando was stealing the audience's sympathy away from him and his character, Brutus, so Mason appealed to Mankiewicz, with whom he had bonded earlier while making the film 5 Fingers, requesting that the director stop Brando from dominating the film and "put the focus back where it belongs. Namely on me!" The subsequent shift in directorial attention didn't escape Brando, who threatened to walk off the film if Mankiewicz "threw one more scene to Mason", alleging a ménage à trois among Mankiewicz, Mason and his wife Pamela Mason. Despite the feuding, production continued with only minimal disruption, thanks to what Gielgud called, "Mankiewicz's consummate tact that kept us together as a working unit."

== Release ==
It premiered at the Booth Theatre in New York City on June 3, 1953.

== Reception ==
=== Critical response ===
It received highly favorable reviews. Bosley Crowther of The New York Times called it "a stirring and memorable film," while Variety wrote: "A triumphant achievement in film-making, it will be rated one of the great pictures of Hollywood." Harrison's Reports raved, "Excellent! Sumptuously produced, expertly directed and brilliantly acted, 'Julius Caesar' is an artistic triumph that ranks with the best of the Shakespearean plays that have been put on film." John McCarten of The New Yorker called the film "a very chilly exercise" and opined that Brando "plainly shows he needs a bit of speech training before he can graduate into an acting league where the spoken word is a trifle more significant than the flexed biceps and the fixed eye," but praised Mason and Gielgud as "a pleasure to watch and listen to." The Monthly Film Bulletin called it "an excellent film, excellent cinema, excellent entertainment, and pretty respectable art."

In the second volume of his book The Story of Cinema, David Shipman pointed to Gielgud "negotiating the verse as in no other Shakespeare film to date except Olivier's". On Rotten Tomatoes the film has an approval rating of 97% based on reviews from 68 critics.

The film is recognized by American Film Institute in these lists:

- 2008: AFI's 10 Top 10:
  - Nominated Epic Film

=== Box office ===
According to MGM records, the film earned $2,021,000 in the U.S. and Canada and $1,899,000 in other markets, resulting in a profit of $116,000.

In 1976, Houseman said "It's still shown a lot—in theaters and schools and on TV. I suspect it finally made more money than any other picture I made."

== Awards and nominations ==
The film won the Academy Award for Best Art Direction (Cedric Gibbons, Edward Carfagno, Edwin B. Willis, Hugh Hunt), and was nominated for Best Actor in a Leading Role (Marlon Brando), Best Cinematography, Black-and-White, Best Music, Scoring of a Dramatic or Comedy Picture and Best Picture. Brando's nomination was his third consecutive for Best Actor, following 1951's A Streetcar Named Desire and 1952's Viva Zapata!. He would win the following year for On the Waterfront.

Julius Caesar won BAFTA Awards for Best British Actor (John Gielgud) and Best Foreign Actor (Marlon Brando), and was also nominated for Best Film. It was Brando's second of three consecutive BAFTA Best Actor awards, for Viva Zapata! (1952), Julius Caesar (1953), and On the Waterfront (1954).

The National Board of Review awarded Julius Caesar Best Film and Best Actor (James Mason), and it also won the Golden Leopard at the Locarno International Film Festival.

== Soundtrack ==
Intrada Records released an album featuring a 1995 re-recording of Miklos Rozsa’s film score. The re-recording was performed by the Sinfonia of London and conducted by Bruce Broughton.

Intrada Album
No.	Title	Length
1.	"Julius Caesar Overture"	3:15
2.	"Praeludium"	3:38
3.	"Caesar's Procession"	2:45
4.	"Flavius Arrested"	0:18
5.	"Feast of Lupercal"	0:44
6.	"Caesar and His Train"	0:51
7.	"The Scolding Winds"	2:42
8.	"Brutus' Soliloquy"	6:34
9.	"Brutus' Secret"	2:11
10.	"They Murder Caesar"	1:08
11.	"The Ides of March"	4:36
12.	"Black Sentence"	3:55
13.	"Brutus' Camp"	1:31
14.	"Heavy Eyes"	1:47
15.	"Gentle Knave"	2:07
16.	"Ghost of Caesar"	1:42
17.	"Most Noble Brutus"	1:10
18.	"Battle at Philippi"	1:28
19.	"Titinius Enclosed"	0:40
20.	"Caesar Now Be Still!"	8:54
21.	"Finale"	1:10

== See also ==
- List of historical drama films
- List of films set in ancient Rome
- Julius Caesar (1950 film)
- Julius Caesar (1970 film)
