= Epidia gens =

Ancient Roman family

The gens Epidia was an obscure plebeian family at ancient Rome. The only members to achieve any importance lived during the first century BC.

== Origin ==
According to Suetonius, The orator Epidius claimed to have been descended from a rural deity known as Epidius Nuncionus, although this name may reflect a corruption in the text of Suetonius. Apparently the god was worshiped along the banks of the Sarnus.

== Members ==
- Epidius, a Latin rhetorician of the first century BC, who taught both Mark Antony and Octavian. He was convicted of calumnia.
- Gaius Epidius Marullus, tribune of the plebs in 44 BC, and his colleague, Lucius Caesetius Flavus, offended Caesar by removing a diadem that had been placed upon his statue, and charging those who had saluted Caesar as king. At Caesar's urging, the tribune Gaius Helvius Cinna arranged for Epidius to be deprived of his office, and expelled from the Senate.

== See also ==
- List of Roman gentes

== Bibliography ==
- Marcus Tullius Cicero, Philippicae.
- Marcus Velleius Paterculus, Roman History.
- Gaius Suetonius Tranquillus, De Claris Rhetoribus (On the Eminent Orators); De Vita Caesarum (Lives of the Caesars, or The Twelve Caesars).
- Lucius Mestrius Plutarchus (Plutarch), Lives of the Noble Greeks and Romans.
- Appianus Alexandrinus (Appian), Bellum Civile (The Civil War).
- Lucius Cassius Dio Cocceianus (Cassius Dio), Roman History.
- Dictionary of Greek and Roman Biography and Mythology, William Smith, ed., Little, Brown and Company, Boston (1849).
