= Caesetia gens =

Minor plebeian family of ancient Rome

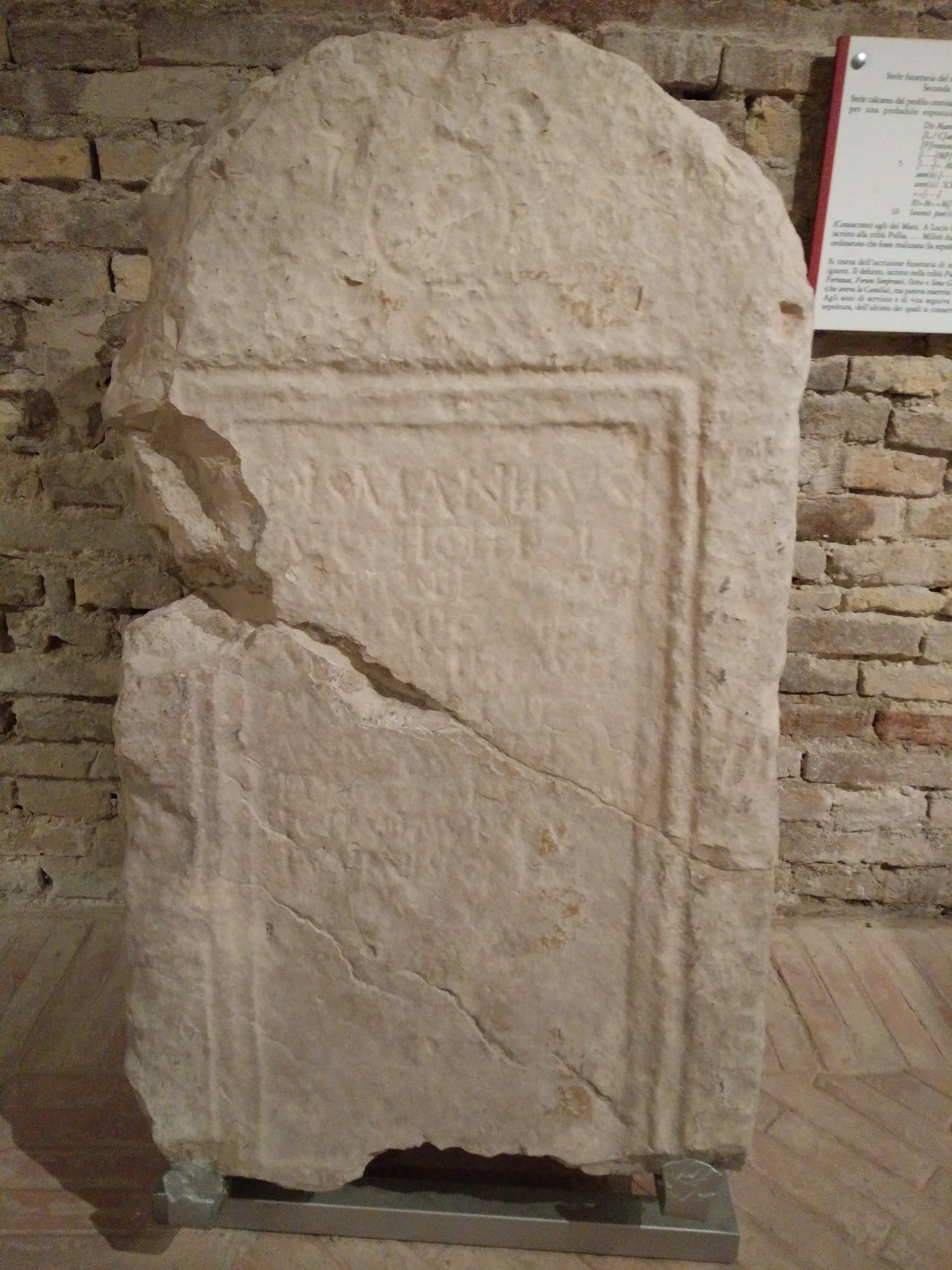
Monument of Lucius Caesetius Fronto

The gens Caesetia was a minor plebeian family of ancient Rome. It is known from a small number of individuals who lived during the late Republic.

== Members ==
- Publius Caesetius, the quaestor of Verres.
- Gaius Caesetius, an eques who sought the aid of Caesar to pardon Quintus Ligarius.
- Lucius Caesetius Flavus, tribune of the plebs in 44 BC, was deprived of his office after earning the enmity of Caesar through his actions. Flavus, along with Lucius Epidius Marullus, had ordered the removal of crowns from Caesar's statues, and imprisoned a man who had saluted the dictator as rex. Caesar expelled them from the senate, but Flavus became quite popular as a result of his steadfastness. The tribune "Flavius" in Shakespeare's play Julius Caesar is based on him.
- Caesetius Rufus, the owner of a house coveted by Fulvia, the wife of Mark Antony, by whom he was proscribed in 43 BC. Supposedly, his death was the result of little more than Fulvia's greed.

== See also ==
- List of Roman gentes

== Bibliography ==
- Marcus Tullius Cicero, In Verrem, Philippicae, Pro Ligario.
- Titus Livius (Livy), History of Rome (Epitome).
- Marcus Velleius Paterculus, Roman History.
- Valerius Maximus, Factorum ac Dictorum Memorabilium (Memorable Facts and Sayings).
- Lucius Mestrius Plutarchus (Plutarch), Lives of the Noble Greeks and Romans.
- Gaius Suetonius Tranquillus, De Vita Caesarum (Lives of the Caesars, or The Twelve Caesars).
- Appianus Alexandrinus (Appian), Bellum Civile (The Civil War).
- Lucius Cassius Dio Cocceianus (Cassius Dio), Roman History.
- Dictionary of Greek and Roman Biography and Mythology, William Smith, ed., Little, Brown and Company, Boston (1849).
