= Julius Caesar (play) =

Play by William Shakespeare

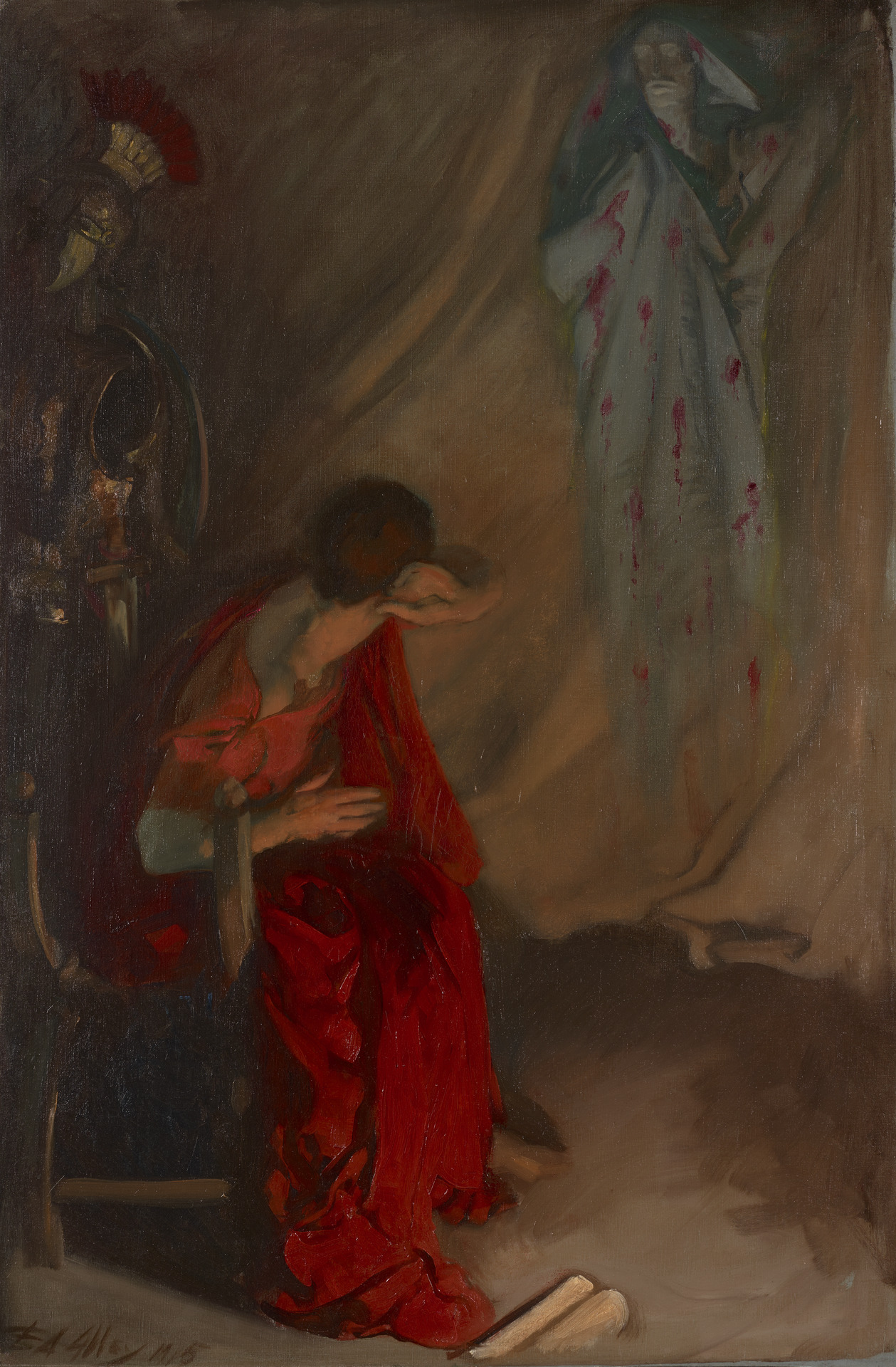
Within the Tent of Brutus: Enter the Ghost of Caesar, Julius Caesar, Act IV, Scene III, by Edwin Austin Abbey, 1905

The Tragedy of Julius Caesar, (Note: Spelled The Tragedie of Ivlivs Cæsar in the First Folio.) often shortened to Julius Caesar, is a historical tragedy by William Shakespeare, believed to have been written and first performed in 1599. The play portrays the political conspiracy that led to the assassination of the Roman dictator Julius Caesar and Rome's subsequent civil war. Drawing primarily (with deviations in various aspects) from Sir Thomas North's 1579 translation of Parallel Lives by Plutarch, Shakespeare presents a dramatised account of Caesar's growing power, his murder by a group of senators led by Cassius and Brutus, and the defeat of the conspirators by the forces of Mark Antony and Octavius at the Battle of Philippi.

Although named after Caesar, the play focuses largely on Brutus, whose moral and political dilemmas have often led critics to regard him as its tragic hero. Central themes include the tension between personal loyalty and public duty, the use of rhetoric in politics, and the fragility of republican governance in the face of ambition and power. Julius Caesar was among the first plays performed at the Globe Theatre and has remained one of Shakespeare's most frequently staged works. It has been adapted in numerous forms and interpreted in diverse political contexts, reflecting concerns from Elizabethan debates on succession to modern discussions of dictatorship and democracy. The play is widely studied for its exploration of character, persuasion, and political morality, and it continues to influence literature, theater, and political discourse.

== Synopsis ==
The play opens with the two tribunes Flavius and Marullus (appointed leaders/officials of Rome) discovering the commoners of Rome celebrating Julius Caesar's triumphant return from defeating the sons of his military rival, Pompey. The tribunes, insulting the crowd for their change in loyalty from Pompey to Caesar, attempt to end the festivities and break up the commoners, who return the insults. During the feast of Lupercal, Caesar holds a victory parade and a soothsayer warns him to "Beware the ides of March," which he ignores. Meanwhile, Cassius attempts to convince Brutus to join his conspiracy to kill Caesar. Although Brutus, friendly towards Caesar, is hesitant to kill him, he agrees that Caesar may be abusing his power. They then hear from Casca that Mark Antony has offered Caesar the crown of Rome three times. Casca tells them that each time Caesar refused it with increasing reluctance, hoping that the crowd watching would insist that he accept the crown. He describes how the crowd applauded Caesar for denying the crown, and how this upset Caesar. On the eve of the ides of March, the conspirators meet and reveal that they have forged letters of support from the Roman people to tempt Brutus into joining. Brutus reads the letters and, after much moral debate, decides to join the conspiracy, thinking that Caesar should be killed to prevent him from doing anything against the people of Rome if he were ever to be crowned.

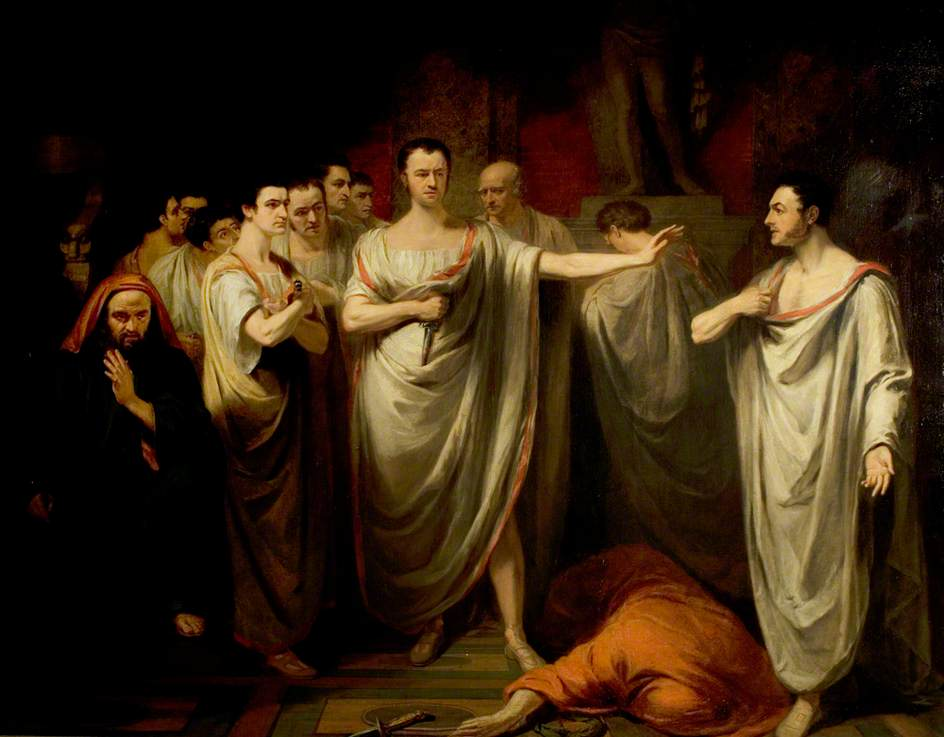
"Julius Caesar", Act III, Scene 2, the Murder Scene, George Clint (1822)

After ignoring the soothsayer, as well as his wife Calpurnia's own premonitions, Caesar goes to the Senate. The conspirators approach him with a fake petition pleading on behalf of Metellus Cimber's banished brother. As Caesar predictably rejects the petition, Casca and the others suddenly stab him; Brutus is last. At this, Caesar asks "Et tu, Brute?" ("You too, Brutus?"), concluding with "Then fall, Caesar!"

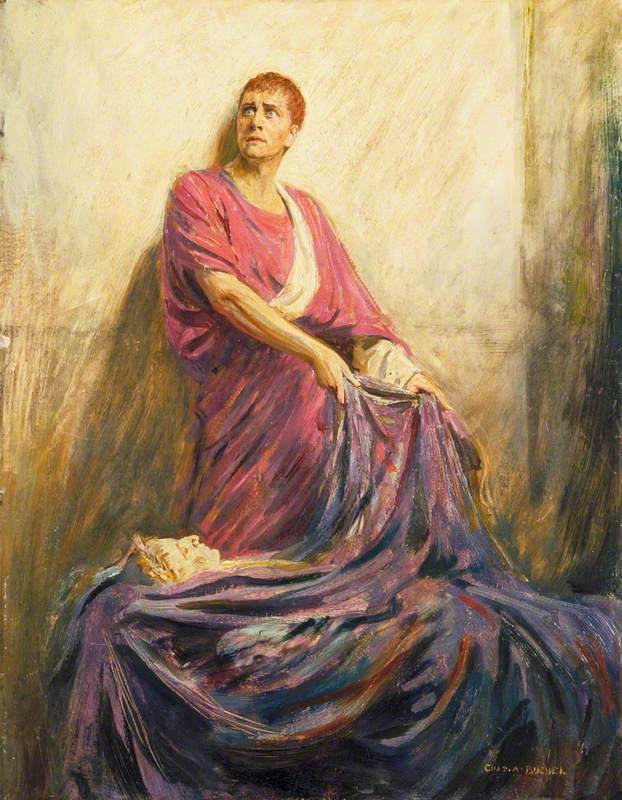
Herbert Beerbohm Tree (1852–1917), as Mark Anthony in 'Julius Caesar' by William Shakespeare, Charles A. Buchel (1914)

The conspirators attempt to demonstrate that they killed Caesar for the good of Rome, to prevent an autocrat. They prove this by not attempting to flee the scene. Brutus delivers an oration defending his actions, and for the moment, the crowd is on his side. However, Antony makes a subtle and eloquent speech over Caesar's corpse, beginning "Friends, Romans, countrymen, lend me your ears!" He deftly turns public opinion against the assassins by manipulating the emotions of the common people, in contrast to the rational tone of Brutus's speech, yet there is a method in his rhetorical speech and gestures. Antony reminds the crowd of the good Caesar had done for Rome, his sympathy with the poor, and his refusal of the crown at the Lupercal, thus questioning Brutus's claim of Caesar's ambition; he shows Caesar's bloody, lifeless body to the crowd to have them shed tears and gain sympathy for their fallen hero; and he reads Caesar's will, in which every Roman citizen would receive 75 drachmas. Antony, even as he states his intentions against it, rouses the mob to drive the conspirators from Rome. The mob takes Caesar's body to the Forum, lights his funeral pyre, and uses the pyre to light up torches for burning down the homes of the conspirators. Amid the violence, an innocent poet, Cinna, is confused with the conspirator Lucius Cinna and is taken by the mob, which kills him for such "offences" as his bad verses.

Brutus and Cassius argue over Brutus' accusation that Cassius has soiled the noble act of regicide by having accepted bribes. ("Did not great Julius bleed for justice' sake? / What villain touched his body, that did stab, / And not for justice?") The two are reconciled after Brutus reveals that his beloved wife committed suicide under the stress of his absence from Rome. They prepare for a civil war against Antony, Caesar's adopted son Octavius, and Lepidus who have formed a triumvirate in Rome. That night, Caesar's ghost appears to Brutus with a warning of defeat. (He informs Brutus, "Thou shalt see me at Philippi.")

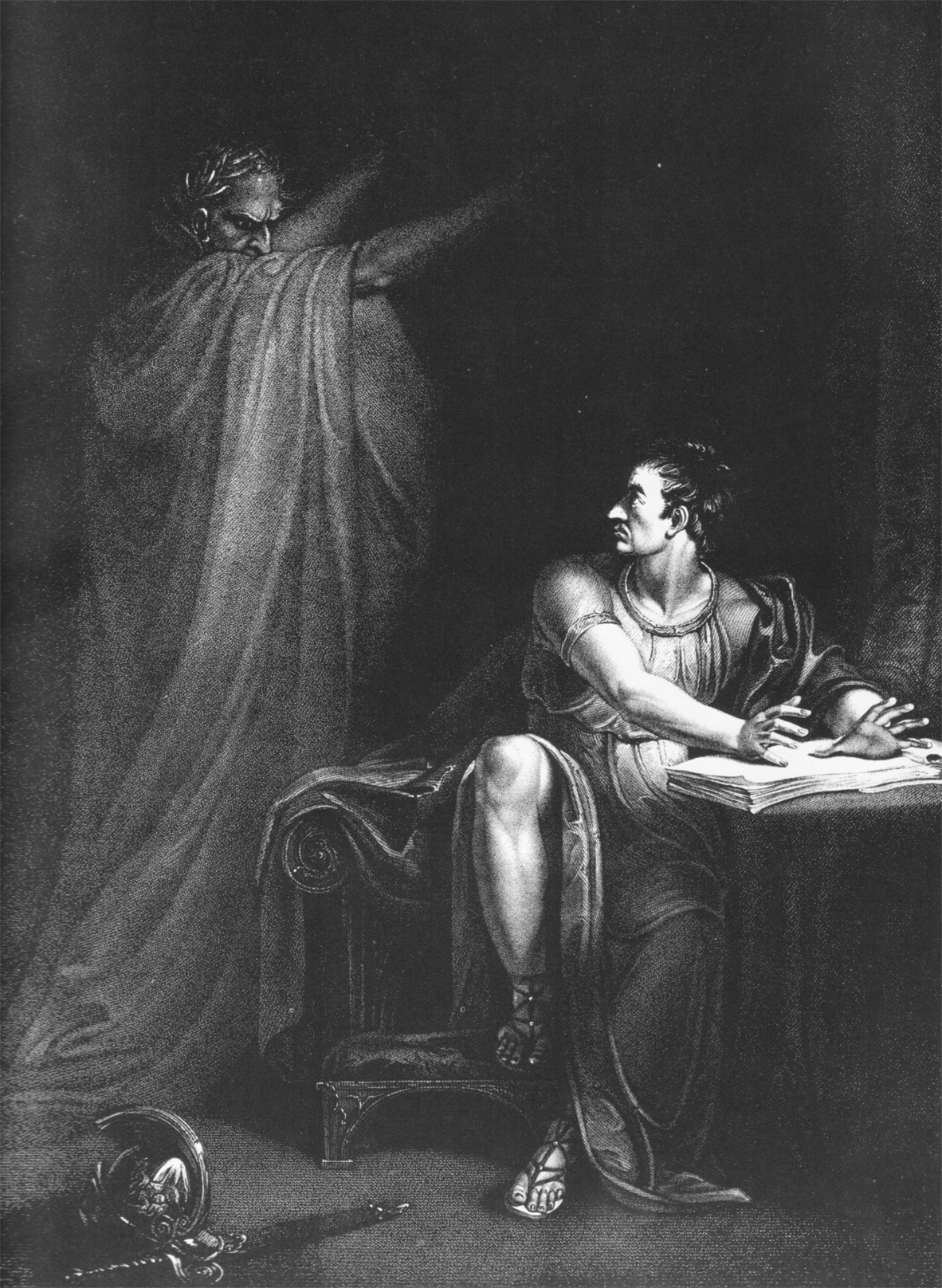
The ghost of Caesar taunts Brutus about his imminent defeat. (Copperplate engraving by Edward Scriven from a painting by Richard Westall: London, 1802.)

At the Battle of Philippi, Cassius and Brutus, knowing that they will probably both die, smile their last smiles to each other and hold hands. During the battle, Cassius has his servant kill him after hearing of the capture of his best friend, Titinius. After Titinius, who was not captured, sees Cassius's corpse, he commits suicide. However, Brutus wins that stage of the battle, but his victory is not conclusive. With a heavy heart, Brutus battles again the next day. He asks his friends to kill him, but the friends refuse. He loses and commits suicide by running on his sword, held for him by a loyal soldier.

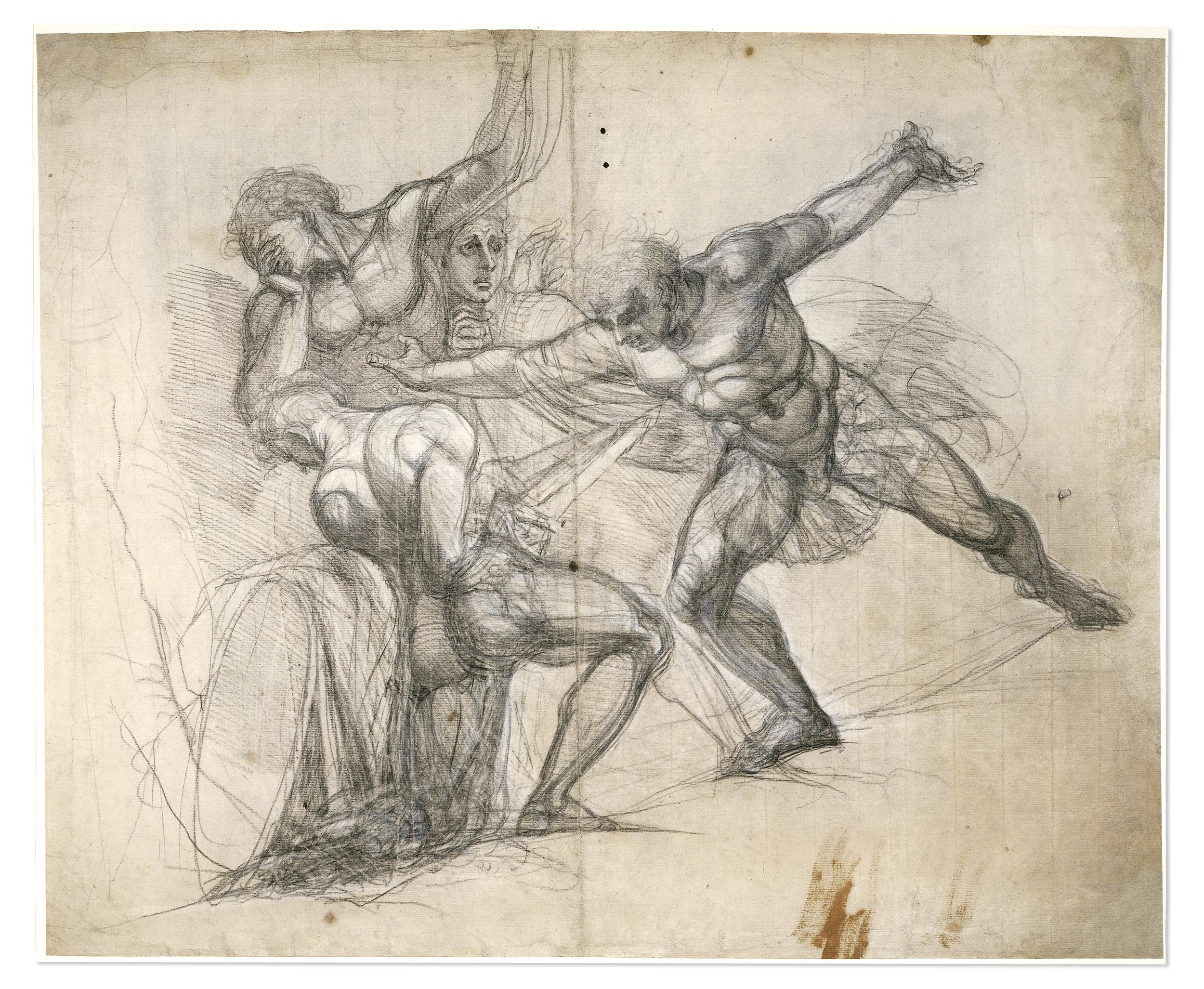
Henry Fuseli, The Death of Brutus, a charcoal drawing with white chalk (c. 1785)

The play ends with a tribute to Brutus by Antony, who proclaims that Brutus has remained "the noblest Roman of them all" because he was the only conspirator who acted, in his mind, for the good of Rome. There is then a small hint at the friction between Antony and Octavius which characterizes another of Shakespeare's Roman plays, Antony and Cleopatra.

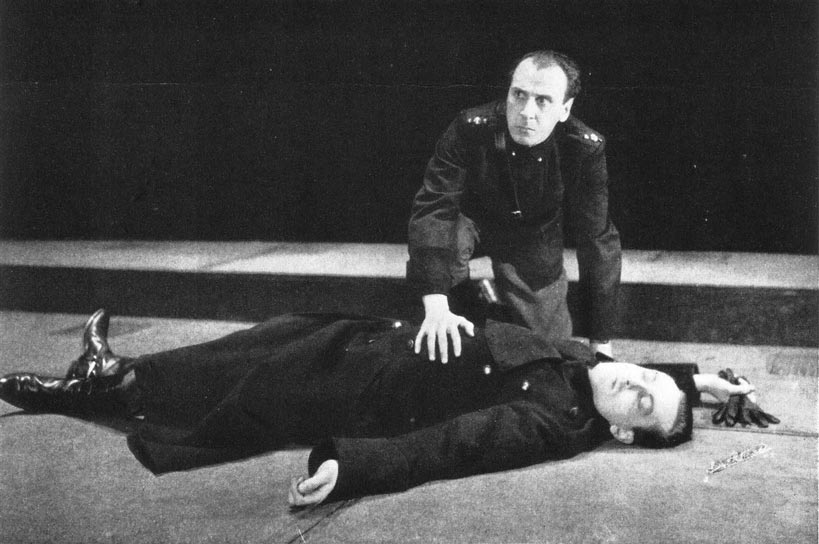
Antony (George Coulouris) kneels over the body of Brutus (Orson Welles) at the conclusion of the Mercury Theatre production of Caesar (1937–38).

== Characters ==
- Julius Caesar

Triumvirs after Caesar's death

- Octavius Caesar
- Mark Antony
- Lepidus

Conspirators against Caesar

- Marcus Junius Brutus (Brutus)
- Caius Cassius
- Casca
- Decius Brutus
- Cinna
- Metellus Cimber
- Trebonius
- Caius Ligarius

Tribunes

- Flavius
- Marullus

Roman Senate Senators

- Cicero
- Publius
- Popilius Lena

Citizens

- Calpurnia – Caesar's wife
- Portia – Brutus' wife
- Soothsayer – a person supposed to be able to foresee the future
- Artemidorus – sophist from Knidos
- Cinna – poet
- Cobbler
- Carpenter
- Poet (believed to be based on Marcus Favonius)
- Lucius – Brutus' attendant

Loyal to Brutus and Cassius

- Volumnius
- Titinius
- Young Cato – Portia's brother
- Messala – messenger
- Varrus
- Clitus
- Claudio
- Dardanius
- Strato
- Lucilius
- Flavius (non-speaking role)
- Labeo (non-speaking role)
- Pindarus – Cassius' bondman

Other

- Caesar's servant
- Antony's servant
- Octavius' servant
- Messenger
- Other soldiers, senators, plebeians, and attendants

== Sources ==
The main source of the play is Thomas North's translation of Plutarch's Lives.

=== Deviations from Plutarch ===
- Shakespeare places Caesar's triumph on the day of Lupercalia (15 February), when in reality, he triumphed over Pompey six months earlier.
- For dramatic effect, he makes Capitoline Hill the venue of Caesar's death rather than the Curia Pompeia (Curia of Pompey).
- Caesar's murder, the funeral, Antony's oration, the reading of the will, and the arrival of Octavius all take place on the same day in the play. However, historically, the assassination took place on 15 March (The Ides of March), the will was published on 18 March, the funeral was on 20 March, and Octavius arrived only in May.
- Shakespeare makes the Triumvirs meet in Rome instead of near Bononia to avoid an additional locale.
- He combines the two Battles of Philippi although there was a 20-day interval between them.
- Shakespeare has Caesar remark Et tu, Brute? ("And you, Brutus?") before he dies. Plutarch and Suetonius each reported that Caesar said nothing, with Plutarch adding that he pulled his toga over his head when he saw Brutus among the conspirators, though Suetonius does record other reports that Caesar said "ista quidem vis est" ("This is violence"). The Latin words Et tu, Brute?, however, were not devised by Shakespeare for this play since they are attributed to Caesar in earlier Elizabethan works and had become conventional by 1599.

Shakespeare deviated from these historical facts to curtail time and compress the facts so that the play could be staged more easily. The tragic force is condensed into a few scenes for heightened effect.

== Date and text ==
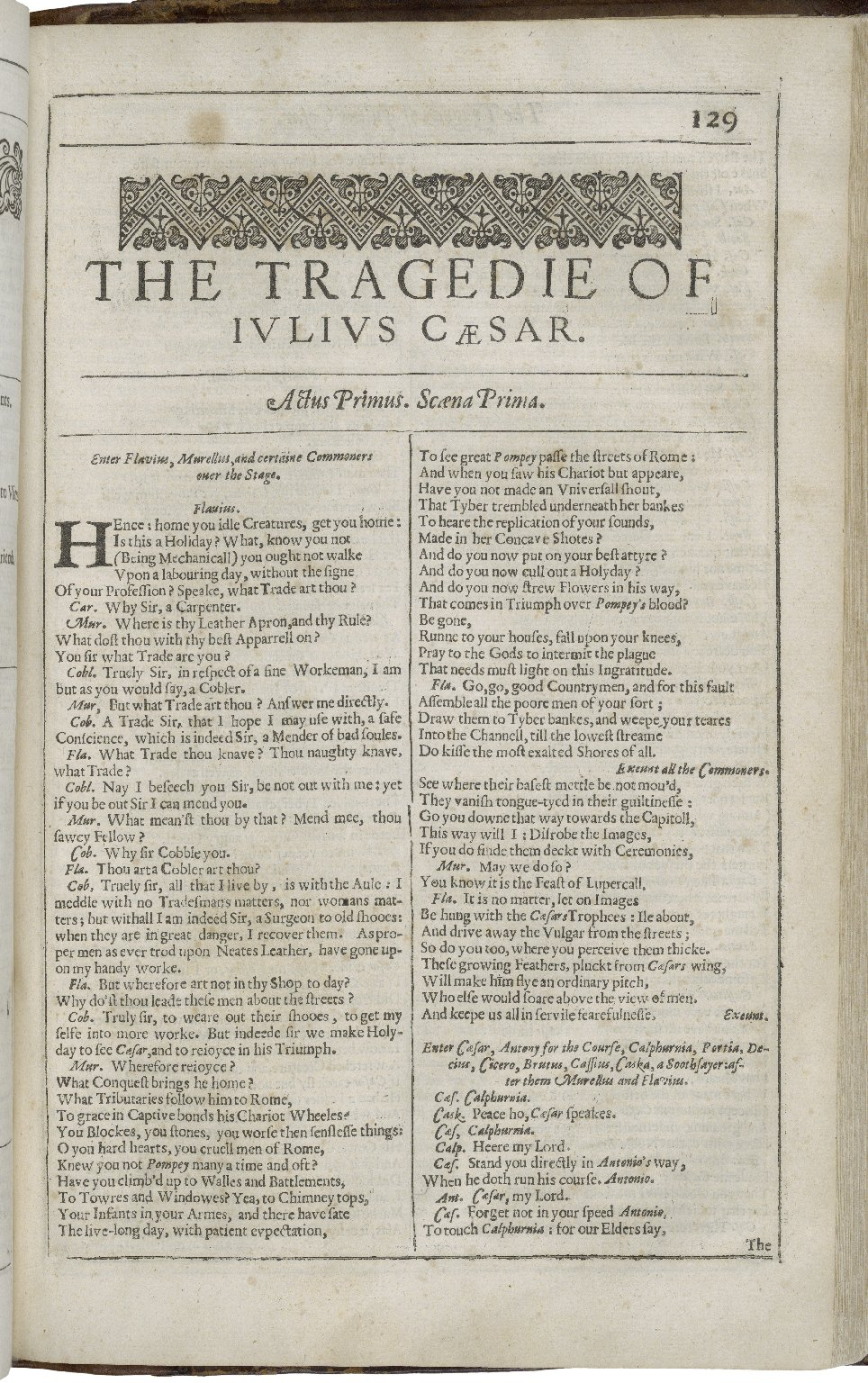
The first page of Julius Caesar, printed in the Second Folio of 1632

Julius Caesar was originally published in the First Folio of 1623. The Swiss traveller Thomas Platter the Younger mentioned seeing in London "the tragedy of the first emperor Julius Caesar" in his diary on 21 September 1599. Although it is possible that the play Platter saw was not Shakespeare's, most of the evidence suggests that it was. The play is not mentioned in the list of Shakespeare's plays published by Francis Meres in 1598. Based on these two points, as well as several contemporary allusions, and the belief that the play is similar to Hamlet in vocabulary, and to Henry V and As You Like It in metre, scholars have suggested 1599 as a probable date.

The text of Julius Caesar in the First Folio is the only authoritative text for the play. The Folio text is notable for its quality and consistency; scholars judge it to have been set into type from a theatrical prompt-book.

The play contains many anachronistic elements from the Elizabethan era. The characters mention objects such as doublets (large, heavy jackets) – which did not exist in ancient Rome. Caesar is mentioned to be wearing an Elizabethan doublet instead of a Roman toga. At one point a clock is heard to strike and Brutus notes it with "Count the clock".

== Analysis and criticism ==
=== Historical background ===
Julius Caesar was written around 1599, during the reign of Elizabeth I, a period marked by political uncertainty regarding the succession to the English throne. Although England was at peace, Elizabeth had refused to name her successor, which raised concerns about potential instability, rebellion, or the possibility of a civil war similar to that of Rome unfolding after her death. Maria Wyke has written that the play reflects this general anxiety over the royal succession. Shakespeare's dramatisation of Caesar's assassination and the subsequent civil war would have resonated with Elizabethan audiences aware of these anxieties.

=== Protagonist debate ===
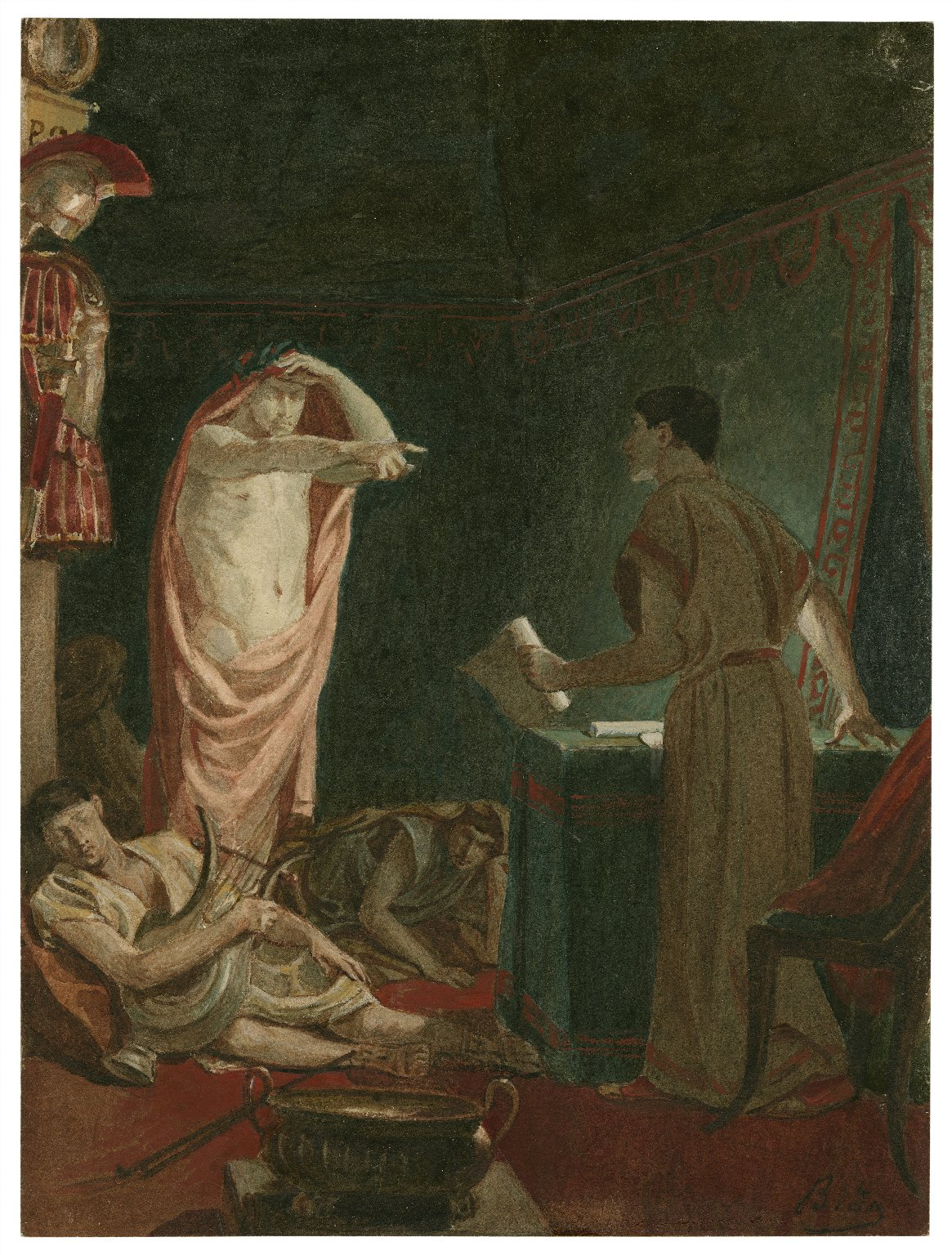
A late 19th-century painting of Act IV, Scene iii: Brutus sees Caesar's ghost

Critics of Shakespeare's play Julius Caesar differ greatly in their views of Caesar and Brutus, including debate concerning whether Caesar or Brutus is the protagonist of the play. Intertwined in this debate is a smattering of philosophical and psychological ideologies on republicanism and monarchism. One author, Robert C. Reynolds, devotes attention to the names or epithets given to both Brutus and Caesar in his essay "Ironic Epithet in Julius Caesar". He points out that Casca praises Brutus at face value, but then inadvertently compares him to a disreputable joke of a man by calling him an alchemist, "Oh, he sits high in all the people's hearts,/And that which would appear offense in us/ His countenance, like richest alchemy,/ Will change to virtue and worthiness" (I.iii.158–160). Reynolds also talks about Caesar and his "Colossus" epithet, which he points out has obvious connotations of power and manliness, but also lesser-known connotations of an outward glorious front and inward chaos.

Myron Taylor, in his essay "Shakespeare's Julius Caesar and the Irony of History", compares the logic and philosophies of Caesar and Brutus. Caesar is deemed an intuitive philosopher who is always right when he goes with his instinct; for instance, when he says he fears Cassius as a threat to him before he is killed, his intuition is correct. Brutus is portrayed as a man similar to Caesar, but whose passions lead him to the wrong reasoning, which he realizes in the end when he says in V.v.50–51, "Caesar, now be still: / I killed not thee with half so good a will".

Joseph W. Houppert acknowledges that some critics have tried to cast Caesar as the protagonist, but that ultimately Brutus is the driving force in the play and is, therefore, the tragic hero. Brutus attempts to put the republic over his relationship with Caesar and kills him. Brutus makes the political mistakes that bring down the republic that his ancestors created. He acts on his passions, does not gather enough evidence to make reasonable decisions, and is manipulated by Cassius and the other conspirators.

Traditional readings of the play may maintain that Cassius and the other conspirators are motivated largely by envy and ambition, whereas Brutus is motivated by the demands of honor and patriotism. Certainly, this is the view that Antony expresses in the final scene. But one of the central strengths of the play is that it resists categorising its characters as either simple heroes or villains. The political journalist and classicist Garry Wills maintains that "This play is distinctive because it has no villains".

It is a drama famous for the difficulty of deciding which role to emphasise. The characters rotate around each other like the plates of a Calder mobile. Touch one and it affects the position of all the others. Raise one, and another sinks. But they keep coming back into a precarious balance.

== Performance history ==
The play was probably one of Shakespeare's first to be performed at the Globe Theatre. Thomas Platter the Younger, a Swiss traveler, saw a tragedy about Julius Caesar at a Bankside theatre on 21 September 1599, and this was most likely Shakespeare's play, as there is no obvious alternative candidate. (While the story of Julius Caesar was dramatized repeatedly in the Elizabethan/Jacobean period, none of the other plays known is as good a match with Platter's description as Shakespeare's play.)

After the theatres re-opened at the start of the Restoration era, the play was revived by Thomas Killigrew's King's Company in 1672. Charles Hart initially played Brutus, as did Thomas Betterton in later productions. Julius Caesar was one of the very few Shakespeare plays that was not adapted during the Restoration period or the eighteenth century.

=== Notable performances ===
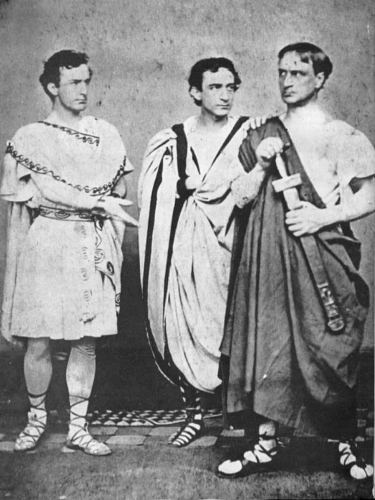
John Wilkes Booth (left), Edwin Booth and Junius Brutus Booth Jr. in Shakespeare's Julius Caesar in 1864

- 1864: Junius Jr., Edwin and John Wilkes Booth (later the assassin of U.S. President Abraham Lincoln) made their only appearance onstage together in a benefit performance of Julius Caesar on 25 November 1864, at the Winter Garden Theater in New York City. Junius Jr. played Cassius, Edwin played Brutus and John Wilkes played Mark Antony. This landmark production raised funds to erect a statue of Shakespeare in Central Park, which remains standing.
- 29 May 1916: A one-night performance in the natural bowl of Beachwood Canyon, Hollywood drew an audience of 40,000 and starred Tyrone Power Sr. and Douglas Fairbanks Sr. The student bodies of Hollywood and Fairfax High Schools played opposing armies, and the elaborate battle scenes were performed on a huge stage as well as the surrounding hillsides. The play commemorated the tercentenary of Shakespeare's death. A photograph of the elaborate stage and viewing stands can be seen on the Library of Congress website. The performance was lauded by L. Frank Baum.
- 1926: Another elaborate performance of the play was staged as a benefit for the Actors Fund of America at the Hollywood Bowl. Caesar arrived for the Lupercal in a chariot drawn by four white horses. The stage was the size of a city block and dominated by a central tower 80 feet (24 m) in height. The event was mainly aimed at creating work for unemployed actors. Three hundred gladiators appeared in an arena scene not featured in Shakespeare's play; a similar number of girls danced as Caesar's captives; a total of three thousand soldiers took part in the battle sequences.

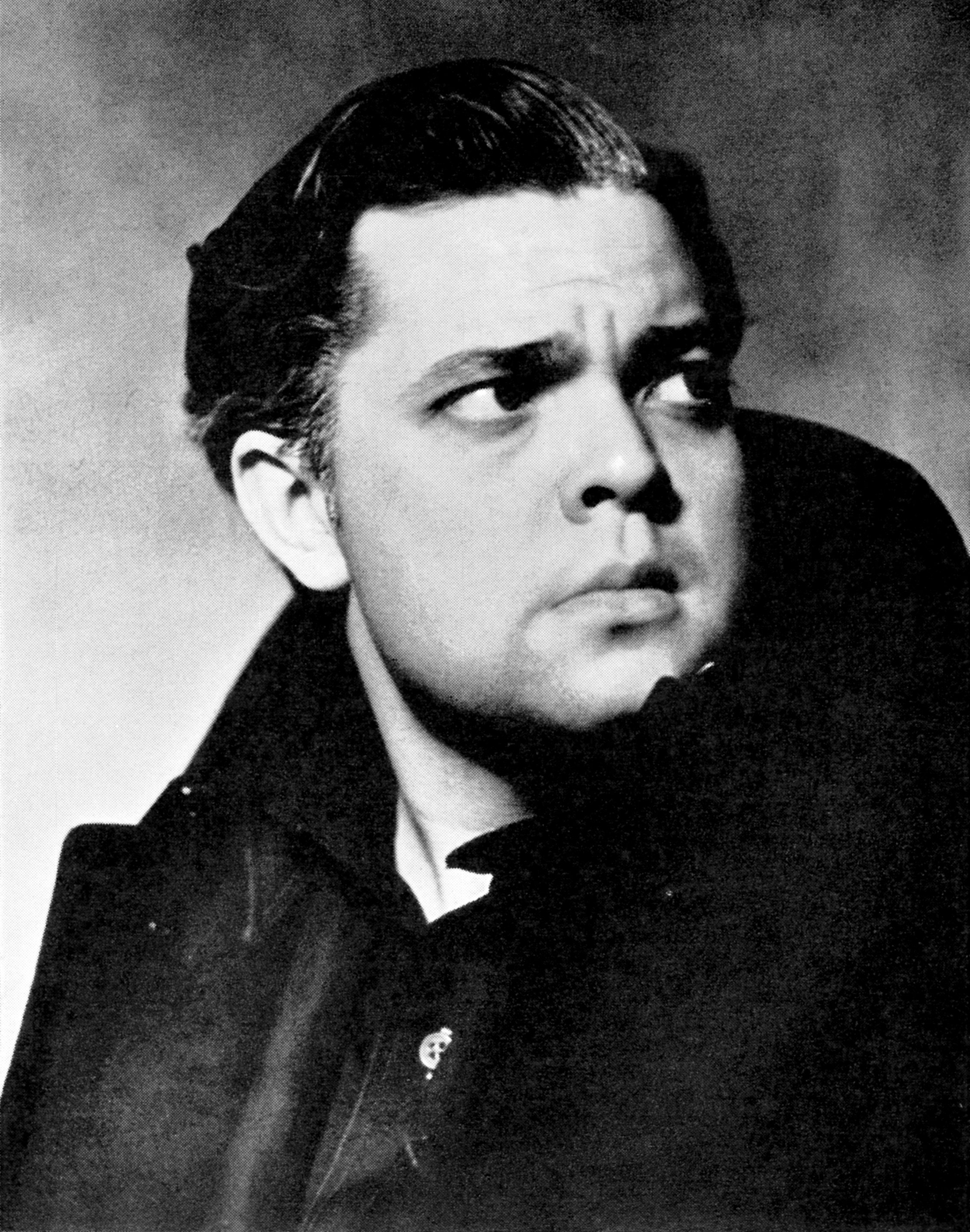
Orson Welles as Brutus in the Mercury Theatre's Caesar (1937–38)

- 1937: Caesar, Orson Welles's famous Mercury Theatre production, drew fevered comment as the director dressed his protagonists in uniforms reminiscent of those common at the time in Fascist Italy and Nazi Germany, drawing a specific analogy between Caesar and Fascist Italian leader Benito Mussolini. Time magazine gave the production a rave review, together with the New York critics. The fulcrum of the show was the slaughter of Cinna the Poet (Norman Lloyd), a scene that stopped the show. Caesar opened at the Mercury Theatre in New York City in November 1937 and moved to the larger National Theater in January 1938, running a total of 157 performances. A second company made a five-month national tour with Caesar in 1938, again to critical acclaim.
- 1950: John Gielgud played Cassius at the Shakespeare Memorial Theatre under the direction of Michael Langham and Anthony Quayle. The production was considered one of the highlights of a remarkable Stratford season and led to Gielgud (who had done little film work to that time) playing Cassius in Joseph L. Mankiewicz's 1953 film version.
- 1977: Gielgud made his final appearance in a Shakespearean role on stage as Caesar in John Schlesinger's production at the Royal National Theatre. The cast also included Ian Charleson as Octavius.
- 1994: Arvind Gaur directed the play in India with Jaimini Kumar as Brutus and Deepak Ochani as Caesar (24 shows); later on he revived it with Manu Rishi as Caesar and Vishnu Prasad as Brutus for the Shakespeare Drama Festival, Assam in 1998. Arvind Kumar translated Julius Caesar into Hindi. This production was also performed at the Prithvi international theatre festival, at the India Habitat Centre, New Delhi.
- 2005: Denzel Washington played Brutus in the first Broadway production of the play in over fifty years. The production received universally negative reviews but was a sell-out because of Washington's popularity at the box office.
- 2012: The Royal Shakespeare Company staged an all-black production under the direction of Gregory Doran.
- 2012: An all-female production starring Harriet Walter as Brutus and Frances Barber as Caesar was staged at the Donmar Warehouse, directed by Phyllida Lloyd. In October 2013, the production transferred to New York's St. Ann's Warehouse in Brooklyn.
- 2018: The Bridge Theatre staged Julius Caesar as one of its first productions, under the direction of Nicholas Hytner, with Ben Whishaw, Michelle Fairley, and David Morrissey as leads. This mirrors the play's status as one of the first productions at the Globe Theatre in 1599.

== Adaptations and cultural references ==
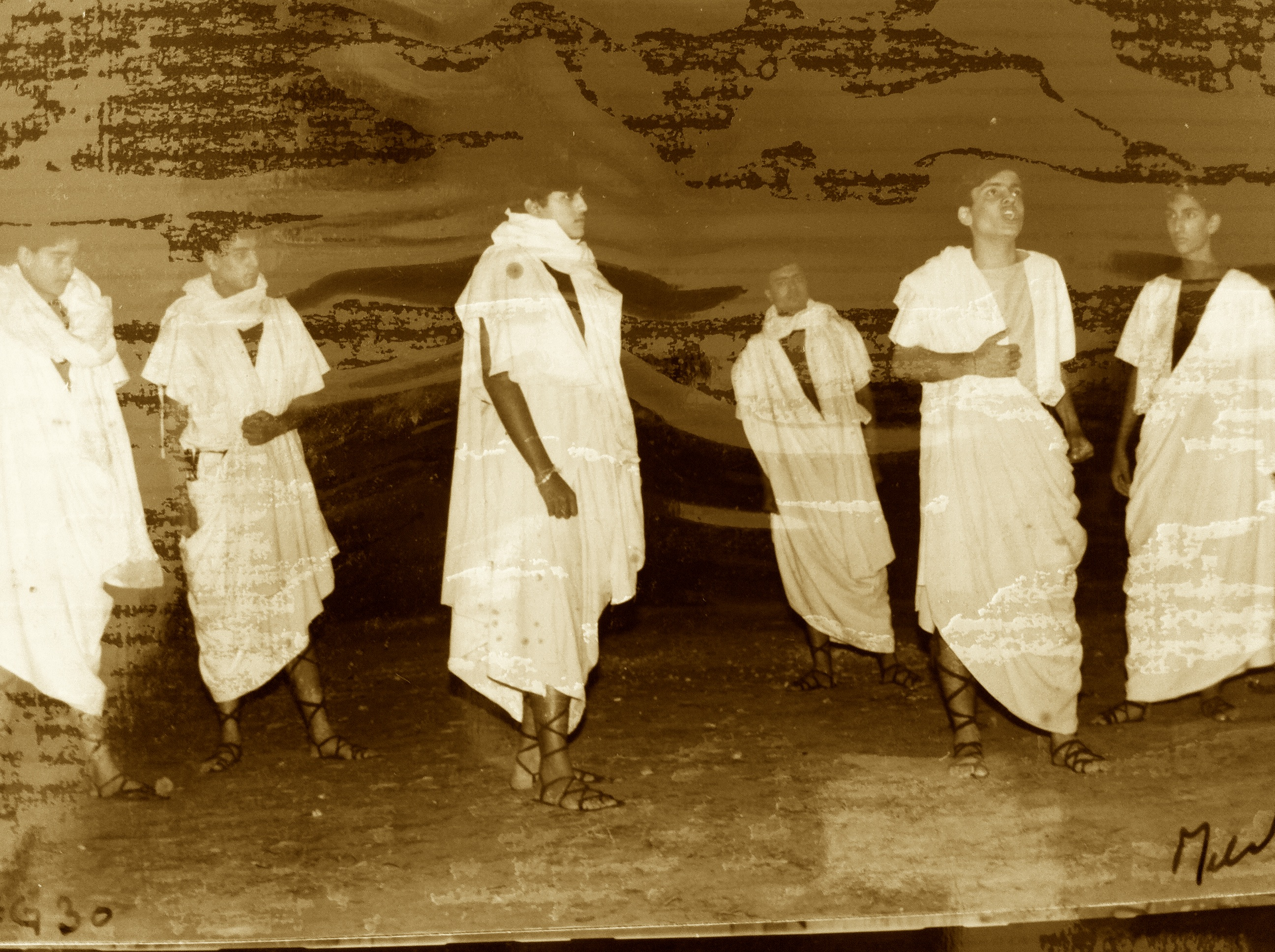
1963 production of Julius Caesar at The Doon School, India

One of the earliest cultural references to the play came in Shakespeare's own Hamlet. Prince Hamlet asks Polonius about his career as a thespian at university, and Polonius replies: "I did enact Julius Caesar. I was killed in the Capitol. Brutus killed me." This is a likely meta-reference, as Richard Burbage is generally accepted to have played leading men Brutus and Hamlet, and the older John Heminges to have played Caesar and Polonius. If the two plays were staged in the same performance cycle, Polonius' words might have functioned as an advertisement for Julius Caesar. Ben Jonson, Shakespeare's contemporary, mocked as paradoxical a line from Julius Caesar in his own work Timber; Or Discoveries Made Upon Men and Matter, apparently preserving a phrase which was not included in the First Folio. Most modern editions partially restore the line according to Jonson's quotation, so that it reads "Know Caesar doth not wrong but with just cause," whereas the First Folio had the half line "Know Caesar doth not wrong".

In 1851, the German composer Robert Schumann wrote a concert overture Julius Caesar, inspired by Shakespeare's play. Other musical settings include those by Giovanni Bononcini, Hans von Bülow, Felix Draeseke, Josef Bohuslav Foerster, John Ireland, John Foulds, Gian Francesco Malipiero, Manfred Gurlitt, Darius Milhaud, and Mario Castelnuovo-Tedesco.

The Canadian comedy duo Wayne and Shuster parodied Julius Caesar in their 1958 sketch Rinse the Blood off My Toga. Flavius Maximus, Private Roman Eye, is hired by Brutus to investigate the death of Caesar. The police procedural combines Shakespeare, Dragnet, and vaudeville jokes and was first broadcast on The Ed Sullivan Show.

In 1984, the Riverside Shakespeare Company of New York City produced a modern dress Julius Caesar set in contemporary Washington, called simply CAESAR!, starring Harold Scott as Brutus, Herman Petras as Caesar, Marya Lowry as Portia, Robert Walsh as Antony, and Michael Cook as Cassius, directed by W. Stuart McDowell at The Shakespeare Center.

In 2006, Chris Taylor from the Australian comedy team The Chaser wrote a comedy musical called Dead Caesar which was shown at the Sydney Theatre Company in Sydney.

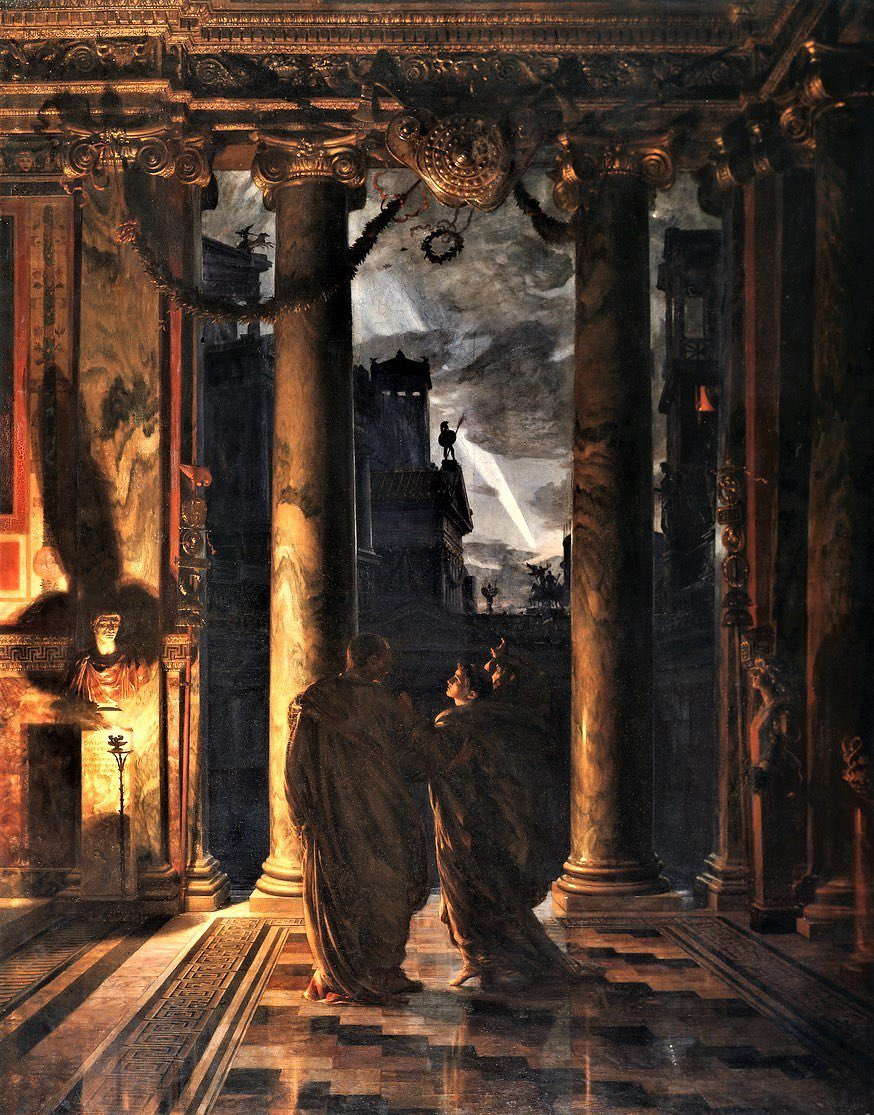
The Ides of March by Edward Poynter, 1883

The line "The Evil That Men Do", from the speech made by Mark Antony following Caesar's death ("The evil that men do lives after them; The good is oft interred with their bones.") has had many references in media, including the titles of:

- A song by Iron Maiden.
- A politically oriented film directed by J. Lee Thompson in 1984.
- A novel in the Buffy the Vampire Slayer series.

The 2008 movie Me and Orson Welles, based on a book of the same name by Robert Kaplow, is a fictional story centered around Orson Welles' famous 1937 production of Julius Caesar at the Mercury Theatre. British actor Christian McKay is cast as Welles, and co-stars with Zac Efron and Claire Danes.

The 2012 Italian drama film Caesar Must Die (Italian: Cesare deve morire), directed by Paolo and Vittorio Taviani, follows convicts in their rehearsals ahead of a prison performance of Julius Caesar.

In the Ray Bradbury book Fahrenheit 451, some of the character Beatty's last words are "There is no terror, Cassius, in your threats, for I am armed so strong in honesty that they pass me as an idle wind, which I respect not!"

The play's line "the fault, dear Brutus, is not in our stars, but in ourselves", spoken by Cassius in Act I, scene 2, is often referenced in popular culture. The line gave its name to the J.M. Barrie play Dear Brutus, and also gave its name to the best-selling young adult novel The Fault in Our Stars by John Green and its film adaptation. The same line was quoted in Edward R. Murrow's epilogue of his famous 1954 See It Now documentary broadcast concerning Senator Joseph R. McCarthy. This speech and the line were recreated in the 2005 film Good Night, and Good Luck. It was also quoted by George Clooney's character in the Coen brothers film Intolerable Cruelty.

The line "And therefore think him as a serpent's egg / Which hatched, would, as his kind grow mischievous; And kill him in the shell" spoken by Brutus in Act II, Scene 1, is referenced in the Dead Kennedys song "California über alles".

The title of Agatha Christie's novel Taken at the Flood, titled There Is a Tide in its American edition, refers to an iconic line of Brutus: "There is a tide in the affairs of men, which, taken at the flood, leads on to fortune." (Act IV, Scene III).

The line "There is a tide in the affairs of men, which taken at the flood, leads on to fortune. Omitted, all the voyage of their life is bound in shallows and in miseries. On such a full sea are we now afloat. And we must take the current when it serves, or lose our ventures" is recited by Jean-Luc Picard at the end of the Star Trek: Picard series finale, "The Last Generation." The play was previously discussed in a conversation between Julian Bashir and Elim Garak in the Star Trek: Deep Space Nine episode "Improbable Cause".

Caesar: The Musical is an all-female musical adaptation of the play written by Grace Yurchuk. On July 19, 2026, the extended play featuring six songs was released: "So Political," Marullus and Flavius' reaction to Caesar's return to Rome; "Brutus' Song," a monologue by the conflicted Brutus on Caesar's despotism; "Caesar Speaks" which regards the juxtaposing views of Cassius, Brutus, and Mark Antony at the Lupercalia festival; "Shall Rome" where Brutus is convinced to enter the conspiracy; "Storm Song," the reflections and contemplations of Brutus and Caesar as assassins and dictators, respectively; and "Brutus' Prayer" which features Brutus' prayers to his father and conflicting loyalties.

=== Film and television adaptations ===
Julius Caesar has been adapted to a number of film productions, including:

- Julius Caesar (Vitagraph Company of America, 1908), produced by J. Stuart Blackton and directed by William V. Ranous, who also played Antony.
- Julius Caesar (Avon Productions, 1950), directed by David Bradley, who played Brutus; Charlton Heston played Antony and Harold Tasker played Caesar.
- Julius Caesar (MGM, 1953), directed by Joseph L. Mankiewicz and produced by John Houseman; starring James Mason as Brutus, Marlon Brando as Antony and Louis Calhern as Caesar.
- An Honourable Murder (1960), directed by Godfrey Grayson; depicted the play in a modern business setting.
- The Spread of the Eagle, a 1963 BBC series comprising Coriolanus, Julius Caesar, and Antony & Cleopatra.
- Julius Caesar (BBC, 1969), a television adaptation in the Play of the Month series, directed by Alan Bridges.
- Julius Caesar (Commonwealth United, 1969), directed by Stuart Burge, produced by Peter Snell, starring Jason Robards as Brutus, Charlton Heston as Antony and John Gielgud as Caesar.
- Heil Caesar (BBC, 1973), a three-part television play written by John Griffith Bowen that was "a modern-dress modern-dialogue rewrite of the play, updated to an unnamed present-day regime that's about to switch from democracy to dictatorship unless Brutus and his conspirators act to prevent it." It was intended as an introduction to Shakespeare's play for schoolchildren, but it proved good enough to be shown on adult television, and a stage version was later produced. The British Universities Film & Video Council database states that the work "transforms the play into a modern political conspiracy thriller with modern dialogue and many strong allusions to political events in the early 1970."
- Julius Caesar (BBC/Time-Life TV, 1978), a television adaptation in the BBC Television Shakespeare series, directed by Herbert Wise and produced by Cedric Messina, starring Richard Pasco as Brutus, Keith Michell as Antony and Charles Gray as Caesar.
- The HBO series Rome frequently referenced notable moments and lines from the Shakespeare play.
- Julius Caesar (2010), is a short film starring Randy Harrison as Brutus and John Shea as Julius Caesar. Directed by Patrick J Donnelly and produced by Dan O'Hare.
- Caesar Must Die (2012), is an Italian film about a group of prison inmates rehearsing a play. Ultimately, the prison life and the play become indistinguishable and Mark Antony's Friends, Romans... speech is delivered in a prison courtyard with hundreds of prisoners peeking from their cell windows taking the role of Roman citizens. While the film is fictional, the actors are actual prison inmates playing themselves.
- Julius Caesar (2012), a BBC television film adaptation of the Royal Shakespeare Company stage production of the same year directed by Gregory Doran with an all-Black cast, sets the tragedy in post-independence Africa with echoes of the Arab Spring. The film stars Paterson Joseph as Brutus, Ray Fearon as Antony, Jeffery Kissoon as Caesar, Cyril Nri as Cassius and Adjoa Andoh as Portia.
- Zulfiqar (2016), a Bengali-language Indian film by Srijit Mukherji that is an adaptation of both Julius Caesar and Antony and Cleopatra and a tribute to the film The Godfather.
- Et Tu (2023), an American independent comedy horror-thriller film by Max Tzannes, set around a regional theater production of the play and its director being driven into madness.

=== Contemporary political references ===
Modern adaptions of the play have often made contemporary political references, with Caesar depicted as resembling a variety of political leaders, including Huey Long, Margaret Thatcher, and Tony Blair, as well as Fidel Castro and Oliver North. Scholar A. J. Hartley stated that this is a fairly "common trope" of Julius Caesar performances: "Throughout the 20th century and into the 21st, the rule has been to create a recognizable political world within the production. And often people in the title role itself look like or feel like somebody either in recent or current politics." A 2012 production of Julius Caesar by the Guthrie Theater and The Acting Company "presented Caesar in the guise of a black actor who was meant to suggest President Obama." This production was not particularly controversial.

In 2017, however, a modern adaptation of the play at New York's Shakespeare in the Park (performed by The Public Theater) depicted Caesar with the likeness of then-president Donald Trump and thereby aroused ferocious controversy, drawing criticism by media outlets such as The Daily Caller and Breitbart and prompting corporate sponsors Bank of America and Delta Air Lines to pull their financial support. The Public Theater stated that the message of the play is not pro-assassination and that the point is that "those who attempt to defend democracy by undemocratic means pay a terrible price and destroy the very thing they are fighting to save." Shakespeare scholars Stephen Greenblatt and Peter Holland agreed with this statement. Pallotta stated that "I have never read anyone suggesting that Julius Caesar is a play that recommends assassination. Look what happens: Caesar is assassinated to stop him from becoming a dictator. Result: civil war, massive slaughter, creation of an emperor, execution of many who sympathized with the conspiracy. Doesn't look much like a successful result for the conspirators to me." The play was interrupted several times by right-wing protesters, who accused the play of "violence against the right", and actors and members of theatres with Shakespeare in the name were harassed and received death threats, including the wife of the play's director Oskar Eustis. The protests were praised by American Family Association director Sandy Rios who compared the play with the execution of Christians by damnatio ad bestias.

The 2018 Bridge Theatre production also incorporates modern political imagery. The commoners in the first scene sing modern punk music and Caesar distributes red hats to the audience that are remarkably similar to Donald Trump's campaign merchandise. The conspirators also use modern firearms during the assassination and the Battle of Phillipi.

== See also ==
- 1599 in literature
- Assassinations in fiction
- Caesar's Comet
- Mark Antony's Funeral Speech
- "The dogs of war"
- List of idioms attributed to Shakespeare
