= Epidius =

1st century BC Roman rhetorician

Epidius (1st century BC) was an Ancient Roman rhetorician who taught the art of oratory towards the close of the republic, numbering Marcus Antonius and Octavianus among his scholars. His skill, however, was not sufficient to save him from a conviction for malicious accusation (calumnia).

We are told that he claimed descent from Epidius Nuncionus (the name is probably corrupted), a rural deity, who appears to have been worshipped upon the banks of the Sarnus (modern Sarno) in Campania.

== See also ==
- Epidia gens
