= Publius Servilius Casca =

Roman senator and assassin of Julius Caesar

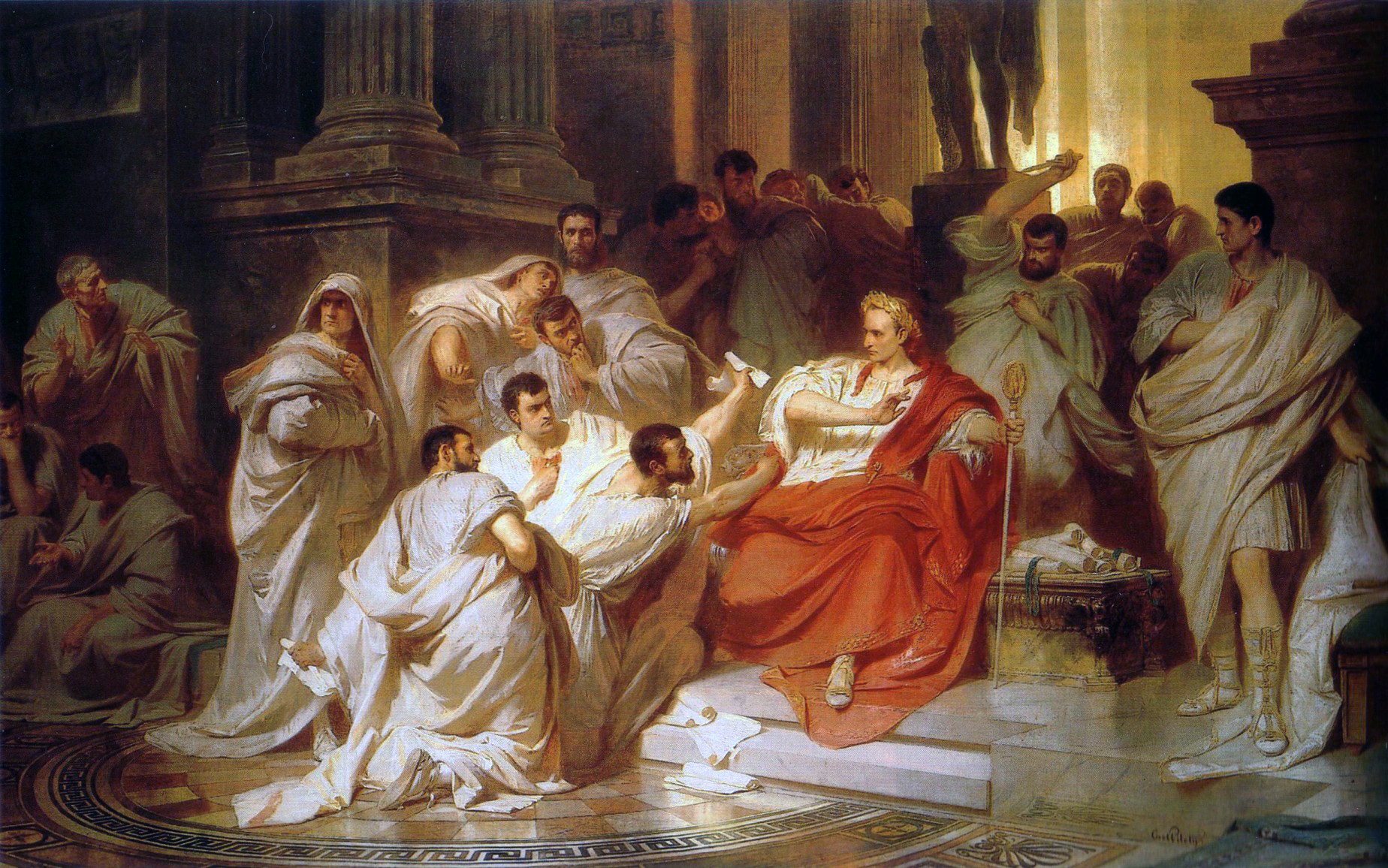
Cimber (centre) holds out and pulls at Caesar's tunic, while Casca behind prepares to strike: painting by Karl von Piloty.

Publius Servilius Casca Longus (died c. 42 BC) was one of the assassins of Julius Caesar and plebeian tribune in 43 BC. He and several other senators conspired to kill him, a plan which they carried out on 15 March 44 BC. Afterward, Casca fought with the liberators during the Liberators' civil war. He is believed to have died at the Battle of Phillipi either by suicide or at the hands of Octavian's forces.

== Life ==
Despite initially being a supporter of Caesar, Casca and his brother (whose name is unknown) joined in the assassination. Casca struck the first blow, attacking Caesar from behind and hitting his bare shoulders, after Tillius Cimber had distracted the dictator by grabbing his toga. Caesar replied "Casca, you villain, what are you doing?" and tussled with him for several seconds. Casca simultaneously shouted to his brother in Greek, "Brother, help me!" The other assassins then joined in.

In December 44 BC, Casca assumed office as plebeian tribune. No unrest was associated with his taking office and he allied himself with Cicero and Brutus' mother Servilia. However, after Octavian marched on Rome during the War of Mutina, Casca fled the city and joined Marcus Junius Brutus and Gaius Cassius Longinus, the leaders of the assassins, in the Liberators' civil war against the Second Triumvirate of Antony, Lepidus, and Octavian. When he fled the city, his colleague, Publius Titius, had Casca's tribunate abrogated. He seems to have died, probably by suicide, in the aftermath of their defeat at the Battle of Philippi, in October 42 BC. There is no reference to him in any of the sources after this date.

Casca is commemorated on a coin along with Brutus, in which a bearded figure is depicted next to his name. However, this appears to be the god Neptune rather than a portrait of Casca. Elmley Lovett in England is the place where a coin hoard was found to include a rare Roman Republican silver denarius of Brutus with Casca Longus struck at a mint moving with Brutus 43-42 BC.

A house containing a table inscribed with his name is found in Pompeii.

== Dramatic depictions ==
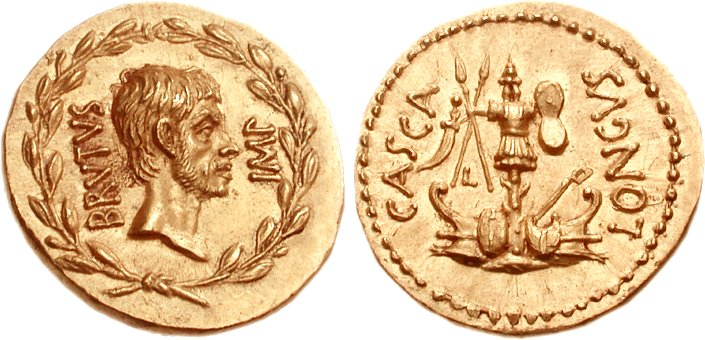
A coin celebrating Casca and Brutus

- He is called "envious Casca" by Mark Antony in William Shakespeare's play Julius Caesar (1599). He is also referred to as "dull" and having a "sour fashion". He speaks in prose more frequently than the other characters who usually speak in verse.
  - "See what a rent the envious Casca made". The two words became the title of a mystery novel by Georgette Heyer.
- In the 1934 film Cleopatra, Casca is portrayed by Edwin Maxwell.
- In the 1937–38 Mercury Theatre stage production Caesar, Publius was played by Joseph Cotten.
- In the 1953 film of Shakespeare's Julius Caesar, Casca is portrayed by Edmond O'Brien.
- In the 1963 film Cleopatra, Casca is portrayed by Carroll O'Connor.
- In the 1970 film of Shakespeare's Julius Caesar, Casca is portrayed by Robert Vaughn.
- In the 1999 miniseries Cleopatra, Casca is portrayed by David Schofield.
- In the TV series Rome (2005–07), Casca is portrayed by Peter Gevisser.
- In a 2018 National Theatre production at the Bridge Theatre, Casca is portrayed by Adjoa Andoh

== See also ==
- Servilia gens
