= List of idioms attributed to Shakespeare =

The influence of William Shakespeare on the English language is pervasive. Shakespeare introduced or invented countless words in his plays, with estimates of the number in the several thousands. Warren King clarifies by saying that, "In all of his work – the plays, the sonnets and the narrative poems – Shakespeare uses 17,677 words: Of those, 1,700 were first used by Shakespeare." He is also well known for borrowing words from foreign languages as well as classical literature. He created these words by "changing nouns into verbs, changing verbs into adjectives, connecting words never before used together, adding prefixes and suffixes, and devising words wholly original." Many of Shakespeare's original phrases are still used in conversation and language today.

While it is probable that Shakespeare created many new words, an article in National Geographic points out the findings of historian Jonathan Hope who wrote in "Shakespeare's 'Native English'" that "the Victorian scholars who read texts for the first edition of the OED paid special attention to Shakespeare: his texts were read more thoroughly and cited more often, so he is often credited with the first use of words, or senses of words, which can, in fact, be found in other writers."

== A ==
- A blinking idiot. The Merchant of Venice. Act 2. Scene 9.
- A dish fit for the Gods. Julius Caesar. Act 2. Scene 1.
- A horse, a horse, my kingdom for a horse! Richard III. Act 5. Scene 4.
- A plague on both your houses. Romeo and Juliet. Act 3. Scene 1.
- All that glitters isn’t gold. The Merchant of Venice. Act 2. Scene 7.
- All the world’s a stage. And all the men and women merely players. As You Like It. Act 2. Scene 7.
- All’s well that ends well. All's Well That Ends Well. Act 4. Scene 4.
- At one fell swoop. Macbeth. Act 4. Scene 3.

== B ==
- Be cruel only to be kind. Hamlet. Act 3. Scene 4.
- Be not afraid of greatness. Some are born great, some achieve greatness, some have greatness thrust upon 'em. Twelfth Night. Act 2. Scene 5.
- Better three hours too soon than a minute too late. The Merry Wives of Windsor. Act 2. Scene 2.
- Beware the ides of March. Julius Caesar. Act 1. Scene 2.
- Brave new world. The Tempest. Act 5. Scene 2.
- Break the ice. The Taming of the Shrew. Act 1. Scene 2.
- Brevity is the soul of wit. Hamlet. Act 2. Scene 2.

== C–D–E ==
- Come what may. Macbeth. Act 1. Scene 3.
- Cowards die many times before their death; the valiant only taste of death but once. Julius Caesar. Act 2. Scene 2.
- Dead as a doornail. Henry VI, Part 2. Act 4. Scene 10.
- Double, double toil and trouble. Macbeth. Act 4. Scene 1.
- Et tu, Brute! Then fall, Caesar. Julius Caesar. Act 3. Scene 1.

== F ==
- Fair is foul and foul is fair. Macbeth. Act 1. Scene 1.
- Fair play. The Tempest. Act 5. Scene 1.
- Foregone conclusion. Othello. Act 3. Scene 3.
- Frailty, thy name is woman. Hamlet. Act 1. Scene 2.
- Friends, Romans, countrymen, lend me your ears. Julius Caesar. Act 3. Scene 2.
- Full fathom five thy father lies. The Tempest. Act 1. Scene 2.

== G ==
- Get thee to a nunnery. Hamlet. Act 3. Scene 1.
- Give every man thy ear, but few thy voice. Hamlet. Act 1. Scene 3.
- Good night, sweet prince. Hamlet. Act 5. Scene 2.
- Good riddance. Troilus and Cressida. Act 2. Scene 1.

== H ==
- He hath eaten me out of house and home. Henry VI, Part 2. Act 2. Scene 1.
- Hell is empty and all the devils are here. The Tempest. Act 1. Scene 2.
- How now? Even so quickly can one catch the plague? Twelfth Night. Act 1. Scene 5.
- Heart of gold. Henry V. Act 4. Scene 1.
- Hoist with his own petard, Hamlet. Act 3. Scene 4.
- How sharper than a serpent’s tooth it is to have a thankless child. King Lear. Act 1. Scene 4.

== I ==
- I am a man, more sinned against than sinning. King Lear. Act 3. Scene 2.
- I wasted time and now doth time waste me. Richard II. Act 5. Scene 5.
- If music be the food of love, play on. Twelfth Night. Act 1. Scene 1.
- If you prick us, do we not bleed? The Merchant of Venice. Act 3. Scene 1.
- In my heart of heart. Hamlet. Act 3. Scene 2.
- In stitches. Twelfth Night. Act 3. Scene 2.
- It is a tale told by an idiot, full of sound and fury, signifying nothing. Macbeth. Act 5. Scene 5.
- It’s Greek to me. Julius Caesar. Act 1. Scene 2.
- I see, lady, the gentleman is not in your books. Much Ado About Nothing. Act 1, Scene 1.

== J ==
- Jaws of death. Twelfth Night. Act 3. Scene 4.
- Jealousy is the green-eyed monster. Othello. Act 3. Scene 3.

== K ==
- Kill with kindness. The Taming of the Shrew. Act 4. Scene 1.
- Kiss me, Kate. The Taming of the Shrew. Act 2. Scene 1.
- Knock, knock. Who’s there …? Macbeth. Act 2 Scene 3.

== L ==
- Let slip the dogs of war. Julius Caesar. Act 3. Scene 1.
- Let’s kill all the lawyers. Henry VI, Part 2. Act 4. Scene 2.
- Lie low. Much Ado about Nothing. Act 5. Scene 1.
- Lord, we know what we are, but know not what we may be. Hamlet. Act 4. Scene 5.
- Lord, what fools these mortals be. A Midsummer Night’s Dream. Act 1. Scene 1.
- Love all, trust a few, do wrong to none. All's Well that Ends Well. Act 1. Scene 1.
- Love is blind. The Merchant of Venice. Act 2. Scene 6.

== M ==
- Men of few words are the best men. Henry V. Act 3. Scene 2.
- Melted into air, into thin air. The Tempest. Act 4. Scene 1.
- Though this be madness, yet there is method in't. Hamlet. Act 2. Scene 2.
- My bounty is as boundless as the sea, my love as deep. Romeo and Juliet. Act 2 Scene 2.
- My salad days. Antony and Cleopatra. Act 1.Scene 5.

== N ==
- Neither a borrower nor a lender be. Hamlet. Act 1. Scene 3.
- Neither rhyme nor reason. The Comedy of Errors. Act 2. Scene 2.
- Night owl. The Rape of Lucrece.
- No legacy is so rich as honesty. All's Well that Ends Well. Act 3. Scene 5.
- Nothing will come of nothing. King Lear. Act 1. Scene 1.
- Not that I loved Caesar less, but that I loved Rome more. Julius Caesar. Act 3. Scene 2.
- Now is the winter of our discontent made glorious summer by this sun of York. Richard III. Act 1. Scene 1.

== O ==
- O Romeo, Romeo, wherefore art thou Romeo? Romeo and Juliet. Act 2. Scene 1.
- Off with his head. Henry VI, Part 3. Act 1. Scene 4.
- Once more unto the breach. Henry V. Act 3. Scene 1.
- One touch of nature makes the whole world kin. Troilus and Cressida. Act 3. Scene 3.
- Our revels now are ended. The Tempest. Act 4. Scene 1.
- Out, damned spot. Macbeth. Act 5. Scene 1.
- Out, out, brief candle! Macbeth. Act 5. Scene 5.
- Own flesh and blood. Hamlet. Act 1. Scene 5.

== P ==
- Parting is such sweet sorrow. Romeo and Juliet. Act 2. Scene 1.
- Pound of flesh. The Merchant of Venice. Act 4. Scene 1.

== S ==
- Shall I compare thee to a summer’s day? Thou art more lovely and more temperate. Sonnet 18.
- Short shrift. Richard III. Act 3. Scene 4.
- Something is rotten in the state of Denmark. Hamlet. Act 1. Scene 4.
- Something wicked this way comes. Macbeth. Act 4. Scene 1.
- Sound and fury. Macbeth. Act 5. Scene 5.
- Star-crossed lovers. Romeo and Juliet. Prologue.
- Sterner stuff. Julius Caesar. Act 3. Scene 2.
- Suit the action to the word, the word to the action. Hamlet. Act 3. Scene 2.
- Sweet are the uses of adversity. As You Like It. Act 2. Scene 1.

== T ==
- That way madness lies. King Lear. Act 3. Scene 4.
- The be-all and the end-all. Macbeth. Act 1. Scene 7.
- The better part of valour is discretion. Henry IV, Part 1. Act 5, scene 4.
- The apparel oft proclaims the man. Hamlet. Act 1. Scene 3.
- The course of true love never did run smooth. A Midsummer Night's Dream. Act 1. Scene 1.
- The evil that men do lives after them; the good is oft interred with their bones. Julius Caesar. Act 3, Scene 2.
- The lady doth protest too much, methinks. Hamlet. Act 3. Scene 2.
- The readiness is all. Hamlet. Act 5. Scene 2.
- The world’s mine oyster. Merry Wives of Windsor. Act 2. Scene 2.
- There is a tide in the affairs of men. Julius Caesar. Act 4. Scene 3.
- Thereby hangs a tale. As You Like It. Act 2. Scene 7.
- Though she be but little, she is fierce. A Midsummer Night's Dream. Act 3. Scene 2.
- Tis time to fear when tyrants seems to kiss. Pericles. Act 1. Scene 2.
- To be or not to be, that is the question. Hamlet. Act 3, scene 1.
- To thine own self be true. Hamlet. Act 1. Scene 3.
- Too much of a good thing. As You Like It. Act 4. Scene 1.
- Tower of strength. Richard III. Act 5. Scene 3.

== U–V ==
- Uneasy lies the head that wears the crown. Henry IV, Part 2. Act 3. Scene 1.
- Villain, I have done thy mother. Titus Andronicus. Act 4. Scene 2.

== W ==
- We are such stuff as dreams are made on: and our little life is rounded with a sleep. The Tempest. Act 4. Scene 1.
- We have seen better days. As You Like It. Act 2. Scene 7.
- Wear your heart on your sleeve. Othello. Act 1. Scene 1.
- What a piece of work is man. Hamlet. Act 1. Scene 1.
- What’s done is done. Macbeth. Act 3. Scene 2.
- What’s in a name? That which we call a rose by any other word would smell as sweet. Romeo and Juliet. Act 2. Scene 1.
- What's past is prologue. The Tempest. Act 2. Scene 1.
- What the dickens. Merry Wives of Windsor. Act 3. Scene 2.
- What, you egg? Macbeth. Act 4. Scene 2.
- Why there’s a wench! The Taming of the Shrew. Act 5. Scene 1.
- Wild goose chase. Romeo and Juliet. Act 2. Scene 4.
- Winged Cupid painted blind. A Midsummer Night's Dream. Act 1. Scene 1.

== Y ==
- Yond Cassius has a lean and hungry look. He thinks too much: such men are dangerous. Julius Caesar. Act 1. Scene 2.
