= Julius Caesar (1950 film) =

1950 film by David Bradley

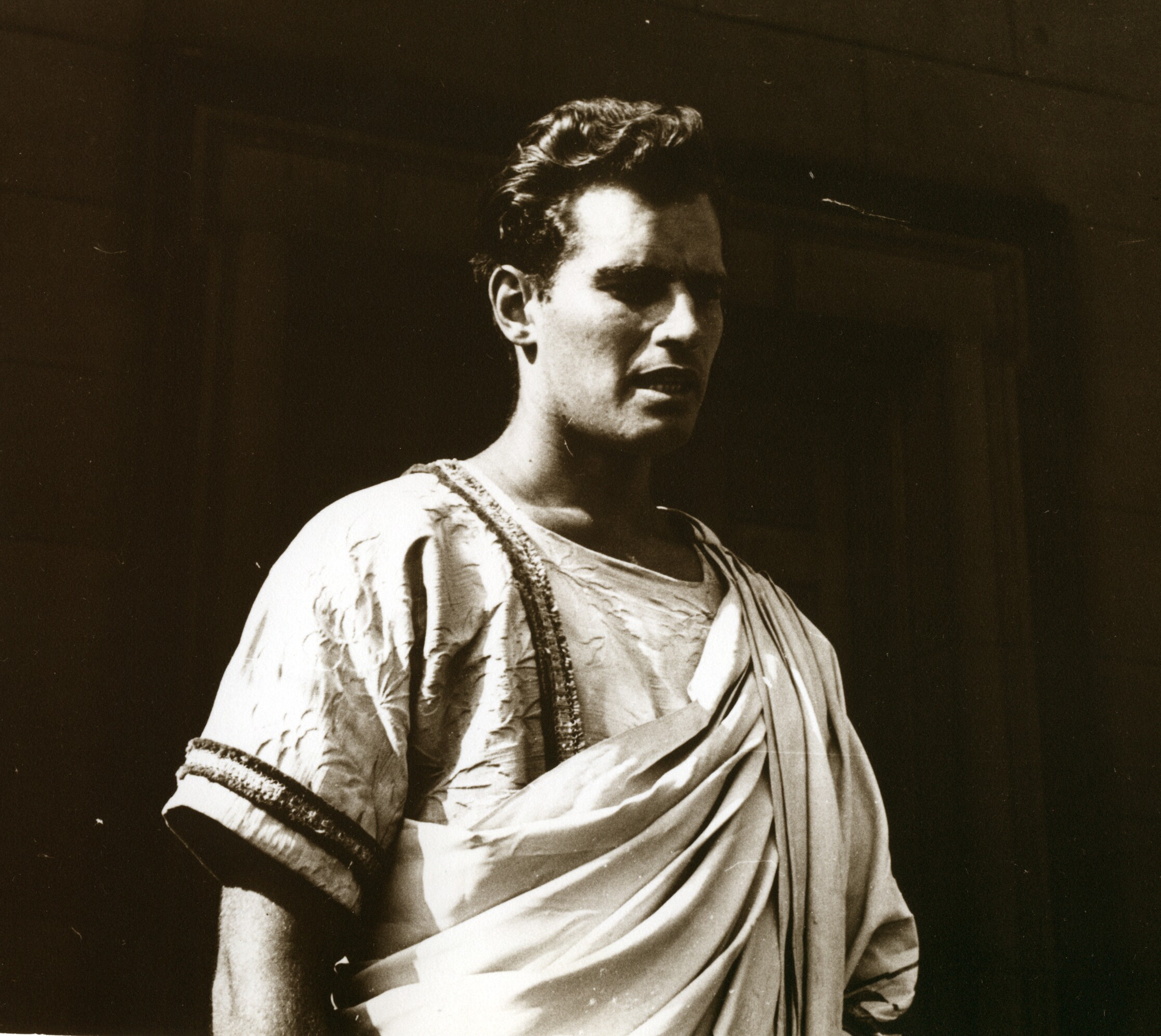
- Charlton Heston as Antony
- Directed by: David Bradley
- Written by: David Bradley (script)
- Based on: Julius Caesar; 1599 play by William Shakespeare
- Produced by: David Bradley
- Starring: Harold Tasker; Charlton Heston; David Bradley; Theodore Cloak; Mary Sefton Darr
- Cinematography: Louis McMahon
- Music by: Chuck Zornig
- Distributed by: Brandon Films Inc.
- Release date: March 1950
- Running time: 106 minutes
- Country: United States
- Language: English

Julius Caesar is a 1950 film adaptation of the Shakespeare play Julius Caesar starring Charlton Heston. The first film version of the play with sound, it was produced and directed by David Bradley using actors from the Chicago area. Heston, who had known Bradley since his youth and who was establishing himself in television and theater in New York City, portrayed Mark Antony. He was the only paid cast member. Bradley himself played Brutus, and Harold Tasker had the title role.

== Cast ==
- Charlton Heston as Mark Antony
- David Bradley as Brutus
- Harold Tasker as Julius Caesar
- Bob Holt as Octavius Caesar

== Production ==
The 16 mm film was shot in 1949 on several locations around the Chicago area, including Soldier Field, the Museum of Science and Industry, the Field Museum of Natural History, the downtown post office, and the Elks National Veterans Memorial. The Indiana sand dunes on Lake Michigan were used for the Battle of Philippi. One indoor set was built in the Chicago suburb of Evanston. To save money, around 80% of the film was shot silently with the dialogue dubbed in later by the actors.

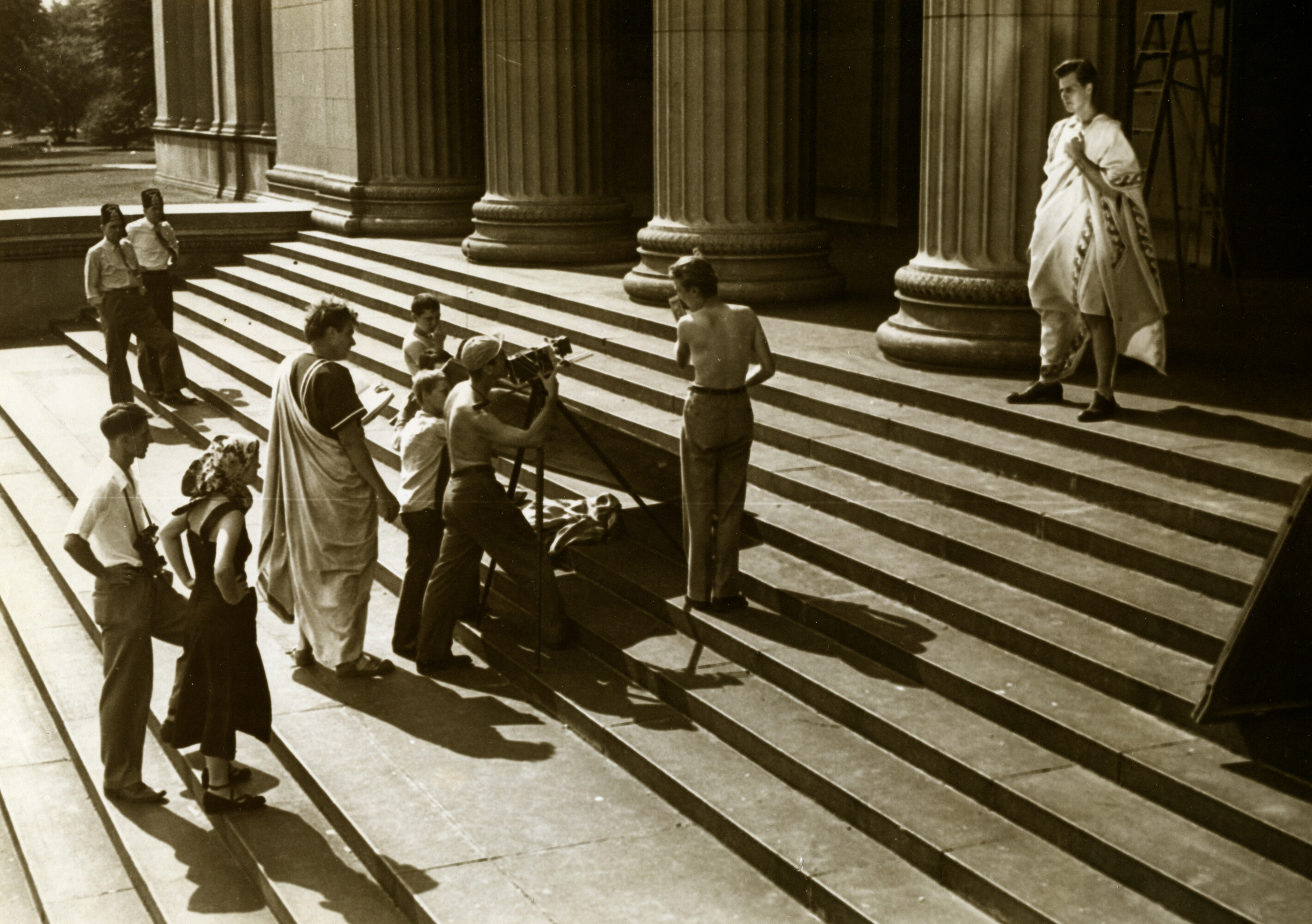
Production shot from Julius Caesar

Jeffrey Hunter appears in a small part.

== Release ==
After its premiere in Evanston in 1950, the film had only a limited distribution in the United States, where it was mainly shown in schools and colleges. In 1951, it played at the Edinburgh International Film Festival, then opened in New York City in late 1952. The film was shown at the Locarno Film Festival in 1953 where it tied for first place for the first prize. On the basis of a private screening in Hollywood, Metro-Goldwyn-Mayer hired Bradley as a directing intern in 1950.

Two decades later, Heston reprised his role as Mark Antony in both Julius Caesar and Antony and Cleopatra.

=== Critical reception ===
Upon the film's opening in New York City, The New York Times credited its "company of earnest collegians" with giving "firm pictorial character" to classic drama.

== See also ==
- List of historical drama films
- List of films set in ancient Rome
- Julius Caesar (1953 film)
- Julius Caesar (1970 film)
