= Friends, Romans, countrymen, lend me your ears =

Quote from Shakespeare's Julius Caesar

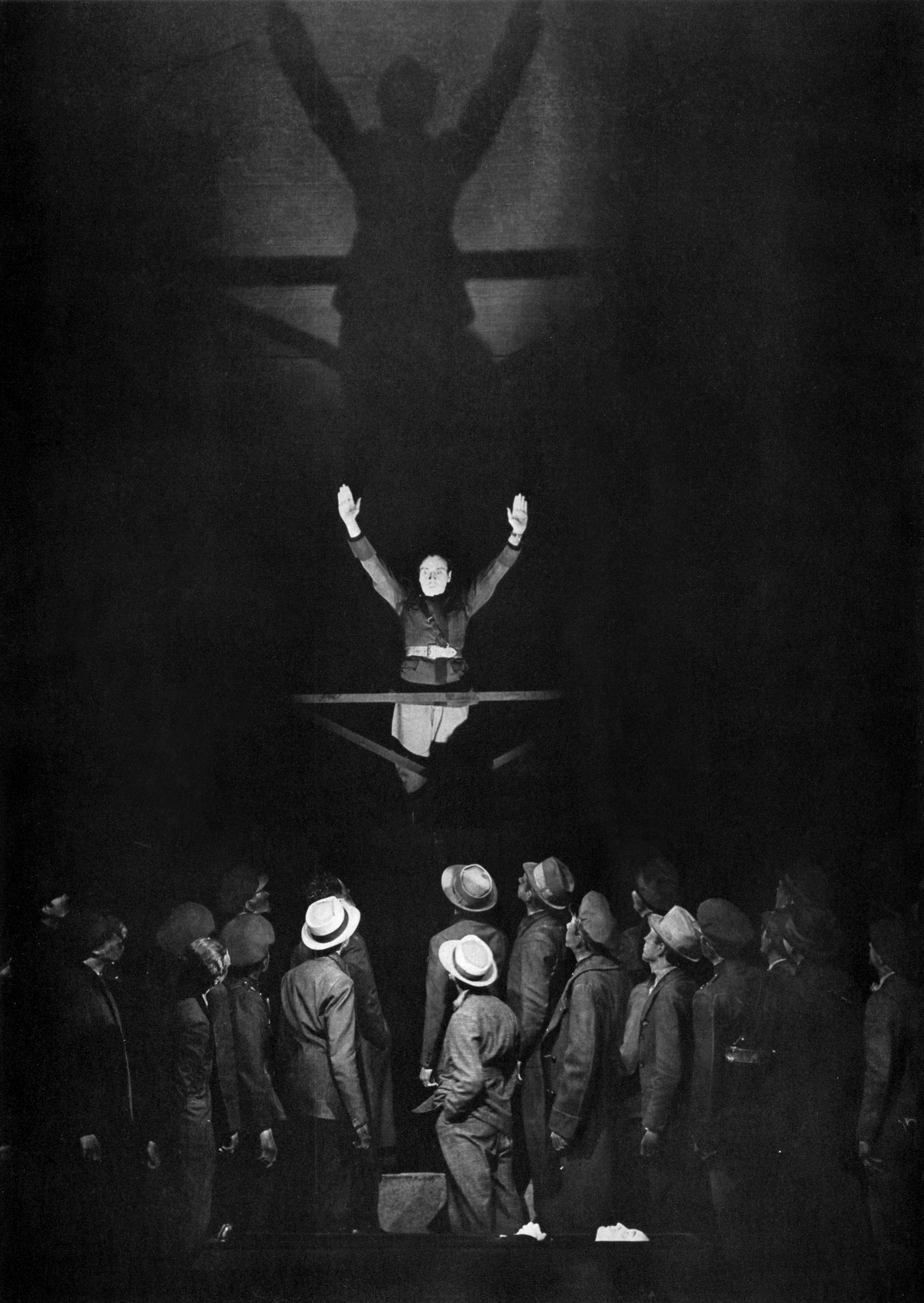
Orson Welles' Broadway production of Caesar (1937), a modern-dress production that evoked comparison to contemporary Fascist Italy and Nazi Germany

"Friends, Romans, countrymen, lend me your ears" is the first line of a speech by Mark Antony in the play Julius Caesar, by William Shakespeare. Occurring in Act III, scene II, it is one of the most famous lines, if not the most famous, in all of Shakespeare's works.

== Summary ==
Friends, Romans, countrymen, lend me your ears;
I come to bury Caesar, not to praise him.
The evil that men do lives after them;
The good is oft interred with their bones;
So let it be with Caesar. The noble Brutus
Hath told you Caesar was ambitious:
If it were so, it was a grievous fault,
And grievously hath Caesar answer’d it.
Here, under leave of Brutus and the rest–
For Brutus is an honourable man;
So are they all, all honourable men–
Come I to speak in Caesar’s funeral.
He was my friend, faithful and just to me:
But Brutus says he was ambitious;
And Brutus is an honourable man.
He hath brought many captives home to Rome
Whose ransoms did the general coffers fill:
Did this in Caesar seem ambitious?
When that the poor have cried, Caesar hath wept:
Ambition should be made of sterner stuff:
Yet Brutus says he was ambitious;
And Brutus is an honourable man.
You all did see that on the Lupercal
I thrice presented him a kingly crown,
Which he did thrice refuse: was this ambition?
Yet Brutus says he was ambitious;
And, sure, he is an honourable man.
I speak not to disprove what Brutus spoke,
But here I am to speak what I do know.
You all did love him once, not without cause:
What cause withholds you then, to mourn for him?
O judgment! thou art fled to brutish beasts,
And men have lost their reason. Bear with me;
My heart is in the coffin there with Caesar,
And I must pause till it come back to me.
— Julius Caesar (Act 3, Scene 2, lines 73–108)

Antony has been allowed by Brutus and the other conspirators to make a funeral oration for Caesar on the condition that Antony will not blame the conspirators for Caesar's death; however, while Antony's speech outwardly begins by justifying the actions of Brutus and the assassins, Antony uses rhetoric and genuine reminders to ultimately portray Caesar in such a positive light that the crowd is enraged against the conspirators.

Throughout his speech, Antony calls the conspirators "honourable men" – his implied sarcasm becoming increasingly obvious. He begins by carefully rebutting the notion that his friend, Caesar, deserved to die because he was ambitious, instead claiming that his actions were for the good of the Roman people, whom he cared for deeply ("When that the poor have cried, Caesar hath wept: / Ambition should be made of sterner stuff"). He denies that Caesar wanted to make himself king, for there were many who witnessed the latter's denying the crown three times.

As Antony reflects on Caesar's death and the injustice that nobody mourns for him, he becomes overwhelmed with emotion and deliberately pauses ("My heart is in the coffin there with Caesar, / And I must pause till it come back to me"). As he does this, the crowd begins to turn against the conspirators.

Antony then teases the crowd with Caesar's will, which they beg him to read, but he refuses. Antony tells the crowd to "have patience" and expresses his feeling that he will "wrong the honourable men / Whose daggers have stabb'd Caesar" if he is to read the will. The crowd, increasingly agitated, calls the conspirators "traitors" and demands that Antony read out the will.

Instead of reading the will immediately, however, he focuses the crowd's attention on Caesar's body, pointing out his wounds and stressing the conspirators' betrayal of a man who trusted them, in particular the betrayal of Brutus ("Judge, O you gods, how dearly Caesar loved him!"). In response to the passion of the crowd, Antony denies that he is trying to agitate them ("I come not, friends, to steal away your hearts"), and he contrasts Brutus, "an orator", with himself, "a plain, blunt man", implying that Brutus has manipulated them through deceitful rhetoric. He claims that if he were as eloquent as Brutus, he could give a voice to each of Caesar's wounds ("... that should move / The stones of Rome to rise and mutiny").

After that, Antony deals his final blow by revealing Caesar's will, in which "To every Roman citizen he gives, / To every several man, seventy-five drachmas" as well as land, to the crowd. He ends his speech with a dramatic flourish: "Here was a Caesar! When comes such another?", at which point the crowd begins to riot and search out the assassins with the intention of killing them.

Antony then utters to himself: "Now let it work. Mischief, thou art afoot, / Take thou what course thou wilt!"

== As an icon of rhetoric ==
The speech is a famous example of the use of emotionally charged rhetoric.

Comparisons have been drawn between this speech and political speeches throughout history, in terms of the rhetorical devices employed to win over a crowd.

== See also ==
- List of idioms attributed to Shakespeare
