= Publius Volumnius =

Publius Volumnius was a 1st-century BC Roman philosopher, and a friend and companion of Marcus Junius Brutus who led the conspiracy to assassinate Julius Caesar. Volumnius and Brutus had been students of philosophy together.

Volumnius accompanied Brutus on his fateful campaign to the East, which culminated in Brutus' suicide after his defeat by the Triumvirs in the Second Battle of Philippi (October 23, 42 BC).

The historian Plutarch, in his Life of Brutus, uses Volumnius' recollections as a source for an account of the prodigies which supposedly preceded the death of Brutus. Volumnius' writings were also drawn upon by Plutarch for first-hand information on the last hours of Brutus in the aftermath of the battle. Volumnius was asked by Brutus to assist him in his suicide, but Volumnius refused the request.

The well-known quote by Brutus calling down a curse upon Mark Antony was also taken from the memoirs of Volumnius:

Forget not, Zeus, the author of these crimes (in the Dryden translation this passage is given as Punish, great Jove, the illustrator of these ills).

Plutarch wrote that, according to Volumnius, Brutus repeated two verses, but Volumnius was only able to recall the one quoted.

Volumnius appears as a character in Shakespeare's play Julius Caesar.
