= Artemidorus of Knidos =

Native of Knidos, best known as a minor character in Julius Caesar

Artemidorus of Knidos (Ancient Greek: Ἀρτεμίδωρος), 1st century BC, was a native of Knidos in southwest Anatolia.

He is now best known as a minor character in Shakespeare's play Julius Caesar where, aware of the plot against Caesar's life, he attempts to warn him with a written note. Although Caesar takes the note he does not look at it before entering the Senate and shortly thereafter is assassinated. The story originates with Plutarch.

The name Artemidorus was found on an inscription at Knidos by geologist William Hamilton in the 1830s. It occurs along with the name Gaius Julius Theopompus, a friend of Julius Caesar, also mentioned by Plutarch. From the inscription, it appears that Artemidorus was the name of both the father and the son of Theopompus. G. Hirschfield argued that Artemidorus was the son and cites a further inscription which is also discussed by C. T. Newton. This describes the honors to be given – including an altar to be built and maintained, and celebratory games – to a person whose name is unfortunately missing. However, since the games were to be called “Artemidoreia”, the likely honoree was Artemidorus.

That Artemidorus was honored in this way could be due to the tax remittance granted by Caesar to the Knidians as a reward for his families’ adherence. The Newton inscription ends by stating that the honors would be equal to those of the Gods, and Jenkins points out that Artemidorus may have been the last citizen of the Roman Republic to be made a God in his own lifetime.
