= Calumnia (Roman law) =

In Roman law during the Republic, calumnia was the willful bringing of a false accusation, that is, malicious prosecution. The English word "calumny" derives from the Latin.

The Roman legal system lacked state prosecutors; crimes were prosecuted by any individual with sufficient legal training who chose to make the case. Prosecutions were often politically motivated, but a prosecutor who brought an accusation wrongfully could be sued under the Lex Remmia de calumnia if the accused was absolved of the crime. In this sense, calumnia resembled a charge of defamation or libel. The person found guilty of calumnia was subject to the same punishment the person he falsely accused would have received.

== Notable cases ==
One particularly well-documented trial that resulted in calumnia was that of M. Aemilius Scaurus, the praetor of 56 BC, who spoke in his own defense. Cicero was among his team of six advocates. Scaurus was charged under the Lex Iulia de repetundis for alleged misconduct during his governorship of Sardinia in 55 BC. A lengthy list of character witnesses is preserved. He was acquitted, with only four of twenty-two senators voting to convict, two of twenty-three equites, and two of twenty-five tribuni aerarii ("tribunes of the treasury"). Ten of these jurors voted that two of the prosecutors, Marcus Pacuvius Claudius and his brother Quintus, had committed calumnia, and three voted that a third prosecutor, Lucius Marius, had also done so. Although the presiding praetor allowed charges of calumnia to proceed, all three were acquitted, even though the jury seems to have been the same.

Another case involving calumnia is mentioned by Cicero in his first speech against Verres.

During the time of Sulla, Afrania, a senator's wife, appeared so often before the praetor that muliebris calumnia ("woman's calumny") became regarded as pernicious to the legal system. An edict was consequently enacted that prohibited women from bringing claims on behalf of others, though they continued to be active in the courts in other ways.

During the Imperial era, a charge of calumnia could also result from an ill-considered accusation, even if made without malice.

== See also ==
- Calunnia, the modern Italian legal doctrine
- Roman litigation
