= Calunnia =

Criminal offence in the Italian Penal Code

Calunnia (Italian pronunciation: [kaˈlunnja]) in Italian law is a false accusation. It is a criminal offence under Article 368 of the Italian Penal Code (Codice Penale), which states:

Anyone who with a denunciation, complaint, demand or request, even anonymously or under a false name, directs a judicial authority or other authority that has an obligation to report, to blame someone for a crime who he knows is innocent, that is he fabricates evidence against someone, shall be punished with imprisonment from two to six years. The penalty shall be increased if the accused blames someone of a crime for which the law prescribes a penalty of imprisonment exceeding a maximum of ten years, or another more serious penalty. The imprisonment shall be from four to twelve years if the act results in a prison sentence exceeding five years, from six to twenty years if the act results in a life sentence.

The mens rea of calunnia requires awareness and a willingness to blame someone of a crime that the accused knows is innocent.

Calunnia should be distinguished from criminal slander (ingiuria) and criminal libel (diffamazione) which relate to offences against personal honour in the Italian Penal Code.

== Protection of legal interests ==
Traditionally, the crime of calunnia is said to protect a plurality of legal interests. The major protected legal interests are, at the same time, both the proper administration of justice and personal honour, and also possibly the personal freedom of the falsely accused. Historically, the Italian legal system has treated calunnia as detrimental to the interests of the State and the correct administration of justice. This is evidenced through the crime of calunnia being included among other crimes against the administration of justice in the Italian Penal Code, unlike in the French Penal Code or Belgian Penal Code, which place the equivalent of calunnia with crimes against honour.
