= Lucius Cornelius Cinna (praetor 44 BC) =

1st century BC Roman politician

- Born: c. 100 BC
- Died: after 44 BC
- Office: Praetor (44 BC)
- Children: 3
- Relatives: Lucius Cornelius Cinna (father); Annia (presumably mother); Cornelia, wife of Caesar (sister); Cornelia, wife of Gnaeus Domitius Ahenobarbus (died 81 BC) (sister)

Lucius Cornelius Cinna (born c. 100-95 BC – died sometime after 44 BC) was a politician in the Roman Republic. He came from a noble family which had gained prominence during the civil wars of the 80s BC, but lost their political rights after the victory of Lucius Cornelius Sulla, who would subsequently target his opponents and their families through proscriptions and other legal reforms. Cinna sought better fortune for himself by joining the failed rebellions of Marcus Aemilius Lepidus in 78 BC, and Quintus Sertorius in the 70s BC. Cinna was later recalled to Rome and granted amnesty with the support of his brother-in-law, Julius Caesar. Cinna would remain prohibited from holding public office under Sulla's constitutional reforms, which targeted the descendants of his enemies. This restriction would later be lifted in 49 BC, following Caesar's crossing of the Rubicon.

Cinna held the senior office of praetor during Caesar's dictatorship, but nonetheless harbored republican sympathies and disapproved of Caesar's politics. Cinna gave a public speech approving of Caesar's assassination in 44, for which he was twice almost lynched by an angry mob of the dictator's supporters, while someone mistaken for him was lynched. Cinna was proscribed by the Second Triumvirate and died during the subsequent civil wars. He married Pompeia, daughter of Caesar's old enemy Pompey, and had issue by her.

== Life ==
Lucius Cornelius Cinna was one of three known children and the only son of the Roman statesman Lucius Cornelius Cinna and presumably his wife Annia. The younger Cinna was probably born around 100 BC, and no later than 95. In 87, his father became consul, won a civil war, becoming a dominant figure in Rome until 84, when he died in an army mutiny. During this period, the younger Cinna's sister Cornelia married the future dictator Julius Caesar. In 82, his late father's enemy, Sulla, became dictator, and passed a law debarring the descendants of his opponents, including the younger Cinna, from holding public office.

In 78 BC, Cinna joined the failed rebellion of Marcus Aemilius Lepidus in an attempt to undo the constitutional settlement of Sulla. After the defeat and death of Lepidus, Cinna joined other loyalists (presumably in the company of Marcus Perperna) to join another rebel, Sertorius, one of his father's old allies, in Hispania. When Sertorius's rebellion collapsed in the late 70s, Cinna was granted amnesty and allowed to return to Rome, by means of a motion introduced by a tribune, Plautius, and supported by his brother-in-law, Caesar. Cinna was, however, still unable to pursue a public career until Sulla's constitutional reforms were repealed in 49 BC, when Caesar crossed the Rubicon and seized Rome. During Caesar's dictatorship, Cinna was promoted to the office of praetor in 44 BC – the year of the dictator's assassination.

Despite his kinship to Caesar and the favor shown to him by the dictator, Cinna developed republican and anti-Caesarian political sympathies. He married Pompeia, daughter of Caesar's old adversary Pompey, shortly after her first husband's death in 46 BC. Although he did not join the conspiracy against Caesar on the Ides of March, Cinna, in the aftermath of the deed, advanced unexpectedly into the Forum – the first of all magistrates to speak about the event – and delivered a violent harangue against the late dictator. Cinna removed his own praetor's robe as it being the gift of a tyrant, praised Caesar's killers as tyrannicides, argued that the deed was in accord with ancestral custom, and demanded public honors for the assassins. The speech generated a hostile reaction from the crowd, forcing Brutus, Cassius and the other conspirators to retreat to the Capitoline Hill.

On 17 March, Cinna went to the temple of Tellus for the first Senate meeting after the assassination – now cautiously wearing his praetorian robe once again – but his earlier speech had made a deep impression, and he was recognized en route by a hostile crowd, which included veterans of Caesar. The furious mob pelted Cinna with stones and chased him to a house, where they would have burnt him to death had Lepidus, Caesar's former deputy, not intervened with his soldiers. Popular hostility towards him came to a head when, at the dictator's funeral on 20 March, a tribune of the plebs, Helvius Cinna, was torn to pieces by an enraged mob after they mistook him for the praetor Cornelius Cinna, on account of their identical surnames. As praetor, Cornelius Cinna procured the recall of the tribunes Lucius Caesetius Flavus and Gaius Epidius Marullus, whom Caesar had exiled, and, on 28 November, he refused a provincial governorship assigned to him by the consul Marc Antony. Cinna was apparently proscribed and his wealth confiscated by the Second Triumvirate, and died in unspecified circumstances during the subsequent civil wars.

By Pompeia, Cinna had a son, Gnaeus Cornelius Cinna Magnus, and a daughter, Magna, who married a Scribonius Libo. Presumed to be his son from an earlier marriage is another Lucius Cornelius Cinna, who stands on the record as having been quaestor in 44 BC, a frater Arvalis in 21, and possibly suffect consul in 32. Sumner and Syme proposed that, since the praetor of 44 would have been old at the time of the marriage, the frater Arvalis should be identified as Pompeia's husband instead, and as the praetor's son, but others have rejected this, based on the statement by Seneca that the father of Gnaeus Cornelius Cinna Magnus died during the civil wars.

== See also ==
- List of ancient Romans
