= Quintus Ligarius =

Quintus Ligarius (died c. 43 BC) was one of the assassins of Julius Caesar. He had been accused of treason for having opposed Caesar in the civil war in Africa, but was defended so eloquently by Cicero that he was pardoned and allowed to return to Rome. He later conspired with Marcus Junius Brutus, with whom he assassinated Julius Caesar on 15 March 44 BC.

== Civil war ==
Quintus Ligarius was a member of an equestrian Sabine family. He had gone to Africa as legate to the provincial governor Gaius Considius Longus, who when returning to Rome left him in command. After Pompey was defeated by Caesar at the Battle of Pharsalus, Pompey's ally Publius Attius Varus went to Africa and there continued the war. Ligarius became one of his assistants. He was present at the Battle of Thapsus. After the defeat, he was captured at Hadrumetum. He was spared by Caesar, but he was not allowed back into Italy.

== Trial ==
Ligarius' brothers asked Cicero to intercede on behalf of their exiled relative. Cicero secured a meeting with Caesar, who seemed receptive, but then an order was made to arrest Ligarius on charges that are no longer clear, but appear to have involved the claim that he conspired with King Juba I. The prosecution seems to have emerged from a grudge held by Quintus Aelius Tubero over an incident when Ligarius denied Tubero's family help when he was in charge of Africa.

At the trial, Cicero gave an impassioned speech in Ligarius' defence, known as the Pro Ligario. He ignored the actual charges, but instead made an emotional appeal for reconciliation and clemency, warning of the dangers of vendettas. According to Plutarch, "Caesar was emotionally overcome, his body shook, and some documents fell from his hand. And so under compulsion he acquitted Ligarius".

== Conspirator ==
The acquittal allowed Ligarius to return to Rome. Plutarch writes that he did not forgive Caesar for pardoning him. This hatred, and his friendship with other Liberators, caused him to join the assassination plot. According to Plutarch, Ligarius was ill in bed when he was visited by Marcus Brutus. He told Brutus that he would be made well again by helping him with his plot. Plutarch refers to him as "Caius Ligarius" in the passage, but the context strongly implies that he is referring to the same person who was tried and acquitted.

Although no author specifically identifies Ligarius as a victim of the proscriptions of the Second Triumvirate in 43 BC, there is little doubt he was one of the victims, as Cicero mentions that there were three brothers, and Appian mentions three brothers with this name who perished in the proscriptions.

== In Shakespeare ==
Ligarius is a character in William Shakespeare's tragedy Julius Caesar. He is called "Caius Ligarius", which is the name used by Plutarch when describing the episode of his sickness.

He is depicted, following Plutarch, as a sickly man, though strong in mind, with a grudge against Caesar for reprimanding him for admiring Pompey. His absolute trust in Brutus sets up the role of Brutus as a moral model whose leadership is necessary to bring others on board. Though part of the conspiracy, he does not participate in the assassination itself.
