= Titinius (centurion) =

Roman centurion (died 42 BC)

Titinius (died 42 BC) was an ancient Roman soldier. He was a centurion in the army of Gaius Cassius Longinus at the Battle of Philippi. After the battle was over, he was sent by Cassius to find out what had happened to the legions commanded by Marcus Junius Brutus; when he did not return as quickly as Cassius had expected, Cassius believed that they had been defeated and so killed himself. On returning to find Cassius dead, Titinius killed himself. Titinius appears as a character in the play Julius Caesar by William Shakespeare.
