= Lucius Caesetius Flavus =

Roman politician

Lucius Caesetius Flavus (fl. 1st century BC) was a Roman politician and tribune of the people (tribunus plebis). He is best known for his involvement in the diadem incident just before the assassination of Julius Caesar.

As Caesar's power grew, someone placed a diadem on the statue of Caesar on the Rostra, implying he was now King. Two of the tribunes, Flavus and Gaius Epidius Marullus, removed it. Soon afterward, Flavus and Marcellus had citizens arrested after they called out the title Rex to Caesar as he passed by on the streets of Rome. Now seeing his supporters threatened, Caesar acted harshly. He ordered those arrested to be released, and instead took the tribunes before the Senate and had them stripped of their positions as tribunes and senators.

Plutarch told that as the tribunes arrested people for saluting Caesar as King, crowds applauded, calling them Brutuses—not after Marcus Junius Brutus, not yet the assassin of Caesar, but after Lucius Junius Brutus, a possibly apocryphal figure who had led a coup against the despotic last king, Tarquin the Proud, thereby founding the Roman Republic. He also notes that Caesar insulted the tribunes in a speech as he removed them from office, "and in speaking against them he insulted the people at the same time".

He appears as the tribune Flavius in Shakespeare's biographical play Julius Caesar. Here Shakespeare has confounded the cognomen Flavus with the gentile name Flavius, which is derived from the surname. As in history, Flavius and his fellow tribune (here named "Marullus" or "Murellus") are punished for removing decorations from statues of Caesar during a parade. Their parts in the play are meant to quiet down the audience.

== See also ==
- Caesetia gens
- Gaius Epidius Marullus
