= Lucius Tillius Cimber =

Roman senator and conspirator in Caesar's assassination

Lucius Tillius Cimber (d. 42 BC?) was a Roman senator and one of the key conspirators in the assassination of Julius Caesar on the Ides of March, 44 BC. Though previously favored by Caesar, Cimber played a pivotal role in initiating the attack by grabbing Caesar's toga—an agreed-upon signal for the conspirators to strike.

== Early life and career ==
Little is known of Cimber's early life, but he had risen to political prominence by the final years of the Roman Republic. He served as Praetor in 45 BCE and was later appointed governor of Bithynia and Pontus, a wealthy province in Asia Minor, for 44 BCE. These positions reflect his strong political standing under Caesar.

Cimber is thought to have served with Caesar in Gaul or during the civil war, though sources are unclear. According to Cicero, Cimber was personally grateful to Caesar for his kindnesses.

== Role in Caesar's assassination ==
Cimber joined the conspiracy to assassinate Caesar, led by Marcus Junius Brutus and Gaius Cassius Longinus. According to ancient sources, he was responsible for initiating the attack. On March 15, 44 BCE, during a Senate meeting in the Theatre of Pompey, he presented a petition requesting the recall of his exiled brother. When Caesar attempted to dismiss him, Cimber grabbed Caesar's toga, which prevented him from standing. This act signaled the other conspirators, beginning with Publius Servilius Casca, to begin the assault.

Plutarch and Appian confirm this role, and Suetonius reports Caesar's last coherent words may have been "Why, this is violence!" as he reacted to Cimber's action. Though Cimber himself did not strike Caesar, his action was critical to the plan's success.

== Character and reputation ==
According to Seneca the Younger, Cimber had a reputation as a heavy drinker and brawler, though he was still trusted with major responsibilities. Despite his coarse manner, Caesar placed considerable trust in him. Historian Barry Strauss describes Cimber as a rough-edged but reliable figure within Caesar's circle.

Some suggest Cimber's motivation in joining the conspiracy was partly personal. Caesar had reportedly refused to allow the return of Cimber's exiled brother, which may have contributed to his disillusionment.

== Aftermath and death ==
After Caesar's assassination, Cimber aligned with the Republican faction led by Brutus and Cassius. He continued to support their cause, using his authority in the East. He likely died in 42 BCE at the Battle of Philippi, where the Republicans were defeated by forces loyal to Mark Antony and Octavian (the future Augustus).

== Legacy ==
While not as prominent as Brutus or Cassius, Cimber played a vital role in the execution of the plot. His act of grabbing Caesar's toga has become a key moment in accounts of the Ides of March. He appears occasionally in dramatizations and historical fiction as the "signal man" of the conspiracy.
