= Gaius Epidius Marullus =

Roman tribune (fl. 44 BCE)

Gaius Epidius Marullus (fl. 44 BCE) was a Roman tribune most famous for the diadem incident.

The fear of Caesar becoming an autocrat, thus ending the Roman Republic, grew stronger when someone placed a diadem on the statue of Caesar on the Rostra. The tribunes, Gaius Epidius Marullus and Lucius Caesetius Flavus, removed the diadem. Not long after the incident with the diadem, the same two tribunes had citizens arrested after they called out the title Rex to Caesar as he passed by on the streets of Rome. Now seeing his supporters threatened, Caesar acted harshly. He ordered those arrested to be released, and instead took the tribunes before the Senate and had them stripped of their positions. Caesar had originally used the sanctity of the tribunes as one reason for the start of the civil war between him and Pompey, but now revoked their power for his own gain.

== See also ==
- Epidia gens
- Julius Caesar (play), William Shakespeare
- Lucius Caesetius Flavus
