= Titus Andronicus =

Play by Shakespeare

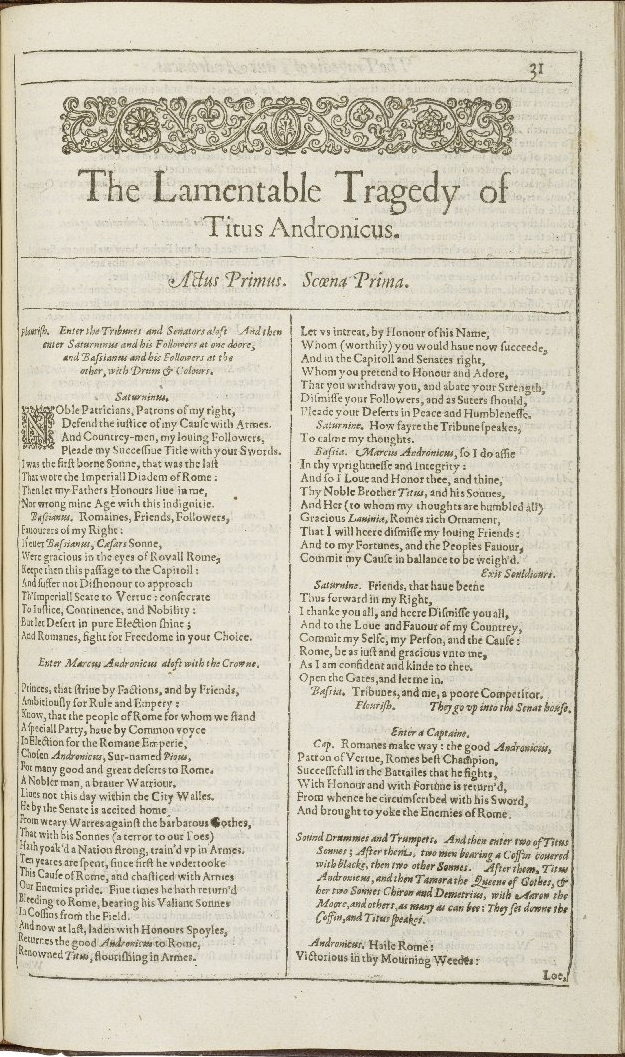
First page of The Lamentable Tragedy of Titus Andronicus from the First Folio, published in 1623

The Lamentable Tragedy of Titus Andronicus (/ˌtaɪtəs ænˈdrɒnɪkəs/), often shortened to Titus Andronicus, is a tragedy by William Shakespeare, believed to have been written between 1588 and 1593. It is thought to be Shakespeare's first tragedy and is often seen as his attempt to emulate the violent and bloody revenge plays of his contemporaries, which were extremely popular with audiences throughout the 16th century.

Titus, a general in the Roman army, presents Tamora, Queen of the Goths, as a slave to the new Roman emperor, Saturninus. Saturninus takes her as his wife. From this position, Tamora vows revenge against Titus for killing her son. Titus and his family retaliate, leading to a cycle of violence.

Titus Andronicus was initially very popular, but by the later 17th century it was not well esteemed. The Victorian era disapproved of it, largely because of its graphic violence. Its reputation began to improve around the middle of the 20th century, but it is still one of Shakespeare's least respected plays.

== Characters ==
- Titus Andronicus – renowned Roman general who lost 21 sons
- Lucius – Titus's eldest living son
- Quintus – Titus's son
- Martius – Titus's son
- Mutius – Titus's son
- Young Lucius – Lucius's son and Titus's grandson
- Lavinia – Titus's daughter
- Marcus Andronicus – Titus's brother and tribune to the people of Rome
- Publius – Marcus's son
- Saturninus – Son of the late Emperor of Rome; afterwards declared Emperor
- Bassianus – Saturninus's brother; in love with Lavinia
- Sempronius, Caius and Valentine – Titus's kinsmen
- Æmilius – Roman noble
- Tamora – Queen of the Goths; afterwards Empress of Rome
- Demetrius – Tamora's son
- Chiron – Tamora's son
- Alarbus – Tamora's son (non-speaking role)
- Aaron – a Moor; involved in a romantic relationship with Tamora
- Nurse
- Clown
- Messenger
- Roman Captain
- First Goth
- Second Goth
- Senators, Tribunes, Soldiers, Plebeians, Goths etc.

== Plot ==
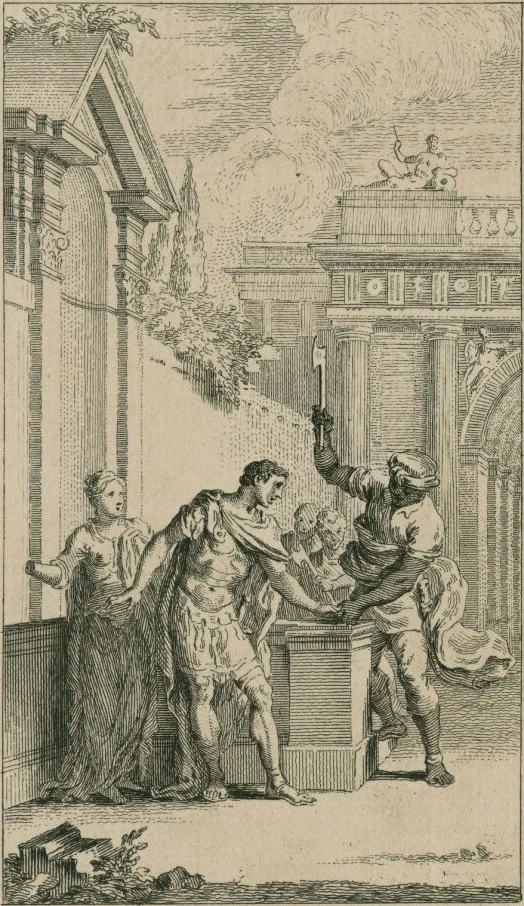
Gravelot illustration of Aaron cutting off Titus's hand in Act 3, Scene 1; engraved by Gerard Van der Gucht (1740)

Shortly after the death of the Roman emperor, his two sons, Saturninus and Bassianus, quarrel over who will succeed him. Their conflict seems set to boil over into violence until a tribune, Marcus Andronicus, announces that the people's choice for the new emperor is his brother, Titus, who will shortly return to Rome from a victorious ten-year campaign against the Goths. Titus arrives to much fanfare, bearing with him as prisoners Tamora, Queen of the Goths; her three sons Alarbus, Chiron, and Demetrius; and her secret lover, Aaron the Moor. Despite Tamora's desperate pleas, Titus sacrifices her eldest son, Alarbus, to avenge the deaths of twenty-one of his own sons during the war. Distraught, Tamora and her two surviving sons vow to obtain revenge on Titus and his family.

Meanwhile, Titus refuses the offer of the throne, arguing that he is not fit to rule and instead supporting the claim of Saturninus, who then is duly elected. Saturninus tells Titus that for his first act as emperor, he will marry Titus's daughter Lavinia. Titus agrees, although Lavinia is already betrothed to Saturninus's brother, Bassianus, who refuses to give her up. Titus's sons tell Titus that Bassianus is in the right under Roman law, but Titus refuses to listen, accusing them all of treason. A scuffle breaks out, during which Titus kills his own son, Mutius. Saturninus then denounces the Andronici family for their effrontery and shocks Titus by marrying Tamora. Putting into motion her plan for revenge, Tamora advises Saturninus to pardon Bassianus and the Andronici family, which he reluctantly does.

During a royal hunt the following day, Aaron persuades Demetrius and Chiron to kill Bassianus so that they may rape Lavinia. They do so, throwing Bassianus's body into a pit and dragging Lavinia deep into the forest before violently raping her. To keep her from revealing what has happened, they cut out her tongue and cut off her hands. Meanwhile, Aaron writes a forged letter, which frames Titus's sons Martius and Quintus for the murder of Bassianus. Horrified at the death of his brother, Saturninus arrests Martius and Quintus and sentences them to death.

Some time later, Marcus discovers the mutilated Lavinia and takes her to her father, who is still shocked at the accusations levelled at his sons, and upon seeing Lavinia, he is overcome with grief. Aaron then visits Titus and falsely tells him that Saturninus will spare Martius and Quintus if either Titus, Marcus, or Titus's remaining son, Lucius, cuts off one of their hands and sends it to him. Though Marcus and Lucius are willing, Titus has his own left hand cut off by Aaron and sends it to the emperor. However, a messenger brings back Martius's and Quintus's severed heads, along with Titus's own severed hand. Desperate for revenge, Titus orders Lucius to flee Rome and raise an army among their conquered enemy, the Goths.

Later, Lavinia writes the names of her attackers in the dirt, using a stick held with her mouth and between her arms. Meanwhile, Aaron is informed that Tamora has secretly given birth to a mixed-race baby, fathered by Aaron, which will draw Saturninus's wrath. Though Tamora wants the baby killed, Aaron kills the nurse to keep the child's race a secret and flees to raise his son among the Goths. Thereafter, Lucius, marching on Rome with an army, captures Aaron and threatens to hang the infant. In order to save the baby, Aaron reveals the entire revenge plot to Lucius.

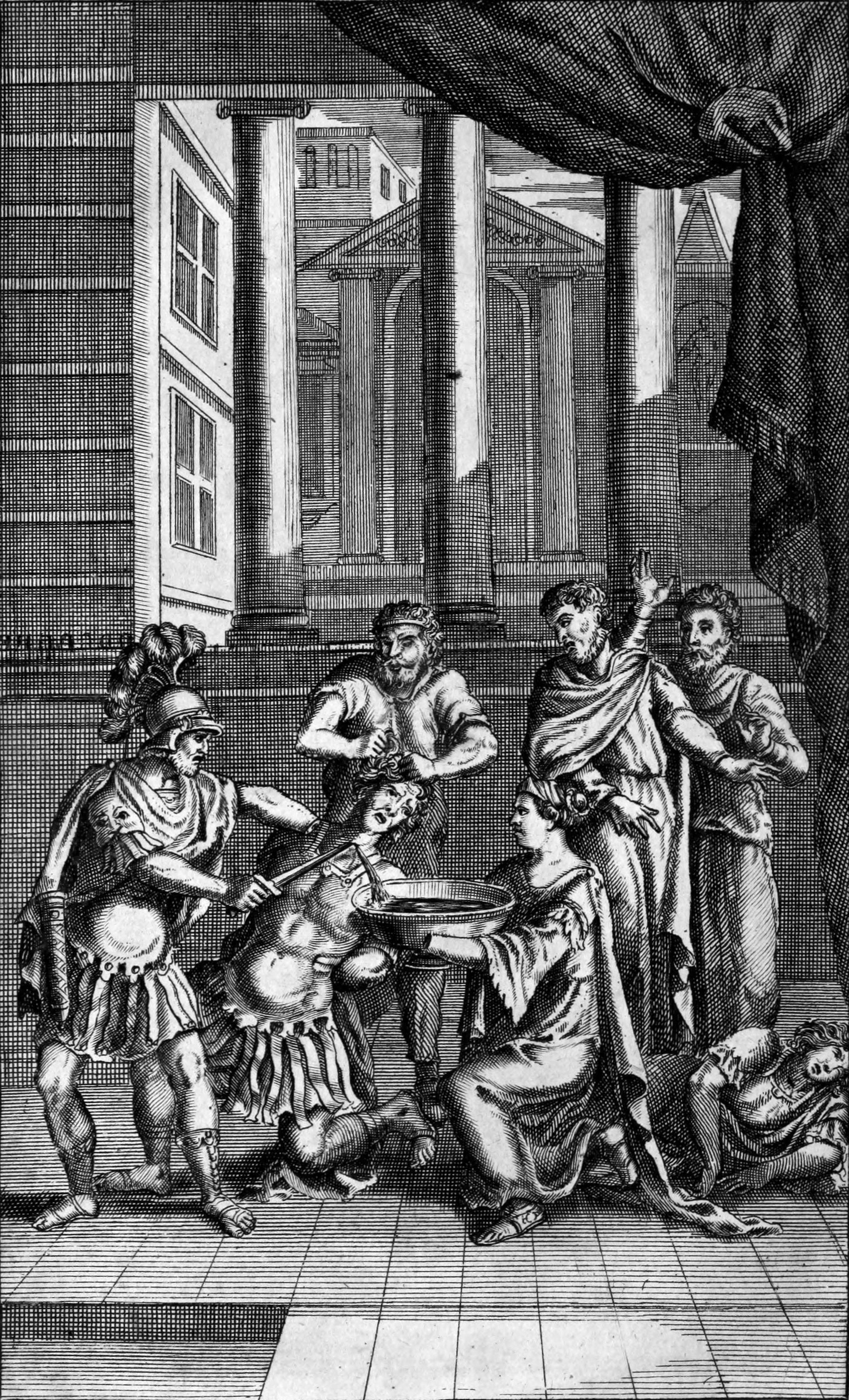
Illustration of the death of Chiron and Demetrius from Act 5, Scene 2; from The Works of Mr. William Shakespeare (1709), edited by Nicholas Rowe

Back in Rome, Titus's behaviour suggests he might be deranged. Convinced of Titus's madness, Tamora, Demetrius, and Chiron (dressed as the spirits of Revenge, Murder, and Rape, respectively) approach Titus in order to persuade him to have Lucius remove his troops from Rome. Tamora (as Revenge) tells Titus that she will grant him revenge on all of his enemies if he convinces Lucius to postpone the imminent attack on Rome. Titus agrees and sends Marcus to invite Lucius to a reconciliatory feast. Revenge then offers to invite the Emperor and Tamora as well, and is about to leave when Titus insists that Rape and Murder stay with him. When Tamora is gone, Titus has Chiron and Demetrius restrained, cuts their throats, and drains their blood into a basin held by Lavinia. Titus tells Lavinia that he will "play the cook", grind the bones of Demetrius and Chiron into powder, and bake their heads into two pies, which he will serve to their mother.

The next day, during the feast at his house, Titus asks Saturninus if a father should kill his daughter when she has been raped. When Saturninus answers that he should, Titus kills Lavinia and tells Saturninus of the rape. When the Emperor calls for Chiron and Demetrius, Titus reveals that they were baked in the pies Tamora has already been eating. Titus then kills Tamora and is immediately killed by Saturninus, who is subsequently killed by Lucius to avenge his father's death. Lucius is then proclaimed Emperor. He orders that Titus and Lavinia be laid in their family tomb, that Saturninus be given a state burial, that Tamora's body be thrown to the wild beasts outside the city, and that Aaron be hanged. Aaron, however, is unrepentant to the end, regretting only that he did not do more evil in his life. Lucius decides Aaron deserves to be buried chest-deep as punishment and left to die of thirst and starvation, and Aaron is taken away to be punished thus.

== Setting and sources ==
=== Setting ===
The story of Titus Andronicus is fictional, not historical, unlike Shakespeare's other Roman plays, Julius Caesar, Antony and Cleopatra, and Coriolanus, all of which are based on real historical events and people (or, in the case of Coriolanus, believed to be historical by late Romans, as well as in Shakespeare's time). Even the time in which Titus is set may not be based on a real historical period. According to the prose version of the play (see below), the events are "set in the time of Theodosius", who ruled from 379 to 395. On the other hand, the general setting appears to be what Clifford Huffman describes as "late-Imperial Christian Rome", possibly during the reign of Justinian I (527–565). Also favouring a later date, Grace Starry West argues,

the Rome of Titus Andronicus is Rome after Brutus, after Caesar, and after Ovid. We know it is a later Rome because the emperor is routinely called Caesar; because the characters are constantly alluding to Tarquin, Lucretia, and Brutus, suggesting that they learned about Brutus's new founding of Rome from the same literary sources we do, Livy and Plutarch.

Others are less certain of a specific setting, however. For example, Jonathan Bate has pointed out that the play begins with Titus returning from a successful ten-year campaign against the Goths, as if at the height of the Roman Empire, but ends with Goths invading Rome, as if at its death. Similarly, T. J. B. Spencer argues that

the play does not assume a political situation known to Roman history; it is, rather a summary of Roman politics. It is not so much that any particular set of political institutions is assumed in Titus, but rather that it includes all the political institutions that Rome ever had.

=== Sources ===
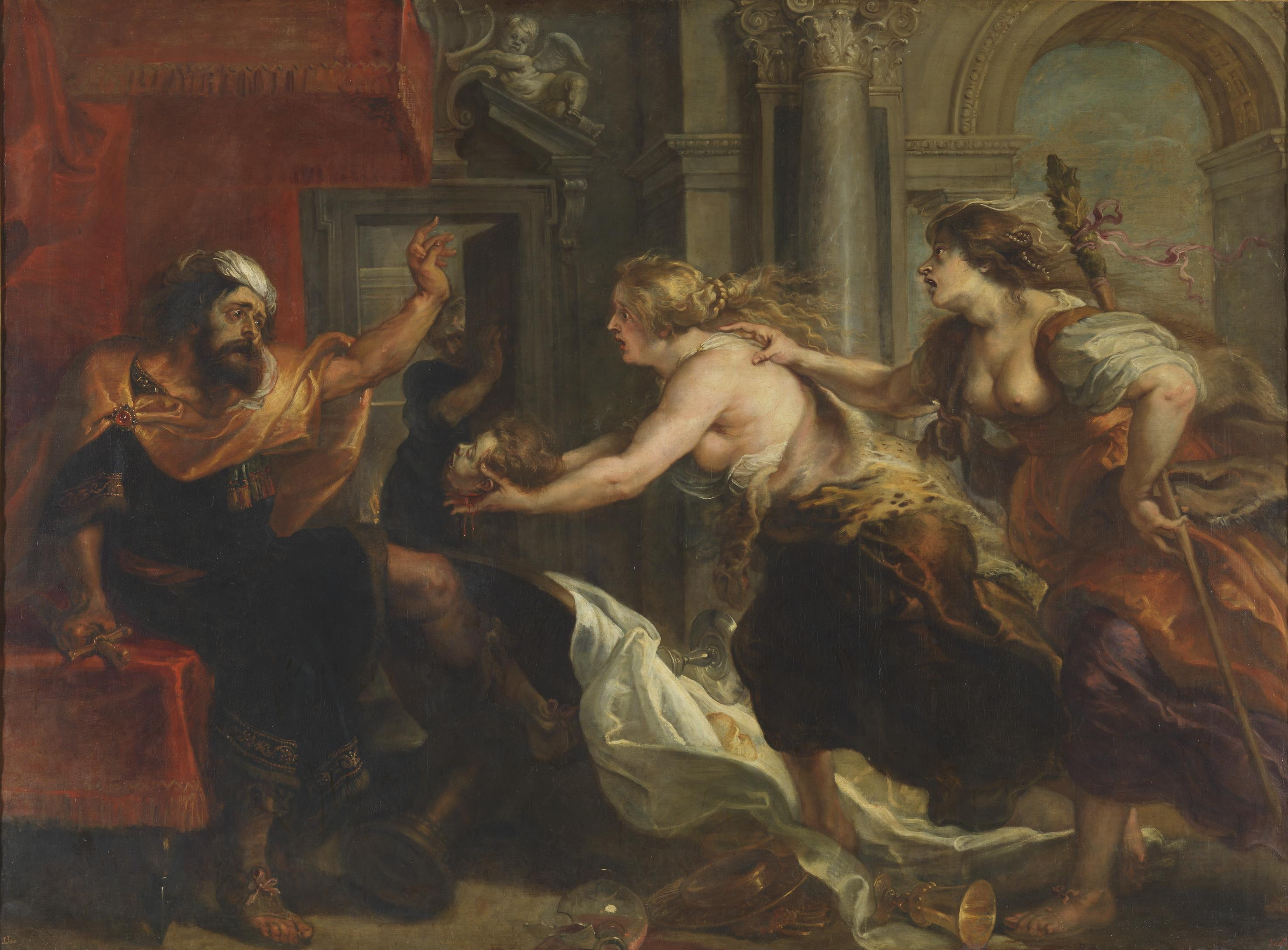
Tereus Confronted with the Head of his Son Itylus (1637) by Peter Paul Rubens

In his efforts to fashion general history into a specific fictional story, Shakespeare may have consulted the Gesta Romanorum, a well known thirteenth-century collection of tales, legends, myths, and anecdotes written in Latin, which took figures and events from history and spun fictional tales around them. In Shakespeare's lifetime, a writer known for doing likewise was Matteo Bandello, who based his work on that of writers such as Giovanni Boccaccio and Geoffrey Chaucer, and who could have served as an indirect source for Shakespeare. So, too, could the first major English author to write in this style, William Painter, who borrowed from, amongst others, Herodotus, Plutarch, Aulus Gellius, Claudius Aelianus, Livy, Tacitus, Giovanni Battista Giraldi, and Bandello himself. However, it is also possible to determine more specific sources for the play. The primary source for the rape and mutilation of Lavinia, as well as Titus's subsequent revenge, is Ovid's Metamorphoses (c. AD 8), which is featured in the play itself when Lavinia uses it to help explain to Titus and Marcus what happened to her.

In the sixth book of Metamorphoses, Ovid tells the story of the rape of Philomela, daughter of Pandion I, King of Athens. Despite ill omens, Philomela's sister, Procne, marries Tereus of Thrace and has a son for him, Itys. After five years in Thrace, Procne yearns to see her sister again, so she persuades Tereus to travel to Athens and accompany Philomela back to Thrace. Tereus does so, but he soon begins to lust after Philomela. When she refuses his advances, he drags her into a forest and rapes her. He then cuts out her tongue to prevent her from telling anyone of the incident and returns to Procne, telling her that Philomela is dead. However, Philomela weaves a tapestry, in which she names Tereus as her assailant, and has it sent to Procne. The sisters meet in the forest and together plot their revenge. They kill Itys and cook his body in a pie, which Procne then serves to Tereus. During the meal, Philomela reveals herself, showing Itys' head to Tereus and telling him what they have done. For the scene where Lavinia reveals her rapists by writing in the sand, Shakespeare may have used a story from the first book of Metamorphoses; the tale of the rape of Io by Zeus, where, to prevent her from divulging the story, he turns her into a cow. Upon encountering her father, she attempts to tell him who she is but is unable to do so until she thinks to scratch her name in the dirt using her hoof.

Titus's revenge may also have been influenced by Seneca's play Thyestes, written in the first century AD. In the myth of Thyestes, which is the basis for Seneca's play, Thyestes, son of Pelops, King of Pisa, who, along with his brother Atreus, was exiled by Pelops for the murder of their half-brother, Chrysippus. They take up refuge in Mycenae and soon ascend to co-inhabit the throne. However, each becomes jealous of the other, and Thyestes tricks Atreus into electing him as the sole king. Determined to re-attain the throne, Atreus enlists the aid of Zeus and Hermes, and has Thyestes banished from Mycenae. Atreus subsequently discovers that his wife, Aerope, had been having an affair with Thyestes, and he vows revenge. He asks Thyestes to return to Mycenae with his family, telling him that all past animosities are forgotten. However, when Thyestes returns, Atreus secretly kills Thyestes's sons. He cuts off their hands and heads, and cooks the rest of their bodies in a pie. At a reconciliatory feast, Atreus serves Thyestes the pie in which his sons have been baked. As Thyestes finishes his meal, Atreus produces the hands and heads, revealing to the horrified Thyestes what he has done.

Another specific source for the final scene is discernible when Titus asks Saturninus if a father should kill his daughter when she has been raped. This is a reference to the story of Verginia from Livy's Ab urbe condita (c. 26 BC). Around 451 BC, a decemvir of the Roman Republic, Appius Claudius Crassus, begins to lust after Verginia, a plebeian girl betrothed to a former tribune, Lucius Icilius. She rejects Claudius's advances, enraging him, and he has her abducted. However, both Icilius and Verginia's father, famed centurion Lucius Verginius, are respected figures and Claudius is forced to legally defend his right to hold Verginia. At the Forum, Claudius threatens the assembly with violence, and Verginius's supporters flee. Seeing that defeat is imminent, Verginius asks Claudius if he may speak to his daughter alone, to which Claudius agrees. However, Verginius stabs Verginia, determining that her death is the only way he can secure her freedom.

For the scene where Aaron tricks Titus into cutting off one of his hands, the primary source was probably an unnamed popular tale about a Moor's vengeance, published in various languages throughout the sixteenth century (an English version entered into the Stationers' Register in 1569 has not survived). In the story, a married nobleman with two children chastises his Moorish servant, who vows revenge. The servant goes to the moated tower where the man's wife and children live, and rapes the wife. Her screams bring her husband, but the Moor pulls up the drawbridge before the nobleman can gain entry. The Moor then kills both children on the battlements in full view of the man. The nobleman pleads with the Moor that he will do anything to save his wife, and the Moor demands he cut off his nose. The man does so, but the Moor kills the wife anyway, and the nobleman dies of shock. The Moor then flings himself from the battlements to avoid punishment.

Shakespeare also drew on various sources for the names of many of his characters. For example, Titus could have been named after the Emperor Titus Flavius Vespasianus, who ruled Rome from 79 to 81. Jonathan Bate, Geoffrey Bullough and some other scholars have speculated that the name 'Andronicus' could have come from Andronicus Comnenus, Byzantine emperor from 1183 to 1185. Like Titus Andronicus, Andronicus Comnenus was a violent ruler who was ultimately overthrown and brutally killed by his own people. Andronicus Comnenus was also known to shoot arrows with messages attached, another trait that is shared with Titus Andronicus. In addition, both Andronicus Comnenus and Titus Andronicus lost their right hand shortly before their death. Others have speculated that Shakespeare took the name from the story "Andronicus and the lion" in Antonio de Guevara's Epistolas familiares. That story involves a sadistic emperor named Titus who amused himself by throwing slaves to wild animals and watching them be slaughtered. However, when a slave called Andronicus is thrown to a lion, the lion lies down and embraces the man. The emperor demands to know what has happened, and Andronicus explains that he had once helped the lion by removing a thorn from its foot. Bate speculates that this story, with one character called Titus and another called Andronicus, could be why several contemporary references to the play are in the form Titus & Ondronicus.

Geoffrey Bullough argues that Lucius's character arc (estrangement from his father, followed by banishment, followed by a glorious return to avenge his family honour) was probably based on Plutarch's Life of Coriolanus. As for Lucius's name, Frances Yates speculates that he may be named after Saint Lucius, who introduced Christianity into Britain. On the other hand, Jonathan Bate hypothesises that Lucius could be named after Lucius Junius Brutus, founder of the Roman Republic, arguing that "the man who led the people in their uprising was Lucius Junius Brutus. This is the role that Lucius fulfills in the play."

The name of Lavinia was probably taken from the mythological figure of Lavinia, daughter of Latinus, King of Latium, who, in Virgil's Aeneid, courts Aeneas as he attempts to settle his people in Latium. A. C. Hamilton speculates that the name of Tamora could have been based upon the historical figure of Tomyris, a violent and uncompromising queen of the ancient Massagetae. Eugene M. Waith suggests that the name of Tamora's son, Alarbus, could have come from George Puttenham's The Arte of English Poesie (1589), which contains the line "the Roman prince did daunt/Wild Africans and the lawless Alarbes." G. K. Hunter has suggested Shakespeare may have taken Saturninus's name from Herodian's History of the Empire from the Death of Marcus, which features a jealous and violent tribune named Saturninus. On the other hand, Waith speculates that Shakespeare may have been thinking of an astrological theory which he could have seen in Guy Marchant's The Kalendayr of the shyppars (1503), which states that Saturnine men (i.e. men born under the influence of Saturn) are "false, envious and malicious".

Shakespeare most likely took the names of Caius, Demetrius, Marcus, Martius, Quintus, Æmilius, and Sempronius from Plutarch's Life of Scipio Africanus. Bassianus's name probably came from Lucius Septimius Bassianus, better known as Caracalla, who, like Bassianus in the play, fights with his brother over succession, one appealing to primogeniture and the other to popularity.

=== Ballad, prose history, and source debate ===
Any discussion of the sources of Titus Andronicus is complicated by the existence of two other versions of the story: a prose history and a ballad which are both anonymous and undated. Ultimately, there is no clear critical consensus on the issue of the order in which the play, prose, and ballad were written, with the only tentative agreement being that at the latest, all three were probably in existence by 1594.

The first definite reference to the ballad "Titus Andronicus' Complaint" is an entry in the Stationers' Register by the printer John Danter on 6 February 1594, where the entry "A booke intitled a Noble Roman Historye of Tytus Andronicus" is immediately followed by "Entred also vnto[sic] him, the ballad thereof". The earliest surviving copy of the ballad is in Richard Johnson's The Golden Garland of Princely Pleasures and Delicate Delights (1620), but the date of its composition is unknown.

The prose was first published in chapbook form some time between 1736–1764 by Cluer Dicey under the title The History of Titus Andronicus, the Renowned Roman General (the ballad was also included in the chapbook), however it is believed to be much older than that. The copyright records from the Stationers' Register in Shakespeare's own lifetime provide some tenuous evidence regarding the dating of the prose. On 19 April 1602, the publisher Thomas Millington sold his share in the copyright of "A booke intitled a Noble Roman Historye of Tytus Andronicus" (which Danter had initially entered into the Register in 1594) to Thomas Pavier. The orthodox belief is that this entry refers to the play.

The next version of the play to be published was for Edward White, in 1611, printed by Edward Allde, thus prompting the question of why Pavier never published the play, despite having owned the copyright for nine years. J.Q. Adams believes that the original Danter entry in 1594 is not a reference to the play but instead to the prose version, and that the subsequent transferrals of copyright relate to the prose, not the play, explaining why the play was never published by Pavier. Similarly, Greg believes that all copyright to the play lapsed upon Danter's death in 1600, hence the 1602 transferral from Millington to Pavier was illegitimate unless it refers to something other than the play; i.e. the prose. Both scholars conclude that the evidence seems to imply the prose existed by early 1594 at the latest. (Note: For an extensive examination of the complex copyright history of the play and prose, see Adams & Greg (1936), vol. 1)

However, even if the prose version existed in 1594, there is no solid evidence to suggest the order in which the play, ballad, and prose were written, and which served as source for which. Traditionally, the prose has been seen as the original, with the play derived from it, and the ballad derived from both play and prose. Adams, for example, firmly believed in this order (prose-play-ballad) as did John Dover Wilson and Geoffrey Bullough. This theory is by no means universally accepted however. For example, R.M. Sargent agrees with Adams and Bullough that the prose was the source of the play, but he argues that the poem was also a source of the play (prose-ballad-play).

Marco Mincoff rejects both theories, arguing instead that the play came first, and served as a source for both the ballad and the prose (play-ballad-prose). G.H. Metz felt that Mincoff was incorrect and reasserted the primacy of the prose-play-ballad sequence. G.K. Hunter however, believes that Adams, Dover Wilson, Bullough, Sargent, Mincoff, and Metz were all wrong, and the play was the source for the prose, with both serving as sources for the ballad (play-prose-ballad). In his 1984 edition of the play for The Oxford Shakespeare, E.M. Waith rejects Hunter's theory and supports the original prose-play-ballad sequence.

On the other hand, Jonathan Bate favours Mincoff's theory of play-ballad-prose, in his 1995 edition for the Arden Shakespeare (3rd series). In the introduction to the 2001 edition of the play for the Penguin Shakespeare (edited by Sonia Massai), Jacques Berthoud agrees with Waith and settles on the initial prose-play-ballad sequence. In his 2006 revised edition for the New Cambridge Shakespeare, Alan Hughes also argues for the original prose-play-ballad hypothesis, but proposes that the source for the ballad was exclusively the prose, not the play.

== Date and text ==
=== Date ===
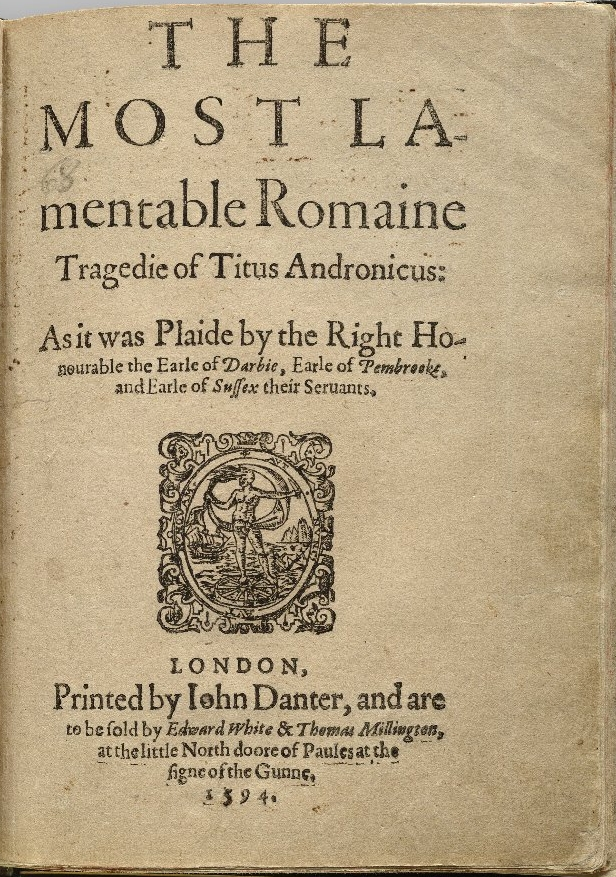
Title page of the first quarto (1594)

The earliest known record of Titus Andronicus is found in Philip Henslowe's diary on 24 January 1594, where Henslowe recorded a performance by Sussex's Men of "Titus & ondronicus", probably at The Rose. Henslowe marked the play as "ne", which most critics take to mean "new". There were subsequent performances on 29 January and 6 February. Also on 6 February, the printer John Danter entered into the Stationers' Register "A booke intitled a Noble Roman Historye of Tytus Andronicus". Later in 1594, Danter published the play in quarto under the title The Most Lamentable Romaine Tragedie of Titus Andronicus (referred to by scholars as Q1) for the booksellers Edward White and Thomas Millington, making it the first of Shakespeare's plays to be printed. This evidence establishes that the latest possible date of composition is late 1593.

One of the two known copies of the second edition of Titus Andronicus is a part of The University of Edinburgh Heritage Collection. This was donated by William Hog in 1700. In the 1860s this copy was lent to Shakespeare scholar and collector James Orchard Halliwell-Phillips so he could make a facsimile. This arrangement, brokered by David Laing, eventually led to Halliwell-Phillips donating a vast collection of books and manuscripts to Edinburgh University Library.

There is evidence, however, that the play may have been written some years earlier than this. In 1614, Ben Jonson wrote in a preface to Bartholomew Fair that "He that will swear, Jeronimo or Andronicus are the best plays, yet shall pass unexcepted at, here, as a man whose judgement shows it is constant, and hath stood still these five and twenty, or thirty years." The success and popularity of Thomas Kyd's The Spanish Tragedy, to which Jonson alludes, is attested by many contemporary documents, so by placing Titus alongside it, Jonson is saying that Titus too must have been extremely popular in its day, but by 1614, both plays had come to be seen as old fashioned. If Jonson is taken literally, for the play to have been between 25 and 30 years old in 1614, it must have been written between 1584 and 1589, a theory which not all scholars reject out of hand. For example, in his 1953 edition of the play for the Arden Shakespeare 2nd Series, J. C. Maxwell argues for a date of late 1589. Similarly, E. A. J. Honigmann, in his 'early start' theory of 1982, suggests that Shakespeare wrote the play several years before coming to London c. 1590, and that Titus was actually his first play, written c. 1586. In his Cambridge Shakespeare edition of 1994 and again in 2006, Alan Hughes makes a similar argument, believing the play was written very early in Shakespeare's career, before he came to London, possibly c. 1588.

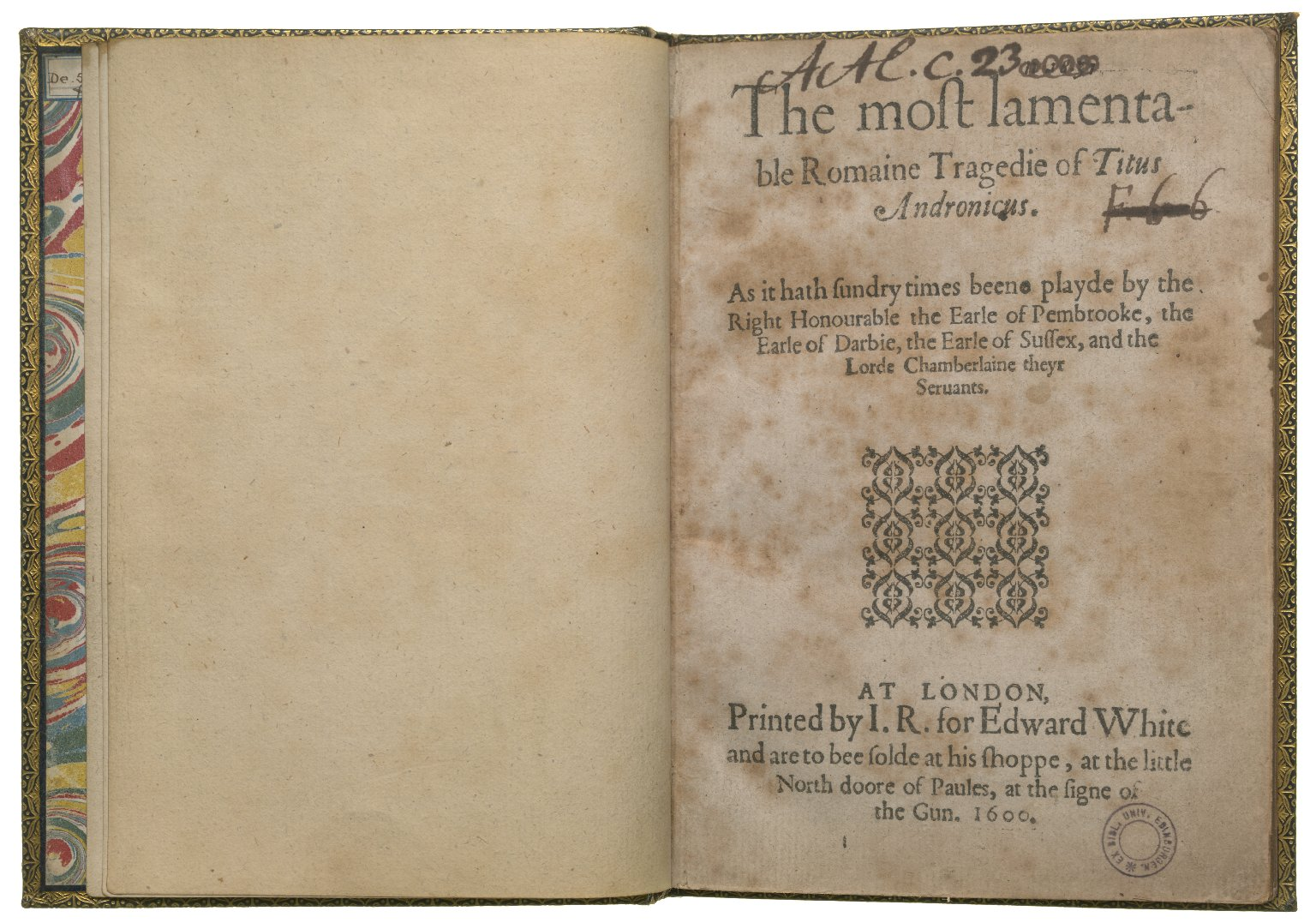
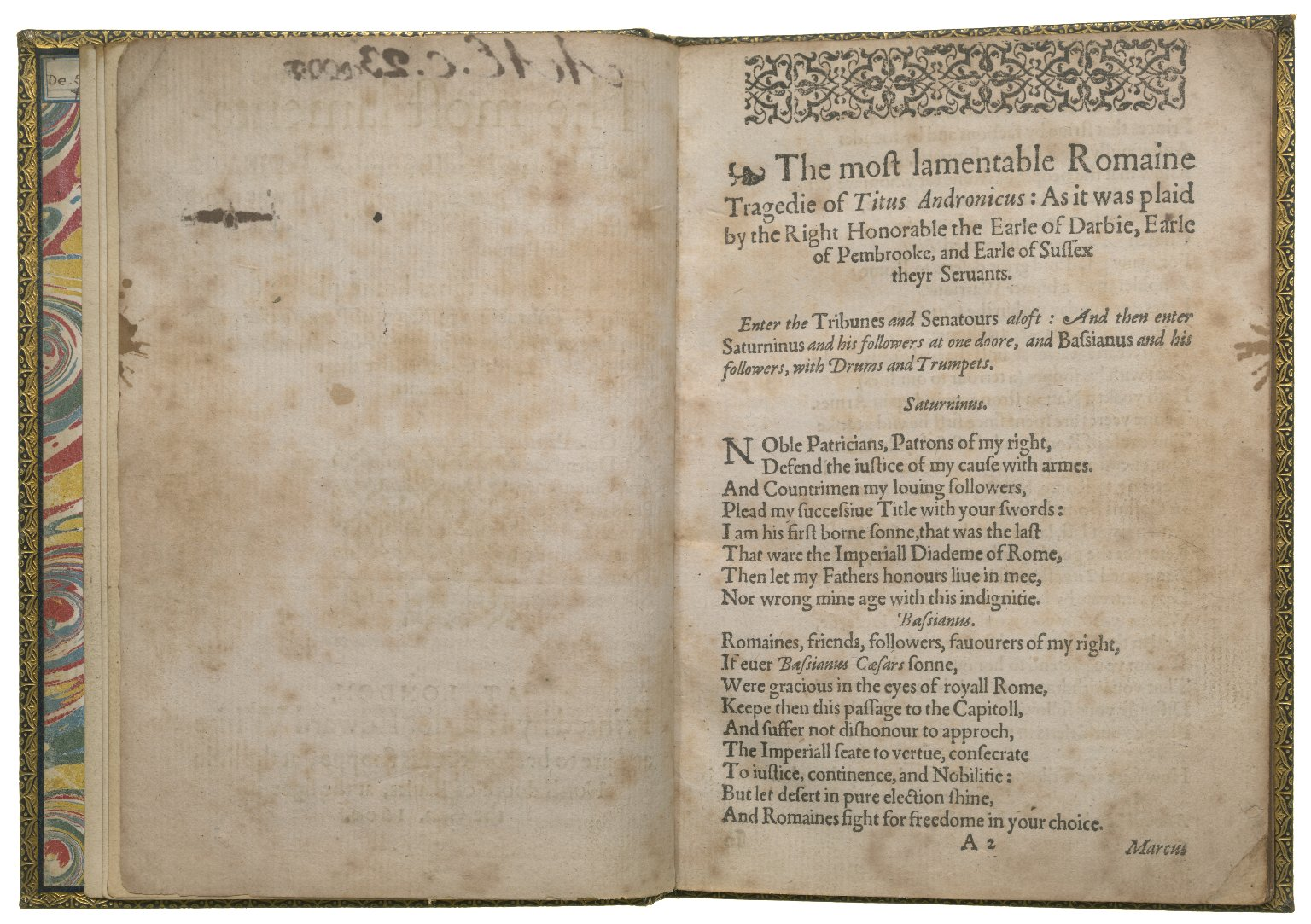
Title page (top) and first page (bottom) of the second edition of Titus Andronicus, 1600

However, the majority of scholars tend to favour a post-1590 date, and one of the primary arguments for this is that the title page of Q1 assigns the play to three different playing companies; Derby's Men, Pembroke's Men and Sussex's Men ("As it was Plaide by the Right Honourable the Earle of Darbie, Earle of Pembrooke, and Earle of Suſſex their Seruants"). This is highly unusual in copies of Elizabethan plays, which usually refer to one company only, if any. If the order of the listing is chronological, as Eugene M. Waith and Jacques Berthoud, for example, believe it is, it means that Sussex's Men were the last to perform the play, suggesting it had been on stage quite some time prior to 24 January 1594. Waith hypothesises that the play originally belonged to Derby's Men, but after the closure of the London theatres on 23 June 1592 due to an outbreak of plague, Derby's Men sold the play to Pembroke's Men, who were going on a regional tour to Bath and Ludlow. The tour was a financial failure, and the company returned to London on 28 September, financially ruined. At that point, they sold the play to Sussex's Men, who would go on to perform it on 24 January 1594 at The Rose. If one accepts this theory, it suggests a date of composition as some time in early to mid-1592. However, Jonathan Bate and Alan Hughes have argued that there is no evidence that the listing is chronological, and no precedent on other title pages for making that assumption. Additionally, a later edition of the play gives a different order of acting companies – Pembroke's Men, Derby's Men, Sussex' Men and Lord Chamberlain's Men, suggesting the order is random and cannot be used to help date the play.

As such, even amongst scholars who favour a post-1590 date, 1592 is by no means universally accepted. Jacques Berthoud, for example, argues that Shakespeare had close associations with Derby's Men and "it would seem that Titus Andronicus must already have entered the repertoire of Derby's Men by the end of 1591 or the start of 1592 at the latest." Berthoud believes this places the date of composition some time in 1591. Another theory is provided by Jonathan Bate, who finds it significant that Q1 lacks the "sundry times" comment found on virtually every sixteenth-century play; the claim on a title page that a play had been performed "sundry times" was an attempt by publishers to emphasise its popularity, and its absence on Q1 indicates that the play was so new, it hadn't been performed anywhere. Bate also finds significance in the fact that prior to the rape of Lavinia, Chiron and Demetrius vow to use Bassianus's body as a pillow. Bate believes this connects the play to Thomas Nashe's The Unfortunate Traveller, which was completed on 27 June 1593. Verbal similarities between Titus and George Peele's poem The Honour of the Garter are also important for Bate. The poem was written to celebrate the installation of Henry Percy, 9th Earl of Northumberland as a Knight of the Garter on 26 June 1593. Bate takes these three pieces of evidence to suggest a timeline which sees Shakespeare complete his Henry VI trilogy prior to the closing of the theatres in June 1592. At this time, he turns to classical antiquity to aid him in his poems Venus and Adonis and The Rape of Lucrece. Then, towards the end of 1593, with the prospect of the theatres being reopened, and with the classical material still fresh in his mind, he wrote Titus as his first tragedy, shortly after reading Nashe's novel and Peele's poem, all of which suggests a date of composition of late 1593.

Other critics have attempted to use more scientific methods to determine the date of the play. For example, Gary Taylor has employed stylometry, particularly the study of contractions, colloquialisms, rare words and function words. Taylor concludes that the entire play except Act 3, Scene 2 was written just after Henry VI, Part 2 and Henry VI, Part 3, which he assigns to late 1591 or early 1592. As such, Taylor settles on a date of mid-1592 for Titus. He also argues that 3.2, which is only found in the 1623 Folio text, was written contemporaneously with Romeo and Juliet, in late 1593.

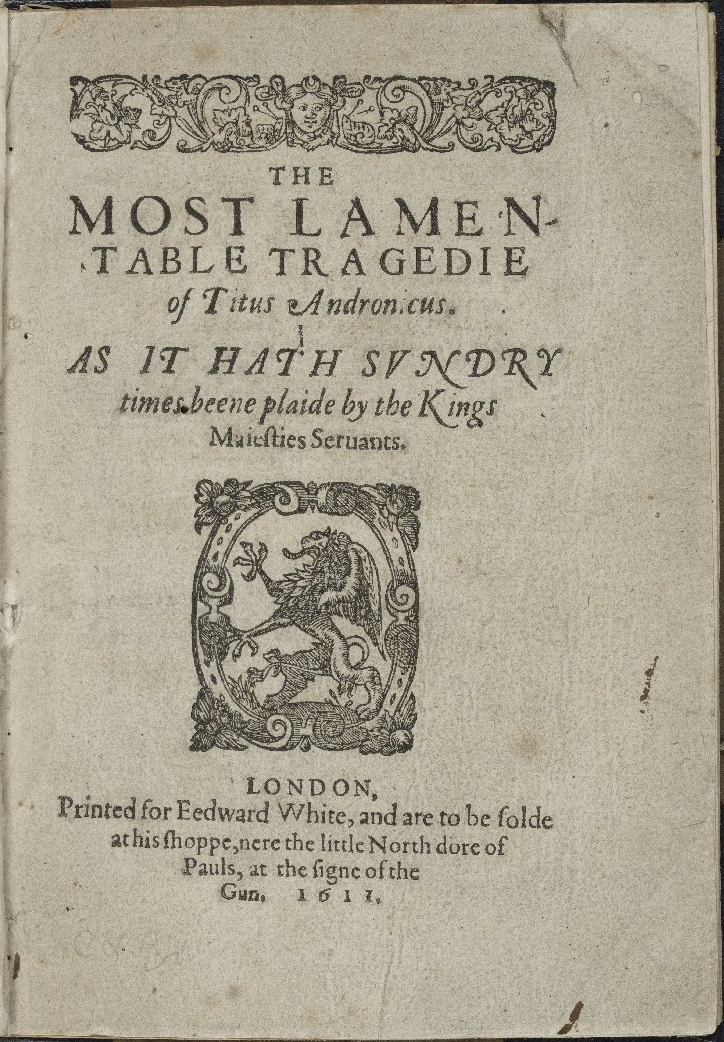
Title page of the third quarto (1611)

However, if the play was written and performed by 1588 (Hughes), 1589 (Maxwell), 1591 (Berthoud), 1592 (Waith and Taylor), or 1593 (Bate), why did Henslowe refer to it as "ne" in 1594? R.A. Foakes and R.T. Rickert, modern editors of Henslowe's Diary, argue that "ne" could refer to a newly licensed play, which would make sense if one accepts Waith's argument that Pembroke's Men had sold the rights to Sussex's Men upon returning from their failed tour of the provinces. Foakes and Rickert also point out that "ne" could refer to a newly revised play, suggesting editing on Shakespeare's part some time in late 1593. Waith sees this suggestion as especially important insofar as John Dover Wilson and Gary Taylor have shown that the text as it exists in Q1 does seem to indicate editing. However, that "ne" does actually stand for "new" is not fully accepted; in 1991, Winifred Frazer argued that "ne" is actually an abbreviation for "Newington Butts". Brian Vickers, amongst others, finds Frazer's arguments convincing, which renders interpretation of Henslow's entry even more complex.

=== Text ===
The 1594 quarto text of the play, with the same title, was reprinted by James Roberts for Edward White in 1600 (Q2). On 19 April 1602, Millington sold his share in the copyright to Thomas Pavier. However, the next version of the play was published again for White, in 1611, under the slightly altered title The Most Lamentable Tragedie of Titus Andronicus, printed by Edward Allde (Q3).

Q1 is considered a 'good text' (i.e. not a bad quarto or a reported text), and it forms the basis for most modern editions of the play. Q2 appears to be based on a damaged copy of Q1, as it is missing a number of lines which are replaced by what appear to be guess work on the part of the compositor. This is especially noticeable at the end of the play where four lines of dialogue have been added to Lucius's closing speech; "See justice done on Aaron, that damned Moor,/By whom our heavy haps had their beginning;/Then afterwards to order well the state,/That like events may ne'er it ruinate." Scholars tend to assume that when the compositor got to the last page and saw the damage, he presumed some lines were missing, when in fact none were. Q2 was considered the control text until 1904, when the copy of Q1 now at the Folger Shakespeare Library was discovered in Sweden. Together with a 1594 printing of Henry VI, Part II, the Folger's Q1 Titus is the earliest extant printed Shakespearean play. Q2 also corrects a number of minor errors in Q1. Q3 is a further degradation of Q2, and includes a number of corrections to the Q2 text, but introduces many more errors.

The First Folio text of 1623 (F1), under the title The Lamentable Tragedy of Titus Andronicus, is based primarily on the Q3 text (which is why modern editors use Q1 as the control rather than the usual practice in Shakespeare of using the Folio text). However, the Folio text includes material found in none of the quarto editions, primarily Act 3, Scene 2 (also called the 'fly-killing scene'). It is believed that while Q3 was probably the main source for the Folio, an annotated prompter's copy was also used, particularly in relation to stage directions, which differ significantly from all of the quarto texts.

As such, the text of the play that is today known as Titus Andronicus involves a combination of material from Q1 and F1, the vast majority of which is taken from Q1.

=== The Peacham drawing ===
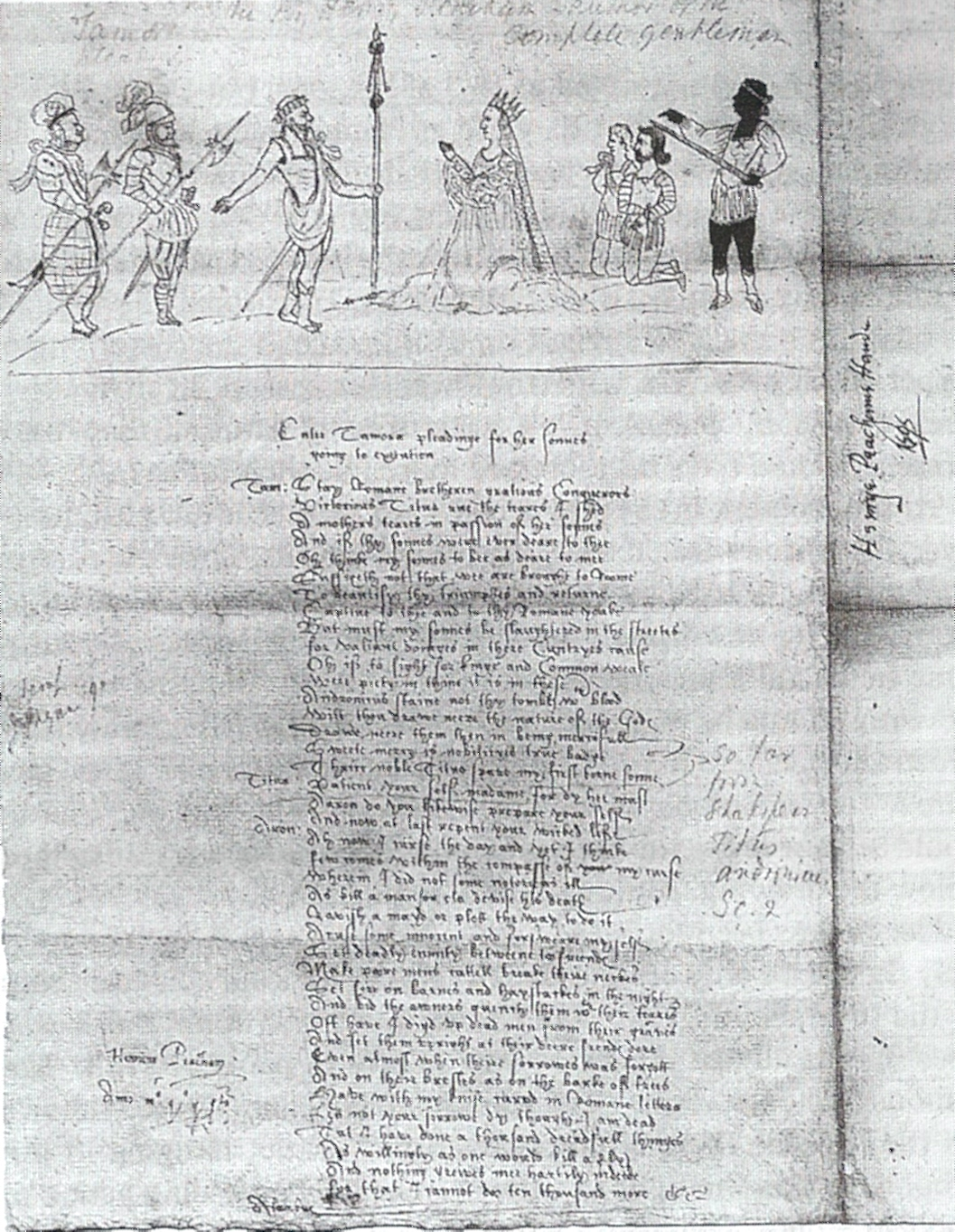
The Peacham drawing (c. 1595)

An important piece of evidence relating to both the dating and text of Titus is the so-called 'Peacham drawing' or 'Longleat manuscript'; the only surviving contemporary Shakespearean illustration, now residing in the library of the Marquess of Bath at Longleat. The drawing appears to depict a performance of Titus, under which is quoted some dialogue. Eugene M. Waith argues of the illustration that "the gestures and costumes give us a more vivid impression of the visual impact of Elizabethan acting than we get from any other source."

Far from being an acknowledged source of evidence however, the document has provoked varying interpretations, with its date in particular often called into question. The fact that the text reproduced in the drawing seems to borrow from Q1, Q2, Q3 and F1, while also inventing some of its own readings, further complicates matters. Additionally, a possible association with Shakespearean forger John Payne Collier has served to undermine its authenticity, while some scholars believe it depicts a play other than Titus Andronicus, and is therefore of limited use to Shakespeareans.

== Analysis and criticism ==
=== Critical history ===
Although Titus was extremely popular in its day, over the course of the 17th, 18th and 19th centuries it became perhaps Shakespeare's most maligned play, and it was only in the latter half of the 20th century that this pattern of denigration showed any signs of subsiding.

One of the earliest critical disparagements of the play occurred in 1687, in the introduction to Edward Ravenscroft's theatrical adaptation, Titus Andronicus, or the Rape of Lavinia. A Tragedy, Alter'd from Mr. Shakespeare's Works. Speaking of the original play, Ravenscroft wrote, "'tis the most incorrect and indigested piece in all his works. It seems rather a heap of rubbish than a structure." In 1765, Samuel Johnson questioned the possibility of even staging the play, pointing out that "the barbarity of the spectacles, and the general massacre which are here exhibited, can scarcely be conceived tolerable to any audience". In 1811, August Wilhelm Schlegel wrote that the play was "framed according to a false idea of the tragic, which by an accumulation of cruelties and enormities, degenerated into the horrible and yet leaves no deep impression behind".

In 1927, T. S. Eliot argued that it was "one of the stupidest and most uninspired plays ever written, a play in which it is incredible that Shakespeare had any hand at all, a play in which the best passages would be too highly honoured by the signature of Peele." In 1948, John Dover Wilson wrote that the play "seems to jolt and bump along like some broken-down cart, laden with bleeding corpses from an Elizabethan scaffold, and driven by an executioner from Bedlam dressed in cap and bells." He goes on to say that if the play had been by anyone other than Shakespeare, it would have been lost and forgotten; it is only because tradition holds that Shakespeare wrote it (which Dover Wilson highly suspects) that it is remembered, not for any intrinsic qualities of its own.

However, although the play continued to have its detractors, it began to acquire its champions as well. In his 1998 book, Shakespeare: The Invention of the Human, Harold Bloom defended Titus from various critical attacks it has had over the years, insisting the play is meant to be a "parody" and it is only bad "if you take it straight". He claims the uneven reactions audiences have had are a result of directors misunderstanding Shakespeare's intent, which was "mocking and exploiting Marlowe", and its only suitable director would be Mel Brooks.

Another champion came in 2001, when Jacques Berthoud pointed out that until shortly after World War II, "Titus Andronicus was taken seriously only by a handful of textual and bibliographic scholars. Readers, when they could be found, mostly regarded it as a contemptible farrago of violence and bombast, while theatrical managers treated it as either a script in need of radical rewriting, or as a show-biz opportunity for a star actor." By 2001 however, this was no longer the case, as many prominent scholars had come out in defence of the play. One such scholar was Jan Kott. Speaking of its apparent gratuitous violence, Kott argued that

Titus Andronicus is by no means the most brutal of Shakespeare's plays. More people die in Richard III. King Lear is a much more cruel play. In the whole Shakespearean repertory I can find no scene so revolting as Cordelia's death. In reading, the cruelties of Titus can seem ridiculous. But I have seen it on the stage and found it a moving experience. Why? In watching Titus Andronicus we come to understand – perhaps more than by looking at any other Shakespeare play – the nature of his genius: he gave an inner awareness to passions; cruelty ceased to be merely physical. Shakespeare discovered the moral hell. He discovered heaven as well. But he remained on earth.

In his 1987 edition of the play for the Contemporary Shakespeare series, A. L. Rowse speculates as to why the fortunes of the play have begun to change during the 20th century:

in the civilised Victorian age the play could not be performed because it could not be believed. Such is the horror of our own age, with the appalling barbarities of prison camps and resistance movements paralleling the torture and mutilation and feeding on human flesh of the play, that it has ceased to be improbable.

Thomas Kirk's painting of Aaron protecting his son from Chiron and Demetrius in Act 4, Scene 2 (c. 1796)

The director Julie Taymor, who staged a production off-Broadway in 1994 and directed a film version in 1999, says she was drawn to the play because she found it to be the "[most] relevant of Shakespeare's plays for the modern era". As she believes we live in the most violent period in history, Taymor feels that the play has acquired more relevance for us than it had for the Victorians; "it seems like a play written for today, it reeks of now". Jonathan Forman, when he reviewed Taymor's film for the New York Post, agreed and stated "It is the Shakespeare play for our time, a work of art that speaks directly to the age of Rwanda and Bosnia."

==== Authorship ====
Perhaps the most frequently discussed topic in the play's critical history is that of authorship. None of the three quarto editions of Titus name the author, which was normal for Elizabethan plays. However, Francis Meres does list the play as one of Shakespeare's tragedies in Palladis Tamia in 1598. Additionally, John Heminges and Henry Condell felt sure enough of Shakespeare's authorship to include it in the First Folio in 1623. As such, with what little available solid evidence suggesting that Shakespeare did indeed write the play, questions of authorship tend to focus on the perceived lack of quality in the writing, and often the play's resemblance to the work of contemporaneous dramatists.

The first to question Shakespeare's authorship is thought to have been Edward Ravenscroft in 1678, and over the course of the eighteenth century, numerous renowned Shakespeareans followed suit; Nicholas Rowe, Alexander Pope, Lewis Theobald, Samuel Johnson, George Steevens, Edmond Malone, William Guthrie, John Upton, Benjamin Heath, Richard Farmer, John Pinkerton, and John Monck Mason, and in the nineteenth century, William Hazlitt and Samuel Taylor Coleridge. All doubted Shakespeare's authorship. So strong had the anti-Shakespearean movement become during the eighteenth century that in 1794, Thomas Percy wrote in the introduction to Reliques of Ancient English Poetry, "Shakespeare's memory has been fully vindicated from the charge of writing the play by the best critics." Similarly, in 1832, the Globe Illustrated Shakespeare claimed there was universal agreement on the matter due to the un-Shakespearean "barbarity" of the play.

However, despite the fact that so many Shakespearean scholars believed the play to have been written by someone other than Shakespeare, there were those throughout the eighteenth and nineteenth century who argued against this theory. One such scholar was Edward Capell, who, in 1768, said that the play was badly written but asserted that Shakespeare did write it. Another major scholar to support Shakespeare's authorship was Charles Knight in 1843. Several years later, a number of prominent German Shakespeareans also voiced their belief that Shakespeare wrote the play, including August Wilhelm Schlegel and Hermann Ulrici.

Twentieth century criticism moved away from trying to prove or disprove that Shakespeare wrote the play, and instead came to focus on the issue of co-authorship. Ravenscroft had hinted at this in 1678, but the first modern scholar to look at the theory was John Mackinnon Robertson in 1905, who concluded that "much of the play is written by George Peele, and it is hardly less certain that much of the rest was written by Robert Greene or Kyd, with some by Marlow". In 1919, T. M. Parrott reached the conclusion that Peele wrote Act 1, 2.1 and 4.1, and in 1931, Philip Timberlake corroborated Parrott's findings.

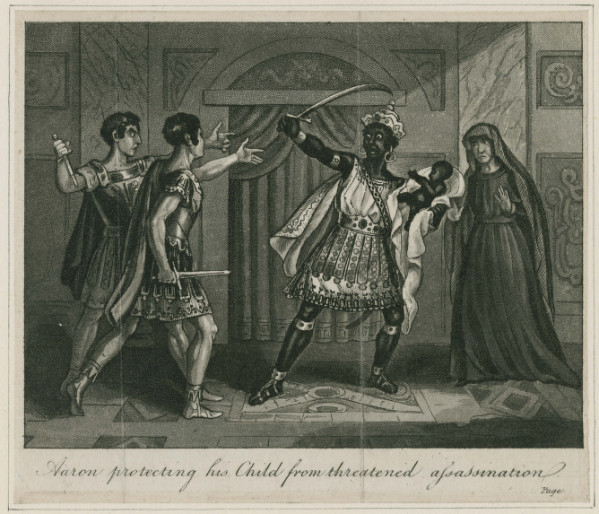
Illustration of Aaron protecting his son from Chiron and Demetrius in Act 4, Scene 2; from Joseph Graves's Dramatic tales founded on Shakespeare's plays (1840)

The first major critic to challenge Robertson, Parrott and Timberlake was E. K. Chambers, who successfully exposed inherent flaws in Robertson's methodology. In 1933, Arthur M. Sampley employed the techniques of Parrott to argue against Peele as co-author, and in 1943, Hereward Thimbleby Price also argued that Shakespeare wrote alone.

Beginning in 1948, with John Dover Wilson, many scholars have tended to favour the theory that Shakespeare and Peele collaborated in some way. Dover Wilson, for his part, believed that Shakespeare edited a play originally written by Peele. In 1957, R. F. Hill approached the issue by analysing the distribution of rhetorical devices in the play. Like Parrott in 1919 and Timberlake in 1931, he ultimately concluded that Peele wrote Act 1, 2.1 and 4.1, while Shakespeare wrote everything else. In 1979, Macdonald Jackson employed a rare word test, and ultimately came to an identical conclusion as Parrott, Timberlake and Hill. In 1987, Marina Tarlinskaja used a quantitative analysis of the occurrence of stresses in the iambic pentameter line, and she too concluded that Peele wrote Act 1, 2.1 and 4.1. In 1996, Macdonald Jackson returned to the authorship question with a new metrical analysis of the function words "and" and "with". His findings also suggested that Peele wrote Act 1, 2.1 and 4.1.

However, there have always been scholars who believe that Shakespeare worked on the play alone. Many of the editors of the various twentieth century scholarly editions of the play for example, have argued against the co-authorship theory; Eugene M. Waith in his Oxford Shakespeare edition of 1985, Alan Hughes in his Cambridge Shakespeare edition of 1994 and again in 2006, and Jonathan Bate in his Arden Shakespeare edition of 1995. In the case of Bate however, in 2002, he came out in support of Brian Vickers' book Shakespeare, Co-Author which restates the case for Peele as the author of Act 1, 2.1 and 4.1.

As well as analysing the distribution of a large number of rhetorical devices throughout the play, Vickers also devised three new authorship tests; an analysis of polysyllabic words, an analysis of the distribution of alliteration and an analysis of vocatives. His findings led him to assert that Peele wrote Act 1, 2.1 and 4.1. Vickers' findings have not been universally accepted. Subsequent investigation by the New Oxford Shakespeare published in the edition's Authorship Companion found that scene 4.1 is in fact by Shakespeare not Peele and that the Fly Scene (3.2), present only in 1623 Folio edition, is a late addition to the play, probably made by Thomas Middleton after Shakespeare died in 1616. These findings are disputed by Darren Freebury-Jones in Shakespeare's Borrowed Feathers, who provides fresh evidence for Peele's authorship of 4.1 and argues that the Fly Scene, though absent from earlier editions, probably formed part of the original play but was omitted when Shakespeare and Peele's scenes were merged.

Thomas North's 1557 translation of Dial of Princes has led to North being recognized as the author of the lost Titus and Vespasian, written in 1562, and that Titus Andronicus should be added to Shakespeare's list of 'borrowed' Roman plays.

=== Language ===
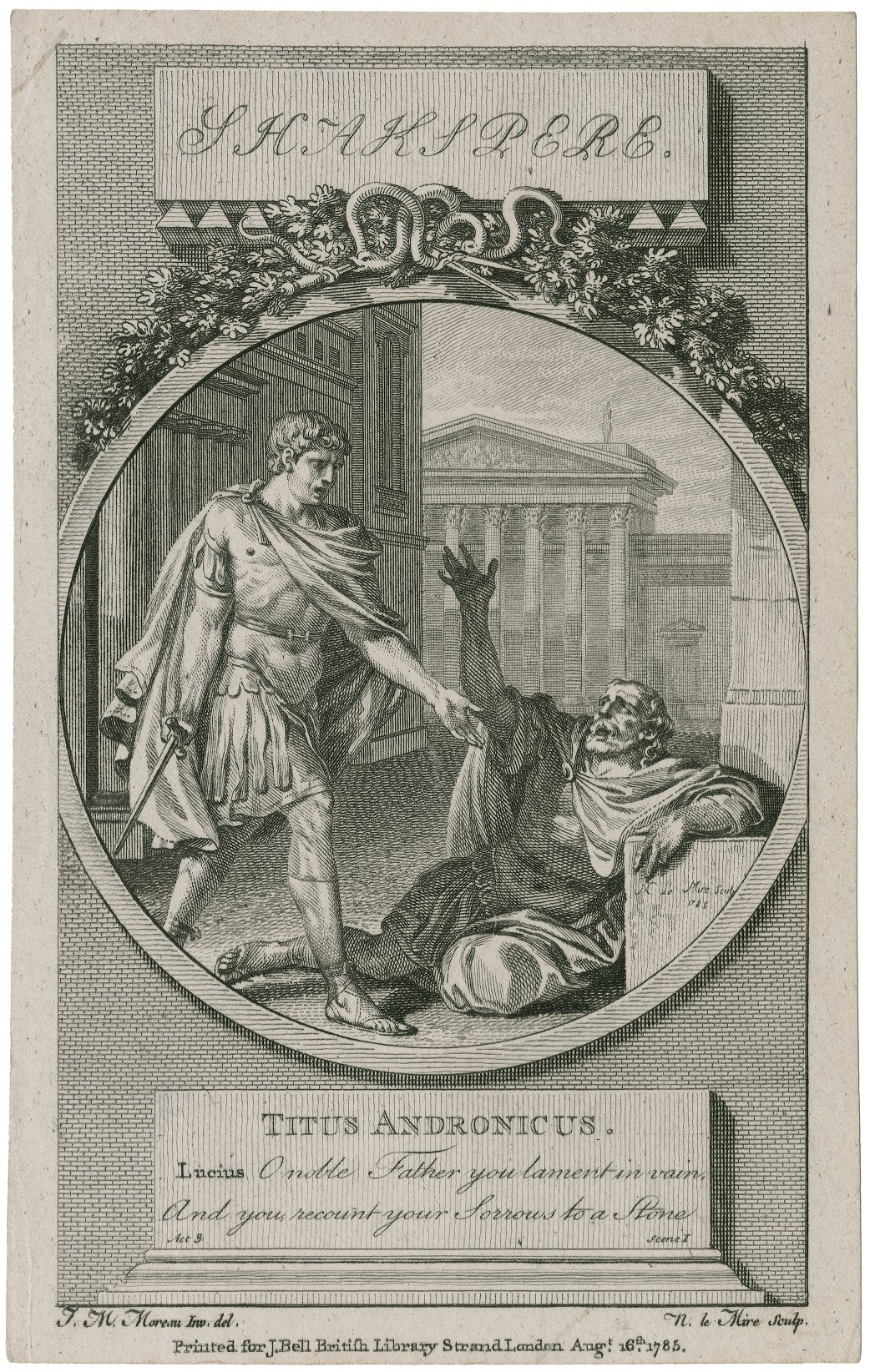
Jean-Michel Moreau illustration of Lucius telling his father the tribunes have left, from Act 3, Scene 1; engraved by N. le Mire (1785)

The language of Titus has always had a central role in criticism of the play insofar as those who doubt Shakespeare's authorship have often pointed to the apparent deficiencies in the language as evidence of that claim. However, the quality of the language has had its defenders over the years, critics who argue that the play is more linguistically complex than is often thought, and features a more accomplished use of certain linguistic motifs than has hitherto been allowed for.

One of the most basic such motifs is repetition. Several words and topics occur time and again, serving to connect and contrast characters and scenes, and to foreground certain themes. Perhaps the most obvious recurring motifs are those of honour, virtue and nobility, all of which are mentioned multiple times throughout the play, especially during the first act; the play's opening line is Saturninus's address to "Noble patricians, patrons of my right" (l.1). In the second speech of the play, Bassianus states "And suffer not dishonour to approach/The imperial seat, to virtue consecrate,/To justice, continence and nobility;/But let desert in pure election shine" (ll.13–16). From this point onwards, the concept of nobility is at the heart of everything that happens. H. B. Charlton argues of this opening Act that "the standard of moral currency most in use is honour".

When Marcus announces Titus's imminent arrival, he emphasises Titus's renowned honour and integrity: "And now at last, laden with honour's spoils,/Returns the good Andronicus to Rome,/Renowned Titus, flourishing in arms./Let us entreat by honour of his name/Whom worthily you would have now succeed" (ll.36–40). Marcus's reference to Titus's name is even itself an allusion to his nobility insofar as Titus's full title (Titus Pius) is an honorary epitaph which "refers to his devotion to patriotic duty".

Bassianus then cites his own admiration for all of the Andronici: "Marcus Andronicus, so I do affy/In thy uprightness and integrity,/And so I love and honour thee and thine,/Thy noble brother Titus, and his sons" (ll.47–50). Upon Titus's arrival, an announcement is made: "Patron of virtue, Rome's best champion,/Successful in the battles that he fights,/With honour and with fortune is returned" (ll.65–68). Once Titus has arrived on stage, it is not long before he too is speaking of honour, virtue and integrity, referring to the family tomb as a "sweet cell of virtue and nobility" (l.93). After Titus chooses Saturninus as Emperor, they praise one another's honour, with Saturninus referring to Titus's "honourable family" (ll.239) and Titus claiming "I hold me highly honoured of your grace" (ll.245). Titus then says to Tamora, "Now, madam, are you prisoner to an Emperor –/To him that for your honour and your state/Will use you nobly and your followers" (ll.258–260).

Even when things begin to go awry for the Andronici, each one maintains a firm grasp of his own interpretation of honour. The death of Mutius comes about because Titus and his sons have different concepts of honour; Titus feels the Emperor's desires should have precedence, his sons that Roman law should govern all, including the Emperor. As such, when Lucius reprimands Titus for slaying one of his own sons, Titus responds "Nor thou, nor he, are any sons of mine;/My sons would never so dishonour me" (l.296). Moments later, Saturninus declares to Titus "I'll trust by leisure him that mocks me once,/Thee never, nor thy traitorous haughty sons,/Confederates all to dishonour me" (ll.301–303). Subsequently, Titus cannot quite believe that Saturninus has chosen Tamora as his empress and again sees himself dishonoured; "Titus, when wert thou wont to walk alone,/Dishonoured thus and challeng'd of wrongs" (ll.340–341). When Marcus is pleading with Titus that Mutius should be allowed to be buried in the family tomb, he implores, "Suffer thy brother Marcus to inter/His noble nephew here in virtue's nest,/That died in honour and Lavinia's cause" (ll.375–377). Having reluctantly agreed to allow Mutius a royal burial, Titus then returns to the issue of how he feels his sons have turned on him and dishonoured him: "The dismall'st day is this that e'er I saw,/To be dishonoured by my sons in Rome" (ll.384–385). At this point, Marcus, Martius, Quintus and Lucius declare of the slain Mutius, "He lives in fame, that died in virtue's cause" (ll.390).

Other characters also become involved in the affray resulting from the disagreement among the Andronici, and they too are equally concerned with honour. After Saturninus has condemned Titus, Bassianus appeals to him, "This noble gentleman, Lord Titus here,/Is in opinion and in honour wronged" (ll.415–416). Then, in a surprising move, Tamora suggests to Saturninus that he should forgive Titus and his family. Saturninus is at first aghast, believing that Tamora is now dishonouring him as well; "What madam, be dishonoured openly,/And basely put it up without revenge?" (ll.442–443), to which Tamora replies,

Not so, my lord; the gods of Rome forefend
I should be author to dishonour you.
But on mine honour dare I undertake
For good Lord Titus' innocence in all,
Whose fury not dissembled speaks his griefs.
Then at my suit look graciously on him;
Lose not so noble a friend on vain suppose.

— ll.434–440

The irony here, of course, is that her false appeal to honour is what begins the bloody cycle of revenge which dominates the rest of the play.

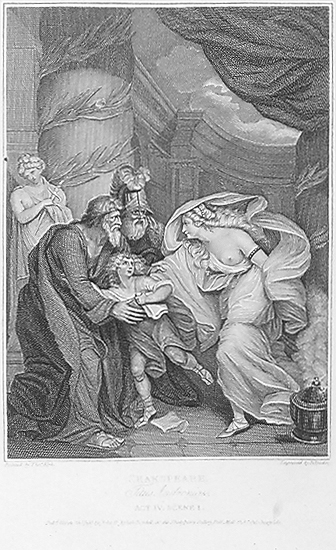
Thomas Kirk illustration of Young Lucius fleeing from Lavinia in Act 4, Scene 1; engraved by B. Reading (1799)

Although not all subsequent scenes are as heavily saturated with references to honour, nobility and virtue as is the opening, they are continually alluded to throughout the play. Other notable examples include Aaron's description of Tamora; "Upon her wit doth earthly honour wait,/And virtue stoops and trembles at her frown" (2.1.10–11). An ironic and sarcastic reference to honour occurs when Bassianus and Lavinia encounter Aaron and Tamora in the forest and Bassianus tells Tamora "your swarthy Cimmerian/Doth make your honour of his body's hue,/Spotted, detested, and abominable" (2.3.72–74). Later, after the Clown has delivered Titus's letter to Saturninus, Saturninus declares "Go, drag the villain hither by the hair./Nor age nor honour shall shape privilege" (4.4.55–56). Another example is seen outside Rome, when a Goth refers to Lucius "Whose high exploits and honourable deeds/Ingrateful Rome requites with foul contempt" (5.1.11–12).

A further significant motif is metaphor related to violence: "the world of Titus is not simply one of meaningless acts of random violence but rather one in which language engenders violence and violence is done to language through the distance between word and thing, between metaphor and what it represents." For example, in 3.1 when Titus asks Aaron to cut off his hand because he believes it will save his sons' lives he says, "Lend me thy hand, and I will give thee mine." Therefore, in the language of Titus, "to lend one's hand is to risk dismemberment."

No discussion of the language of Titus is complete without reference to Marcus's speech upon finding Lavinia after her rape:

Who is this? My niece that flies away so fast?
Cousin, a word: where is your husband?
If I do dream, would all my wealth would wake me!
If I do wake, some Planet strike me down,
That I may slumber in eternal sleep!
Speak, gentle niece, what stern ungentle hands
Hath lopped, and hewed and made thy body bare
Of her two branches, those sweet ornaments,
Whose circling shadows, Kings have sought to sleep in,
And might not gain so great a happiness
As half thy love? Why dost not speak to me?
Alas, a crimson river of warm blood,
Like to a bubbling fountain stirred with wind,
Doth rise and fall between thy ros'd lips,
Coming and going with thy honey breath.
But sure some Tereus hath deflowered thee,
And, lest thou shouldst detect him, cut thy tongue.
Ah, now thou turn'st away thy face for shame;
And notwithstanding all this loss of blood,
As from a conduit with three issuing spouts,
Yet do thy cheeks look red as Titan's face,
Blushing to be encountered with a cloud.
Shall I speak for thee? Shall I say 'tis so?
O, that I knew thy heart, and knew the beast,
That I might rail at him to ease my mind!
Sorrow conceal'd, like an oven stopped,
Doth burn the heart to cinders where it is.
Fair Philomela, why she but lost her tongue,
And in a tedious sampler sewed her mind;
But, lovely niece, that mean is cut from thee.
A craftier Tereus, cousin, hast thou met,
And he hath cut those pretty fingers off,
That could have better sowed then Philomel.
O, had the monster seen those lily hands
Tremble, like aspen leaves, upon a lute,
And make the silken strings delight to kiss them,
He would not then have touched them for his life.
Or, had he heard the heavenly harmony
Which that sweet tongue hath made,
He would have dropped his knife and fell asleep,
As Cerberus at the Thracian poet's feet.
Come, let us go, and make thy father blind,
For such a sight will blind a father's eye.
One hour's storm will drown the fragrant meads;
What will whole months of tears thy father's eyes?
Do not draw back, for we will mourn with thee;
O, could our mourning ease thy misery!

— 2.4.11–57

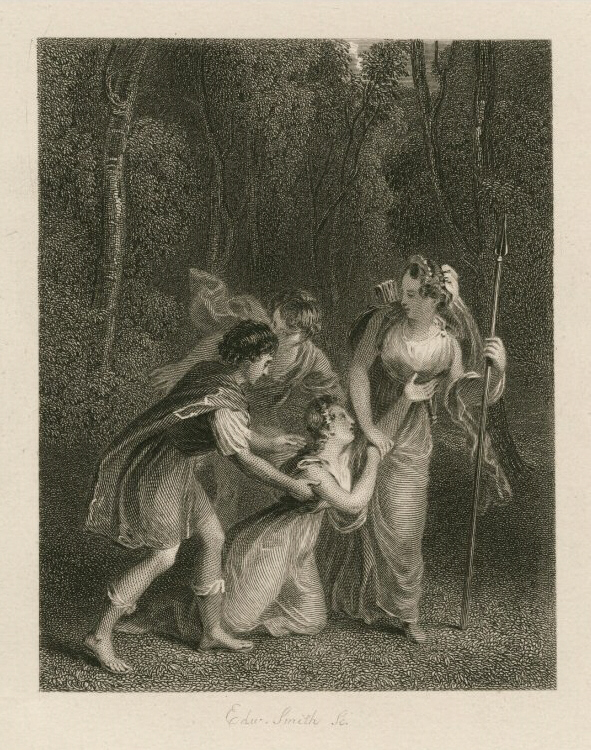
Edward Smith illustration of Lavinia pleading with Tamora for mercy from Act 2, Scene 3 (1841)

In this much discussed speech, the discrepancy between the beautiful imagery and the horrific sight before us has been noted by many critics as jarring, and the speech is often severely edited or completely removed for performance; in the 1955 RSC production, for example, director Peter Brook cut the speech entirely. There is also a great deal of disagreement amongst critics as to the essential meaning of the speech. John Dover Wilson, for example, sees it as nothing more than a parody, Shakespeare mocking the work of his contemporaries by writing something so bad. He finds no other tonally analogous speech in all of Shakespeare, concluding it is "a bundle of ill-matched conceits held together by sticky sentimentalism". Similarly, Eugene M. Waith determines that the speech is an aesthetic failure that may have looked good on the page but which is incongruous in performance.

However, defenders of the play have posited several theories which seek to illustrate the thematic relevance of the speech. For example, Nicholas Brooke argues that it "stands in the place of a choric commentary on the crime, establishing its significance to the play by making an emblem of the mutilated woman". Actress Eve Myles, who played Lavinia in the 2003 RSC production, suggests that Marcus "tries to bandage her wounds with language", thus the speech has a calming effect and is Marcus's attempt to soothe Lavinia.

Another theory is suggested by Anthony Brian Taylor, who argues simply that Marcus is babbling; "beginning with references to 'dream' and 'slumber' and ending with one to sleep, the speech is an old man's reverie; shaken by the horrible and totally unexpected spectacle before him, he has succumbed to the senile tendency to drift away and become absorbed in his own thoughts rather than confront the harshness of reality." Jonathan Bate however, sees the speech as more complex, arguing that it attempts to give voice to the indescribable. Bate thus sees it as an illustration of language's ability to "bring back that which has been lost", i.e. Lavinia's beauty and innocence is figuratively returned in the beauty of the language. Similarly, for Brian Vickers, "these sensual pictorial images are appropriate to Lavinia's beauty now forever destroyed. That is, they serve one of the constant functions of tragedy, to document the metabolé, that tragic contrast between what people once were and what they have become." Jacques Berthoud provides another theory, arguing that the speech "exhibits two qualities seldom found together: an unevasive emotional recognition of the horrors of her injuries, and the knowledge that, despite her transformation into a living grave of herself, she remains the person he knows and loves". Thus, the speech evokes Marcus's "protective identification" with her. D. J. Palmer feels that the speech is an attempt to rationalise in Marcus's own mind the sheer horror of what he is seeing;

Marcus' lament is an effort to realise a sight that taxes to the utmost the powers of understanding and utterance. The vivid conceits in which he pictures his hapless niece do not transform or depersonalise her: she is already transformed and depersonalised ... Far from being a retreat from the awful reality into some aesthetic distance, then, Marcus' conceits dwell upon this figure that is to him both familiar and strange, fair and hideous, living body and object: this is, and is not, Lavinia. Lavinia's plight is literally unutterable ... Marcus' formal lament articulates unspeakable woes. Here and throughout the play the response to the intolerable is ritualised, in language and action, because ritual is the ultimate means by which man seeks to order and control his precarious and unstable world.

In contradistinction to Dover Wilson and Waith, several scholars have argued that while the speech may not work on the page, it can work in performance. Discussing the Deborah Warner RSC production at The Swan in 1987, which used an unedited text, Stanley Wells argues that Donald Sumpter's delivery of the speech "became a deeply moving attempt to master the facts and thus to overcome the emotional shock of a previously unimagined horror. We had the sense of a suspension of time, as if the speech represented an articulation, necessarily extended in expression, of a sequence of thoughts and emotions, that might have taken no more than a second or two to flash through the character's mind, like a bad dream." Also speaking of the Warner production and Sumpter's performance, Alan C. Dessen writes "we observe Marcus, step-by-step, use his logic and Lavinia's reactions to work out what has happened, so that the spectators both see Lavinia directly and see through his eyes and images. In the process the horror of the situation is filtered through a human consciousness in a way difficult to describe but powerful to experience."

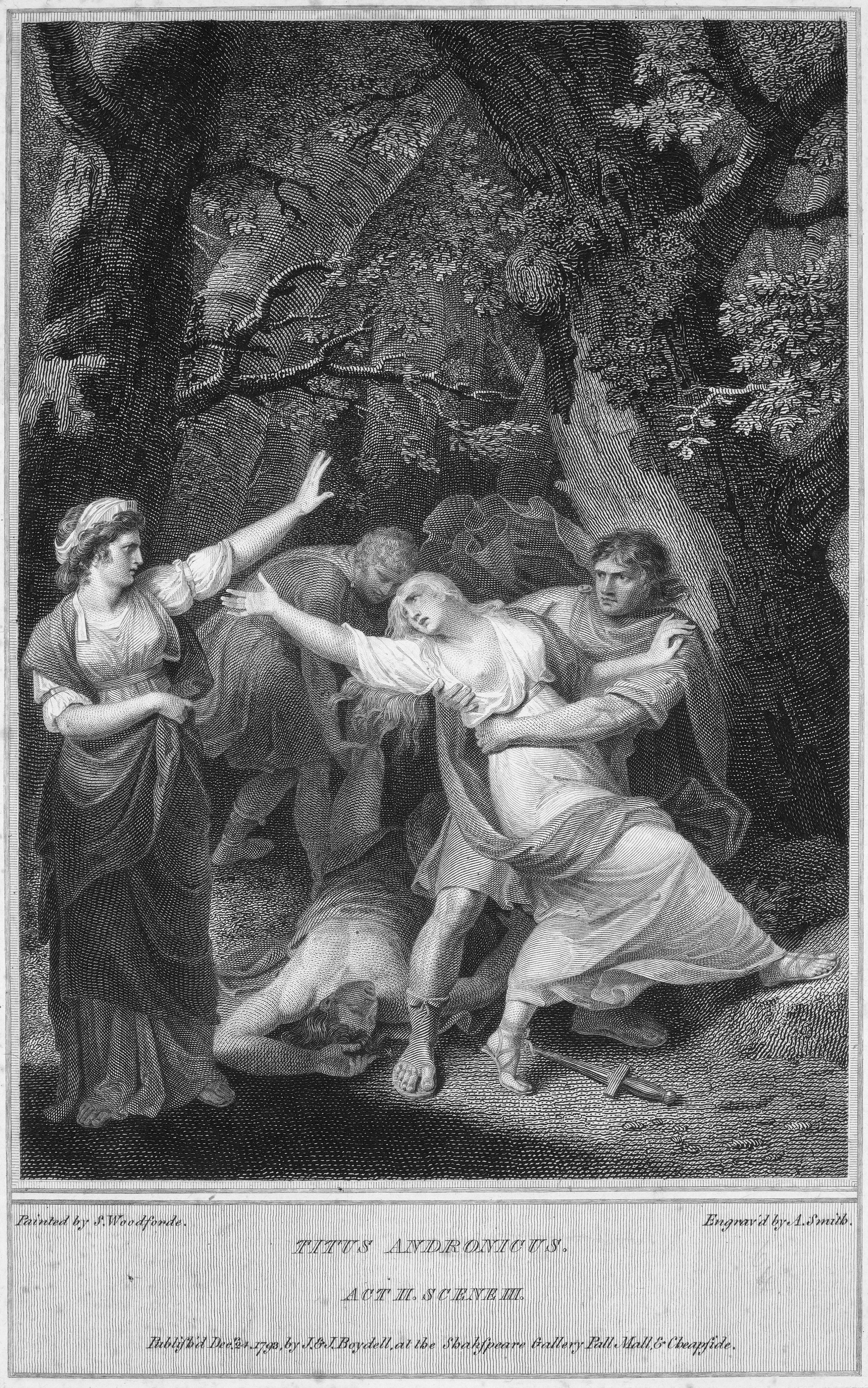
Samuel Woodforde illustration of Tamora watching Lavinia dragged away to be raped, from Act 2, Scene 3; engraved by Anker Smith (1793)

Looking at the language of the play in a more general sense has also produced a range of critical theories. For example, Jacques Berthoud argues that the rhetoric of the play is explicitly bound up with its theme; "the entire dramatic script, soliloquies included, functions as a network of responses and reactions. [The language's] primary and consistent function is interlocutory." An entirely different interpretation is that of Jack Reese, who argues that Shakespeare's use of language functions to remove the audience from the effects and implications of violence; it has an almost Brechtian verfremdungseffekt. Using the example of Marcus's speech, Reese argues that the audience is disconnected from the violence through the seemingly incongruent descriptions of that violence. Such language serves to "further emphasise the artificiality of the play; in a sense, they suggest to the audience that it is hearing a poem read rather than seeing the events of that poem put into dramatic form". Gillian Kendall, however, reaches the opposite conclusion, arguing that rhetorical devices such as metaphor augment the violent imagery, not diminish it, because the figurative use of certain words complements their literal counterparts. This, however, "disrupts the way the audience perceives imagery." An example of this is seen in the body politic/dead body imagery early in the play, as the two images soon become interchangeable. Another theory is provided by Peter M. Sacks, who argues that the language of the play is marked by "an artificial and heavily emblematic style, and above all a revoltingly grotesque series of horrors which seem to have little function but to ironise man's inadequate expressions of pain and loss".

== Performance ==
The earliest definite recorded performance of Titus was on 24 January 1594, when Philip Henslowe noted a performance by Sussex's Men of Titus & ondronicus. Although Henslowe does not specify a theatre, it was most likely The Rose. Repeated performances were staged on 28 January and 6 February. On 5 and 12 June, Henslowe recorded two further performances of the play, at the Newington Butts Theatre by the combined Admiral's Men and Lord Chamberlain's Men. The 24 January show earned three pounds eight shillings, and the performances on 29 January and 6 February earned two pounds each, making it the most profitable play of the season. The next recorded performance was on 1 January 1596, when a troupe of London actors, possibly Chamberlain's Men, performed the play during the Christmas festivities at Burley-on-the-Hill in the manor of Sir John Harington, Baron of Exton.

Some scholars, however, have suggested that the January 1594 performance may not be the first recorded performance of the play. On 11 April 1592, Henslowe recorded ten performances by Derby's Men of a play called Titus and Vespasian, which some, such as E. K. Chambers, have identified with Shakespeare's play. Most scholars, however, believe that Titus and Vespasian is more likely a different play about the two real life Roman Emperors, Vespasian, who ruled from 69 to 79, and his son Titus, who ruled from 79 to 81. The two were subjects of many narratives at the time, and a play about them would not have been unusual. Dover Wilson further argues that the theory that Titus and Vespasian is Titus Andronicus probably originated in an 1865 English translation of a 1620 German translation of Titus, in which Lucius had been renamed Vespasian.

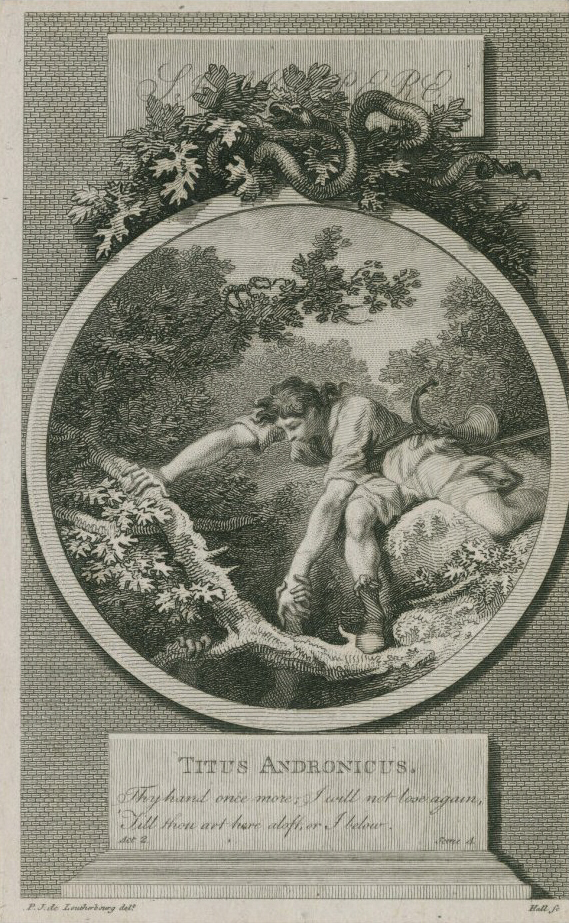
Philip James de Loutherbourg illustration of Quintus trying to help Martius from the hole in Act 2, Scene 3; engraved by Hall (1785)

Although it is known that the play was definitely popular in its day, there is no other recorded performance for many years. In January 1668, it was listed by the Lord Chamberlain as one of twenty-one plays owned by the King's Company which had, at some stage previously, been acted at Blackfriars Theatre; "A Catalogue of part of his Ma^{tes} Servants Playes as they were formally acted at the Blackfryers & now allowed of to his Ma^{tes} Servants at y^{e} New Theatre." However, no other information is provided. During the late seventeenth, eighteenth and nineteenth centuries, adaptations of the play came to dominate the stage, and after the Burley performance in 1596 and the possible Blackfriars performance some time prior to 1667, there is no definite recorded performance of the Shakespearean text in England until the early twentieth century.

After over 300 years absence from the English stage, the play returned on 8 October 1923, in a production directed by Robert Atkins at The Old Vic, as part of the Vic's presentation of the complete dramatic works over a seven-year period. The production featured Wilfred Walter as Titus, Florence Saunders as Tamora, George Hayes as Aaron and Jane Bacon as Lavinia. Reviews at the time praised Hayes' performance but criticised Walter's as monotonous. Atkins staged the play with a strong sense of Elizabethan theatrical authenticity, with a plain black backdrop, and a minimum of props. Critically, the production met with mixed reviews, some welcoming the return of the original play to the stage, some questioning why Atkins had bothered when various adaptations were much better and still extant. Nevertheless, the play was a huge box office success, one of the most successful in the Complete Works presentation.

The earliest known performance of the Shakespearean text in the United States was in April 1924 when the Alpha Delta Phi fraternity of Yale University staged the play under the direction of John M. Berdan and E. M. Woolley as part of a double bill with Robert Greene's Friar Bacon and Friar Bungay. While some material was removed from 3.2, 3.3 and 3.4, the rest of the play was left intact, with much attention devoted to the violence and gore. The cast list for this production has been lost.

The best known and most successful production of the play in England was directed by Peter Brook for the RSC at the Royal Shakespeare Theatre in 1955, starring Laurence Olivier as Titus, Maxine Audley as Tamora, Anthony Quayle as Aaron and Vivien Leigh as Lavinia. Brook had been offered the chance to direct Macbeth but had controversially turned it down, and instead decided to stage Titus. The media predicted that the production would be a massive failure, and possibly spell the end of Brook's career, but on the contrary, it was a huge commercial and critical success, with many of the reviews arguing that Brook's alterations improved Shakespeare's script (Marcus's lengthy speech upon discovering Lavinia was removed and some of the scenes in Act 4 were reorganised). Olivier in particular was singled out for his performance and for making Titus a truly sympathetic character. J. C. Trewin for example, wrote "the actor had thought himself into the hell of Titus; we forgot the inadequacy of the words in the spell of the projection." The production is also noted for muting the violence: Chiron and Demetrius were killed off stage; the heads of Quintus and Martius were never seen; the nurse is strangled, not stabbed; Titus's hand was never seen; blood and wounds were symbolised by red ribbons. Edward Trostle Jones summed up the style of the production as employing "stylised distancing effects". The scene where Lavinia first appears after the rape was singled out by critics as being especially horrific, with her wounds portrayed by red streamers hanging from her wrists and mouth. Some reviewers however, found the production too beautified, making it unrealistic, with several commenting on the cleanness of Lavinia's face after her tongue has supposedly been cut out. After its hugely successful Royal Shakespeare Theatre run, the play went on tour around Europe in 1957. No video recordings of the production are known, although there are many photographs available.

The success of the Brook production seems to have provided an impetus for directors to tackle the play, and ever since 1955, there has been a steady stream of performances on the English and American stages. After Brook, the next major production came in 1967, when Douglas Seale directed an extremely graphic and realistic presentation at the Centre Stage in Baltimore with costumes that recalled the various combatants in World War II. Seale's production employed a strong sense of theatrical realism to make parallels between the contemporary period and that of Titus, and thus comment on the universality of violence and revenge. Seale set the play in the 1940s and made pointed parallels with concentration camps, the massacre at Katyn, the Nuremberg Rallies and the Hiroshima and Nagasaki bombings. Saturninus was based on Benito Mussolini and all his followers dressed entirely in black; Titus was modelled after a Prussian Army officer; the Andronici wore Nazi insignia and the Goths at the end of the play were dressed in Allied Forces uniforms; the murders in the last scene are all carried out by gunfire, and at the end of the play swastikas rained down onto the stage. The play received mixed reviews with many critics wondering why Seale had chosen to associate the Andronici with Nazism, arguing that it created a mixed metaphor.

Later in 1967, as a direct reaction to Seale's realistic production, Gerald Freedman directed a performance for Joseph Papp's Shakespeare Festival at the Delacorte Theater in Central Park, Manhattan, starring Jack Hollander as Titus, Olympia Dukakis as Tamora, Moses Gunn as Aaron and Erin Martin as Lavinia. Freedman had seen Seale's production and felt it failed because it worked by "bringing into play our sense of reality in terms of detail and literal time structure". He argued that when presented realistically, the play simply does not work, as it raises too many practical questions, such as why does Lavinia not bleed to death, why does Marcus not take her to the hospital immediately, why does Tamora not notice that the pie tastes unusual, exactly how do both Martius and Quintus manage to fall into a hole? Freedman argued that "if one wants to create a fresh emotional response to the violence, blood and multiple mutilations of Titus Andronicus, one must shock the imagination and subconscious with visual images that recall the richness and depth of primitive rituals." As such, the costumes were purposely designed to represent no particular time or place but were instead based on those of the Byzantine Empire and feudal Japan. Additionally, the violence was stylised; instead of swords and daggers, wands were used and no contact was ever made. The colour scheme was hallucinatory, changing mid-scene. Characters wore classic masks of comedy and tragedy. The slaughter in the final scene was accomplished symbolically by having each character wrapped in a red robe as they died. A narrator (Charles Dance) was also used, who, prior to each act, would announce what was going to happen in the upcoming act, thus undercutting any sense of realism. The production received generally positive reviews, with Mildred Kuner arguing "Symbolism rather than gory realism was what made this production so stunning."

In 1972, Trevor Nunn directed an RSC production at the Royal Shakespeare Theatre, as part of a presentation of the four Roman plays, starring Colin Blakely as Titus, Margaret Tyzack as Tamora, Calvin Lockhart as Aaron and Janet Suzman as Lavinia. Colin Blakely and John Wood as a vicious and maniacal Saturninus received particularly positive reviews. This production took the realistic approach and did not shirk from the more specific aspects of the violence; for example, Lavinia has trouble walking after the rape, which, it is implied, was anal rape. Nunn believed the play asked profound questions about the sustainability of Elizabethan society, and as such, he linked the play to the contemporary period to ask the same questions of late twentieth-century England; he was "less concerned with the condition of ancient Rome than with the morality of contemporary life". In his program notes, Nunn wrote "Shakespeare's Elizabethan nightmare has become ours." He was especially interested in the theory that decadence had led to the collapse of Rome. At the end of 4.2, for example, there was an on-stage orgy, and throughout the play, supporting actors appeared in the backgrounds dancing, eating, drinking and behaving outrageously. Also in this vein, the play opened with a group of people paying homage to a waxwork of an obese emperor reclining on a couch and clutching a bunch of grapes.

The play was performed for the first time at the Stratford Shakespeare Festival in Ontario, Canada in 1978, when it was directed by Brian Bedford, starring William Hutt as Titus, Jennifer Phipps as Tamora, Alan Scarfe as Aaron and Domini Blithe as Lavinia. Bedford went with neither stylisation nor realism; instead the violence simply tended to happen off-stage, but everything else was realistically presented. The play received mixed reviews with some praising its restraint and others arguing that the suppression of the violence went too far. Many cited the final scene, where despite three onstage stabbings, not one drop of blood was visible, and the reveal of Lavinia, where she was totally bloodless despite her mutilation. This production cut Lucius's final speech and instead ended with Aaron alone on the stage as Sibyl predicts the fall of Rome in lines written by Bedford himself. As such, "for affirmation and healing under Lucius the production substituted a sceptical modern theme of evil triumphant and Rome's decadence."

A celebrated, and unedited production, (according to Jonathan Bate, not a single line from Q1 was cut) was directed by Deborah Warner in 1987 at The Swan and remounted at Barbican's Pit in 1988 for the RSC, starring Brian Cox as Titus, Estelle Kohler as Tamora, Peter Polycarpou as Aaron and Sonia Ritter as Lavinia. Met with almost universally positive reviews, Jonathan Bate regards it as the finest production of any Shakespearean play of the entire 1980s. Using a small cast, Warner had her actors address the audience from time to time throughout the play and often had actors leave the stage and wander out into the auditorium. Opting for a realist presentation, the play had a warning posted in the pit "This play contains scenes which some people may find disturbing", and numerous critics noted how, after the interval at many shows, empty seats had appeared in the audience. Warner's production was considered so successful, both critically and commercially, that the RSC did not stage the play again until 2003.

In 1988, Mark Rucker directed a realistic production at Shakespeare Santa Cruz, starring J. Kenneth Campbell as Titus, Molly Maycock as Tamora, Elizabeth Atkeson as Lavinia, and an especially well-received performance by Bruce A. Young as Aaron. Campbell presented Titus in a much more sympathetic light than usual; for example, he kills Mutius by accident, pushing him so that he falls against a tree, and his refusal to allow Mutius to be buried was performed as if in a dream state. Prior to the production, Rucker had Young work out and get in shape so that by the time of the performance, he weighed 240 lbs. Standing at six-foot four, his Aaron was purposely designed to be the most physically imposing character on the stage. Additionally, he was often positioned as standing on hills and tables, with the rest of the cast below him. When he appears with the Goths, he is not their prisoner, but willingly enters their camp in pursuit of his baby, the implication being that without this one weakness, he would have been invincible.

In 1994, Julie Taymor directed the play at the Theater for the New City. The production featured a prologue and epilogue set in the modern era, foregrounded the character of Young Lucius, who acts as a kind of choric observer of events, and starred Robert Stattel as Titus, Melinda Mullins as Tamora, Harry Lennix as Aaron and Miriam Healy-Louie as Lavinia. Heavily inspired in her design by Joel-Peter Witkin, Taymor used stone columns to represent the people of Rome, who she saw as silent and incapable of expressing any individuality or subjectivity. Controversially, the play ended with the implication that Lucius had killed Aaron's baby, despite his vow not to.

In 1995, Gregory Doran directed a production at the Royal National Theatre, which also played at the Market Theatre in Johannesburg, South Africa, starring Antony Sher as Titus, Dorothy Ann Gould as Tamora, Sello Maake as Aaron and Jennifer Woodbine as Lavinia. Although Doran explicitly denied any political overtones, the play was set in a modern African context and made explicit parallels to South African politics. In his production notes, which Doran co-wrote with Sher, he stated, "Surely, to be relevant, theatre must have an umbilical connection to the lives of the people watching it." One particularly controversial decision was to have the play spoken in indigenous accents rather than Received Pronunciation, which allegedly resulted in many white South Africans refusing to see the play. Writing in Plays International in August 1995, Robert Lloyd Parry argued "the questions raised by Titus went far beyond the play itself [to] many of the tensions that exist in the new South Africa; the gulf of mistrust that still exists between blacks and whites ... Titus Andronicus has proved itself to be political theatre in the truest sense."

For the first time since 1987, the RSC staged the play in 2003, under the direction of Bill Alexander and starring David Bradley as Titus, Maureen Beattie as Tamora, Joe Dixon as Aron and Eve Myles as Lavinia. Convinced that Act 1 was by George Peele, Alexander felt he was not undermining the integrity of Shakespeare by drastically altering it; for example, Saturninus and Tamora are present throughout, they never leave the stage; there is no division between the upper and lower levels; all mention of Mutius is absent; and over 100 lines were removed.

Laura Rees as Lavinia in Lucy Bailey's 2006 production at Shakespeare's Globe; note the 'realistic' effects and blood

In 2006, two major productions were staged within a few weeks of one another. The first opened on 29 May at Shakespeare's Globe, directed by Lucy Bailey and starring Douglas Hodge as Titus, Geraldine Alexander as Tamora, Shaun Parkes as Aaron and Laura Rees as Lavinia. Bailey focused on a realistic presentation throughout the production; for example, after her mutilation, Lavinia is covered from head to toe in blood, with her stumps crudely bandaged, and raw flesh visible beneath. So graphic was Bailey's use of realism that at several productions, audience members fainted upon Lavinia's appearance. The production was also controversial insofar as the Globe had a roof installed for the first time in its history. The decision was taken by designer William Dudley, who took as his inspiration a feature of the Colosseum known as a velarium – a cooling system which consisted of a canvas-covered, net-like structure made of ropes, with a hole in the centre. Dudley made it as a PVC awning which was intended to darken the auditorium.

Hitomi Manaka as Lavinia in Yukio Ninagawa's 2006 production at the Royal Shakespeare Theatre; note the use of red ribbons as a stylised substitute for blood

The second 2006 production opened at the Royal Shakespeare Theatre on 9 June as part of the Complete Works Festival. Directed by Yukio Ninagawa, it starred Kotaro Yoshida as Titus, Rei Asami as Tamora, Shun Oguri as Aaron and Hitomi Manaka as Lavinia. Performed in Japanese, the original English text was projected as surtitles onto the back of the stage. In stark contrast to Bailey's production, theatricality was emphasised; the play begins with the company still rehearsing and getting into costume and the stage hands still putting the sets together. The production followed the 1955 Brook production in its depiction of violence; actress Hitomi Manaka appeared after the rape scene with stylised red ribbons coming from her mouth and arms, substituting for blood. Throughout the play, at the back of the stage, a huge marble wolf can be seen from which feed Romulus and Remus, with the implication being that Rome is a society based on animalistic origins. The play ends with Young Lucius holding Aaron's baby out to the audience and crying out "The horror! The horror!"

Several reviews of the time made much of the manner in which each production approached the appearance of Lavinia after the rape: "At Shakespeare's Globe, the groundlings are fainting at the mutilations in Lucy Bailey's coarse but convincing production. To Stratford-upon-Avon, Yukio Ninagawa brings a Japanese staging so stylised that it keeps turning the horror into visual poetry." Speaking of Bailey's production, Eleanor Collins of Cahiers Élisabéthains, said of the scene, "audience members turned their heads away in real distress". Charles Spencer of The Daily Telegraph called Lavinia "almost too ghastly to behold". Michael Billington of The Guardian said her slow shuffle onto the stage "chills the blood". Sam Marlowe of The Times saw Bailey's use of realism as extremely important for the moral of the production as a whole: "violated, her hands and her tongue cruelly cut away, she stumbles into view drenched in blood, flesh dangling from her hacked wrists, moaning and keening, almost animalistic. It's the production's most powerful symbolic image, redolent of the dehumanising effects of war." Of Ninagawa's production, some critics felt the use of stylisation damaged the impact of the scene. Benedict Nightingale of The Times, for example, asked "is it enough to suggest bloodletting by having red ribbons flow from wrists and throats?" Similarly, The Guardian's Michael Billington, who had praised Bailey's use of realistic effects, wrote "At times I felt that Ninagawa, through stylised images and Handelian music, unduly aestheticised violence." Some critics, however, felt the stylisation was more powerful than Bailey's realism; Neil Allan and Scott Revers of Cahiers Élisabéthains, for example, wrote "Blood itself was denoted by spools of red thread spilling from garments, limbs and Lavinia's mouth. Cruelty was stylised; the visceral became the aesthetic." Similarly, Paul Taylor, writing for The Independent, wrote "Gore is represented by swatches of red cords that tumble and trail from wounded wrists and mouths. You might think that this method had a cushioning effect. In fact it concentrates and heightens the horror." Ninagawa himself said "The violence is all there. I am just trying to express these things in a different way from any previous production." In her 2013 essay, "Mythological Reconfigurations on the Contemporary Stage: Giving a New Voice to Philomela in Titus Andronicus", which directly compares the depictions of the two Lavinias, Agnès Lafont writes of Ninagawa's production that Lavinia's appearance functions as a "visual emblem": "Bloodshed and beauty create a stark dissonance ... Distancing itself from the violence it stages thanks to 'dissonance', the production presents Lavinia onstage as if she were a painting ... Ninagawa's work distances itself from cruelty, as the spectacle of suffering is stylised. Ribbons that represent blood ... are symbolic means of filtering the aching spectacle of an abused daughter, and yet the spectacle retains its shocking potential and its power of empathy all the while intellectualizing it."

In 2007, Gale Edwards directed a production for the Shakespeare Theatre Company at the Harman Center for the Arts, starring Sam Tsoutsouvas as Titus, Valerie Leonard as Tamora, Colleen Delany as Lavinia, and Peter Macon as Aaron. Set in an unspecific modern milieu, props were kept to a minimum, with lighting and general staging kept simple, as Edwards wanted the audience to concentrate on the story, not the staging. The production received generally very favourable reviews.

In 2011, Michael Sexton directed a modern military dress production at The Public Theater on a minimalistic set made of plywood boards. The production had a low budget and much of it was spent on huge volumes of blood that literally drenched the actors in the final scene, as Sexton said he was determined to outdo his contemporaries in terms of the amount of on-stage blood in the play. The production starred Jay O. Sanders (who was nominated for a Lucille Lortel) as Titus, Stephanie Roth Haberle as Tamora, Ron Cephas Jones as Aaron and Jennifer Ikeda as Lavinia.

In 2013, Michael Fentiman directed the play for the Royal Shakespeare Company, with Stephen Boxer as Titus, Katy Stephens as Tamora, Kevin Harvey as Aaron, and Rose Reynolds as Lavinia. Emphasising the gore and violence, the production carried a trailer with warnings of "graphic imagery and scenes of butchery". It played at The Swan until October 2013. Also in 2013, the Hudson Shakespeare Company staged a production directed by Jon Ciccarelli as part of a special Halloween festival for the Historic Jersey City and Harsimus Cemetery. The production contrasted a military and modern Goth culture, but quickly disintegrated into an anarchic state, stressing the black comedy of the play.

Outside Britain and the United States, other significant productions include Qiping Xu's 1986 production in China, which drew political parallels to Mao Zedong's Cultural Revolution and the Red Guards; Peter Stein's 1989 production in Italy which evoked images of twentieth century Fascism; Daniel Mesguich's 1989 production in Paris, which set the entire play in a crumbling library, acting as a symbol for Roman civilisation; Nenni Delmestre's 1992 production in Zagreb which acted as a metaphor for the struggles of the Croatian people; and Silviu Purcărete's 1992 Romanian production, which explicitly avoided using the play as a metaphor for the fall of Nicolae Ceaușescu (this production is one of the most successful plays ever staged in Romania, and it was revived every year up to 1997).

== Adaptations ==
=== Plays ===
The first known adaptation of the play originated in the later years of the sixteenth century. In 1620, a German publication entitled Englische Comedien und Tragedien contained a play called Eine sehr klägliche Tragaedia von Tito Andronico und der hoffertigen Käyserin darinnen denckwürdige actiones zubefinden (A most lamentable tragedy of Titus Andronicus and the haughty empress, wherein are found memorable events). Transcribed by Frederick Menius, the play was a version of Titus performed by Robert Browne and John Greene's group of travelling players. The overriding plot of Tito Andronico is identical to Titus, but all the character names are different, with the exception of Titus himself. Written in prose, the play does not feature the fly killing scene (3.2), Bassianus does not oppose Saturninus for the throne, Alarbus is absent, Quintus and Mutius are only seen after their death, many of the classical and mythological allusions have been removed; stage directions are much more elaborate, for example, in the banquet scene, Titus is described as wearing blood-soaked rags and carrying a butcher's knife dripping with blood.

Another European adaptation came in 1637, when Dutch dramatist Jan Vos wrote a version of the play entitled Aran en Titus, which was published in 1641, and republished in 1642, 1644, 1648 and 1649, illustrating its popularity. The play may have been based on a 1621 work, now lost, by Adriaen Van den Bergh, which may itself have been a composite of the English Titus and the German Tito Andronico. Vos' play focuses on Aaron, who, in the final scene, is burned alive on stage, beginning a tradition amongst adaptations of foregrounding the Moor and ending the play with his death.

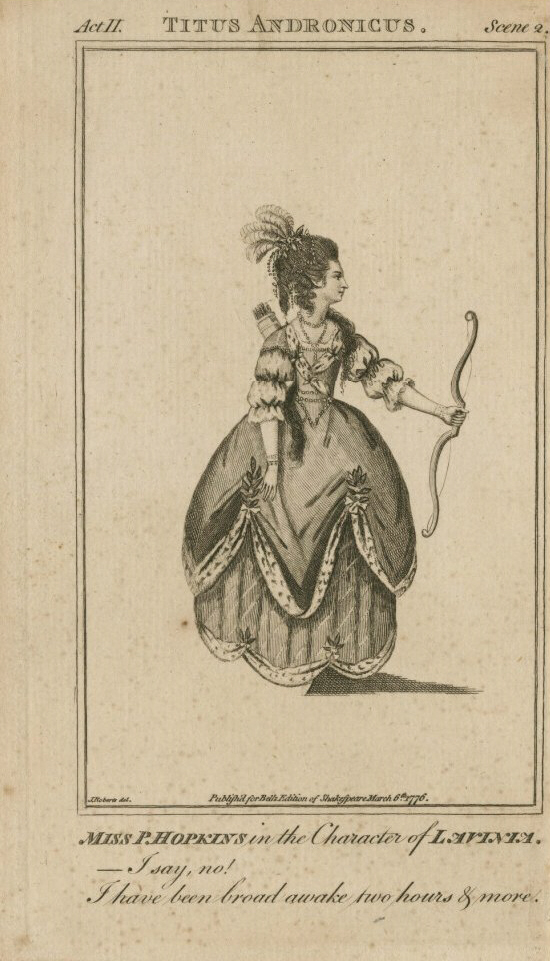
Miss P. Hopkins as Lavinia in Ravenscroft's The Rape of Lavinia, from John Bell's edition of Shakespeare (1776)

The earliest English language adaptation was in 1678 at Drury Lane, by Edward Ravenscroft: Titus Andronicus, or the Rape of Lavinia. A Tragedy, Alter'd from Mr. Shakespeares Works, probably with Thomas Betterton as Titus and Samuel Sandford as Aaron. In his preface, Ravenscroft wrote "Compare the Old Play with this you'l finde that none in all that Authors Works ever receiv'd greater Alterations or Additions, the language not only Refin'd, but many Scenes entirely New: Besides most of the principal Characters heighten'd and the Plot much incresas'd." The play was a huge success and was revived in 1686, and published the following year. It was revived again in 1704 and 1717. The 1717 revival was especially successful, starring John Mills as Titus, Mrs. Giffard as Tamora, James Quin as Aaron, and John Thurmond as Saturninus. The play was revived again in 1718 and 1719 (with John Bickerstaff as Aaron) and 1721 (with Thomas Walker in the role). Quin had left Drury Lane in 1718 and gone to Lincoln's Inn Fields, which was owned by John Rich. Rich's actors had little Shakespearean experience, and Quin was soon advertised as the main attraction. In 1718, the adaptation was presented twice at Lincoln, both times with Quin as Aaron. In the 1720–1721 season, the play earned £81 with three performances. Quin became synonymous with the role of Aaron, and in 1724 he chose the adaptation as the play to be performed at his benefit.

Ravenscroft made drastic alterations to the play. He removed all of 2.2 (preparing for the hunt), 3.2 (the fly killing scene), 4.3 (firing the arrows and sending the clown to Saturninus) and 4.4 (the execution of the clown). Much of the violence was toned down; for example both the murder of Chiron and Demetrius and Titus's amputation take place off stage. A significant change in the first scene, and one with major implications for the rest of the play, is that prior to the sacrifice of Alarbus, it is revealed that several years previously, Tamora had one of Titus's sons in captivity and refused to show him clemency despite Titus's pleas. Aaron has a much larger role in Ravenscroft than in Shakespeare, especially in Act 1, where lines originally assigned to Demetrius and Tamora are given to him. Tamora does not give birth during the action, but earlier, with the baby secretly kept by a nurse. To maintain the secret, Aaron kills the nurse, and it is the nurse's husband, not Lucius, who captures Aaron as he leaves Rome with the child. Additionally, Lucius's army is not composed of Goths, but of Roman centurions loyal to the Andronici. The last act is also considerably longer; Tamora and Saturninus both have lengthy speeches after their fatal stabbings. Tamora asks for her child to be brought to her, but she stabs it immediately upon receiving it. Aaron laments that Tamora has now outdone him in evil; "She has out-done me in my own Art –/Out-done me in Murder – Kille'd her own Child./Give it me – I'le eat it." He is burned alive as the climax of the play.

In January and February 1839 an adaptation written and directed by and also starring Nathaniel Bannister was performed for four nights at the Walnut Street Theatre in Philadelphia. The playbill had a note reading "The manager, in announcing this play, adapted by N. H. Bannister from the language of Shakespeare alone, assures the public that every expression calculated to offend the ear, has been studiously avoided, and the play is presented for their decision with full confidence that it will merit approbation." In his History of the Philadelphia Stage, Volume IV (1878), Charles Durang wrote, "Bannister ably preserved the beauties of its poetry, the intensity of its incidents, and excluded the horrors with infinite skill, yet preserved all the interest of the drama." Nothing else is known about this production.

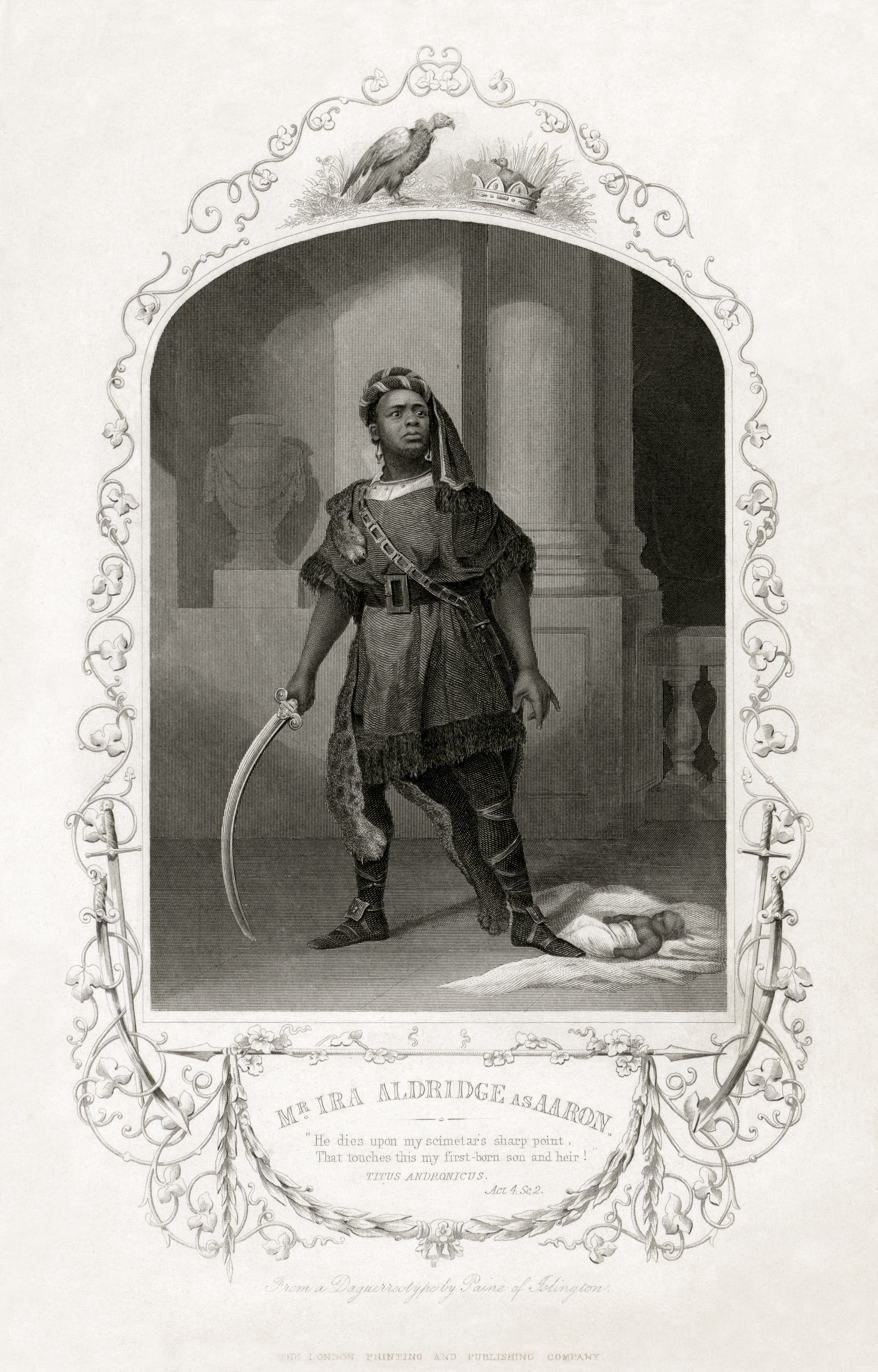
African–American actor Ira Aldridge as Aaron, c. 1852

The most successful adaptation of the play in Britain premiered in 1850, written by Ira Aldridge and C. A. Somerset. Aaron was rewritten to make him the hero of the piece (played by Aldridge), the rape and mutilation of Lavinia were removed, Tamora (Queen of Scythia) became chaste and honourable, with Aaron as her friend only, and Chiron and Demetrius act only out of love for their mother. Only Saturninus is a truly evil character. Towards the end of the play, Saturninus has Aaron chained to a tree, and his baby flung into the Tiber. Aaron frees himself however and leaps into the river after the child. At the end, Saturninus poisons Aaron, but as Aaron dies, Lavinia promises to look after his child for him, due to his saving her from rape earlier in the piece. An entire scene from Zaraffa, the Slave King, a play written specifically for Aldridge in Dublin in 1847, was included in this adaptation. After the initial performances, Aldridge kept the play in the repertoire, and it was extremely successful at the box office and continued to be staged in England, Ireland, Scotland and Wales until at least 1857, when it received a glowing review from The Sunday Times on 26 April. It was generally agreed amongst reviewers of the period that the Aldridge/Somerset rewrite was considerably superior to Shakespeare's original. For example, The Era reviewer wrote,

The deflowerment of Lavinia, cutting out her tongue, chopping off her hands, and the numerous decapitations which occur in the original, are wholly omitted, and a play not only presentable but actually attractive is the result. Aaron is elevated into a noble and lofty character; Tamora, the queen of Scythia, is a chaste though decidedly strong-minded female, and her connection with the Moor appears to be of legitimate description; her sons Chiron and Demetrius are dutiful children, obeying the behests of their mother. Thus altered, Mr. Aldridge's conception of the part of Aaron is excellent – gentle and impassioned by turns; now burning with jealousy as he doubts the honour of the Queen; anon, fierce with rage, as he reflects upon the wrongs which have been done him – the murder of Alarbus and the abduction of his son; and then all tenderness and emotion in the gentler passages with his infant.

The next adaptation was in 1951, when Kenneth Tynan and Peter Myers staged a thirty-five-minute version entitled Andronicus as part of a Grand Guignol presentation at the Irving Theatre. Produced in the tradition of Theatre of Cruelty, the production edited together all of the violent scenes, emphasised the gore, and removed Aaron entirely. In a review in the Sunday Times on 11 November, Harold Hobson wrote the stage was full of "practically the whole company waving gory stumps and eating cannibal pies".

In 1957 the Old Vic staged a heavily edited ninety-minute performance as part of a double bill with an edited version of The Comedy of Errors. Directed by Walter Hudd, both plays were performed by the same company of actors, with Derek Godfrey as Titus, Barbara Jefford as Tamora, Margaret Whiting as Lavinia and Robert Helpmann as Saturninus. Performed in the manner of a traditional Elizabethan production, the play received mixed reviews. The Times, for example, felt that the juxtaposition of the blood tragedy and the frothy comedy was "ill-conceived".

In 1970, Swiss dramatist Friedrich Dürrenmatt adapted the play into a German language comedy entitled Titus Andronicus: Komödie nach Shakespeare (Titus Andronicus: Comedy After Shakespeare). Of the adaptation he wrote "it represents an attempt to render Shakespeare's early chaotic work fit for the German stage without having the Shakespearean atrocities and grotesqueries passed over in silence." Working from a translation of the First Folio text by Wolf Graf von Baudissin, Dürrenmatt altered much of the dialogue and changed elements of the plot; the fly killing scene (3.2) and the interrogation of Aaron (5.1) were removed; Titus has Aaron cut off his hand, and after he realises he has been tricked, Marcus brings Lavinia to him rather than the other way around as in the original play. Another major change is that after Aaron is presented with his love child, he flees Rome immediately, and successfully, and is never heard from again. Dürrenmatt also added a new scene, where Lucius arrives at the Goth camp and persuades their leader, Alarich, to help him. At the end of the play, after Lucius has stabbed Saturninus, but before he has given his final speech, Alarich betrays him, kills him, and orders his army to destroy Rome and kill everyone in it.

In 1981, John Barton followed the 1957 Old Vic model and directed a heavily edited version of the play as a double bill with The Two Gentlemen of Verona for the RSC, starring Patrick Stewart as Titus, Sheila Hancock as Tamora, Hugh Quarshie as Aaron and Leonie Mellinger as Lavinia. Theatricality and falseness were emphasised, and when actors were off stage, they could be seen at the sides of the stage watching the performance. The production received lukewarm reviews, and had an average box office.

In 1984, German playwright Heiner Müller adapted the play into Anatomie Titus: Fall of Rome. Ein Shakespearekommentar (Anatomy Titus: Fall of Rome. A Shakespearean Commentary). Interspersing the dialogue with a chorus like commentary, the adaptation was heavily political and made reference to numerous twentieth century events, such as the rise of the Third Reich, Stalinism, the erection of the Berlin Wall and the attendant emigration and defection issues, and the 1973 Chilean coup d'état. Müller removed the entire first act, replacing it was a narrated introduction, and completely rewrote the final act. He described the work as "terrorist in nature", and foregrounded the violence; for example Lavinia is brutally raped on stage and Aaron takes several hacks at Titus's hand before amputating it. First performed at the Schauspielhaus Bochum, it was directed by Manfred Karge and Matthias Langhoff, and is still regularly revived in Germany.

In 1989, Jeanette Lambermont directed a heavily edited kabuki version of the play at the Stratford Shakespeare Festival, in a double bill with The Comedy of Errors, starring Nicholas Pennell as Titus, Goldie Semple as Tamora, Hubert Baron Kelly as Aaron and Lucy Peacock as Lavinia.

In 2005, German playwright Botho Strauß adapted the play into Schändung: nach dem Titus Andronicus von Shakespeare (Rape: After Titus Andronicus by Shakespeare), also commonly known by its French name, Viol, d'après Titus Andronicus de William Shakespeare. Set in both a contemporary and an ancient world predating the Roman Empire, the adaptation begins with a group of salesmen trying to sell real estate; gated communities which they proclaim as "Terra Secura", where women and children are secure from "theft, rape and kidnapping". Mythology is important in the adaptation; Venus is represented as governing nature, but is losing her power to the melancholic and uninterested Saturn, leading to a society rampant with Bedeutungslosigkeit (lack of meaning, insignificance). Written in prose rather than blank verse, changes to the text include the rape of Lavinia being Tamora's idea instead of Aaron's; the removal of Marcus; Titus does not kill his son; he does not have his hand amputated; Chiron is much more subservient to Demetrius; Aaron is more philosophical, trying to find meaning in his acts of evil rather than simply revelling in them; Titus does not die at the end, nor does Tamora, although the play ends with Titus ordering the deaths of Tamora and Aaron.

In 2008, Müller's Anatomie Titus was translated into English by Julian Hammond and performed at the Cremorne Theatre in Brisbane, the Canberra Theatre, the Playhouse in the Sydney Opera House and the Malthouse Theatre, Melbourne by the Bell Shakespeare Company and the Queensland Theatre Company. Directed by Michael Gow and with an all-male cast, it starred John Bell as Titus, Peter Cook as Tamora, Timothy Walter as Aaron and Thomas Campbell as Lavinia. Racism was a major theme in this production, with Aaron initially wearing a gorilla mask, and then poorly applied blackface, and his baby 'played' by a golliwogg.

In 2012, as part of the Globe to Globe Festival at Shakespeare's Globe, the play was performed under the title Titus 2.0. Directed by Tang Shu-wing, it starred Andy Ng Wai-shek as Titus, Ivy Pang Ngan-ling as Tamora, Chu Pak-hong as Aaron and Lai Yuk-ching as Lavinia. Performed entirely in Cantonese, from an original script by Cancer Chong, the play had originally been staged in Hong Kong in 2009. The production took a minimalist approach and featured very little blood (after Lavinia has her hands cut off, for example, she simply wears red gloves for the rest of the play). The production features a narrator throughout, who speaks both in first person and third person, sometimes directly to the audience, sometimes to other characters on the stage. The role of the narrator alternates throughout the play, but is always performed by a member of the main cast. The production received excellent reviews, both in its original Hong Kong incarnation, and when restaged at the Globe.

In 2014, Noelle Fair and Lisa LaGrande adapted the play into Interpreting her Martyr'd Signs, the title of which is taken from Titus's claim to be able to understand the mute Lavinia. Focusing on the backstories of Tamora and Lavinia, the play is set in Purgatory shortly after their deaths, where they find themselves in a waiting area with Aaron as their salvation or damnation is decided upon. As they try to come to terms with their unresolved conflict, Aaron serves as a master of ceremonies, initiating a dialogue between them, leading to a series of flashbacks to their lives prior to the beginning of the play.

Gary: A Sequel to Titus Andronicus, an absurdist comic play by Taylor Mac and directed by George C. Wolfe, began previews at the Booth Theatre on Broadway on 11 March 2019 with an opening of 21 April 2019. The cast included Nathan Lane, Kristine Nielsen, and Julie White and involved servants tasked with cleaning up the carnage from the original play.

=== Musicals ===
Titus Andronicus: The Musical!, written by Brian Colonna, Erik Edborg, Hannah Duggan, Erin Rollman, Evan Weissman, Matt Petraglia, and Samantha Schmitz, was staged by the Buntport Theater Company in Denver, Colorado four times between 2002 and 2007. Staged as a band of travelling thespian players who are attempting to put on a serious production of Titus, and starring Brian Colonna as Titus, Erin Rollman as Tamora (and Marcus), Hannah Duggan as both Aaron and Lavinia (when playing Aaron she wore a fake moustache), Erik Edborg as Lucius and Saturninus, and Evan Weissman as Someone Who Will Probably Die (he is killed over thirty times during the play). The piece was very much a farce, and included such moments as Lavinia singing an aria to the tune of "Oops!...I Did It Again" by Britney Spears, after her tongue has been cut out; Saturninus and Lucius engaged in a sword fight, but both being played by the same actor; Chiron and Demetrius 'played' by a gas can and a car radio respectively; the love child being born with a black moustache. A number of critics felt that the play improved on Shakespeare's original, and several wondered what Harold Bloom would have made of it.

Tragedy! A Musical Comedy, written by Michael Johnson and Mary Davenport was performed at the 2007 New York International Fringe Festival in the Lucille Lortel Theatre. Directed by Johnson, the piece starred Francis Van Wetering as Titus, Alexandra Cirves as Tamora, Roger Casey as Aaron (aka The Evil Black Guy) and Lauren Huyett as Lavinia. Staged as a farce, the production included moments such as Lavinia singing a song entitled "At least I can still sing" after having her hands cut off, but as she reaches the finale, Chiron and Demetrius return and cut out her tongue; Lucius is portrayed as a homosexual in love with Saturninus, and everyone knows except Titus; Titus kills Mutius not because he defies him, but because he discovers that Mutius wants to be a tap dancer instead of a soldier; Bassianus is a transvestite; Saturninus is addicted to prescription medication; and Tamora is a nymphomaniac.

=== Film ===
In 1969, Robert Hartford-Davis planned to make a feature film starring Christopher Lee as Titus and Lesley-Anne Down as Lavinia, but the project never materialised.

The 1973 horror comedy film Theatre of Blood, directed by Douglas Hickox featured a very loose adaptation of the play. Vincent Price stars in the film as Edward Lionheart, who regards himself as the finest Shakespearean actor of all time. When he fails to be awarded the prestigious Critic's Circle Award for Best Actor, he sets about exacting bloody revenge on the critics who gave him poor reviews, with each act inspired by a death in a Shakespeare play. One such act of revenge involves the critic Meredith Merridew (played by Robert Morley). Lionheart abducts Merridew's prized poodles, and bakes them in a pie, which he then feeds to Merridew, before revealing all and force-feeding the critic until he chokes to death.

A 1997 straight-to-video adaptation, which cuts back on the violence, titled Titus Andronicus: The Movie, was directed by Lorn Richey and starred Ross Dippel as Titus, Aldrich Allen as Aaron, and Maureen Moran as Lavinia. Another straight-to-video- adaptation was made in 1998, directed by Christopher Dunne, and starring Robert Reese as Titus, Candy K. Sweet as Tamora, Lexton Raleigh as Aaron, Tom Dennis as Demitrius, with Levi David Tinker as Chiron and Amanda Gezik as Lavinia. This version enhanced the violence and increased the gore. For example, in the opening scene, Alarbus has his face skinned alive, and is then disembowelled and set on fire.

In 1999, Julie Taymor directed an adaptation entitled Titus, starring Anthony Hopkins as Titus, Jessica Lange as Tamora, Harry Lennix as Aaron (reprising his role from Taymor's 1994 theatrical production) and Laura Fraser as Lavinia. As with Taymor's stage production, the film begins with a young boy playing with toy soldiers in his home and being whisked away to a world resembling Ancient Rome, where he assumes the character of young Lucius. A major component of the film is the mixing of the old and modern; Chiron and Demetrius dress like modern rock stars, but the Andronici dress like Roman soldiers; some characters use chariots, some use cars and motorcycles; crossbows and swords are used alongside rifles and pistols; tanks are seen driven by soldiers in ancient Roman garb; bottled beer is seen alongside ancient amphorae of wine; microphones are used to address characters in ancient clothing. According to Taymor, this anachronistic structure was created to emphasise the timelessness of the violence in the film, to suggest that violence is universal to all humanity, at all times: "Costume, paraphernalia, horses or chariots or cars; these represent the essence of a character, as opposed to placing it in a specific time. This is a film that takes place from the year 1 to the year 2000." At the end of the film, young Lucius takes the baby and walks out of Rome back to his era as he reverts to the boy; an image of hope for the future, symbolized by the rising sun in the background. Originally, the film was to end as Taymor's 1994 production had, with the implication that Lucius is going to kill Aaron's baby, but during production of the film, actor Angus Macfadyen, who played Lucius, convinced Taymor that Lucius was an honorable man and wouldn't go back on his word. Lisa S. Starks reads the film as a revisionist horror film and feels that Taymor is herself part of the process of twentieth century re-evaluation of the play: "In adapting a play that has traditionally evoked critical condemnation, Taymor calls into question that judgement, thereby opening up the possibility for new readings and considerations of the play within the Shakespeare canon."

William Shakespeare's Titus Andronicus, directed by Richard Griffin and starring Nigel Gore as Titus, Zoya Pierson as Tamora, Kevin Butler as Aaron and Molly Lloyd as Lavinia, was released direct to video in 2000. Shot on DV in and around Providence, Rhode Island with a budget of $12,000, the film is set in a modern business milieu. Saturninus is a corporate head who has inherited a company from his father, and the Goths feature as contemporary goths.

In 2017, Titus Andronicus was adapted as The Hungry by director Bornilla Chatterjee set in contemporary New Delhi, India. It stars Naseeruddin Shah as Tathagat Ahuja (representing Titus), Tisca Chopra as Tulsi Joshi (representing Tamora), Neeraj Kabi as Arun Kumar (Aaron) and Sayani Gupta as Loveleen Ahuja (Lavinia).

=== Television ===
In 1970, Finnish TV channel Yle TV1 screened an adaptation of the play written and directed by Jukka Sipilä, starring Leo Lastumäki as Titus, Iris-Lilja Lassila as Tamora, Eugene Holman as Aaron and Maija Leino as Lavinia.

In 1985, the BBC produced a version of the play for their BBC Television Shakespeare series. Directed by Jane Howell, the play was the thirty-seventh and final episode of the series and starred Trevor Peacock as Titus, Eileen Atkins as Tamora, Hugh Quarshie as Aaron and Anna Calder-Marshall as Lavinia. Because Titus was broadcast several months after the rest of the seventh season, it was rumoured that the BBC were worried about the violence in the play and that disagreements had arisen about censorship. This was inaccurate however, as the delay was actually caused by a BBC strike in 1984. The episode had been booked into the studio in February and March 1984, but the strike meant it could not shoot. When the strike ended, the studio could not be used as it was being used by another production, and then when the studio became available, the RSC was using Trevor Peacock, and filming did not take place until February 1985, a year later than planned. Initially, director Jane Howell wanted to set the play in present-day Northern Ireland, but she ultimately settled on a more conventional approach. All the body parts seen throughout were based upon real autopsy photographs, and were authenticated by the Royal College of Surgeons. The costumes of the Goths were based on punk outfits, with Chiron and Demetrius specifically based on the band Kiss. For the scene when Chiron and Demetrius are killed, a large carcass is seen hanging nearby; this was a genuine lamb carcass purchased from a kosher butcher and smeared with Vaseline to make it gleam under the studio lighting. In an unusual design choice, Howell had the Roman populace all wear identical generic masks without mouths, so as to convey the idea that the Roman people were faceless and voiceless, as she felt the play depicted a society which "seemed like a society where everyone was faceless except for those in power". The production was one of the most lauded plays of the series and garnered almost universally positive reviews.

Young Lucius stares at the body of Aaron's baby in Jane Howell's adaptation for the BBC Television Shakespeare; in the background, his father is being inaugurated as the new emperor

For the most part, the adaptation followed Q1 exactly (and F1 for 3.2) with some minor alterations. For example, a few lines were cut from various scenes, such as Lavinia's "Ay, for these slips have made him noted long" (2.3.87), thus removing the continuity error regarding the duration of the Goths' residence in Rome. Other examples include Titus's "Ah, wherefore dost thou urge the name of hands,/To bid Aeneas tell the tale twice o'er,/How Troy was burnt and he made miserable?" (3.2.26–28), Marcus's "What, what! The lustful sons of Tamora/Performers of this heinous, bloody deed" (4.1.78–79), and Titus and Marcus's brief conversation about Taurus and Aries (4.3.68–75). The adaptation also includes some lines from Q1 which were removed in subsequent editions; at 1.1.35 Titus's "bearing his valiant sons/in coffins from the field" continues with "and at this day,/To the Monument of that Andronicy/Done sacrifice of expiation,/And slaine the Noblest prisoner of the Gothes." These lines are usually omitted because they create a continuity problem regarding the sacrifice of Alarbus, which has not happened yet in the text. However, Howell got around this problem by beginning the play at 1.1.64 – the entrance of Titus. Then, at 1.1.168, after the sacrifice of Alarbus, lines 1.1.1 to 1.1.63 (the introductions of Bassianus and Saturninus) take place, thus Titus's reference to Alarbus's sacrifice makes chronological sense.

Another notable stylistic technique used in the adaptation is multiple addresses direct to camera. For example, Saturninus's "How well the tribune speaks to calm my thoughts" (1.1.46); Tamora's vow to slaughter the Andronici at 1.1.450–455 (thus absolving Saturninus from any involvement); Aaron's soliloquy in 2.1; Aaron's "Ay, and as good as Saturninus may" (2.1.91); Aaron's soliloquy in 2.3; Tamora's "Now will I hence to seek my lovely Moor,/And let my spleenful sons this trull deflower" (2.3.190–191); Aaron's two asides in 3.1 (ll.187–190 and 201–202); Lucius's "Now will I to the Goths and raise a power,/To be revenged on Rome and Saturnine" (3.1.298–299); Marcus's "O, heavens, can you hear a good man groan" speech (4.1.122–129); Young Lucius's asides in 4.2 (ll.6 and 8–9); Aaron's "Now to the Goths, as swift as swallow flies,/There to dispose this treasure in mine arms,/And secretly to greet the Empress' friends" (4.2.172–174); and Tamora's "Now will I to that old Andronicus,/And temper him with all the art I have,/To pluck proud Lucius from the warlike Goths" (4.4.107–109).

The most significant difference from the original play concerned the character of Young Lucius, who is a much more important figure in the adaptation; he is present throughout Act 1, and retrieves the murder weapon after the death of Mutius; it is his knife which Titus uses to kill the fly; he aids in the capture of Chiron and Demetrius; he is present throughout the final scene. Much as Julie Taymor would do in her 1999 filmic adaptation, Howell set Young Lucius as the centre of the production to prompt the question "What are we doing to the children?" At the end of the play, as Lucius delivers his final speech, the camera stays on Young Lucius rather than his father, who is in the far background and out of focus, as he stares in horror at the coffin of Aaron's child (which has been killed off-screen). Thus the production became "in part about a boy's reaction to murder and mutilation. We see him losing his innocence and being drawn into this adventure of revenge; yet, at the end we perceive that he retains the capacity for compassion and sympathy."

In 2001, the animated sitcom South Park based an episode on the play. In "Scott Tenorman Must Die", Eric Cartman is swindled by Scott Tenorman. Cartman tries various methods to get his money back, but Scott remains always one step ahead. He then decides to exact revenge on Scott. After numerous failed attempts, he hatches a plan which culminates in him having Scott's parents killed, the bodies of whom he then cooks in chili, which he feeds to Scott. He then gleefully reveals his deception as Scott finds his mother's finger in the chilli.

The Netflix TV series Unbreakable Kimmy Schmidt features a character originally named Ronald Wilkerson who changed his name to Titus Andromedon, possibly derived from this play.

=== Radio ===
The play has very rarely been staged for radio. In 1923, extracts were broadcast on BBC radio, performed by the Cardiff Station Repertory Company as the second episode of a series of programs showcasing Shakespeare's plays, entitled Shakespeare Night. In 1953, BBC Third Programme aired a 130-minute version of the play, adapted for radio by J. C. Trewin and starring Baliol Holloway as Titus, Sonia Dresdal as Tamora, George Hayes as Aaron and Janette Tregarthen as Lavinia. In 1973, BBC Radio 3 aired an adaptation directed by Martin Jenkins, starring Michael Aldridge as Titus, Barbara Jefford as Tamora, Julian Glover as Aaron and Frances Jeater as Lavinia. In 1986, Austrian radio channel Österreich 1 staged an adaptation by Kurt Klinger, starring Romuald Pekny as Titus, Marion Degler as Tamora, Wolfgang Böck as Aaron and Elisabeth Augustin as Lavinia.
