= Cahiers Élisabéthains =

- Discipline: English literary Renaissance
- Language: English
- Edited by: Florence March; Jean-Christophe Mayer; Peter J. Smith; Nathalie Vienne-Guerrin

Publication details
- History: 1972-present
- Publisher: Institut de Recherche sur la Renaissance, l'Âge Classique et les Lumières

Standard abbreviations
- ISO 4: Cah. Élisabéthains

Indexing
- ISSN: 0184-7678
- OCLC no.: 564402802

The Cahiers Élisabéthains (lit. 'Elizabethan notebooks') is a peer-reviewed academic journal established in 1972, which specializes in publishing research on the English literary Renaissance. The journal is published by the Institut de Recherche sur la Renaissance, l'Âge Classique et les Lumières (UMR 5186, a joint research unit of the French National Centre for Scientific Research and Paul Valéry University, Montpellier III). As of 2015, the editors-in-chief are Florence March, Jean-Christophe Mayer, Nathalie Vienne-Guerrin and Peter J. Smith.

In defining its mission, the journal notes that the term English Renaissance "is given its broadest connotation: subjects have ranged from Chaucer to Restoration drama and beyond. The literature and drama of the Elizabethan period is, however, the focal point of our interests." The journal also publishes articles on Performance in Context and a wide range of international play reviews, as well as book reviews. The journal is published three times a year (April, July, November).

The journal is a member of the Committee on Publication Ethics (COPE).
