= Shakespearean history =

Shakespeare's history plays

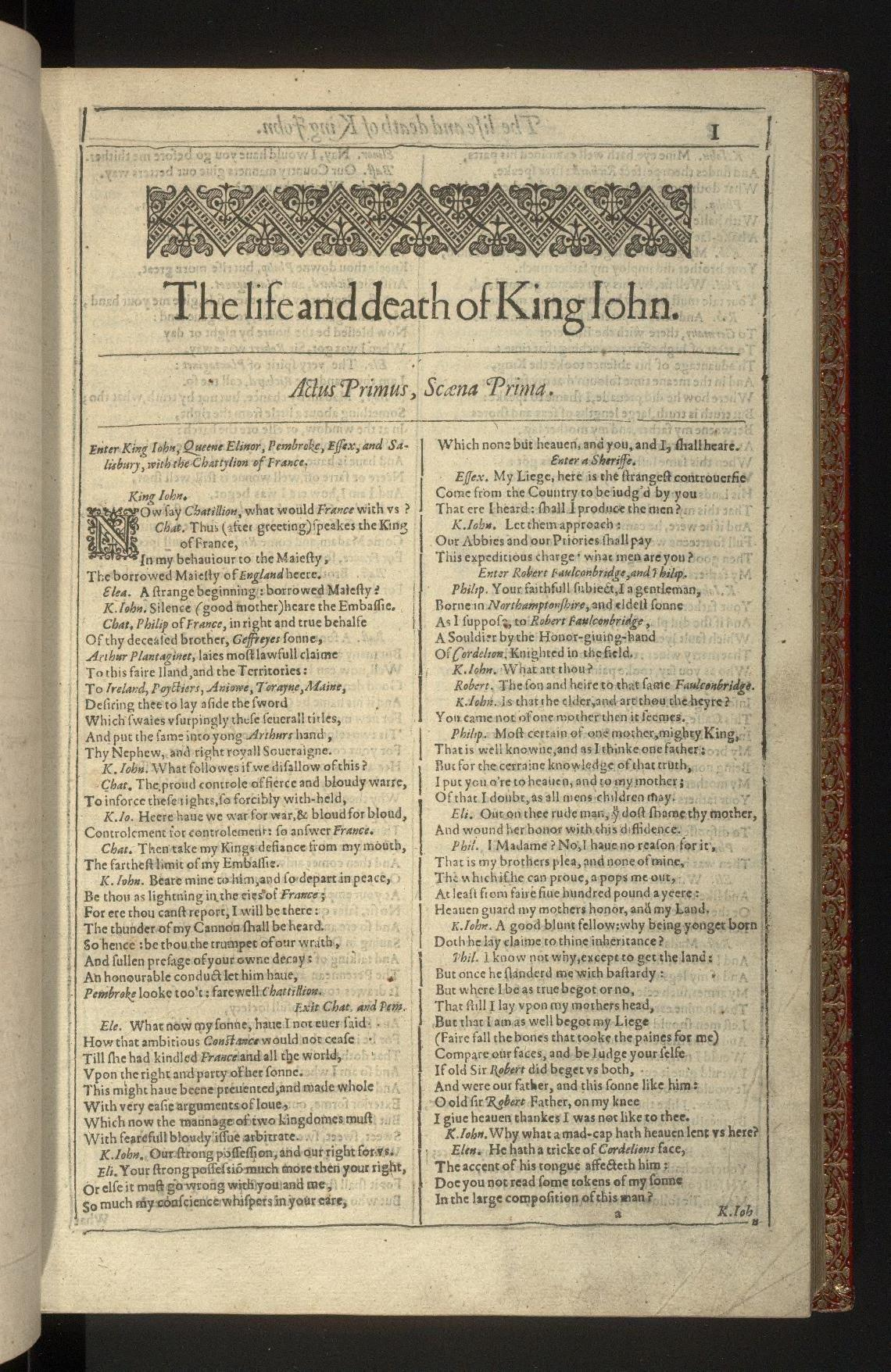
The First Folio (1623): The title page of the history play The Life and Death of King John.

In the First Folio (1623), the plays of William Shakespeare were in three categories: (i) comedies, (ii) histories, and (iii) tragedies. Alongside the history plays of his Renaissance playwright contemporaries, the histories of Shakespeare define the theatrical genre of history plays. The historical plays also are biographies of the English kings of the previous four centuries, and include the plays King John, Edward III, and Henry VIII, and a continual sequence of eight plays known as the Henriad, for the protagonist Prince Hal, the future King Henry V of England.

The chronology of Shakespeare's plays indicates that the first tetralogy was written in the early 1590s, and discusses the politics of the Wars of the Roses; the four plays are Henry VI, parts I, II, and III, and The Tragedy of Richard the Third. The second tetralogy was completed in 1599, and comprises the history plays Richard II, Henry IV, parts I and II, and Henry V.

Moreover, the First Folio includes the classifications of the late romances and of the problem plays that feature historical characters among the dramatis personæ; thus, in English literature, the term "Shakespearean history play" includes the Roman plays Julius Caesar, Antony and Cleopatra, and Coriolanus; and the tragedies King Lear and Macbeth.

== Historical sources ==
The book of British history, Holinshed's Chronicles of England, Scotlande, and Irelande (1577, 1587), by Raphael Holinshed, is the principal documentary source for the historical backgrounds and political drama in Shakespeare's English history plays and in the tragedies of Macbeth and of King Lear. The history source for the Roman history plays is the Thomas North English translation (1579) of Parallel Lives (Lives of the Noble Grecians and Romans Compared Together), by Plutarch.

== Politics in the English history plays ==
The playwright William Shakespeare lived during the régime of Queen Elizabeth I (r. 1558–1603), who was the last dynastic monarch of the House of Tudor (r. 1485–1603); thus, the history plays of Shakespeare can be considered political propaganda that warns against the wrack-and-ruin of civil war and celebrates the founders of the House of Tudor. In particular, The Tragedy of Richard the Third (1594) derogates the last man of the rival House of York, King Richard III (r. 1483–1485), as "that bottled spider, that foul bunchback'd toad", while praising Richard's successor, Henry VII (r. 1485–1509) as the better man to be King of England.

The playwright's political bias for the House of Tudor also is evident in The Famous History of the Life of King Henry the Eighth, which concludes in celebration of the birth of his daughter Elizabeth. Thematically important to Shakespeare's representation of societal decline in the Late Middle Ages (1300–1500) is the politicking that propels the action in Richard III, which indicates that the Medieval collapse originated from the opportunistic practises of Machiavellianism in all politics. By way of nostalgia for the less treacherous way of life of the Late Middle Ages, in the history plays, Shakespeare shows the evolution of politics and social class that armed the House of Tudor to claim and take the throne of England.

=== Family myths of right and law ===
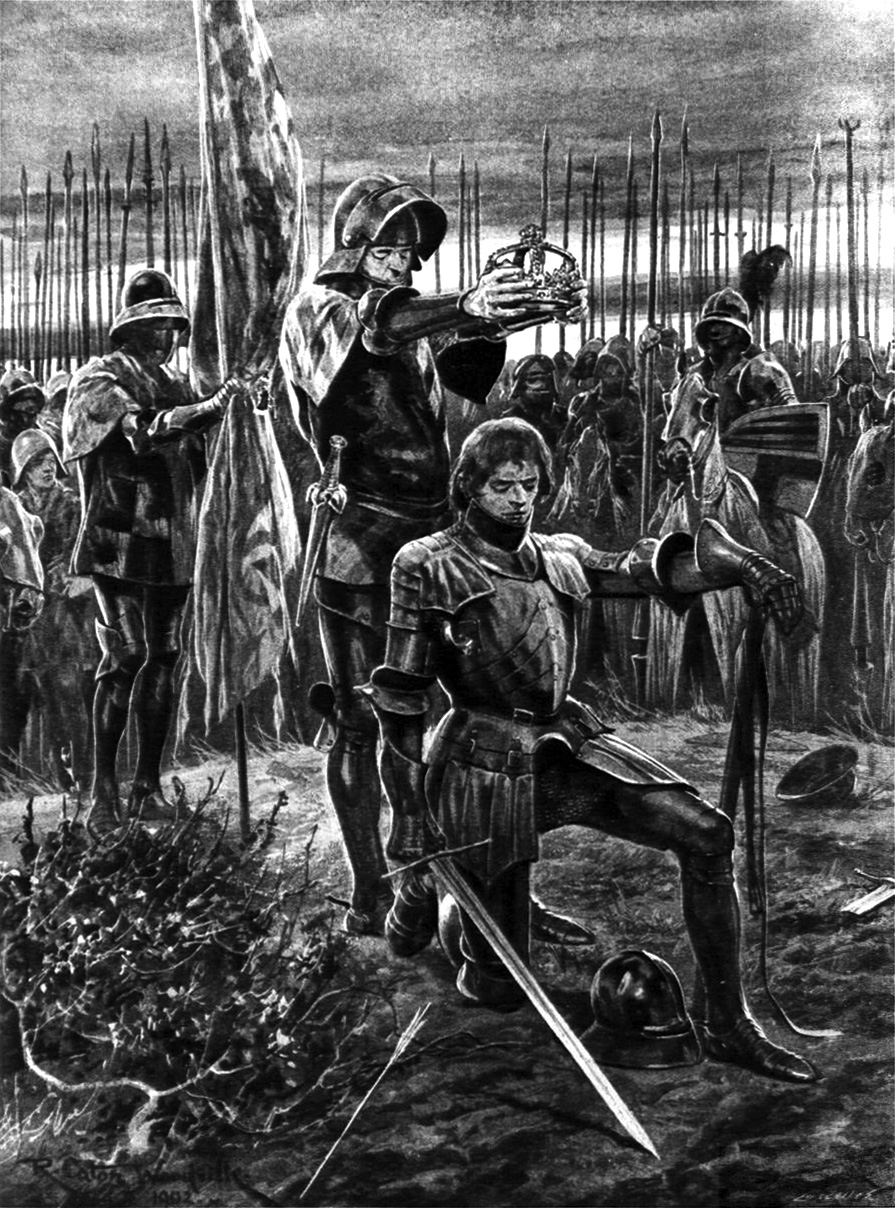
The Informal Coronation of Henry VII by Lord Stanley on the Battlefield of Bosworth, August 22, 1485 depicts a key historical event in the Tudor claim to the Throne of England. (Richard Caton Woodville Jr.)

To accurately portray the people and personages who were the House of Lancaster, the House of York, and the House of Tudor, Shakespeare used the family myths of right and law (bloodline and political legitimacy) reported in Holinshed's Chronicles. In dynastic claims to the Throne of England, the Lancaster Myth claimed that the deposition of Richard II and the reign of Henry IV were actions divinely sanctioned, and that the military victories and the geopolitical achievements of Henry V were divine favours. The York Myth claimed that Edward IV's deposition of Henry VI was the divine restoration of the usurped Throne of England to the rightful and lawful heirs of Richard II. Moreover, the claims of the Tudor Myth condemned the York brothers for murdering King Henry VI and Prince Edward; stressed divine sanction in the fall of the House of York and the consequent ascent of Henry Tudor—whose union of the houses of Lancaster and York was prophesied by Henry VI.

The family and political myths of the House of Tudor claim that Henry Tudor's praying before the start of the Battle of Bosworth Field (1485) indicated he was divinely favoured for martial victory, and that Henry's battlefield defeat of Richard III "was justified on the principles of contemporary political theory, for Henry was not merely rebelling against a tyrant, but putting down a tyrannous usurper, which The Mirror for Magistrates allowed".

In their histories of England, the chroniclers Polydore Vergil, Edward Hall, and Raphael Holinshed stressed the lessons learned from past divine interventions to British history. In Union of the Two Noble and Illustre Families of Lancastre and Yorke (1548), Edward Hall said that divine Providence had cursed England for the deposition and murder of Richard II, but then laid peace upon the realm in the person of Henry Tudor and his dynasty. Holinshed's judgement was that Richard, Duke of York, and his line were divinely punished for Richard violating his oath to allow the full reign of Henry VI. As political propagandists, the chroniclers incorporated elements of all three myths in their narrative histories' treatments of the period from Richard II to Henry VII. For Shakespeare's use of the three myths, see § Interpretations.

== History plays of William Shakespeare ==
=== English histories ===
As in the First Folio (1623), the plays about English history are listed by historical chronology, not by the chronologies of composition, publication, and performance.

- King John
- Edward III
- Richard II
- Henry IV, Part 1
- Henry IV, Part 2
- Henry V
- Henry VI, Part 1
- Henry VI, Part 2
- Henry VI, Part 3
- Richard III
- Henry VIII

=== Roman histories ===
As noted, the First Folio collects the tragedies thus:

- Coriolanus
- Julius Caesar
- Antony and Cleopatra

=== Other histories ===
As with the Roman history plays, the First Folio classifies the following plays as tragedies. Although thematically related by way of historical background, royal biography, and based upon the Holingshed and the Plutarch sources, these plays are not part of Shakespeare's English histories.

- King Lear
- Macbeth
- Hamlet
- Titus Andronicus; although set in Ancient Rome, the fictional tragedy of the Roman general Titus Andronicus is not a Roman history play.

== Interpretations ==
=== Tetralogies and the Henriad ===
In Divine Providence in the England of Shakespeare’s Histories (1970), the academic H. A. Kelly examines Shakespeare's political bias and analyses his historical assertions about the earthly influence of divine Providence in: (a) the contemporary historical chronicles, (b) the Tudor historians, and (c) the Elizabethan poets—notably the two tetralogies: (i) Henry VI to Richard III and (ii) Richard II to Henry V. As an historiographer and as a dramaturgist, Shakespeare displaced divine Providence from the historical sources and presented divine influence as the opinions of spokesmen-characters; thus Lancastrians speak the sentimental myth of the House Lancaster, Yorkists speak the sentimental myth of the House of York, while Henry Tudor personifies the sentimental myth of the House of Tudor. That literary recasting of divine dialogues to mortal men and women allows each play to create, develop, and establish a unique ethos and mythos from which spring the actions of protagonists and antagonists.

Whereas the chroniclers explained that historical events were influenced and decided by the divine justice of Providence, the playwright Shakespeare placed the earthly influence of Providence in the dramatic background. In defending his claim to the Throne of England, Richard, Duke of York, stressed the justification of providential justice to Parliament. To reject Richard's claim to the English throne, Shakespeare did not develop that theme in the scene at Parliament (3 Henry VI). In the first tetralogy, Henry VI does not perceive his troubles as divine retribution; in the second tetralogy, there is no thematic leitmotif of Providential punishment for Henry IV. The allusions to hereditary punishment by Providence are Richard II's prediction of a civil war at his abdication; Henry IV's fear of punishment through his wayward son; Henry V's fear of Providence punishing him for the sins of his father; and Clarence's fear of providential retribution against him through his children.

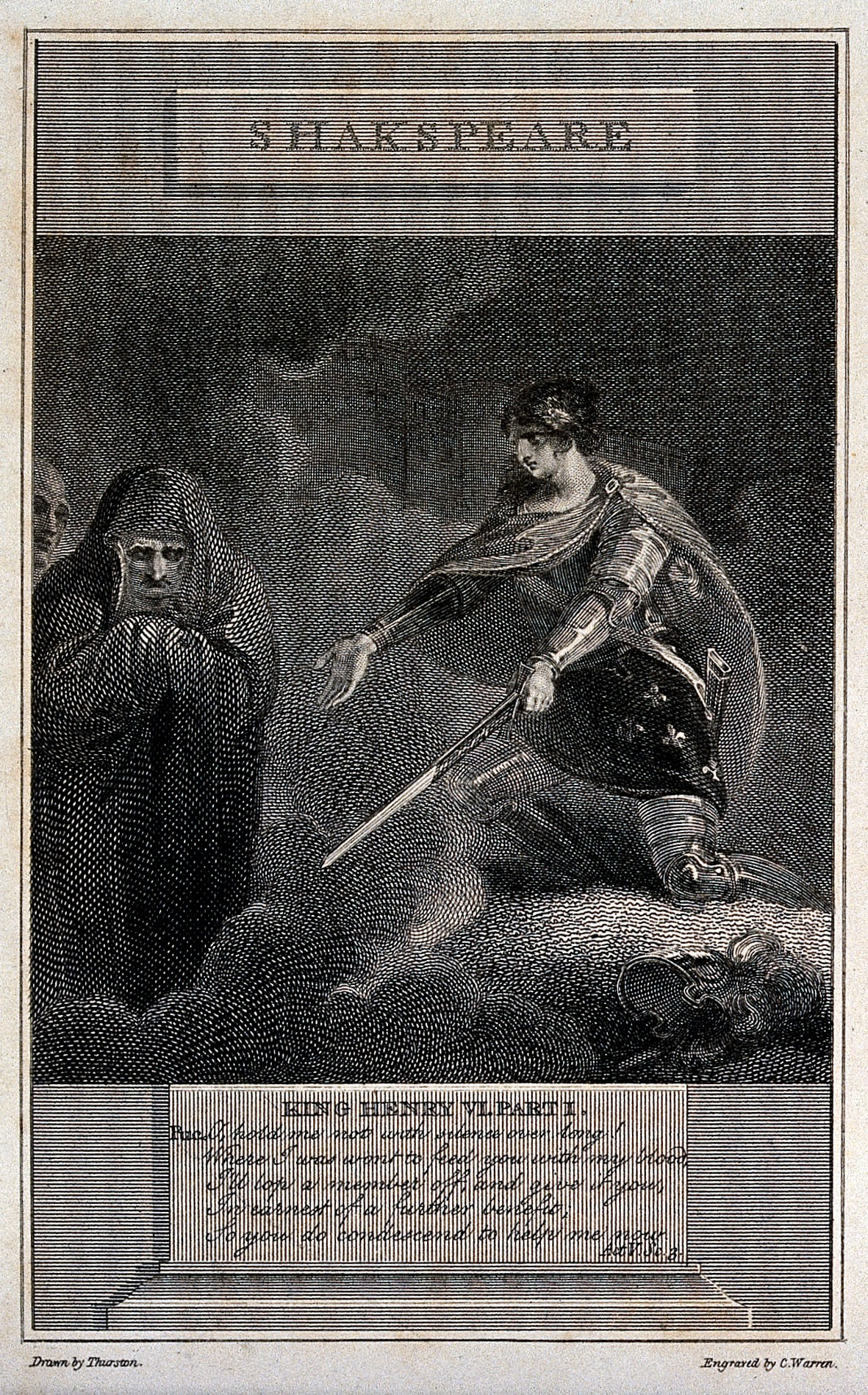
King Henry VI, Part I: Joan of Arc conjures demons for battle against the English invaders of France. (C. Warren, 1805)

Whereas the chroniclers of history explained that divine Providence was twice displeased—first, by the marriage between the English King Henry VI and the French duchess Margaret of Anjou, and second, because of Henry's broken vow to the Armagnac girl—the playwright Shakespeare has Duke Humphrey object to Margaret as queen consort because the marriage would lose England possession and control of the Duchy of Anjou and the territory of the Maine. Dismissing the chroniclers' historical opinions that Talbot's victories were divinely ordained, Shakespeare shows that the defeat and death of Talbot were consequences of dissention among the ranks of the English. Shakespeare further presents the outcomes of political and military events and of personal drama as the results of poetic justice, as established in Senecan dramaturgy; thus dreams, prophecies, and curses are of narrative importance in the early tetralogy, which shows poetic justice take effect — especially Henry VI's prophecy about the future Henry VII.

Accordingly, Shakespeare's moral characterisation and political bias, Kelly argues, change from play to play, "which indicates that he is not concerned with the absolute fixing of praise or blame", though he does achieve general consistency within each play:

Many of his changes in characterisation must be blamed upon the inconsistencies of the chroniclers before him. For this reason, the moral conflicts of each play must be taken in terms of that play, and not supplemented from the other plays.

Shakespeare meant each play primarily to be self-contained. Thus in Richard II the murder of Thomas of Woodstock, Duke of Gloucester, inaugurates the action — John of Gaunt places the guilt on Richard II — but Woodstock is forgotten in the later plays. Again, Henry IV, at the end of Richard II, speaks of a crusade as reparation for Richard's death: but in the next two plays he does not show remorse for his treatment of Richard. As for the Henry VI plays, the Yorkist view of history in 1 Henry VI differs from that in 2 Henry VI: in Part 1 the conspiracy of the Yorkist Richard Earl of Cambridge against Henry V is admitted; in Part 2 it is passed silently over. Henry VI's attitude to his own claim undergoes changes. Richard III does not refer to any events prior to Henry VI's reign.

Kelly finds evidence of Yorkist bias in the earlier tetralogy. 1 Henry VI has a Yorkist slant in the dying Mortimer's narration to Richard Plantagenet (later Duke of York). Henry VI is weak and vacillating and overburdened by piety; neither Yorkists nor Queen Margaret think him fit to be king. The Yorkist claim is put so clearly that Henry admits, aside, that his own is weak—Kelly notes that this is "the first time that such an admission is conjectured in the historical treatment of the period". Shakespeare is suggestively silent in Part 3 on the Yorkist Earl of Cambridge's treachery in Henry V's reign. Even loyal Exeter admits to Henry VI that Richard II could not have resigned the crown legitimately to anyone but the heir, Mortimer. Edward (later IV) tells his father York that his oath to Henry was invalid because Henry had no authority to act as magistrate.

As for Lancastrian bias, York is presented as unrighteous and hypocritical in 2 Henry VI, and while Part 2 ends with Yorkist victories and the capture of Henry, Henry still appears "the upholder of right in the play". In Richard III in the long exchange between Clarence and the assassins we learn that not only Clarence but also implicitly the murderers and Edward IV himself consider Henry VI to have been their lawful sovereign. The Duchess of York's lament that her family "make war upon themselves, brother to brother, blood to blood, self against self" derives from Vergil and Hall's judgment that the York brothers paid the penalty for murdering King Henry and Prince Edward. In the later tetralogy Shakespeare clearly inclines towards the Lancaster myth. He makes no mention of Edmund Mortimer, Richard's heir, in Richard II, an omission which strengthens the Lancastrian claim. The plan in Henry IV to divide the kingdom in three undermines Mortimer's credibility. The omission of Mortimer from Henry V was again quite deliberate: Shakespeare's Henry V has no doubt about his own claim. Rebellion is presented as unlawful and wasteful in the second tetralogy: as Blunt says to Hotspur, "out of limit and true rule / You stand against anointed majesty".

Shakespeare's retrospective verdict, however, on the reign of Henry VI, given in the epilogue to Henry V, is politically neutral: "so many had the managing" of the state that "they lost France and made his England bleed". In short, though Shakespeare "often accepts the moral portraitures of the chronicles which were originally produced by political bias, and has his characters commit or confess to crimes which their enemies falsely accused them of" (Richard III being perhaps a case in point), his distribution of the moral and spiritual judgements of the chronicles to various spokesmen creates, Kelly believes, a more impartial presentation of history.

=== Wider Shakespearean history ===
John F. Danby in Shakespeare’s Doctrine of Nature (1949) examines the response of Shakespeare's history plays (in the widest sense) to the vexed question: "When is it right to rebel?", and concludes that Shakespeare's thought ran through three stages: (1) In the Wars of the Roses plays, Henry VI to Richard III, Shakespeare shows a new thrustful godlessness attacking the pious medieval structure represented by Henry VI. He implies that rebellion against a legitimate and pious king is wrong, and that only a monster such as Richard of Gloucester would have attempted it. (2) In King John and the Richard II to Henry V cycle, Shakespeare comes to terms with the Machiavellianism of the times as he saw them under Elizabeth. In these plays he adopts the official Tudor ideology, by which rebellion, even against a wrongful usurper, is never justifiable. (3) From Julius Caesar onwards, Shakespeare justifies tyrannicide, but in order to do so moves away from English history to the camouflage of Roman, Danish, Scottish or Ancient British history.

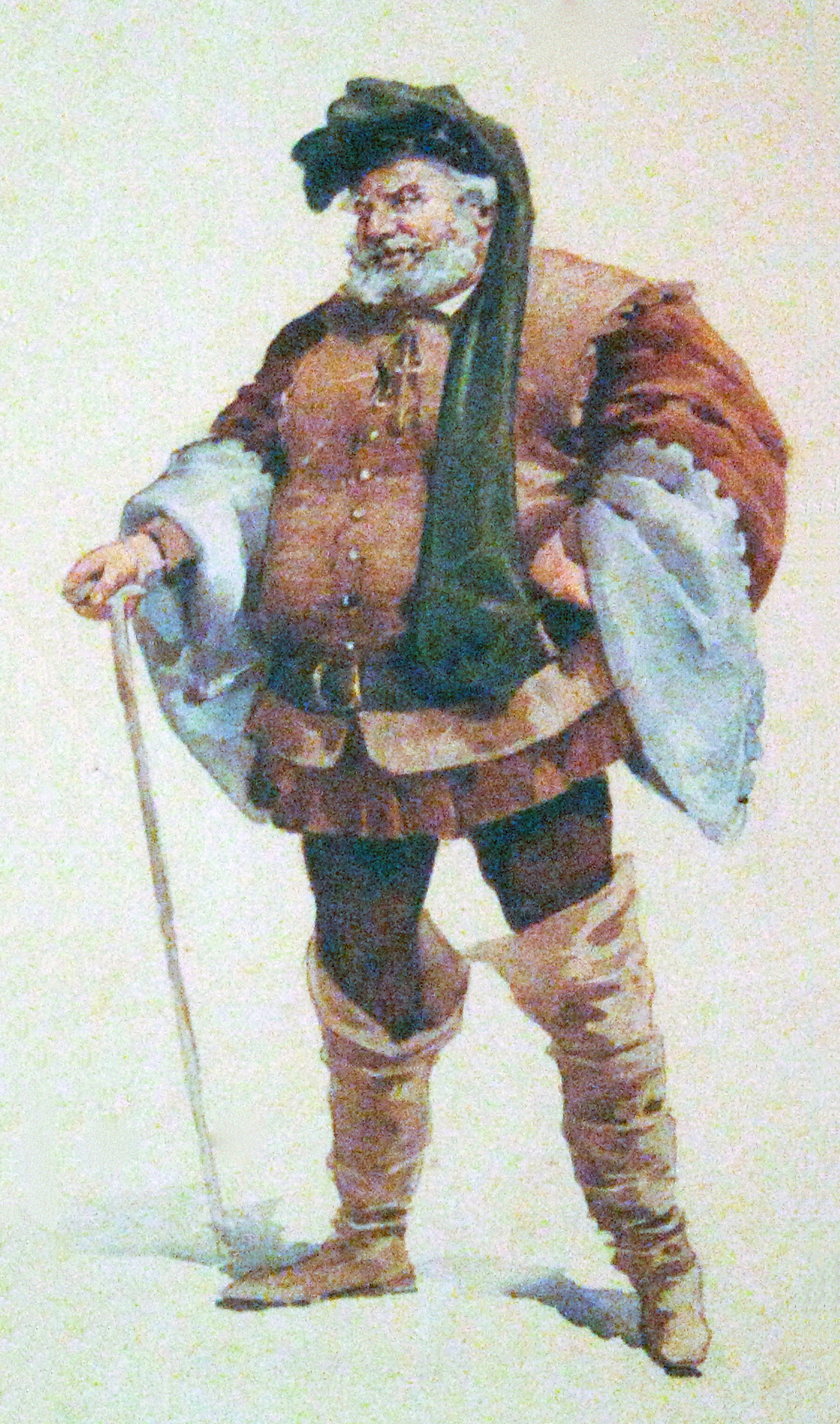
'Falstaff', (Adolfo Hohenstein)—according to Danby, "in every sense, the bigger man" than Hal

Danby argues that Shakespeare's study of the Machiavel is key to his study of history. His Richard III, Faulconbridge in King John, Hal and Falstaff are all Machiavels, characterised in varying degrees of frankness by the pursuit of "Commodity" (i.e. advantage, profit, expediency). Shakespeare at this point in his career pretends that the Hal-type Machiavellian prince is admirable and the society he represents historically inevitable. Hotspur and Hal are joint heirs, one medieval, the other modern, of a split Faulconbridge. Danby argues, however, that when Hal rejects Falstaff he is not reforming, as is the common view, but merely turning from one social level to another, from Appetite to Authority, both of which are equally part of the corrupt society of the time. Of the two, Danby argues, Falstaff is the preferable, being, in every sense, the bigger man. In Julius Caesar there is a similar conflict between rival Machiavels: the noble Brutus is a dupe of his Machiavellian associates, while Antony's victorious "order", like Hal's, is a negative thing. In Hamlet king-killing becomes a matter of private rather than public morality—the individual's struggles with his own conscience and fallibility take centre stage. Hamlet, like Edgar in King Lear later, has to become a "machiavel of goodness". In Macbeth the interest is again public, but the public evil flows from Macbeth's primary rebellion against his own nature. "The root of the machiavelism lies in a wrong choice. Macbeth is clearly aware of the great frame of Nature he is violating."

King Lear, in Danby's view, is Shakespeare's finest historical allegory. The older medieval society, with its doting king, falls into error, and is threatened by the new Machiavellianism; it is regenerated and saved by a vision of a new order, embodied in the king's rejected daughter. By the time he reaches Edmund, Shakespeare no longer pretends that the Hal-type Machiavellian prince is admirable; and in Lear he condemns the society which is thought to be historically inevitable. Against this he holds up the ideal of a transcendent community and reminds the audience of the "true needs" of a humanity to which the operations of a Commodity-driven society perpetually do violence. This "new" thing that Shakespeare discovers is embodied in Cordelia. The play thus offers an alternative to the feudal–Machiavellian polarity, an alternative foreshadowed in France's speech (I.1.245–256), in Lear and Gloucester's prayers (III.4. 28–36; IV.1.61–66), and in the figure of Cordelia. Cordelia, in the allegorical scheme, is threefold: a person, an ethical principle (love), and a community. Until that decent society is achieved, we are meant to take as role-model Edgar, the Machiavel of patience, of courage and of "ripeness". After King Lear Shakespeare's view seems to be that private goodness can be permanent only in a decent society.

== Shakespeare and the chronicle play genre ==
=== Dates and themes ===
Chronicle plays—history-plays based on the chronicles of Polydore Vergil, Edward Hall, Raphael Holinshed and others—enjoyed great popularity from the late 1580s to c. 1606. By the early 1590s they were more numerous and more popular than plays of any other kind. John Bale's morality play Kynge Johan [:King John], c. 1547, is sometimes considered a forerunner of the genre. King John was of interest to 16th century audiences because he had opposed the Pope; two further plays were written about him in the late 16th century, one of them Shakespeare's Life and Death of King John. Patriotic feeling at the time of the Spanish Armada contributed to the appeal of chronicle plays on the Hundred Years' War, notably Shakespeare's Henry VI trilogy, while unease over the succession at the close of Elizabeth I's reign made plays based on earlier dynastic struggles from the reign of Richard II to the Wars of the Roses topical. Plays about the deposing and killing of kings, or about civil dissension, met with much interest in the 1590s, while plays dramatising supposedly factual episodes from the past, advertised as "true history" (though the dramatist might know otherwise), drew larger audiences than plays with imagined plots.

The chronicle play, however, always came under close scrutiny by the Elizabethan and Jacobean authorities. Playwrights were banned from touching "matters of divinity or state", a ban that remained in force throughout the period, the Master of Revels acting as licenser. The deposition scene in Richard II (IV.i.154–318), for example, almost certainly part of the play as it was originally written, was omitted from the early quartos (1597, 1598, 1608) and presumably performances, on grounds of prudence, and not fully reinstated till the First Folio. The chronicle play, as a result, tended ultimately to endorse the principles of 'Degree', order, and legitimate royal prerogative, and so was valued by the authorities for its didactic effect. Some have suggested that history plays were quietly subsidised by the state, for propaganda purposes. The annual grant of a thousand pounds by the Queen to the Earl of Oxford from 1586 was, it has been argued, "meant to assist him as theatrical entrepreneur for the Court, in such a way that it would not become known that the Queen was offering substantial backing to the acting companies". Oxford was to support plays "which would educate the English people ... in their country's history, in appreciation of its greatness, and of their own stake in its welfare". Whether coincidence or not, a spate of history plays followed the authorization of the annuity. B. M. Ward pointed out (1928) that the elaborated, unhistorical and flattering role assigned to an earlier Earl of Oxford, the 11th, in The Famous Victories of Henry V (c. 1587), was designed as an oblique compliment to a contemporary financial backer of chronicle plays. By contrast, a less heroic ancestor of Oxford's, Robert de Vere, the 9th earl, who deserted at the Battle of Radcot Bridge, is left out of Thomas of Woodstock, which deals with the first part of Richard II's reign, though he was one of the king's early circle of favourites and a contemporary of Robert Tresilian, the play's villain.

=== Development ===
The early chronicle plays such as The Famous Victories of Henry the Fifth were, like the chronicles themselves, loosely structured, haphazard, episodic; battles and pageantry, spirits, dreams and curses, added to their appeal. The scholar H. B. Charlton gave some idea of their shortcomings when he spoke of "the wooden patriotism of The Famous Victories, the crude and vulgar Life and Death of Jack Straw, the flatness of The Troublesome Reign of King John, and the clumsy and libellous Edward I ". Under the influence of Marlowe's Tamburlaine, however, c. 1587, with its lofty poetry and its focus on a single unifying figure, of Shakespeare's Contention plays, c. 1589–90, and of the machiavels of revenge tragedy, chronicle-plays rapidly became more sophisticated in characterisation, structure, and style. Marlowe himself turned to English history as a result of the success of Shakespeare's Contention. In Edward II, c. 1591, he moved from the rhetoric and spectacle of Tamburlaine to "the interplay of human character", showing how chronicle material could be compressed and rearranged, and bare hints turned to dramatic effect.

"There was by that time" [the 1590s] "a national historical drama, embodying the profoundest sentiments by which the English people were collectively inspired—pride in a great past, exultation in a great present, confidence in a great future. Such a drama could develop only when certain conditions had been fulfilled—when the people, nationalized, homogeneous, feeling and acting pretty much as one, had become capable of taking a deep and active interest in its own past; when it had become awakened to a sense of its own greatness; when there had come into being a dramatic form by which historical material could be presented in such a way as to reveal those aspects of which the public felt most deeply the inspiration... This homogeneity did not arise out of identity of economic conditions, of political belief, or of religious creed, but was the product of the common participation, individually and various as it might be, in those large and generous emotions. These, for a brief glorious moment, were shared by Catholic and Puritan, courtier and citizen, master and man. And so we can speak of a national unanimity of thought and action, and of a national historical drama."
― W. D. Briggs, Marlowe's 'Edward II' (1914)

Shakespeare then took the genre further, bringing deeper insights to bear on the nature of politics, kingship, war and society. He also brought noble poetry to the genre and a deep knowledge of human character. In particular, he took a greater interest than Marlowe in women in history, and portrayed them with more subtlety. In interpreting events in terms of character, more than in terms of Providence or Fortune, or of mechanical social forces, Shakespeare could be said to have had a "philosophy of history". With his genius for comedy he worked up in a comic vein chronicle material such as Cade's revolt and the youth of Prince Hal; with his genius for invention, he largely created vital figures like Fauconbridge (if The Troublesome Reign was his) and Falstaff. His chronicle plays, taken together in historical order, have been described as constituting a "great national epic". Argument for possible Shakespearean authorship or part-authorship of Edward III and Thomas of Woodstock has in recent years sometimes led to the inclusion of these plays in the Shakespeare cycle.

Uncertainty about composition-dates and authorship of the early chronicle plays makes it difficult to attribute influence or give credit for initiating the genre. Some critics believe that Shakespeare has a fair claim to have been the innovator. In 1944 E. M. W. Tillyard argued that The Famous Victories of Henry the Fifth, c. 1586–87, could have been a work of Shakespeare's apprenticeship, a claim developed by Seymour Pitcher in 1961. Pitcher argued that annotations to a copy Edward Hall's Union of the Two Noble and Illustre Families of Lancastre and Yorke that was discovered in 1940 (the volume is now in the British Library) were probably written by Shakespeare and that these are very close to passages in the play. Again, W. J. Courthope (1905), E. B. Everitt (1965) and Eric Sams (1995) argued that The Troublesome Reign of King John, c. 1588–89, was Shakespeare's early version of the play later rewritten as The Life and Death of King John (the Second Quarto, 1611, had attributed The Troublesome Reign to "W.Sh."). Sams called The Troublesome Reign "the first modern history play". Everitt and Sams also believed that two early chronicle plays based on Holinshed and dramatising 11th century English history, Edmund Ironside, or War Hath Made All Friends, written c. 1588–89, and its lost sequel Hardicanute, performed in the 1590s, were by Shakespeare. A rival claimant to be the first English chronicle play is The True Tragedie of Richard the Third, of unknown authorship from the same period. In practice, however, playwrights were both 'influencers' and influenced: Shakespeare's two Contention plays (1589–90), influenced by Marlowe's Tamburlaine (1587), in turn influenced Marlowe's Edward II, which itself influenced Shakespeare's Richard II.

Of later chronicle plays, T. S. Eliot considered John Ford's Chronicle History of Perkin Warbeck "unquestionably [his] highest achievement" and "one of the very best historical plays outside of the works of Shakespeare in the whole of Elizabethan and Jacobean drama." Chronicle plays based on the history of other countries were also written during this period, among them Marlowe's The Massacre at Paris, George Chapman's Charles, Duke of Biron, John Webster's lost Guise, and Shakespeare's Macbeth. In some of the chronicle-based plays, as the various contemporary title-pages show, the genres of 'chronicle history' and 'tragedy' overlap.

=== Decline ===
Several causes led to the decline of the chronicle play in the early 17th century: a degree of satiety (many more chronicle plays were produced than the surviving ones listed below); a growing awareness of the unreliability of the genre as history; the vogue for 'Italianate' subject-matter (Italian, Spanish or French plots); the vogue for satirical drama of contemporary life ('city comedy'); the movement among leading dramatists, including Shakespeare, away from populism and towards more sophisticated court-centred tastes; the decline in national homogeneity with the coming of the Stuarts, and in the 'national spirit', that ended in civil war and the closing of the theatres (1642). Some of these factors are touched on by Ford in his Prologue to Perkin Warbeck (c. 1630), a defence of the chronicle play.

Table A: English chronicle plays, by reign dramatized
Reign	Play	Playwright(s)	Date(s)
Edmund Ironside	Edmund Ironside, or War Hath Made All Friends	Shakespeare (?)	written c. 1588–89 (?)
...
John	Kynge Johan	John Bale	written 1540s (?)
	The Troublesome Raigne of John, King of England	George Peele (?) / Shakespeare (?)	written c. 1588; published 1591
	The Life and Death of King John	Shakespeare	written c. 1595; published 1623
Henry III	—	—	—
Edward I	The Famous Chronicle of King Edward the First	George Peele	written 1590–91; published 1593
Edward II	The Troublesome Reign and Lamentable Death of Edward the Second, King of England	Christopher Marlowe	written c. 1591–92; published 1594
Edward III	The Raigne of King Edward the Third	Shakespeare (?)	written c. 1589, revised c. 1593–94; published 1596
Richard II	The Life and Death of Iack Straw, a Notable Rebell in England	George Peele (?)	published 1593
	Thomas of Woodstock; or King Richard the Second, Part One	Samuel Rowley (?) / Shakespeare (?)	written c. 1590
	The Tragedie of King Richard the Second / The Life and Death of King Richard the Second	Shakespeare	written c. 1595; published 1597, later enlarged
Henry IV	The Historie of Henrie the Fourth / The First Part of Henry the Fourth	Shakespeare	written c. 1597; published 1599
	The Second Part of Henrie the Fourth	Shakespeare	written c. 1598; published 1600
Henry V	The Famous Victories of Henry the Fifth	Samuel Rowley (?) / Shakespeare (?)	written c. 1586; published 1598
	The Cronicle History of Henry the Fift (Quarto)	Shakespeare	written 1590s; published 1600
	The Life of King Henry the Fift (Folio)	Shakespeare	written 1599, published 1623
	The True and Honourable Historie of the Life of Sir John Oldcastle	Anthony Munday, Michael Drayton, Richard Hathwaye and Robert Wilson	published 1600
Henry VI	The First Part of Henry the Sixt	Shakespeare	written c. 1590–91; published 1623
	The First Part of the Contention Betwixt the Two Famous Houses of Yorke and Lancaster (Quarto)	Shakespeare	written c. 1589–90 published 1594
	The Second Part of Henry the Sixt (Folio)	Shakespeare	published 1623
Henry VI and Edward IV	The True Tragedie of Richard Duke of Yorke, and the Death of Good King Henrie the Sixt (Quarto)	Shakespeare	written c. 1589–90; published 1595
	The Third Part of Henry the Sixt (Folio)	Shakespeare	published 1623
Edward IV	The First and Second Partes of King Edward the Fourth, containing His Mery Pastime with the Tanner of Tamworth, as Also His Loue to Faire Mistrisse Shoar	Thomas Heywood	published 1599
Edward IV, Edward V, Richard III	The True Tragedie of Richard the Third	Thomas Lodge (?) / George Peele (?) / Thomas Kyd (?) / Shakespeare (?)	written c. 1585 or 1587–88 (?) or c. 1589–90; published 1594
	The Tragedy of King Richard the Third	Shakespeare	written c. 1591–93; published 1597
Henry VII	The Chronicle History of Perkin Warbeck	John Ford	written c. 1630; published 1634
Henry VIII	All is True or The Famous History of the Life of King Henry the Eight	Shakespeare and (?) John Fletcher	written c. 1613; published 1623
	Sir Thomas More	Anthony Munday, Henry Chettle, Thomas Heywood, Thomas Dekker, Shakespeare	written 1590s
	The True Chronicle Historie of the Life and Death of Thomas Lord Cromwell	Wentworth Smith (?)	published 1613
	When You See Me You Know Me; or The Famous Chronicle Historie of King Henrie the Eight, with the Birth and Virtuous Life of Edward Prince of Wales	Samuel Rowley	published 1605
Edward VI			
Mary I	Sir Thomas Wyatt	Thomas Dekker and John Webster	written c. 1607
Mary I, Elizabeth I	If You Know Not Me, You Know No Bodie, or The Troubles of Queene Elizabeth	Thomas Heywood	published 1605
Elizabeth I	The Second Part of If You Know Not Me, You Know No Bodie, or The Troubles of Queene Elizabeth	Thomas Heywood	published 1606

Table B: English chronicle plays in conjectural composition-order
Play	Playwright(s)	Date(s)
The Famous Victories of Henry the Fifth	Samuel Rowley (?) / Shakespeare (?)	written c. 1586; published 1598
The True Tragedie of Richard the Third	Thomas Lodge (?) / George Peele (?) / Thomas Kyd (?) / Shakespeare (?)	written c. 1586 to c. 1590; published 1594
The Troublesome Raigne of John, King of England	George Peele (?) / Shakespeare (?)	written c. 1588; published 1591
Edmund Ironside, or War Hath Made All Friends	Shakespeare (?)	written c. 1588–89
The Raigne of King Edward the Third	Shakespeare (?)	written c. 1589, revised c. 1593–94; published 1596
The First Part of the Contention Betwixt the Two Famous Houses of Yorke and Lancaster (Quarto)	Shakespeare	written c. 1589–90 published 1594
The True Tragedie of Richard Duke of Yorke, and the Death of Good King Henrie the Sixt (Quarto)	Shakespeare	written c. 1589–90; published 1595
The Second Part of Henry the Sixt (Folio)	Shakespeare	published 1623
The Third Part of Henry the Sixt (Folio)	Shakespeare	published 1623
Thomas of Woodstock; or King Richard the Second, Part One	Samuel Rowley (?) / Shakespeare (?)	written c. 1590
The Famous Chronicle of King Edward the First	George Peele	written 1590–91; published 1593
The Life and Death of Iack Straw, a Notable Rebell in England	George Peele (?)	published 1593
The Troublesome Reign and Lamentable Death of Edward the Second, King of England	Christopher Marlowe	written c. 1591–92; published 1594
The First Part of Henry the Sixt	Shakespeare	written c. 1591; published 1623
The Cronicle History of Henry the Fift (Quarto)	Shakespeare	written 1590s; published 1600
The Tragedy of King Richard the Third	Shakespeare	written c. 1591–93; published 1597
The Life and Death of King John	Shakespeare	written c. 1595; published 1623
The Tragedie of King Richard the Second / The Life and Death of King Richard the Second	Shakespeare	written c. 1595; published 1597, later enlarged
Sir Thomas More	Anthony Munday, Henry Chettle, Thomas Heywood, Thomas Dekker, Shakespeare	written 1590s
The Historie of Henrie the Fourth / The First Part of Henry the Fourth	Shakespeare	written c. 1597; published 1599
The Second Part of Henrie the Fourth	Shakespeare	written c. 1598; published 1600
The Life of King Henry the Fift (Folio)	Shakespeare	written 1599, published 1623
The First and Second Partes of King Edward the Fourth, containing His Mery Pastime with the Tanner of Tamworth, as Also His Loue to Faire Mistrisse Shoar	Thomas Heywood	published 1599
The True and Honourable Historie of the Life of Sir John Oldcastle	Anthony Munday, Michael Drayton, Richard Hathwaye and Robert Wilson	published 1600
When You See Me You Know Me; or The Famous Chronicle Historie of King Henrie the Eight, with the Birth and Virtuous Life of Edward Prince of Wales	Samuel Rowley	published 1605
If You Know Not Me, You Know No Bodie, or The Troubles of Queene Elizabeth	Thomas Heywood	published 1605
The Second Part of If You Know Not Me, You Know No Bodie, or The Troubles of Queene Elizabeth	Thomas Heywood	published 1606
Sir Thomas Wyatt	Thomas Dekker and John Webster	written c. 1607
All is True or The Famous History of the Life of King Henry the Eight	Shakespeare and (?) John Fletcher	written c. 1613; published 1623
The True Chronicle Historie of the Life and Death of Thomas Lord Cromwell	Wentworth Smith (?)	published 1613
The Chronicle History of Perkin Warbeck	John Ford	written c. 1630; published 1634

The above tables include both the Quarto and the Folio versions of Henry V and Henry VI Parts 2 and 3, because the Quartos may preserve early versions of these three plays (as opposed to 'corrupted' texts). They exclude chronicle-type plays now lost, like Hardicanute, the probable sequel to Edmund Ironside, and plays based on legend, such as the anonymous True Chronicle History of King Leir and his three daughters, c. 1587, and Anthony Munday's two plays on Robin Hood, The Downfall of Robert Earl of Huntington and The Death of Robert Earl of Huntington.

== Shakespeare and Roman history play genre ==
Late 16th and early 17th century 'Roman history' plays—English plays based on episodes in Virgil, Livy, Tacitus, Sallust, and Plutarch—were, to varying degrees, successful on stage from the late 1580s to the 1630s. Their appeal lay partly in their exotic spectacle, partly in their unfamiliar plots, partly in the way they could explore topical themes safely detached from an English context. In Appius and Virginia (c. 1626), for example, John Webster added a non-historical episode (the only one in the play) about the starvation of Roman troops in the field by the neglect of the home authorities, to express his rage at the abandonment and death by starvation of the English army in the Low Countries in 1624–25. Dangerous themes such as rebellion and tyrannicide, ancient freedoms versus authoritarian rule, civic duty versus private ambition, could be treated more safely through Roman history, as Shakespeare treated them in Julius Caesar. Character and moral values (especially 'Roman values') could be explored outside an inhibiting Christian framework.

Shakespeare's Julius Caesar and his pseudo-historical Titus Andronicus were among the more successful and influential of Roman history plays. Among the less successful was Jonson's Sejanus His Fall, the 1604 performance of which at the Globe was "hissed off the stage". Jonson, misunderstanding the genre, had "confined himself to the dramatization of recorded fact, and refused to introduce anything for which he did not have historical warrant", thus failing to construct a satisfactory plot. According to Park Honan, Shakespeare's own later Roman work, Antony and Cleopatra and Coriolanus, carefully avoided "Sejanus's clotted style, lack of irony, and grinding moral emphasis".

Table A: Roman history plays, in historical order of events
Period	Play	Playwright(s)	Date(s)
Rome's origins	The Tragedie of Dido, Queene of Carthage	Marlowe and Nashe	written c. 1587–88, revised 1591–92 (?)
	The Rape of Lucrece, a true Roman Tragedy	Thomas Heywood	acted 1638
5th century BC	The Tragedie of Coriolanus	Shakespeare	written c. 1608–09, published 1623
450 BC, Decemvirate of Appius Claudius Crassus	Appius and Virginia	John Webster (and [?] Thomas Heywood)	written c. 1626
63–62 BC, Consulship of Cicero	Catiline His Conspiracy	Ben Jonson	acted and published 1611
48–47 BC	Caesar and Pompey	George Chapman	written c. 1612–13, published 1631
48–42 BC	The Tragedie of Caesar and Pompey. Or, Caesar's Revenge	anon. (Trinity College, Oxford origin [?])	written c. 1594, published 1606
	Pompey the Great, his Fair Cornelia	Thomas Kyd's trans. of Cornélie (1574) by Robert Garnier	translated c. 1593
	The Tragedie of Julius Caesar	Sir William Alexander	published 1604
44 BC	The Tragedie of Julius Caesar	Shakespeare	written c. 1599, performed 1599, published 1623
41–30 BC, Second Triumvirate	The Tragedie of Anthonie, and Cleopatra	Shakespeare	written c. 1606–07; published 1623
30 AD, reign of Tiberius	Sejanus His Fall. A Tragedie	Ben Jonson	written c. 1603, revised c. 1604, published 1605
90–96 AD, reign of Domitian	The Roman Actor. A tragedie	Philip Massinger	written c. 1626, published 1629

Table B: Roman history plays in conjectural composition-order
Play	Playwright(s)	Date(s)
The Tragedie of Dido, Queene of Carthage	Marlowe and Nashe	written c. 1587–88, revised 1591–92
Pompey the Great, his Fair Cornelia	Thomas Kyd's trans. of Cornélie (1574) by Robert Garnier	translated c. 1593
The Tragedie of Caesar and Pompey. Or, Caesar's Revenge	anon. (Trinity College, Oxford origin [?])	written c. 1594, published 1606
The Tragedie of Julius Caesar	Shakespeare	written c. 1599, performed 1599, published 1623
Sejanus His Fall. A Tragedie	Ben Jonson	written c. 1603, revised c. 1604, published 1605
The Tragedie of Julius Caesar	Sir William Alexander	published 1604
The Tragedie of Anthonie, and Cleopatra	Shakespeare	written c. 1606–07; published 1623
The Tragedie of Coriolanus	Shakespeare	written c. 1608–09, published 1623
Catiline His Conspiracy	Ben Jonson	acted and published 1611
Caesar and Pompey	George Chapman	written c. 1612–13, published 1631
Appius and Virginia	John Webster (and [?] Thomas Heywood)	written c. 1626
The Roman Actor. A tragedie	Philip Massinger	written c. 1626, published 1629
The Rape of Lucrece, A True Roman tragedy	Thomas Heywood	acted 1638

- The above tables exclude Shakespeare's Titus Andronicus (composed c. 1589, revised c. 1593), which is not closely based on Roman history or legend but which, it has been suggested, may have been written in reply to Marlowe's Dido, Queene of Carthage, Marlowe's play presenting an idealised picture of Rome's origins, Shakespeare's "a terrible picture of Rome's end, collapsing into moral anarchy".

== Wars of the Roses cycle on stage and in film ==
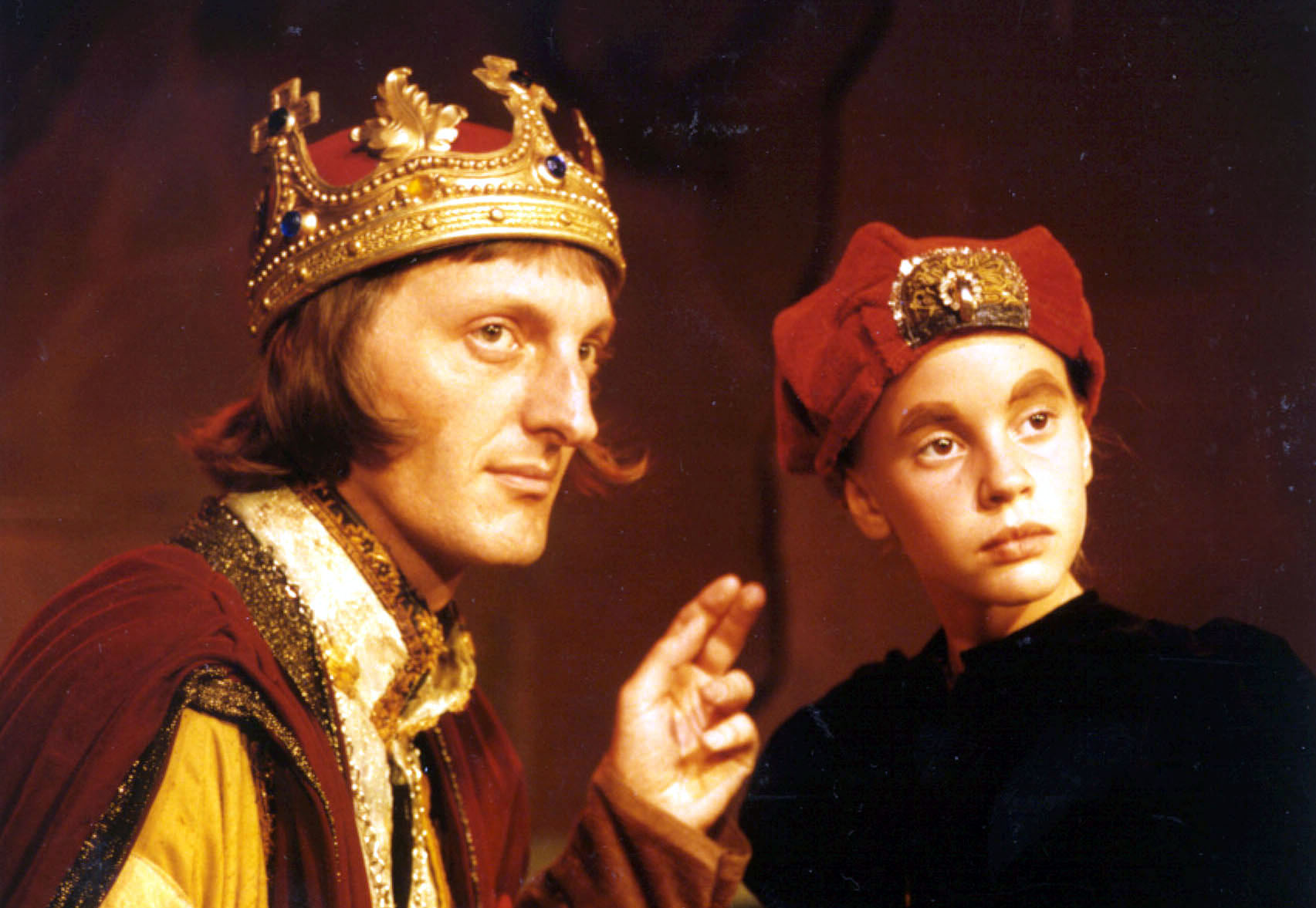
Henry VI (Jeffrey T. Heyer) and a young Richmond (Ashley Rose Miller) in the West Coast premiere of The Plantagenets: The Rise of Edward IV, staged by Pacific Repertory Theatre in 1993.

"The Wars of the Roses" is a phrase used to describe the civil wars in England between the Lancastrian and Yorkist dynasties. Some of the events of these wars were dramatised by Shakespeare in the history plays Richard II, Henry IV, Part 1, Henry IV, Part 2, Henry V, Henry VI, Part 1, Henry VI, Part 2, Henry VI, Part 3, and Richard III. In the twentieth and twenty-first centuries there have been numerous stage performances, including:

1. The first tetralogy (Henry VI parts 1 to 3 and Richard III) as a cycle;
2. The second tetralogy (Richard II, Henry IV parts 1 and 2 and Henry V) as a cycle (which has also been referred to as the Henriad); and
3. The entire eight plays in historical order (the second tetralogy followed by the first tetralogy) as a cycle. Where this full cycle is performed, as by the Royal Shakespeare Company in 1964, the name The Wars of the Roses has often been used for the cycle as a whole.
4. A conflation of the eight plays by Tom Wright and Benedict Andrews, under the title The War of the Roses, was performed by the Sydney Theatre Company in 2009.

The tetralogies have been filmed for television five times, twice as the entire cycle:

1. for the 1960 UK serial An Age of Kings directed by Michael Hayes. Featuring David William as Richard II, Tom Fleming as Henry IV, Robert Hardy as Henry V, Terry Scully as Henry VI, Paul Daneman as Richard III, Julian Glover as Edward IV, Mary Morris as Queen Margaret, Judi Dench as Princess Catherine, Eileen Atkins as Joan la Pucelle, Frank Pettingell as Falstaff, William Squire as The Chorus and Justice Shallow, and, Sean Connery as Hotspur.
2. for the 1965 UK serial The Wars of the Roses, based on the RSC's 1964 staging of the Second Tetralogy, which condensed the Henry VI plays into two plays called Henry VI and Edward IV. adapted by John Barton and Peter Hall; and directed by Hall. Featuring Ian Holm as Richard III, David Warner as Henry VI, Peggy Ashcroft as Margaret, Donald Sinden as York, Roy Dotrice as Edward and Jack Cade, Janet Suzman as Joan and Lady Anne and William Squire as Buckingham and Suffolk.
3. Second Tetralogy filmed for the BBC Television Shakespeare in 1978/1979 directed by David Giles. Richard II was filmed as a stand-alone piece for the first season of the series, with the Henry IV plays and Henry V filmed as a trilogy for the second season. Featuring Derek Jacobi as Richard II, John Gielgud as John of Gaunt, Jon Finch as Henry IV, Anthony Quayle as Falstaff, David Gwillim as Henry V, Tim Pigott-Smith as Hotspur, Charles Gray as York, Wendy Hiller as the Duchess of Gloucester, Brenda Bruce as Mistress Quickly, and Michele Dotrice as Lady Percy.
4. First Tetralogy filmed for the BBC Television Shakespeare in 1981 directed by Jane Howell, although the episodes didn't air until 1983. In the First Tetralogy, the plays are performed as if by a repertory theater company, with the same actors appearing in different parts in each play. Featuring Ron Cook as Richard III, Peter Benson as Henry VI, Brenda Blethyn as Joan, Bernard Hill as York, Julia Foster as Margaret, Brian Protheroe as Edward, Paul Jesson as Clarence, Mark Wing-Davey as Warwick, Frank Middlemass as Cardinal Beaufort, Trevor Peacock as Talbot and Jack Cade, Paul Chapman as Suffolk and Rivers, David Burke as Gloucester and Zoe Wanamaker as Lady Anne.
5. for a straight-to-video filming, directly from the stage, of the English Shakespeare Company's 1987 production of "The Wars of the Roses" directed by Michael Bogdanov and Michael Pennington. Featuring Pennington as Richard II, Henry V, Buckingham, Jack Cade and Suffolk, Andrew Jarvis as Richard III, Hotspur and the Dauphin, Barry Stanton as Falstaff, The Duke of York and the Chorus in Henry V, Michael Cronin as Henry IV and the Earl of Warwick, Paul Brennan as Henry VI and Pistol, and June Watson as Queen Margaret and Mistress Quickly. The three Henry VI plays are condensed into two plays, bearing the subtitles Henry VI: House of Lancaster and Henry VI: House of York.
6. Second Tetralogy filmed as The Hollow Crown for BBC2 in 2012 directed by Rupert Goold (Richard II), Richard Eyre (Henry IV, Parts 1 & 2) and Thea Sharrock (Henry V). Featuring Ben Whishaw as Richard II, Patrick Stewart as John of Gaunt, Rory Kinnear as Henry Bolingbroke (in Richard II) and Jeremy Irons as Henry IV, Tom Hiddleston as Henry V, Simon Russell Beale as Falstaff, Joe Armstrong as Hotspur, and Julie Walters as Mistress Quickly. The first tetralogy was later adapted in 2016.

Many of the plays have also been filmed stand-alone, outside of the cycle at large. Famous examples include Henry V (1944), directed by and starring Laurence Olivier, and Henry V (1989), directed by and starring Kenneth Branagh; Richard III (1955), directed by and starring Olivier, and Richard III (1995), directed by Richard Loncraine and starring Ian McKellen; and Chimes at Midnight (1965) (also known as Falstaff), directed by and starring Orson Welles, combining Henry IV, Part I and Part II, with some scenes from Henry V.
