= If You Know Not Me, You Know Nobody =

Two-part play by Thomas Heywood

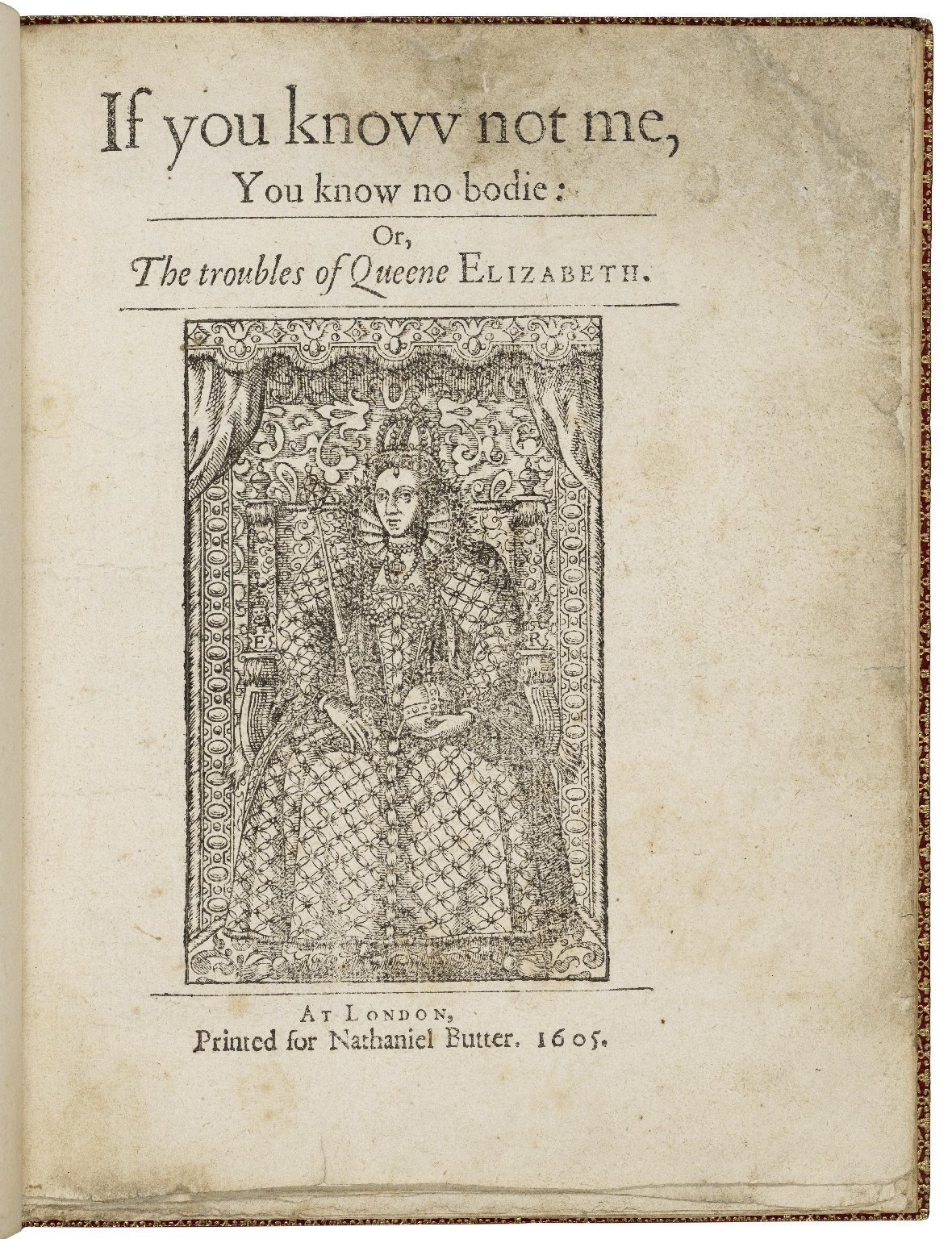
Title page of Part One of If you Know Not Me, You Know No Bodie; Or, The troubles of Queene Elizabeth, printed for Nathaniel Butter, London, 1605

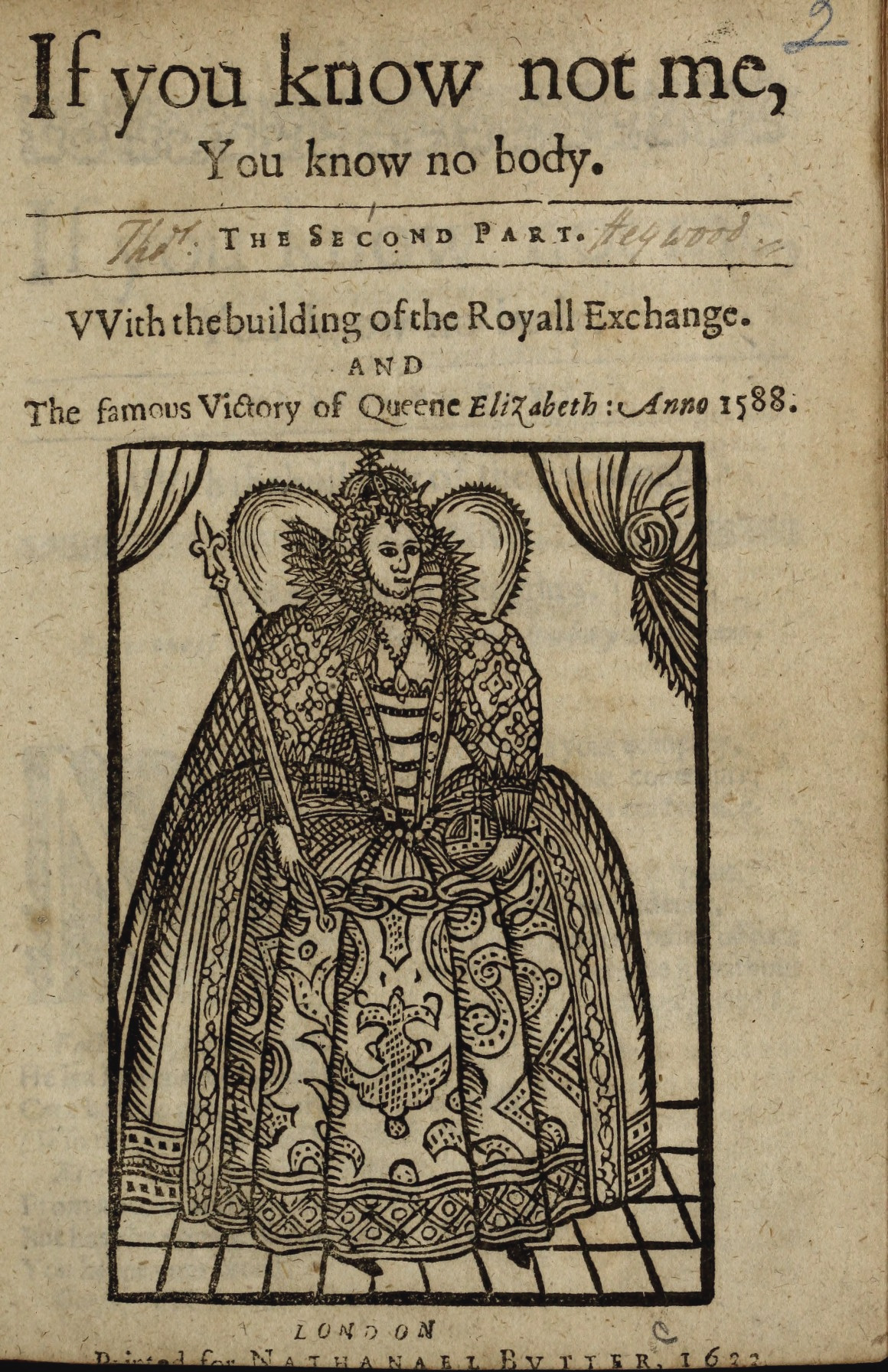
Title page of Part Two of If You Know Not Me, You Know No Body, printed for Nathaniel Butter, London, 1633

If You Know Not Me, You Know Nobody; or The Troubles of Queen Elizabeth is a two-part play by Thomas Heywood, depicting the life and reign of Elizabeth I of England, written very soon after the latter's death. The title deliberately echoes that of Samuel Rowley's 1605 play When You See Me You Know Me.

Part 1 is a chronicle history of the main events in the reign of Mary I, ending with the accession of Elizabeth. It was entered into the Stationers' Register on 5 July 1605, and published in quarto soon after by the bookseller Nathaniel Butter. The play was popular, and subsequent quartos were issued in 1606, 1608, 1610, 1613, 1623, 1632, and 1639. The play was most likely written for and performed by Queen Anne's Men, and remained in their repertory many years.

The full title of Part 2 was entered into the Stationers' Register on 14 September 1605 and was first printed in quarto in 1606, again by Nathaniel Butter. Subsequent quartos appeared in 1609 and 1633, plus an undated edition that is thought to have been issued in 1623. The 1633 quarto features an alternative text of Act V.

Part 2 devotes its first three acts to the building of the Royal Exchange by Thomas Gresham and revolves around the character of Hobson, a haberdasher who desperately tries to curb his apprentices' reckless behaviour. He blames them for leaving his shop and going to taverns while he is away. Thomas Gresham decides to bind John Gresham, his nephew, as an apprentice to Hobson but this new apprentice reveals to be a prodigal who is only interested in taverns and disreputable wenches. John Gresham flees to France with 100 pounds he stole from his uncle, and proceeds to play tricks on his new master, sending him match instead of establishing a mercantile network in France. Hobson chases him there in his night gown and slippers and finds him in the house of a French courtesan. John tricks Hobson into believing that the courtesan is really a reputable business-woman, and then threatens to tattle on Hobson to his wife when the courtesan's identity is revealed. Hobson agrees not to punish John, but insists on bringing the troublesome factor back to England with him, thereby preventing any further tricks.

During a pageant in honour of Queen Elizabeth, Hobson boldly introduces himself to the Queen and is sincerely surprised she does not remember him, hence the title of the play: "If you know not me, you know nobody". In fact Hobson has been gulled by a cony-catcher into believing the Queen asked him to give her some money, which he graciously provided. The Queen promises him he will be paid back.

At this particular moment in the play, the action shifts from city comedy to history as the plot abruptly switches to the life of Queen Elizabeth. She escapes Doctor William Parry's assassination plot and faces the Spanish Armada's attempted invasion of England with other characters of political importance (notably Sir Francis Drake). Drake's victory rounds off the play.

== Chronological compression ==
The Exchange was founded in 1565, and granted the name "Royal" in 1571; the Parry plot took place in 1584–85, and the Armada was repulsed in 1588. In the play, all these events follow quickly on one another, and the news of the battle of Alcazar (1578) is received before the Exchange becomes Royal.
