= History (theatrical genre) =

Theatrical genre

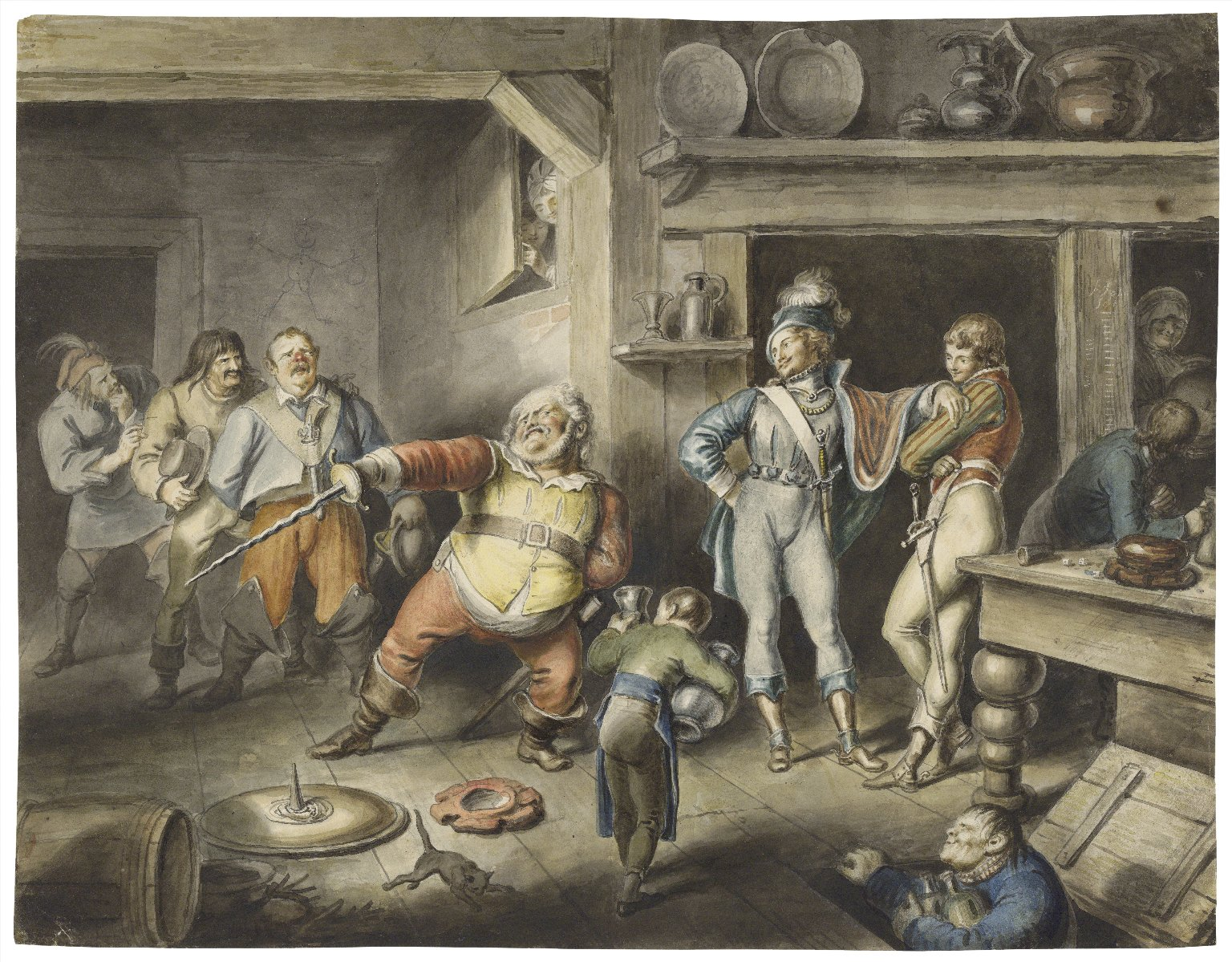
A scene from Shakespeare's Henry IV, Part 1, Act II, Scene 4. Falstaff offers a false account of a skirmish between himself and eleven assailants.

History is one of the three main genres in Western theatre alongside tragedy and comedy, although it originated, in its modern form, thousands of years later than the other primary genres. For this reason, it is often treated as a subset of tragedy. A play in this genre is known as a history play and is based on a historical narrative, often set in the medieval or early modern past. History emerged as a distinct genre from tragedy in Renaissance England. The best known examples of the genre are the history plays written by William Shakespeare, whose plays still serve to define the genre. History plays also appear elsewhere in Western literature, such as Thomas Heywood's Edward IV, Schiller's Mary Stuart or the Dutch national poet Joost van den Vondel's play Gijsbrecht van Aemstel.

== Precursors ==
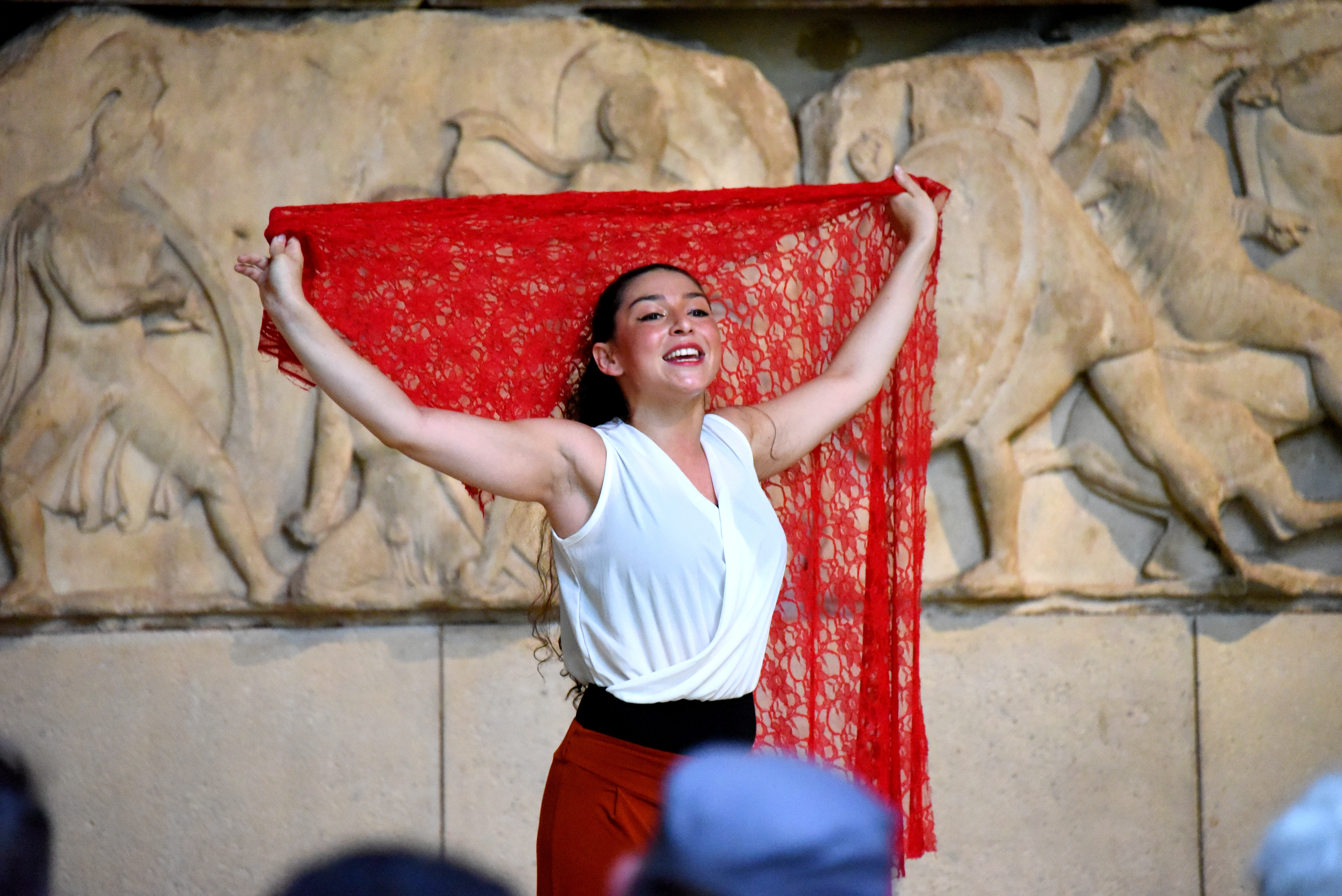
Room 17, the Nereid Monument at the British Museum, London. An actress performs a play in front of the monument.

Plays with some connection to historic narratives date to the beginnings of Athenian theatre. For one, although many early Greek plays covered subjects that modern audiences consider myth (rather than history), the Greeks did not make such a distinction, incorporating their stories of their gods into the same overarching narrative that included stories of their kings. Furthermore, the earliest surviving work of theatre, The Persians records an event that was entirely historical, even under the modern understanding of history. A key difference between The Persians and a history play in the modern sense is the incorporation of supernatural elements into the narrative of the Salamis. Additionally, it primarily dramatizes the Persian reaction to the battle, information that would have been at best a secondary concern for the Greek historian. Thus, although it concerns a verifiable historic event, it differs substantially from the modern genre of "history plays" in that it doesn't conform to the modern understanding of history (by presenting unverifiable supernatural elements as fact) and in that its goals didn't entirely parallel those of ancient Greek historians.

A significant development in the evolution of the history play occurred during the Middle Ages with the rise of mystery plays. Theatre in the Middle Ages arose from traditions surrounding the mass, a ritual that, due to the orthodox theological position that the eucharistic sacrifice reenacts (and even recreates) the sacrifice on the cross, has profound similarities to theatre (and to the types of rituals that gave rise to theatre in ancient Athens). While the regular Sunday liturgy was like theatre, the traditions that evolved around the Easter service were theatre. Specifically the "Quem quaeritis?", explicitly involved the portrayal of characters by the priest and the acolyte.

With this as a starting point, medieval theatre makers began crafting other plays detailing the religious narratives of Christianity. Plays about saints, especially local saints, were particularly popular in England. These plays conformed to the goals of contemporary historians, often closely paralleling "Lives of the Saints" books. They are generally not included in the modern understanding of history plays, however, because they differ significantly from the modern understanding of history by unquestioningly including supernatural phenomena as key elements. The final step in the origin of the modern history play, therefore, would require, as a prerequisit, the evolution of the modern understanding of history.

== Early modern origins ==
The history play first took its modern form in Tudor England. Literary scholar Irving Ribner, in his influential study of the genre, connects the emergence of the history play with "a new birth of historical writing in England" during the sixteenth century, which included new books of English history written by Polydore Vergil (1534), Edward Hall (1543), and Raphael Holinshed (1577), among others. While this trend of increasing historical literature has its roots in late Medieval England, it reached a new level of intensity after the ascension of Henry VII with the perceived need to show the justification of the Tudors' position in the monarchy. The motivations of renaissance playwrights generally coincided with those of renaissance historians, so, although England produced many historical works during the Middle Ages, these works were almost completely ignored in favor of more recent historical narratives. In a more recent scholarly work, Ralph Hertel links the performative nature of the history play with a growing sense of English national identity under the early Tudors. "Englishness," in his words, is “considered as something brought forth by the spectators who participate in the theatre event by becoming eye witnesess of sorts of the events staged and who engage in the Englishness displayed theatrically."

Early examples of Tudor history plays include John Skelton's Magnyfycence (1519). In this work, characters are named in the traditional fashion of a medieval morality play, with the lead named "Magnificance" and primary adversaries bearing names such as "Folly". Through the plot line and the characters' relationships with each other, however, Skelton assures that his contemporaries in the audience will easily recognize the identities of Henry VII in the title character and Cardinal Thomas Wolsey in Folly. John Bale's Kynge Johan, written 1538, takes another significant step toward the emergence of the secular history play by specifically naming the historic figures associated with his allegorically named characters.

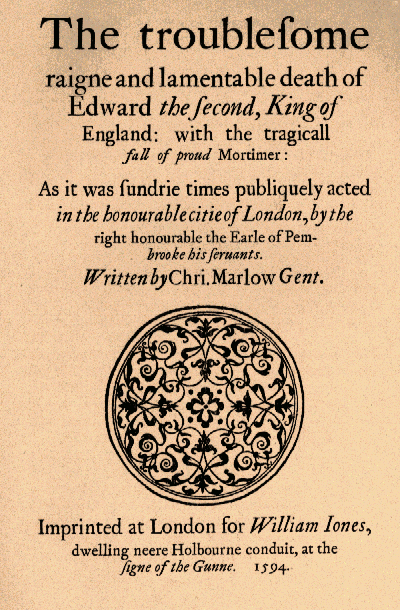
Title page of the earliest published text of Edward II (1594)

Later in the century, Christoper Marlowe's Edward II (1592) was profoundly influential in the development of the history play. While earlier English history plays tried to incorporate as much information as possible from their sources, Marlowe focused on the events that would contribute to his play from a storytelling perspective. In doing so, he not only provided the link between history and tragedy which would be elemental to later English Renaissance history plays but also set a new standard for effective use of the history play as propaganda.

Although the history play evolved in England in a time when theatre in general was often viewed with suspicion, it was held up, even among theatre's critics, as an example of what could be valuable in the art form. A significant factor in the favorable treatment that history plays received was the social function that commentators of the time believed that plays of this genre provided. For Thomas Nash and Thomas Heywood, for example, the English history play immortalized English heroes of the past and created a sense of national pride in audiences. Generally speaking, history plays sought to accomplish the goals of historians using the dramatic medium. In the case of playwrights in Renaissance England, this often amounted to historical propaganda in theatrical form.

In assessing the past hundred years of literary scholarship on this English history play, Brian Walsh writes that "the center of gravity for work on the history play has remained the political arena. With few exceptions, scholars have tended to focus on the genre‘s topical relevance for Elizabethan and Jacobean questions of national identity, kingly authority, and the interpellation of subjects. The focus has yielded a number of persuasive links between theatrical representation, the domestic and international expansion of state power, and the very day-to-day operation of Elizabeth’s and James’s governments."

In addition to those written by Shakespeare, other early modern history plays include John Ford's Perkin Warbeck, and the anonymous plays Edward III, Thomas of Woodstock, and Sir Thomas More.

== Shakespeare ==
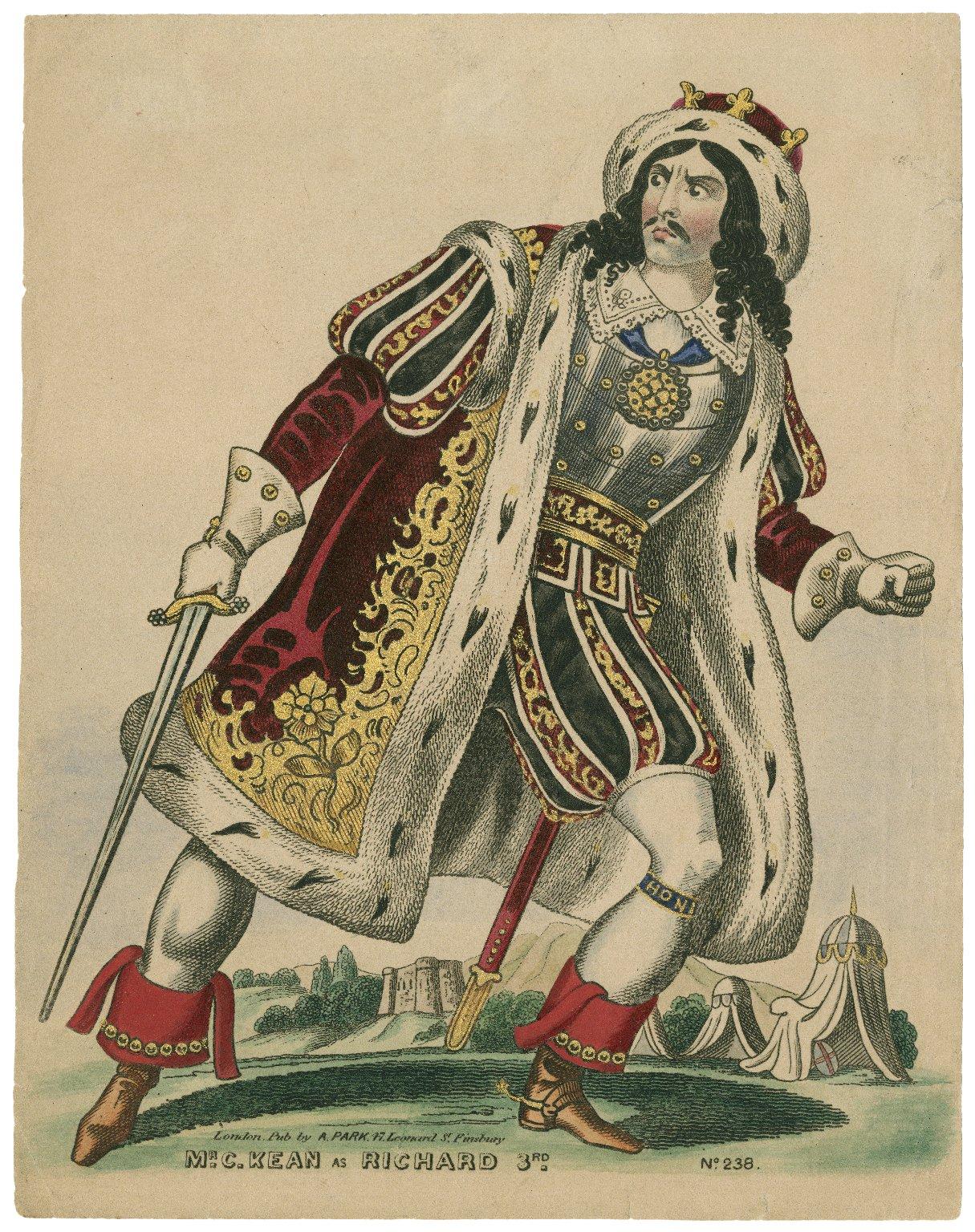
Charles Kean as Richard III

In the First Folio, the plays of William Shakespeare were grouped into three categories: comedies, histories, and tragedies. The histories—along with those of contemporary Renaissance playwrights—help define the genre of history plays. Shakespeare's histories might be more accurately called the "English history plays." These plays dramatize historical events from English history as early as the reign of King John and as late as Henry VIII. In addition to these two, Shakespeare wrote eight plays covering the continuous period of history between the reigns of Richard II and Richard III. The so-called first tetralogy, apparently written in the early 1590s, deals with the later part of the struggle and includes Henry VI, parts one, two & three and Richard III. The second tetralogy, finished in 1599 and including Richard II, Henry IV, Part 1, Henry IV, Part 2 and Henry V, is frequently called the Henriad after its protagonist Prince Hal, the future Henry V.

Shakespeare himself alludes to the recognition of history as an established theatrical genre in Hamlet when Polonius announces the arrival of "the best actors in the world, either for tragedy, comedy, history...". Several of Shakespeare's other plays listed as tragedies in the First Folio, however, could be classified as history plays according to a broader, more generalized definition. Plays such as Julius Caesar and Antony and Cleopatra depict historical events from classical antiquity, for example, while King Lear and Cymbeline dramatize the history of ancient Britain and Macbeth depicts the historical events not of medieval England but rather of medieval Scotland.

A consistent theme in historical drama of both Shakespeare and his English contemporaries revolves around questions of who had legitimate claim to participate in the affairs of the state. Shakespeare's history plays are considered the defining works of the genre. Later playwrights of history plays would either follow his stylistic model or at least have an acute awareness of their stylistic differences with Shakespearean histories.

== Restoration and eighteenth century ==
Following the Restoration, the English History as a genre lost much of the momentum that they had gained during the Tudor and Stuart eras. Even the most esteemed genre of English Renaissance theatre, tragedy (to which the history genre had been closely tied from the beginning), had fallen out of style in favor of tragicomedy and comedy. Nevertheless, English playwrights produced numerous plays depicting historical events outside of England including William Davenant's The Siege of Rhodes, John Dryden's The Indian Queen and The Indian Emperor, Elkanah Settle's The Empress of Morocco.

Productions of history plays often had an intentionally revivalist character. For example, adaptations of Shakespeare's plays, including his histories, were extremely popular.

In the eighteenth century, Joseph Addison's neo-classical Cato, a Tragedy could be classified as a history play according to the same broad, generalized definition that would apply to Shakespeare's Julius Caesar.

== In contemporary theatre ==
Popular recently authored history plays include James Goldman's The Lion in Winter. Criticized as ahistorical, it tests the boundaries of the genre, while also poking fun at its conventions. Although, in many respects it has more in common with absurdist comic domestic drama, it retains an essentially historic core. George Bernard Shaw's Saint Joan has received widespread praise, and has even been compared favorably to Shakespeare's histories. The temporal boundary of history plays is tested in Stuff Happens by David Hare, which chronicles the events leading up to the Iraq War with only two years separating the author from his subject. The play focuses heavily on the use of exact quotes, with all public speeches given by the main characters being taken word for word from actual quotes.

== See also ==
- Historical drama
