= Sir Thomas Wyatt (play) =

1607 history play by John Webster and Thomas Dekker

Sir Thomas Wyatt is a history play published in 1607 and written in collaboration by John Webster and Thomas Dekker. It was probably first performed in 1602.

== Plot ==
The play opens with the death of King Edward VI. Under the will of King Henry VIII, his daughter Mary was due to succeed, but, under an Act of Parliament later in the reign of Edward VI, Lady Jane Grey was entitled to take the throne. Her father-in-law, John Dudley, 1st Duke of Northumberland, proclaims Jane Grey Queen and forces her to accept, though she is reluctant. Thomas Wyatt the Younger goes to Mary, who rejoices at the death of her half-brother Edward VI, and encourages her to move fast to assert her claim. Support for Jane Grey vanishes away and the Duke of Northumberland is arrested and charged with treason. Jane Grey and her husband Guildford Dudley are also arrested.

Mary, now acknowledged Queen, accepts a marriage proposal from the future Philip II of Spain. Wyatt protests vehemently and leaves the court to mount a rebellion based in Kent. When London does not let his forces in, they scatter, leaving Wyatt to be captured.

In the last part of the play, Jane Grey, Guildford Dudley and Thomas Wyatt are executed.

== Characteristics of the play ==
The play consists of a series of short episodes with relatively little emphasis on detailed characterisation. It is not divided into Acts or Scenes. The style is plain, with little use of metaphor. Much of the play is in blank verse.

Jane Grey and her husband are presented as a loving couple caught up in the machinations of others. Despite the title of the play, Jane Grey's role is as central as that of Sir Thomas Wyatt. Wyatt himself is shown as someone loyal to the wishes of Henry VIII and opposed to foreign influence in English affairs. Stephen Gardiner, Bishop of Winchester, makes several appearances and is portrayed as a harsh supporter of Mary who is uncompromising in his treatment of those who oppose her or her policies.

In the second half of the play there is some anti-Spanish sentiment, reflecting the state of hostility between England and Spain when the play was written and in the preceding decades.

As in many plays of the period, there are passages featuring a clown. These give comic relief, but contribute little to the main plot.

== Sources ==
The play may have drawn heavily on a previous play called Lady Jane, thought to have been written by Henry Chettle, Thomas Heywood and Wentworth Smith. This earlier work has not survived.

== Publishing history ==
The play was first published in 1607, and there is a copy of this edition in the British Library. It was not published again until its inclusion in an 1830 edition of the works of John Webster which was put together by Alexander Dyce. Most recently, it can be found in Delphi Complete Works of John Webster, an eBook issued by Delphi Classics in 2015, which reproduces the Dyce introduction and text.
