= The Life and Death of Jack Straw =

16th-century play

The Life and Death of Jack Straw is a late 16th-century play, possibly written by playwright George Peele.

The play tells the story of Jack Straw, a rebel leader in the Peasants' Revolt of 1381. The play was possibly written by George Peele and probably originally designed for production in one of London's guild pageants. The play portrays Jack Straw as a tragic figure, being led into wrongful rebellion by the priest John Ball, drawing clear allegorical links between the instability of late-Elizabethan England and the politics of the 14th century. It is one of the earliest political plays of its type in England.

The play was initially printed in 1593 by John Danter for William Barley, and the rights were subsequently transferred to Thomas Pavier, who printed a new edition in 1604. There is no record of performance from the early modern period contained in either edition.

Performances in the modern era are rare. The only recorded performance was mounted by Bad Quarto Productions in November 2016 in New York City. A full cast audio adaptation was produced in 2019 by Beyond Shakespeare, with a stage revival planned for 2020, but, like most of 2020, then postponed. Recent authorship studies hint at Samuel Rowley and William Shakespeare whose reference texts have the lowest delta values, i.e. they show the smallest stylistic difference from The Life and Death of Jack Straw.

== Bibliography ==
- Ilsemann, Hartmut, "Jack Straw", Shakespeare Statistics.
- The Life and Death of Iacke Straw, A notable Rebell in England Who was kild in Smithfield by the Lord Maior of London, London, 1593.
- The Life and death of Iacke Straw, A notable Rebell in England Who was killed in Smithfield by the Lord Mayor of London, London, 1604. Facsimile of 1593/1604 version at Google Books
- "The Life and Death of Jack Straw", Beyond Shakespeare, 9 December 2019.
- Miller, Howard (7 November 2016), "The Life and Death of Jack Straw", Talkin' Broadway.
- Ribner, Irving (2005), The English History Play in the Age of Shakespeare, Abingdon, UK: Routledge, ISBN 9780415353144.
