= The Famous Victories of Henry V =

Anonymous 1580s English play

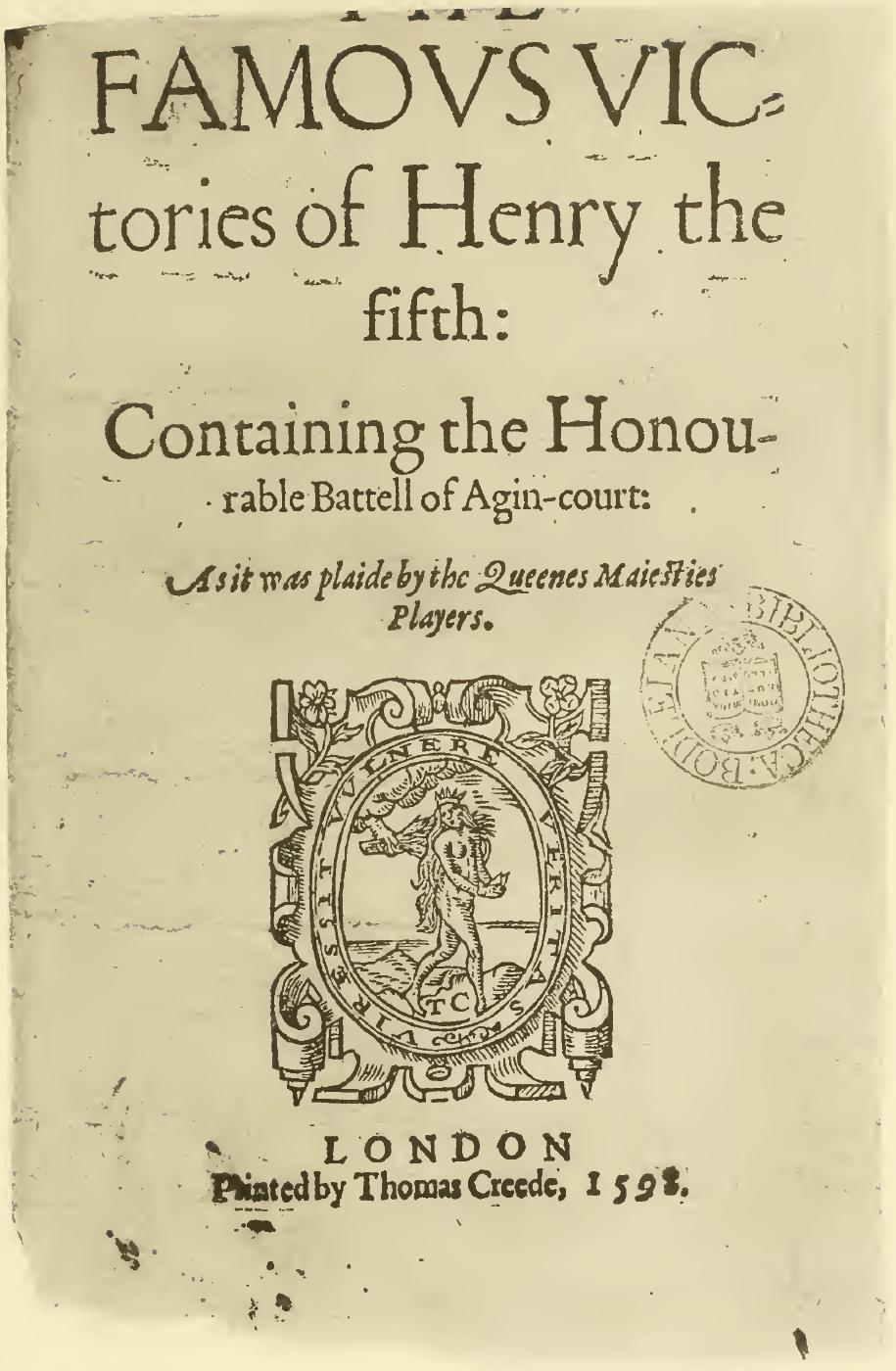
- Title page of 1598 quarto
- Original language: English
- Written by: anonymous
- Subject: The life of Henry V of England
- Genre: History
- Setting: England, France

Premiere
- Date: 1580s (?)
- Place: London

The Famous Victories of Henry the fifth: Containing the Honourable Battel of Agin-court: As it was plaide by the Queenes Maiesties Players, is an anonymous Elizabethan play, which is generally thought to be a source for Shakespeare's Henriad (Henry IV, Part 1, Henry IV, Part 2, and Henry V). It was entered by printer Thomas Creede in the Stationers' Register in 1594, but the earliest known edition is from 1598. A second quarto was published in 1617.

The play covers the riotous youth of Prince Henry and his transformation into a warrior king, ending with his victory at Agincourt and his wooing of Princess Katherine. The work is of unknown authorship, and various possible authors have been proposed, including a young Shakespeare, though this view is not widely accepted by scholars.

== Characters ==
The English Court, Officials

- Prince Henry, later King Henry V
- King Henry IV
- Duke of York
- Earl of Oxford
- Earl of Exeter
- Archbishop of Canterbury
- Secretary to King Henry V
- Lord Mayor of London
- Lord Chief Justice
- Clerk of the Office
- Jailor
- Two Receivers
- Sheriff of London

Friends of Prince Henry

- Ned
- Tom
- Jockey (Sir John Old-castle)
- Thief (Cuthbert Cutter)

Tradespeople

- Dericke, a tailor
- John Cobler
- Wife of John Cobler
- Robbin Pewterer
- Lawrence Costermonger
- A Vintner's Boy
- An English Soldier

The French Court, Officials, Military

- Charles, King of France
- Katharine, Princess of France
- Dolphin, French Prince (Dauphin)
- Archbishop of Burges
- Duke of Burgondie
- Lord High Constable of France
- Herald

French Soldiers

- Frenchman
- 1 Soldier
- 2 Soldier
- 3 Soldier
- Jack Drummer
- French Captain

== Plot summary ==
Prince Henry and his companions have committed a robbery, stealing £1000 from two Royal Receivers. He meets Jocky Oldcastle and tells him of events. The Receivers, pursuing the robbers, bump into Henry who "forgives" them for losing the money, but also threatens them. They leave. He suggests to the others that they go carousing to spend the money in a tavern.

The Chief Justice hears about Henry's antics at the tavern, which include a drunken street brawl with drawn swords. He orders the arrest of the Prince and others. Local tradesmen comment on the events. One of them recognises a Thief, whom they take into custody. The Thief insists that he is a servant of Prince Henry who will get him released. Meanwhile, King Henry IV laments the shameful lifestyle of his son. He questions the Chief Justice about the arrest of the Prince. The Justice explains his actions and King Henry accepts their validity. He calls for his son to be brought to him.

Prince Henry has been released. Angry at the Chief Justice, he tells Jocky and his companions that when he is king they shall have major positions of state. The Justice is arraigning the Thief when Prince Henry and his gang arrive. The prince insists that the Thief be released. When the Justice refuses, Prince Henry assaults him.

At his meeting with his father, Prince Henry is upbraided. His father tells him of his royal duties. Shamed, the Prince promises to reform his lifestyle. Meanwhile, the tradesmen act out a clownish version of the conflict between the Prince and the Chief Justice.

King Henry IV is dying. The Prince picks up the crown thinking that his father is dead. King Henry revives and upbraids him again. The Prince promises to be a good king. The old king dies. Now king, Henry V reneges on his promises to his old companions and banishes them. Henry discusses his claim to the French throne with the Archbishop. The Dauphin of France sends tennis balls as a present to King Henry as an insult. Henry prepares for war with France.

One of the tradesmen, John Cobler, has been fighting with his wife. His friend Dericke intervenes. A soldier arrives to force the two men to join the royal army. They are reluctantly recruited while the wife laments. The Thief is also pressed into military service.

In France Henry captures the town of Harfleur. The French send a large army against him. Henry defies them, insisting that he will not be ransomed but would rather die than accept defeat. Before the battle, French soldiers (speaking in comically garbled English) discuss how they will divide the spoils. At the Battle of Agincourt the English are victorious. Dericke is involved in clownish battlefield antics with a French soldier. After the battle he and John Cobler scheme to get out of the rest of the war by accompanying the deceased Duke of York's body back to England.

Henry then travels on to Paris where he negotiates with the French court and woos Princess Katherine. The King of France agrees to make Henry his heir and to marry him to Katherine.

== Parallels with Shakespeare's plays ==
The play covers the same ground later traversed in significantly greater detail in the Shakespearean trilogy, covering the wildness of the prince in several episodes, a coronation in which he dismisses the dissolute companions of his youth, and his invasion of France, victory at Agincourt, and eventual marriage to the Princess Katherine. More specifically, C.A. Greer identified fifteen plot elements that occur in both the anonymous play and in the Henry trilogy. These included the robbery at Gad's Hill of the King's receivers, the meeting of the robbers in an Eastcheap Tavern, the reconciliation of the newly crowned King Henry V with the Chief Justice, the new King's rejection of his comic/criminal friends, the gift of tennis balls from the Dauphin, and Pistol's encounter with a French soldier (Dericke's in The Famous Victories).

== Date and authorship ==
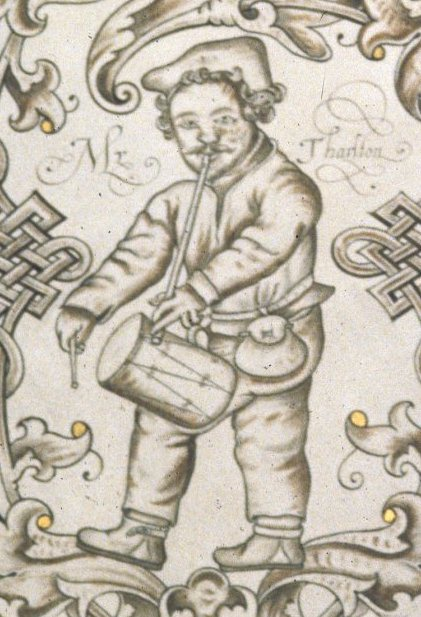
Richard Tarlton, the actor who played Dericke, and one possible author of the play

In 1891 F. G. Fleay attributed the play to comedian Richard Tarlton, who is known to have played the role of Dericke; in 1910 H. Dugdale Sykes attributed it to Samuel Rowley. In 1928 B. M. Ward suggested the extant version was based on an early court masque written by Edward de Vere, 17th Earl of Oxford. Scot McCrea thinks this unlikely, but argues that the author was probably trying to flatter Oxford, as the role of his ancestor Richard de Vere, 11th Earl of Oxford is exaggerated in the text. Alice-Lyle Scoufos argued that Welsh scrivener and theatrical producer Henry Evans, who was associated with the Earl, was the most likely author.

In 1944 E. M. W. Tillyard claimed the play for the young Shakespeare, followed by Seymour Pitcher in 1961. Pitcher argued that annotations to Edward Hall's Chronicles were probably written by Shakespeare and that these are very close to passages in the play. This view has not received much support, but because of the play's "manifest verbal flatness", it has been widely argued that the published version of the play is a memorial reconstruction (based on memory rather than a manuscript).

Just as the authorship of Famous Victories is disputed, so too is its chronological placement in the development of the English drama. However, as published in 1598 the play is advertised as one acted by "her Queen's Majesty's Players", referring to Queen Elizabeth's Men, a company which, while surviving into the 1590s was in deep decline by 1590. It is generally agreed that Richard Tarlton, who died in 1588, played the clown role (Dericke) in the play and that William Knell, who died in 1587, played Henry. This is because of a record of a performance in which "Knel, then playing Henry the fift, hit Tarlton a sound boxe indeed, which made the people laugh the more". Scoufus, as mentioned, places it in around 1583; Ward argued for a date circa 1576. It is certain, however, that the play significantly antedates the canonical Shakespearean treatment of the same historical materials in Henry IV, Part 1, Henry IV, Part 2, and Henry V by some years.
