= Prince Hal =

Henry Plantagenet
- Henriad character
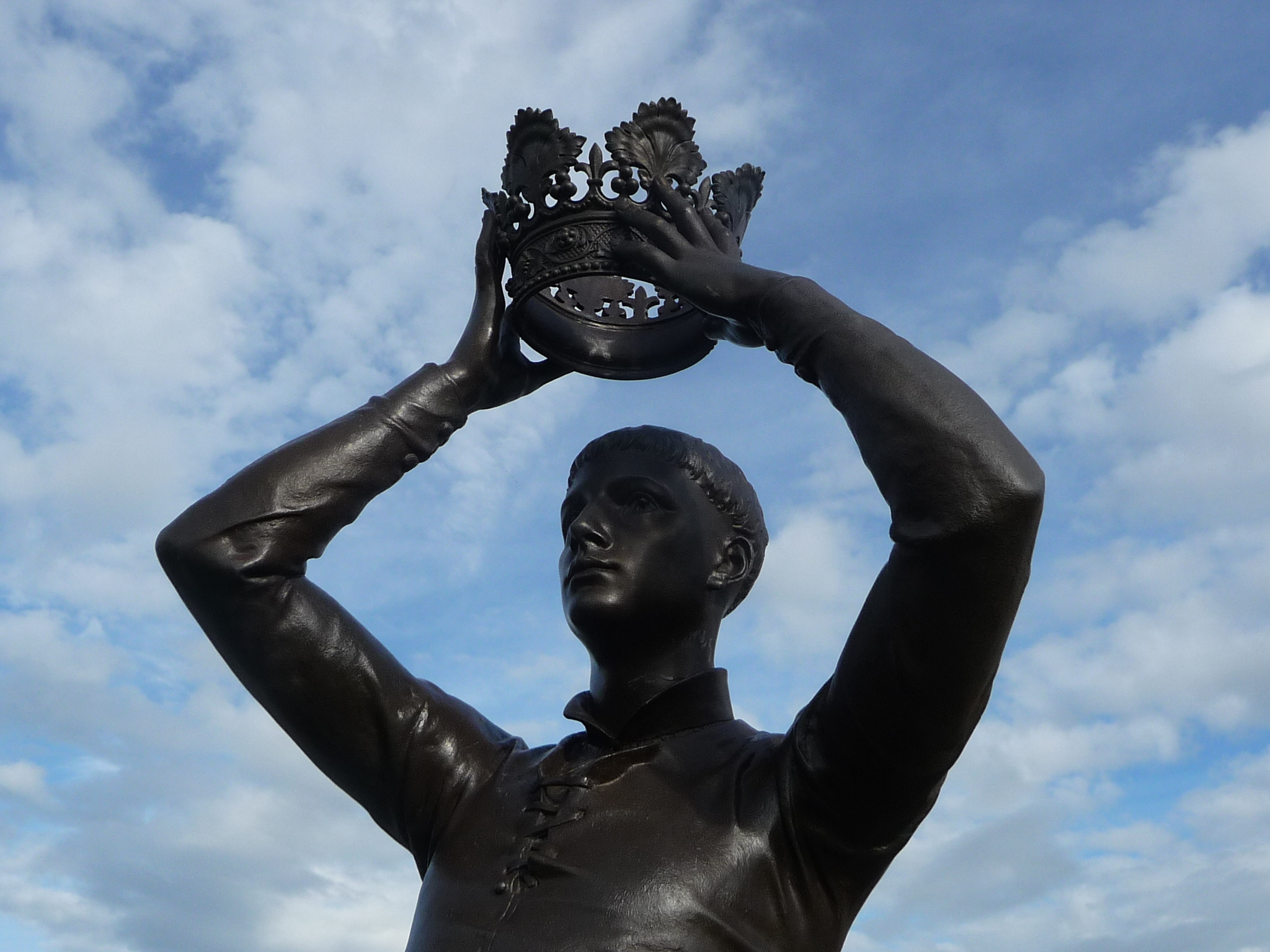
- Ronald Gower's sculpture in Stratford-upon-Avon depicting Prince Hal trying on the crown
- First appearance: Henry IV, Part 1
- Last appearance: Henry V
- Created by: William Shakespeare

In-universe information
- Gender: Male
- Occupation: heir to the throne of England
- Religion: Christian
- Nationality: English

Prince Hal is the standard term used in literary criticism to refer to William Shakespeare's fictional portrayal of the young Henry V of England as a prince before his accession to the throne, taken from the diminutive form of his name used in the plays almost exclusively by Falstaff. Henry is called "Prince Hal" in critical commentary on his character in Henry IV, Part 1 and Henry IV, Part 2, though also sometimes in Henry V when discussed in the context of the wider Henriad. Hal is portrayed as a wayward youth who enjoys the company of petty criminals and wastrels. This depiction draws on exaggerations of the historical Prince Henry's supposed behaviour in his youth. Critics have widely discussed the question of whether Hal's character is cynical or sincere.

== Name ==
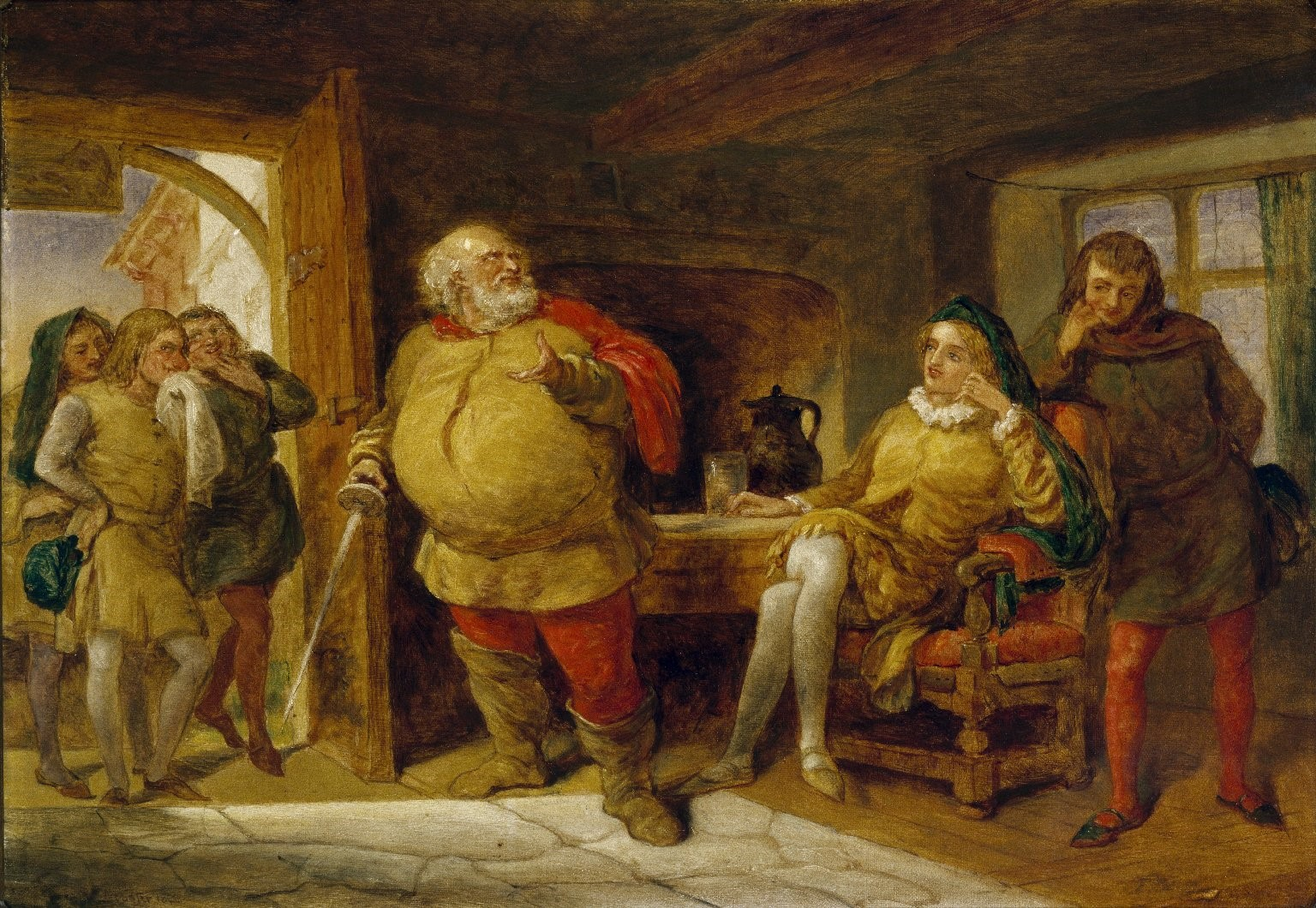
Hal listens to Falstaff's lies in Henry IV, Part 1.

In the two plays, the diminutive "Hal" is only ever used of the prince, not of any of the other characters named "Henry". It is only one of the several versions of "Henry" used. In fact the prince is variously referred to in the plays as "Hal", "Harry" and "Harry Monmouth", but never as "Henry". Only Falstaff and Poins ever call the prince "Hal", and Poins does so only twice. In the two plays, Falstaff does so forty times, even hailing him as "King Hal" at his coronation.

In Part 1, the name "Harry" is most commonly used to refer to Harry Hotspur, who is set up as the dramatic foil of the prince. The prince himself is typically called "Harry" when the two are being contrasted. In Part 2, "Harry" is most commonly used when he is being compared to his father, notably at the end by Henry V himself when he refers to the Turkish tradition of killing a newly installed king's brothers, saying that his own brothers should not worry, as "not Amurath an Amurath succeeds,/But Harry Harry". In Henry V he is never called Hal, only Harry. His official royal name "Henry" is only used once, in the play's final scene, when he tells his future queen Katherine that "England is thine, Ireland is thine, France is thine, and Henry Plantagenet is thine".

== Character ==
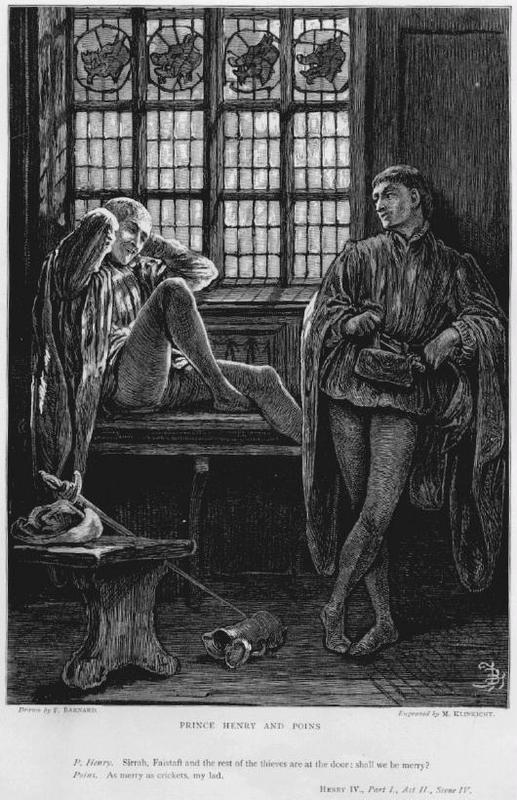
Hal and Ned Poins

There has been longstanding debate about the character of Hal in the two Henry IV plays, particularly concerning the extent to which Hal's riotous and rebellious behaviour is authentic and to what extent it is wholly staged by the prince for effect. The portrayal of Hal as a son in conflict with his father derives from stories that circulated in English popular culture before Shakespeare. These had previously been portrayed in the anonymous play The Famous Victories of Henry V, in which Hal's criminal and riotous behaviour is depicted as entirely unfeigned. In Shakespeare's plays Hal has soliloques in which he says that he is self-consciously adopting a wayward lifestyle to surprise and impress people by his later apparent character transformation:

I know you all, and will awhile uphold
The unyoked humour of your idleness:
Yet herein will I imitate the sun,
Who doth permit the base contagious clouds
To smother up his beauty from the world,
That, when he please again to be himself,
Being wanted, he may be more wonder'd at.

In Henry IV, Part 2, the Earl of Warwick suggests that Hal is fraternising with low-life characters to learn about human nature. He is "studying his companions" almost like learning a foreign language, which would include learning vulgar and offensive words, but only "to be known and hated".

== Sources ==
The stories probably derive from the conflicts between supporters of the young Henry and his father when he was acting as regent for his sick father in 1411 as head of the royal council. The prince was removed from the council by his father after he had defied the king's wishes by persuading it to declare war on France. He was replaced by his younger brother Thomas of Lancaster. This incident is alluded to in Henry IV, Part 1, when the king says "Thy place in council thou hast rudely lost. / Which by thy younger brother is supplied", but it is stated that this was because of the prince's "inordinate and low desires", rather than any political disagreements.

Stories about Henry's supposedly riotous early life emerge after his death in chronicles commissioned by his brother Humphrey, Duke of Gloucester, who wished to emphasise how pious and ascetic his brother had become during his reign. According to Thomas Elmham "He fervently followed the service of Venus as well as of Mars, as a young man might he burned with her torches, and other insolences accompanied the years of his untamed youth." Tito Livio Frulovisi in Vita Henrici Quinti also says, "he exercised meanly the feats of Venus and Mars and other pastimes of youth for so long as the king his father lived."
