= Henriad =

Term for some Shakespearean history plays

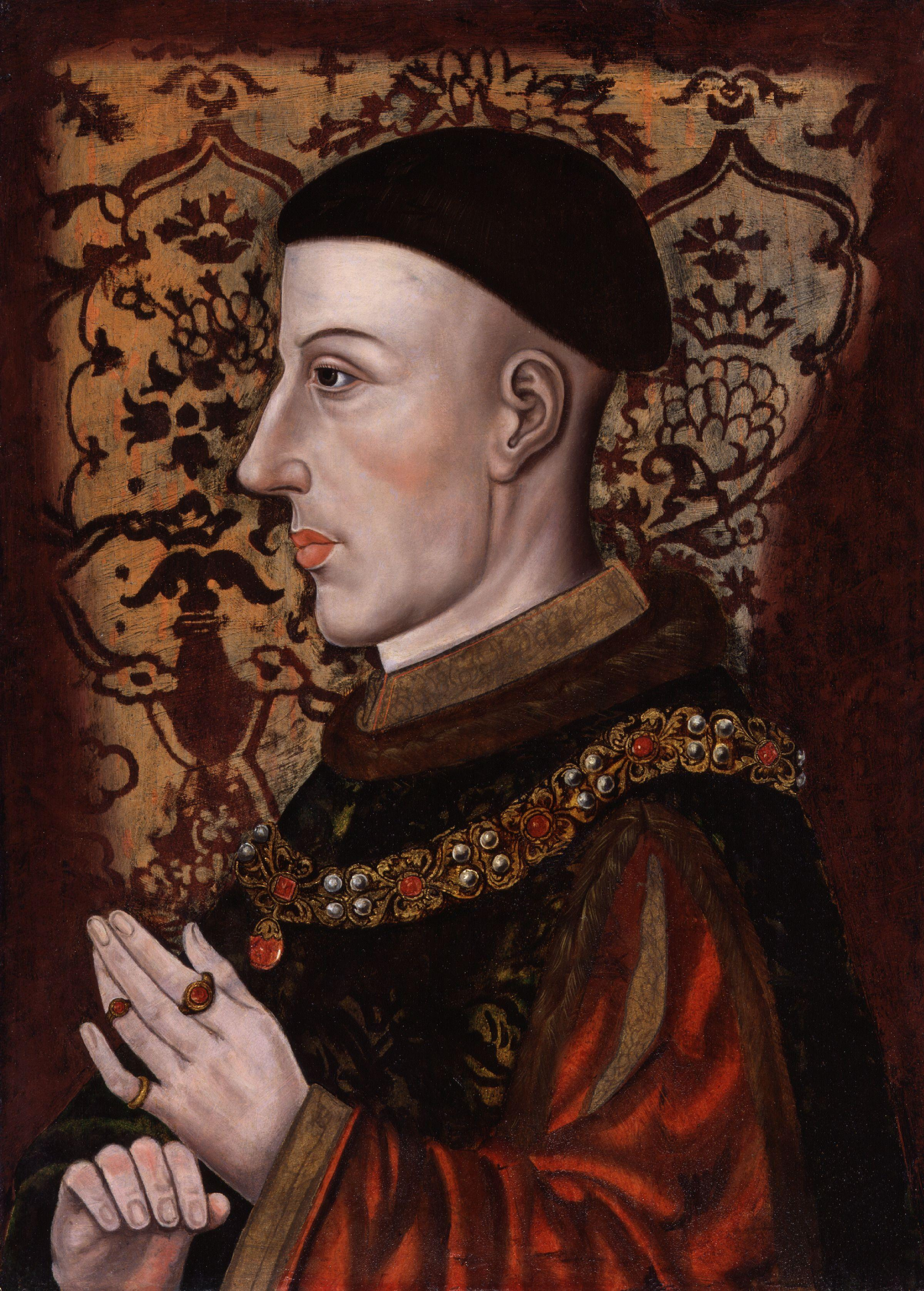
King Henry V

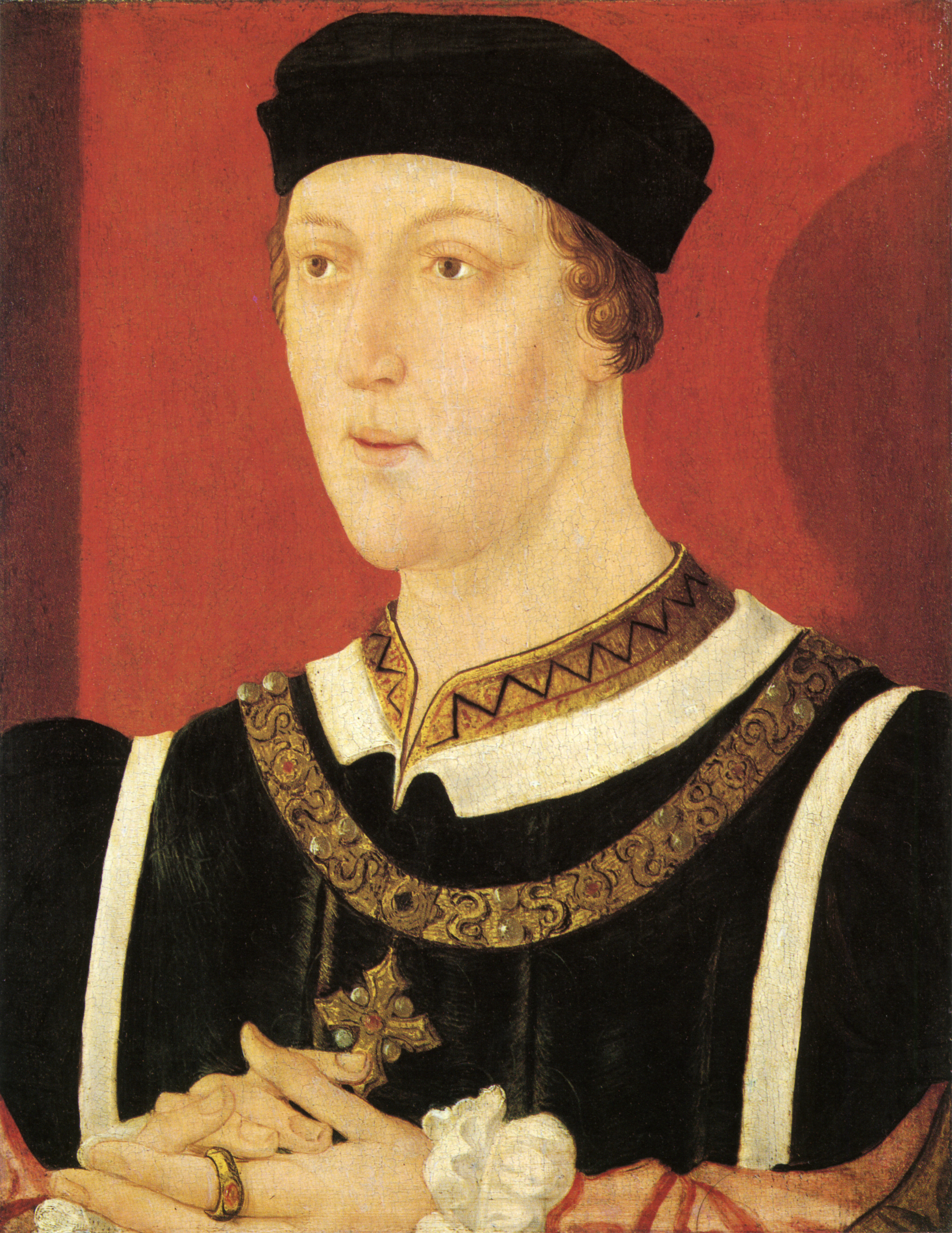
King Henry VI

In Shakespearean scholarship, the Henriad refers to a group of William Shakespeare's history plays depicting the rise of the English kings. It is sometimes used to refer to a group of four plays (a tetralogy), but some sources and scholars use the term to refer to eight plays.

In the narrow sense, the Henriad refers to Richard II; Henry IV, Part 1; Henry IV, Part 2; and Henry V — with the implication that these four plays are Shakespeare's epic, and that Prince Hal, who later becomes Henry V, is the epic hero. (This group may also be referred to as the "second tetralogy" or "second Henriad".) (Swinburne had excluded even Richard II from the group.)

In the wider sense, the Henriad refers to eight plays: the tetralogy mentioned above, plus four plays that were written earlier, based on the civil wars now known as The Wars of the Roses — Henry VI, Part 1; Henry VI, Part 2; Henry VI, Part 3; and Richard III.

== The second tetralogy ==
The term Henriad was popularised by Alvin Kernan in his 1969 article, "The Henriad: Shakespeare's Major History Plays" to suggest that the four plays of the second tetralogy (Richard II; Henry IV, Part 1; Henry IV, Part 2; and Henry V), when considered together as a group, or a dramatic tetralogy, have coherence and characteristics that are the primary qualities associated with literary epic: "large-scale heroic action involving many men and many activities tracing the movement of a nation or people through violent change from one condition to another." In this context Kernan sees the four plays as analogous to Homer's Iliad, Virgil's Aeneid, Voltaire's Henriade, and Milton's Paradise Lost. The action of the Henriad follows the dynastic, cultural and psychological journey that England traveled as it left the medieval world with Richard II and moved on to Henry V and the Renaissance. Politically and socially the Henriad represents a "movement from feudalism and hierarchy to the national state and individualism". Kernan similarly discusses the Henriad in psychological, spatial, temporal, and mythical terms. "In mythical terms," he says, "the passage is from a garden world to a fallen world." This group of plays has recurring characters and settings. However, there is no evidence that these plays were written with the intention that they be considered a group.

The character Falstaff is introduced in Henry IV, pt. 1, returns in Henry IV, pt. 2, and dies early in Henry V. Falstaff represents the tavern world, a world which Prince Hal will leave behind. (This group of three plays is occasionally dubbed the "Falstaffiad" by Harold Bloom and others.)

== Eight-play Henriad ==
The term Henriad, following after Kernan, acquired an expanded second meaning, which refers to two groups of Shakespearean plays: the tetralogy mentioned above (Richard II; Henry IV, Part 1; Henry IV, Part 2; and Henry V), and also four plays that were written earlier and are based on the historic events and civil wars now known as The Wars of the Roses; Henry VI, Part 1, Henry VI, Part 2, Henry VI, Part 3, and Richard III. In this sense, the eight Henry plays are known as the Henriad, and when divided in two, the group written earlier may be known as the "first Henriad" with the group that was written later known as the "second Henriad".

The two Shakespearean tetralogies share the name Henriad, but only the "second Henriad" has the epic qualities that Kernan had in mind in his use of the term. In this way the two definitions are somewhat contradictory and overlapping. Which meaning is intended can usually be derived by the context.

The eight plays, when considered together, are said to tell a unified story of a significant arc of British history from Richard II to Richard III. These plays cover this history, while going beyond the English chronicle play; they include some of Shakespeare's greatest writing. They are not tragedies, but as history plays they are comparable in terms of dramatic or literary quality and meaning. When considered as a group they contain a narrative pattern: disaster, followed by chaos and a battle of contending forces, followed by the happy ending—the restitution of order. This pattern is repeated in every play, as Britain leaves the medieval world and moves towards the British Renaissance. These plays further express the "Elizabethan world order", or mankind's striving in a world of unity battling chaos, based on the Elizabethan era's philosophies, sense of history, and religion.

The eight-play Henriad is also known as The First Tetralogy and The Second Tetralogy; a terminology that had been in use, but was made popular by the influential Shakespearean scholar E.M.W. Tillyard in his 1944 book, Shakespeare’s History Plays. The word "tetralogy" is derived from the performance tradition of the Dionysian Festival of ancient Athens, in which a poet was to compose a tetralogy (τετραλογία): three tragedies and one comedic satyr play. Tillyard studied these Shakespearean history plays as combined in a dramatic serial form, and analysed how, when combined, the stories, characters, historic chronology, and themes are linked and portrayed. After Tillyard's book, these plays have often been combined in performance, and it would be a very rare occurrence for Henry VI, part 2 or 3, for example, to be performed individually. Tillyard considered each tetralogy linked, and that the characters themselves link the stories together when they tell their own history or explain their titles.

The theories that consider the eight plays as a group dominated scholarship in the mid 20th century, when the idea was introduced, and have since engendered a great deal of discussion.

King John is not included in the Henriad because it is said to have a style that is of a different order than the other history plays. King John has great qualities of poetry, freedom and imagination, and is appreciated as a new direction taken by the author. Henry VIII is not included due to unresolved questions regarding how much of it is coauthored, and what of it is written by Shakespeare.

== Three-play Henriad ==
In Algernon Charles Swinburne's book A Study of Shakespeare (1880), he refers to three plays — Henry IV pt. 1, Henry IV pt. 2, and Henry V — as "our English Henriade", and says the "ripest fruit of historic or national drama, the consummation and the crown of Shakespeare’s labours in that line, must of course be recognised and saluted by all students in the supreme and sovereign trilogy of King Henry IV and King Henry V." They are, according to Swinburne, England's "great national trilogy" and Shakespeare's "perfect triumph in the field of patriotic drama."

H. A. Kennedy (1896) refers to Henry IV pt. 1, Henry IV pt. 2, and Henry V, saying "taken together the three plays form a Henriade, a trilogy, whose central figure is the hero of Agincourt, whose subject is his development from the madcap prince to the conqueror of France".

== Authorship ==
Shakespeare is well established as the sole author of the plays of the second Henriad, but there has been speculation regarding possible co-authors of the Henry VI plays of the first Henriad. The 16th-century playwright Christopher Marlowe has been suggested as a possible contributor. In 2016 the editors of the New Oxford Shakespeare, led by Gary Taylor, announced that Marlowe and "Anonymous" would be listed on their title pages of Henry VI, Parts 2 and 3 as co-authors side-by-side with Shakespeare, and that Marlowe, Thomas Nashe, and "Anonymous" would be listed as the authors of Henry VI, Part 1, with Shakespeare listed only as the adaptor. This is not universally accepted, but it is the first time a major critical edition of Shakespeare's works has listed Marlowe as a co-author.

== Literary background ==
The plays that may have influenced, inspired, or provided a tradition for Shakespeare's Henriad plays include popular morality plays, which contributed to the evolution of British drama. Notable morality plays that focus on British history include John Skelton's Magnificence (1533), David Lyndsay's A Satire of the Three Estates (1552), and John Bale's play King John (c. 1538). Gorboduc (1561) is considered the first Senecan tragedy in the English language, though it is a chronicle play written in blank verse; it has numerous serious speeches, a unified dramatic action, and its violence is kept off-stage.

Out of this tradition the English chronicle play developed to carry on the tradition of the medieval moralities, to provide historic stories and memorials of historic figures, and to teach morality. When King Lear was published as a quarto in 1608 it was called a "true English Chronicle". Some notable examples of the English chronicle include George Peele's Edward I, John Lyly’s Midas (1591), Robert Greene's Orlando Furioso, Thomas Heywood’s Edward IV, and Robert Wilson's Three Lords and Three Ladies of London (1590). Holinshed's Chronicles (1587) contributed greatly to the plays of Shakespeare's Henriad, and also advanced the development of the English chronicle play.

== Criticism ==
In his book, Shakespeare’s History Plays, E. M. W. Tillyard's mid-20th century theories regarding the eight-play Henriad, have been extremely influential. Tillyard supports the idea of the Tudor myth, which considers England's 15th century to be a dark time of lawlessness and warfare, that after many battles eventually led to a golden age of the Tudor Period. This theory suggests that Shakespeare agreed with this idea and promoted it with his Henriad. The Tudor myth is a theory that suggests that Shakespeare, with his history plays, contributes to the idea that the civil wars of the Henriad were all part of a divine plan that would ultimately lead to the Tudors — which in turn would support Shakespeare's monarch, Elizabeth. The argument against Tillyard's theory is that when these plays were written Elizabeth was approaching the end of her life and reign, and how her successor would be determined was causing the idea of a civil war to be a source of concern, not glorification. Furthermore, the lack of an heir to Elizabeth tended to outmode the idea that the Tudors were a divine solution. (In the event, James VI of Scotland succeeded Elizabeth as English monarch in 1601 without any opposition or conflict, but it was of course impossible for 1590s Englishmen to know this.) Critics including Paul Murray Kendall and Jan Kott, challenged the idea of the Tudor myth, and these newer ideas caused the image of Shakespeare to change so much he now seemed to become instead a prophetic voice in the wilderness who saw the existential meaninglessness of this history of warfare.

If presented as one very long dramatic event, the plays of the Henriad would not cohere well together. In performance the plays can seem jumbled and tonally mismatched, and narratives are at times oddly dropped and resumed.

Numerous inconsistencies exist between the individual plays of the first tetralogy, which is typical of serialised drama in the early modern playhouses. James Marino suggests, "It is more remarkable that any coherency appears at all in a 'series' cobbled together from elements of three different repertories". The four plays (of the first tetralogy) variously originated from three different theatre companies: The Queen's Men, Pembroke's Men and Chamberlain's Men.

== An earlier use ==
An earlier use of the word "Henriad" to refer to a group of Shakespeare's plays occurs in a book published in 1876 titled Shakespeare’s Diversions; A Medley of Motley Wear. The author does not define the word, but indicates that the plays in which the character, Mistress Quickly, hostess of the Boar's Head Tavern, appears include "The English Henriad" as well as The Merry Wives of Windsor. The source also indicates that the number of plays she appears in is four — "one more than is granted to Falstaff". The four plays that Mistress Quickly appears in are The Merry Wives of Windsor, the two parts of Henry IV, and Henry V.

== Voltaire’s Henriade ==
The French critic and playwright Voltaire is known for making extreme criticisms of Shakespeare, which he would then balance with more positive comments. For example, Voltaire called Shakespeare a "barbarian" and his works a "huge dunghill" that contains some pearls. Voltaire wrote an epic poem titled La Henriade (1723), which is sometimes translated as Henriade. Voltaire's poem is based on Henry IV of France (1553–1610). Swinburne remarks that Shakespeare's Henriad "differs from Voltaire’s as Zaïre [a tragedy written by Voltaire] differs from Othello."

== Broadcast productions ==
- 1960: An Age of Kings
- 1979: BBC Television Shakespeare
- 2012 & 2016: The Hollow Crown, BBC2

tetralogies of "expanded Henriad"	approx. dates written	years covered	plays
First Henriad	1591–1594	1422–1485	Henry VI, Parts 1, 2, 3; Richard III
(Second) Henriad	1595–1599	1398–1415	Richard II; Henry IV, Parts 1, 2; Henry V
