= When You See Me You Know Me =

Early Jacobean history play

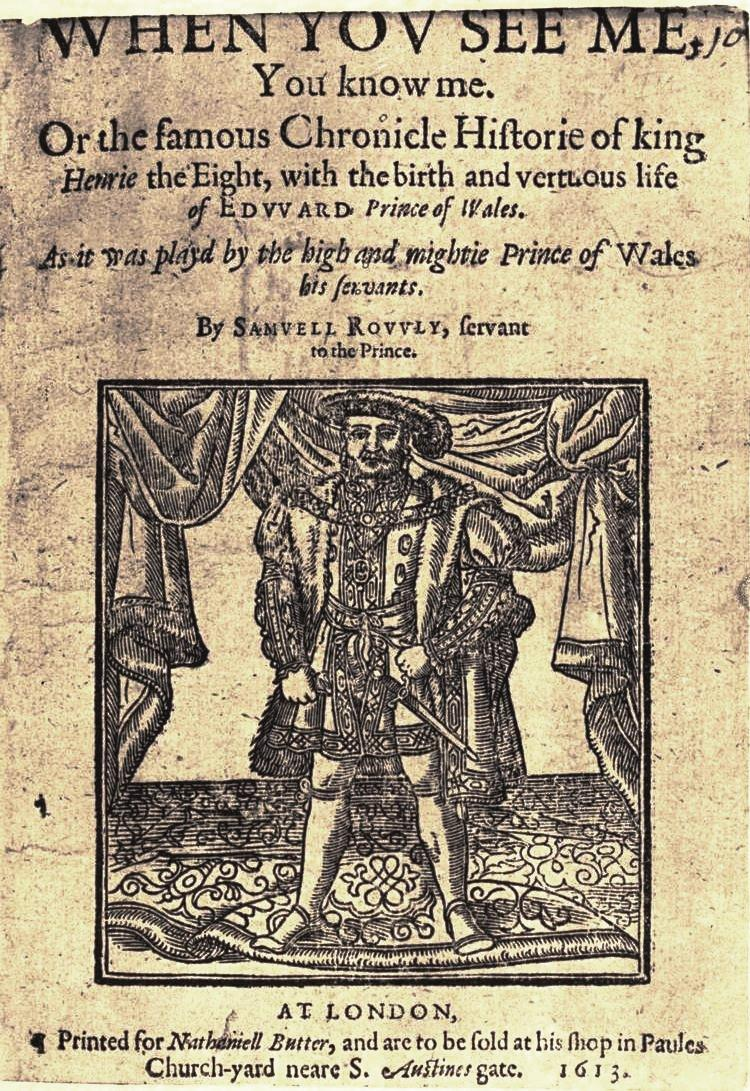
Title page of the second edition of When You See Me You Know Me (1613)

When You See Me You Know Me is an early Jacobean history play about Henry VIII, written by Samuel Rowley and first published in 1605.

The play was acted by Prince Henry's Men, the company to which Rowley belonged through most of his acting career, and premiered most likely in 1604 at the Fortune Theatre. It was entered into the Stationers' Register on 12 February 1605, and printed in the same year in quarto for the bookseller Nathaniel Butter. A second quarto was issued in 1613, the year in which Shakespeare's and Fletcher's Henry VIII was performed, and further editions appeared in 1621 and 1632.

Inevitably, Rowley had to take a selective approach to the vast subject of Henry VIII's biography; he chose to emphasise the King's conflict with Cardinal Thomas Wolsey and the birth and early education of Edward VI. Rowley's approach is loose and broadly synthetic: the events depicted in the play actually spread over three decades (1514–44); Wolsey is still alive at the end of the play, though he should have been long dead. The young Edward is depicted as an incipient hero of Protestantism, defending his sister Elizabeth and Thomas Cranmer when they are accused of treason.

Rowley also shows the King going out in disguise to mingle with his subjects, as in the legends surrounding Harun al-Rashid and similar figures. Henry is even shown getting into brawls and being arrested. Comic relief is provided by scenes of the King with his jester Will Summers.

Rowley's play has been cited as a "probable source" for Shakespeare's and Fletcher's Henry VIII. Scholars have also noted links between When You See Me and the "B text" or 1616 version of Marlowe's Doctor Faustus. The Diary of Philip Henslowe records a payment to Rowley for additions to Marlowe's play in Nov. 1602. The common features between When You See Me and Faustus have been employed in an effort to trace Rowley's contribution to the B text.
