= Edward IV (play) =

Two-part Elizabethan history play attributed to Thomas Heywood

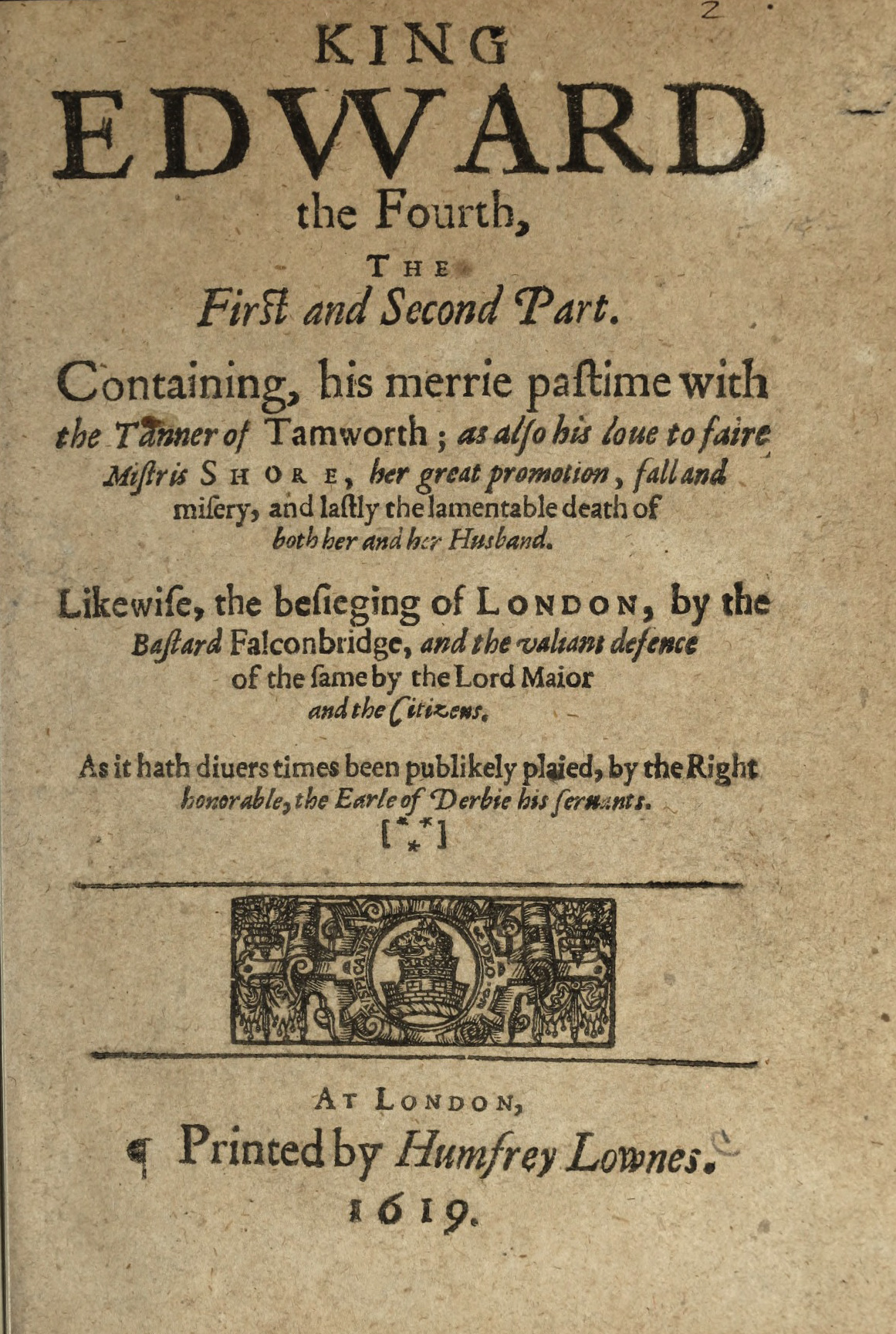
Title page of the 1619 edition

Edward IV, Parts 1 and 2 is a two-part Elizabethan history play centring on the personal life of King Edward IV of England. It was published without an author's name attached, but is often attributed to Thomas Heywood, perhaps writing with collaborators.

== Publication history ==
The two parts were entered into the Stationers' Register together on 28 August 1599, and were published together later that year in a quarto issued by the bookseller John Oxenbridge. The title page of the first edition states that the play was acted by "the Earl of Derby his servants". A second quarto was released in 1600 by Oxenbridge and Humphrey Lownes. The play was popular, and was reprinted in 1605, 1613, 1619, and 1626. All of the early quartos were anonymous; Heywood was first connected with the plays by Francis Kirkman in his 1661 play list.

== Plot ==
The central character in the play is Jane Shore, the king's mistress. The historical events of the reign of Edward IV form a background, involving "the bastard Faulconbridge," the "Tanner of Tamworth," and other figures of the era. The play draws material from the 1587 edition of Holinshed's Chronicles.

The play shows Edward wooing Jane, Jane struggling with the morality of accepting the king's offers, but using her influence to grant pardons to those wrongfully punished. In the end she expresses regret for her relationship with Edward. After Edward's death she is cast out by the new king Richard III. In this version of events, Jane is reconciled with her husband right before dying. They are buried together in a ditch which is named "Shores Ditch, as in the memory of them". This is supposed to be the origin of the name Shoreditch.

== Author ==
The play has often been attributed to Heywood; the normally cautious W. W. Greg regarded it as "undoubtedly Heywood's" — though the rarely cautious F. G. Fleay demurred. Some scholars have dated the play as early as 1594; others have favored a date toward the end of that decade. The records of theatre manager Philip Henslowe show that Henry Chettle and John Day were working on a play about Jane Shore in May 1603 for Worcester's Men, the company with which Heywood was associated at the time. A play on Jane Shore was popular in the first decade of the 17th century, and is mentioned in The Knight of the Burning Pestle (1607) and Pimlico or Run Red-Cap (1609). In Part 1 of Edward IV, Act III scene ii, is a three-part song about the Battle of Agincourt that strongly resembles Michael Drayton's The Ballad of Agincourt — and Drayton was a regular writer for Henslowe c. 1600 and frequently collaborated with Chettle and others. All of these facts and factors, taken together, suggest that Edward IV was composed by Heywood, perhaps with other Henslowe house dramatists, and perhaps revised over a span of years by various hands.

== Performances ==
In 1607, a company of English actors touring Austria were at the archducal court of Graz; on 19 November they performed, for Archduke Ferdinand II and his duchess Maria Anna of Bavaria, a play called The King of England and the Goldsmith's Wife — which might have been Edward IV.
