= Samuel Rowley =

17th-century English actor and playwright

Samuel Rowley was a 17th-century English dramatist and actor.

Rowley first appears in the historical record as an associate of Philip Henslowe in the late 1590s. Initially he appears to have been an actor, perhaps a sharer, in the Admiral's Men, who performed at the Rose Theatre. After 1598, he assumed some non-acting responsibilities, helping Henslowe and Edward Alleyn manage the business affairs of the company. Yet he remained an actor as late as 1617, as he appears in the "plots" for plays including Frederick and Basilea (as Heraclius), The Battle of Alcazar (as an ambassador), and 1 Tamar Cam. He remained with the company through its successive patronage by Prince Henry and the Palsgrave.

As a writer, Rowley belonged to the crowd of collaborating playwrights who kept Henslowe and Alleyn supplied with new drama. Henslowe paid him for additions to Christopher Marlowe's Doctor Faustus; tradition, deferential to Marlowe, has assigned him the clown's bits in the 1616 edition. He wrote the now-lost Judas with William Borne (or Bird, or Boyle) and Edward Juby. He also wrote alone. His only extant solo work is When You See Me You Know Me (1603–5), a history of Henry VIII from the death of Jane Seymour to the visit of Charles V. He also wrote a play on Richard III and two apparent comedies, Hard Shift for Husbands and A Match or no Match—all three licensed shortly before his death, and none of which have survived.

On stylistic grounds, H. D. Sykes assigned him a share in The Famous Victories of Henry V, The Taming of a Shrew, and parts of Robert Greene's Orlando Furioso. These attributions are possible but not widely accepted, as the plays are associated with Queen Elizabeth's Men, a troupe with which Rowley is not otherwise associated. MacDonald P. Jackson used stylistic analysis to propose Rowley as the author the anonymous Thomas of Woodstock.

The long-uncertain question of his connection to the more-famous William Rowley was perhaps clarified by the discovery of his will in the 1960s: in this document, a brother named William is bequeathed all of Samuel's books. Samuel Rowley died in the parish of St Mary's in Whitechapel, where he had resided for decades.
