= Boar's Head =

Boar's Head may refer to:

- Boar's head
- Boar's head, see Boars in heraldry
- Boar's Head Feast, a festival of the Christmas season
- Boar's Head Inn, any of several current and former taverns in London and elsewhere
  - Boar's Head Inn, Bishop's Stortford, Hertfordshire, England
  - Boar's Head Inn, Eastcheap, London, England
  - Boar's Head Inn, Southwark, London
  - Boar's Head, Leigh, Greater Manchester, England
  - Boar's Head, Standish, Greater Manchester
  - Boar's Head, Stockport, Greater Manchester
  - Boar's Head Theatre, Whitechapel, London
  - The Boar's Head, Ripley, North Yorkshire, England
- Boar's Head Provision Company, a delicatessen food supplier
- Boar's Head railway station, formerly in Standish, Greater Manchester
- Boar's Head Resort, a hotel and resort in Charlottesville, Virginia
- Boar's Head Society, a former student society at Columbia University
- Attack on the Boar's Head, an operation in France in 1916

== See also ==
- At the Boar's Head
- "Boar's Head Carol"
- Boar's Head Resort Women's Open
- Horncastle boar's head
- Little Boar's Head Historic District, North Hampton, New Hampshire
