= Boar's Head Inn =

Name of various pubs, mostly in the UK

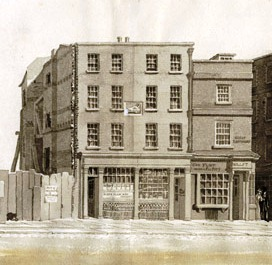
The Eastcheap Boar's Head Inn in 1829, shortly before demolition. The original Boar's Head sign is in the centre of the building, which was no longer an inn. On the ground floor are a perfume shop and a hat shop.
51°30′38.41″N 0°5′1.78″W

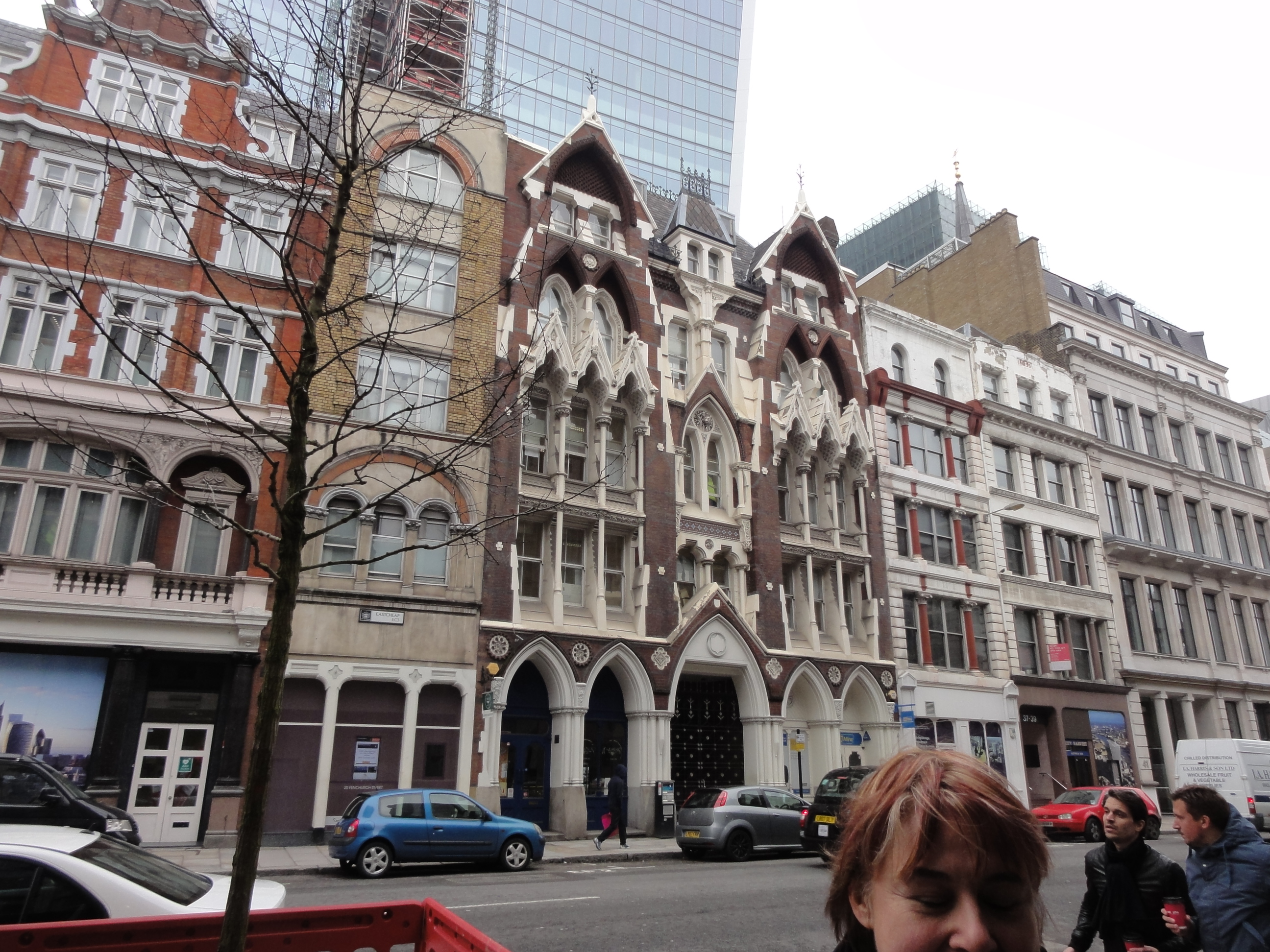
The current building near the location of the Eastcheap Boar's Head Inn. This was built as a warehouse in 1868. The exterior is decorated with references to the original tavern. It is currently an office building.

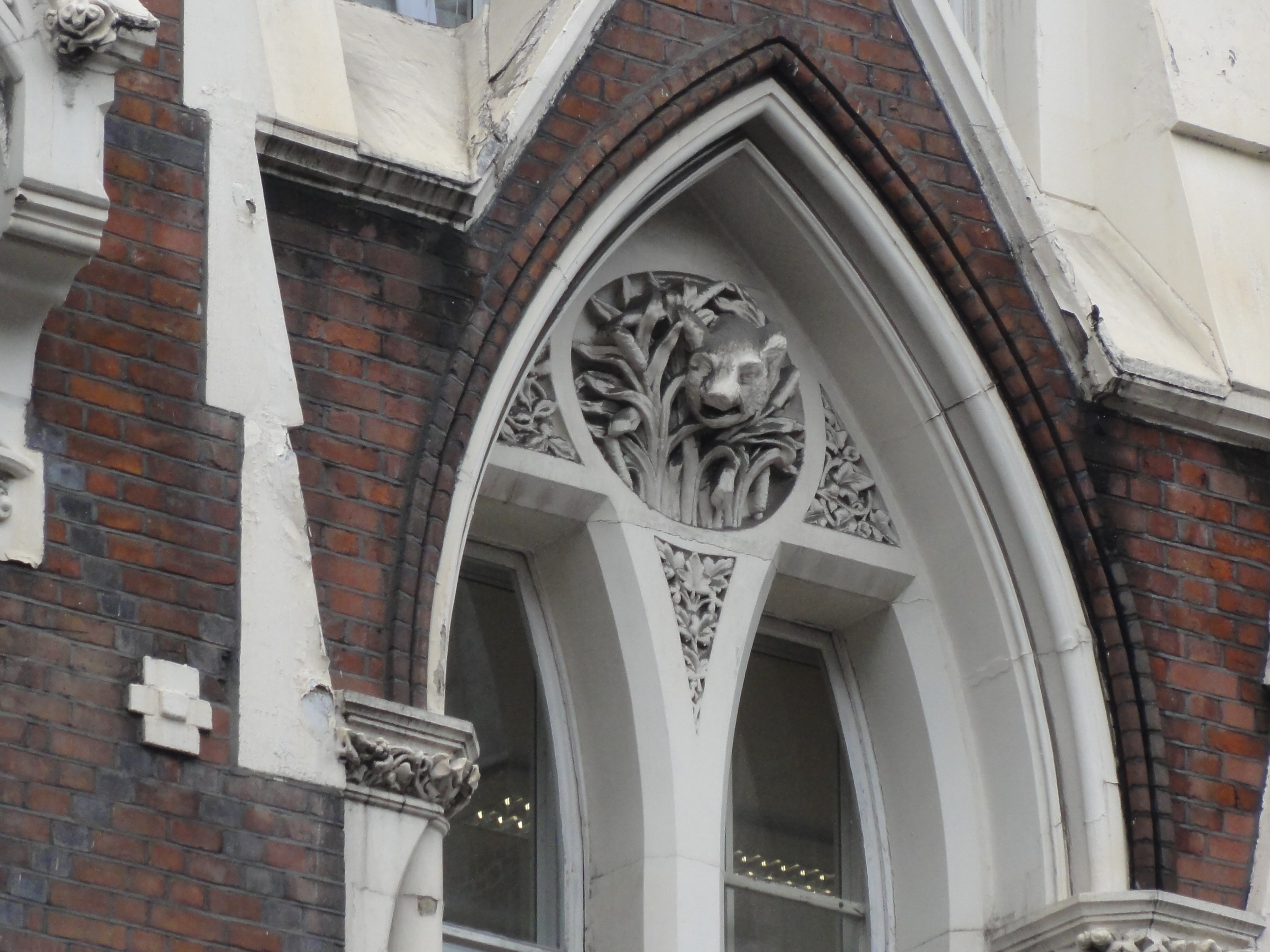
Close up, showing boar's head decoration

The Boar's Head Inn is the name of several former and current taverns in London, most famously a tavern in Eastcheap that is supposedly the meeting place of Sir John Falstaff, Prince Hal and other characters in Shakespeare's Henry IV plays. An earlier tavern in Southwark used the same name, and an inn of the name in Whitechapel was used as a theatre.

A number of other taverns and inns have since used the name, typically with reference to Shakespeare.

== In London ==
=== Eastcheap ===
The Boar's Head Tavern on Eastcheap is featured in historical plays by Shakespeare, particularly Henry IV, Part 1, as a favourite resort of the fictional character Falstaff and his friends in the early 15th century. The landlady is Mistress Quickly. It was the subject of essays by Oliver Goldsmith and Washington Irving. Though there is no evidence of a Boar's Head inn existing at the time the play is set, Shakespeare was referring to a real inn that existed in his own day. Established before 1537, but destroyed in 1666 in the Great Fire of London, it was soon rebuilt and continued operation until some point in the late 18th century, when the building was used by retail outlets. What remained of the building was demolished in 1831. The boar's head sign was kept, and is now installed in the Shakespeare's Globe theatre.

The site of the original inn is now part of the approach to London Bridge in Cannon Street. Near the site on modern Eastcheap, architect Robert Lewis Roumieu created a neo-Gothic building in 1868; this makes references to the Boar's Head Inn in its design and exterior decorations, which include a boar's head peeping out from grass, and portrait heads of Henry IV and Henry V. Roumieu's building originally functioned as a vinegar warehouse, though it has since been converted into offices. Nicholas Pevsner described it as "one of the maddest displays in London of gabled Gothic brick." Ian Nairn called it "the scream you wake on at the end of a nightmare."

=== Others ===
There was another Boar's Head Inn, at Whitechapel, the courtyard of which was used from 1557 onwards as an inn-yard theatre to stage plays, known as the Boar's Head Theatre. It was refurbished in 1598–1599.

There was yet another Boar's Head Inn, at Southwark, owned by Sir John Fastolf, who is the source for the character-name of Falstaff. While the Eastcheap Boar's Head Inn is not known to have existed during the reign of Henry IV, this inn may have.

== Other Boar's Head establishments ==
The Boar's Head Inn in Bishop's Stortford, Hertfordshire, England, is a historic building dating to the 16th or 17th century.

The Boar's Head Resort of Charlottesville, Virginia, US, a hotel and resort owned by the University of Virginia, is also known as the "Boar's Head Inn".

There is a Boar's Head Pub in Stratford, Ontario, Canada, where an annual Shakespeare Festival is held.

== See also ==
- "Boar's Head Carol"
- Boar's Head Feast
- Boar's Head Provision Company
- Boar's Head Resort
