= Boar's Head Carol =

English Christmas carol

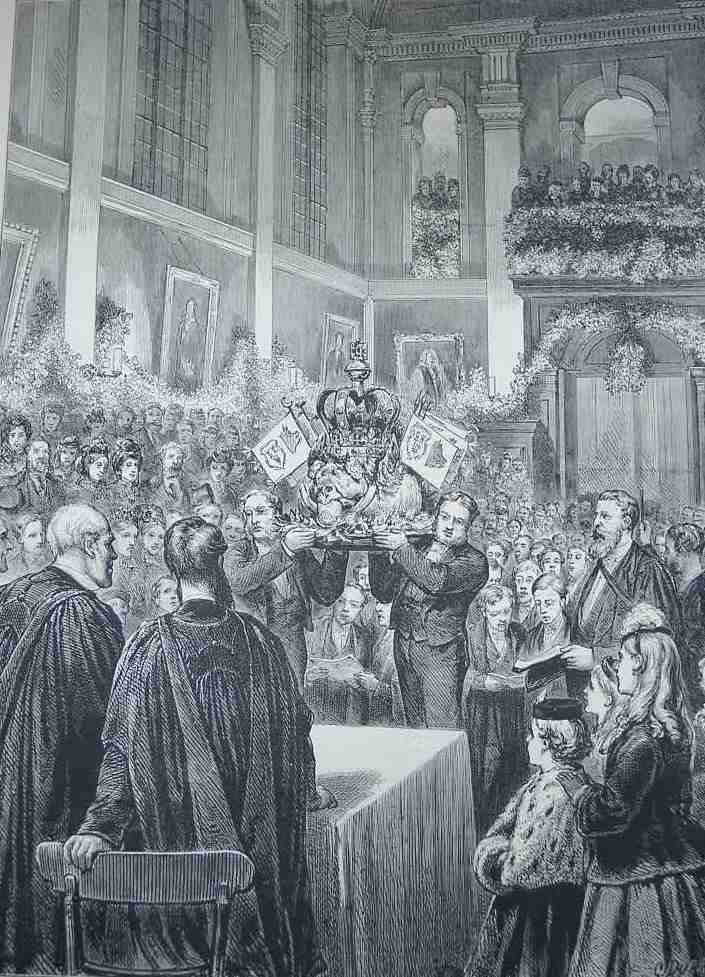
Serving up the Boar's Head at The Queen's College, Oxford, on Christmas Day

The "Boar's Head Carol" (Roud 22229) is a macaronic 15th century English Christmas carol that describes serving a boar's head at a Boar's Head Feast during Yuletide. Of the several extant versions of the carol, the one most usually performed today is based on a version published in 1521 in Wynkyn de Worde's Christmasse Carolles. A modern choral arrangement by Elizabeth Poston (1960) included in Carols for Choirs 1 is also widely performed.

== History and origins ==
Some folklorists have claimed that the boar's head tradition was:

initiated in all probability on the Isle of Britain by the Anglo-Saxons, although our knowledge of it comes substantially from medieval times. ... [In ancient Norse tradition] sacrifice carried the intent of imploring Freyr to show favor to the new year. The boar's head with apple in mouth was carried into the banquet hall on a gold or silver dish to the sounds of trumpets and the songs of minstrels.

In Scandinavia and England, Saint Stephen may have inherited some of Freyr's legacy. Saint Stephen's feast day is 26 December, and thus he came to play a part in the Yuletide celebrations which were previously associated with Freyr (or Ingwi to the Anglo-Saxons). In old Swedish art, Stephen is shown as tending to horses and bringing a boar's head to a Yuletide banquet. Both elements are extra-canonical and may be pagan survivals.

Jacob Grimm noted that the serving of a boar's head at banquets may also be a reminiscence of the sonargöltr, the boar sacrificed as part of the celebration of Yule in Germanic paganism.

== Lyrics ==
Boar's Head Carol
The tune for A Carol Brynging in the Bore's Heed

The Boar's Head Carol
A multitrack recording of The Boar's Head Carol

The boar's head in hand bring I, (Or: The boar's head in hand bear I,)
Bedeck'd with bays and rosemary.
And I pray you, my masters, be merry (or: And I pray you, my masters, merry be)
Quot estis in convivio ('as many as are at the feast')

Chorus
Caput apri defero ('the boar's head I bear')
Reddens laudes Domino ('rendering praises to the Lord')

The boar's head, as I understand,
Is the rarest dish in all this land,
Which thus bedeck'd with a gay garland
Let us servire cantico. ('let us serve with a song')

Our steward hath provided this
In honour of the King of Bliss;
Which on this day to be servèd is
In Reginensi atrio. ('in the hall of The Queen's)

There is also an alternative version of the same song with lyrics modified to fit poultry being served, replacing "The boar's head in hand bring I" with "The fowl on the platter see", and "The boar's head, as I understand / Is the rarest dish in all this land" with "This large bird, as I understand / Is the finest dish in all this land".

== Modern processions ==
=== England ===
- The Queen's College, Oxford: annual Boar’s Head Gaudy with Boar’s Head dinner. William Henry Husk, librarian to the Sacred Harmonic Society, wrote about the Oxford tradition in his Songs of the Nativity Being Christmas Carols, Ancient and Modern (1868):
  Where an amusing tradition formerly current in Oxford concerning the boar's head custom, which represented that usage as a commemoration of an act of valour performed by a student of the college, who, while walking in the neighbouring forest of Shotover and reading Aristotle, was suddenly attacked by a wild boar. The furious beast came open-mouthed upon the youth, who, however, very courageously, and with a happy presence of mind, thrust the volume he was reading down the boar's throat, crying, "Græcum est," and fairly choked the savage with the sage.
- Notting Hill and Ealing High School: a longstanding tradition. The head is actually papier-mâché.

=== United States ===
- Asylum Hill Congregational Church, Hartford, Connecticut: Boar's Head and Yule Log Festival since 1968.
- Christ Church Cathedral, Cincinnati, Ohio: Boar's Head and Yule Log Festival since 1939.
- The College of Arts and Sciences at the University of Rochester in Rochester, New York: Boar’s Head Dinner since 1934.
- Christ Presbyterian Church Ellwood City, Pennsylvania: Boar’s Head Festival since 1982.
- Make We Joy, Boar's Head carol and procession. Harkness Chapel, Connecticut College: 1981–2013; Mitchell College 2015–2019.
- Trinity Cathedral, Cleveland, Ohio: Boar's Head and Yule Log Festival since 1961.
- Grosse Ile, Michigan: Boar's Head Festival held every three years since 1980.

== See also ==
- List of Christmas carols
