= Symbel =

Feast in Germanic paganism

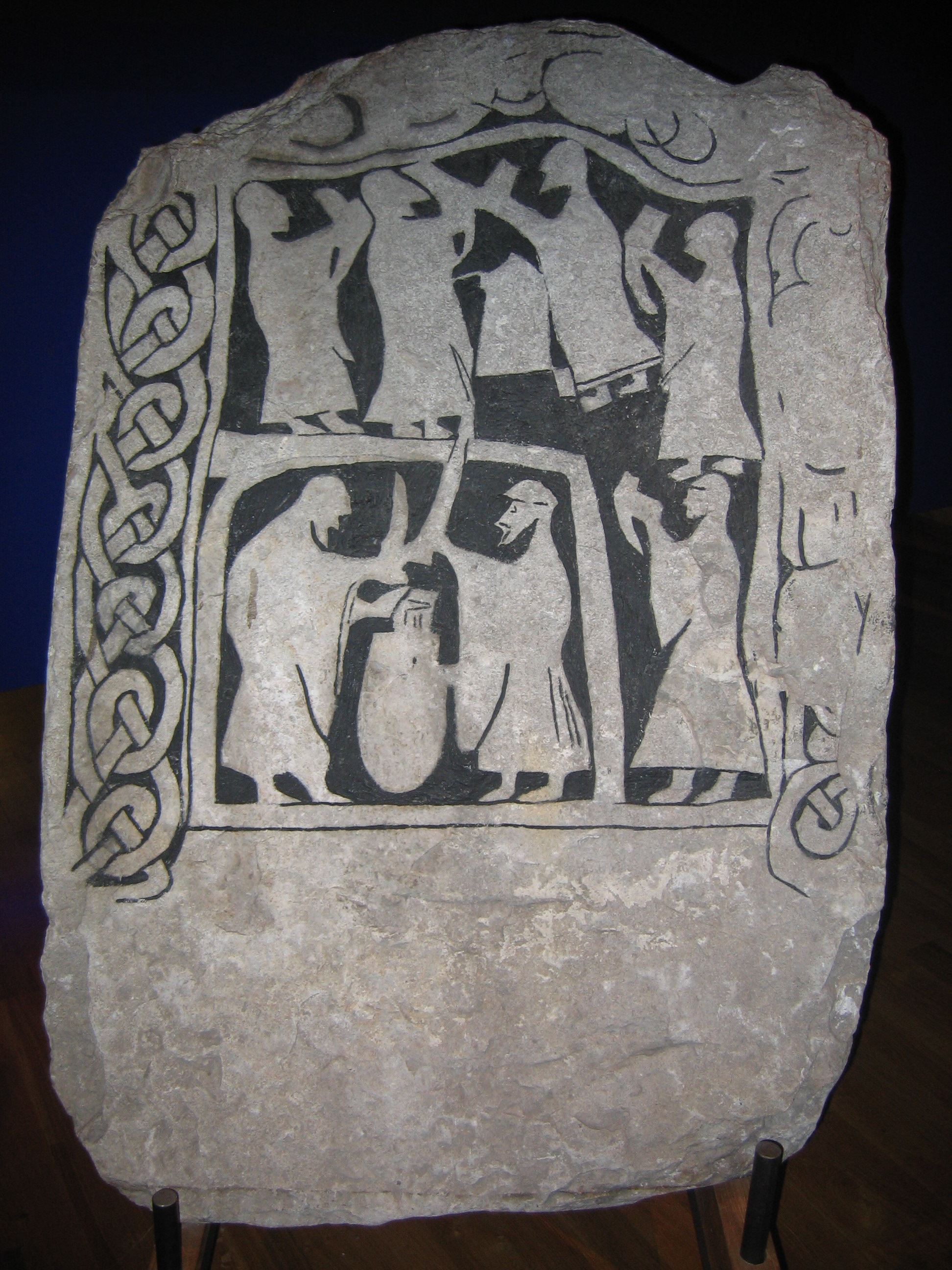
A drinking scene on an image stone from Gotland, in the Swedish Museum of National Antiquities in Stockholm

Symbel (OE) and sumbl (ON) are Germanic terms for "feast, banquet".

Accounts of the symbel are preserved in the Anglo-Saxon Beowulf (lines 489–675 and 1491–1500), Dream of the Rood (line 141) and Judith (line 15), Old Saxon Heliand (line 3339), and the Old Norse Lokasenna (stanza 8) as well as other Eddic and Saga texts, such as in the Heimskringla account of the funeral ale held by King Sweyn, or in the Fagrskinna.

Paul C. Bauschatz in 1976 suggested that the term reflects a pagan ritual which had a "great religious significance in the culture of the early Germanic people".

== Etymology ==
The prevalent view today is that Old English symbel, Old Saxon symbal, sumbal (Old High German *sumbal) and Old Norse sumbl, all of which translate roughly as "feast, banquet, (social) gathering", continue a Common Germanic *sumlan "banquet", which would correspond to a PIE *sṃ-lo- "joint meal" or "congregation" (literally, symposium or assembly).

A number of earlier scholars have argued for a borrowing from Latin symbola, Against this derivation (in the case of OE symbel), P.A. Erades argues that these cognates go back to Common Germanic *sumil or *sumal "gathering" (in the last case, with ablaut in the suffix). He explains the Germanic stem *sum- as ultimately deriving from Proto-Indo-European *sṃ- prefix, the zero-grade of ablaut of *sem "one, together". This is the same element which developed into copulative a in Ancient Greek.

Paul Bauschatz appears to accept sum, sam "together", but proposes that the word represents a compound with alu "ale" as its second element (rather than a suffix). This would render the meaning "gathering or coming together of ale".

The Old English noun is usually translated as "feast", and forms various compounds such as symbel-wyn "joy at feasting", symbel-dæg "feast day", symbel-niht "feast-night", symbel-hūs "feast-house, guest-room", symbel-tīd "feast time", symbel-werig "weary of feasting" etc. There is also a derived verb, symblian or symblan, meaning "to feast, caraouse, enjoy one's self". Not to be confused is the unrelated homophone symbel, symble meaning "always, ever".

== Anglo-Saxon cultures ==
In Old English poetry, especially Beowulf, feasts could be instrumental occasions to bind the community, secure the loyalty of warriors and to bolster their determination to perform heroic deeds.

- In Beowulf, Unferth the thyle (cf.: ON þulr) appears to act as a royal officiant at the feast which King Hrothgar organised for the Geatish newcomers, Beowulf and his companions. He challenged and questioned Beowulf, not eschewing taunts and mockery (flyting). Since no one intervenes during the incident, such behaviour appears to have been expected of him.
- In Beowulf, a warrior's boast (gielp, gylp) or his oath (beot) is often spoken at a feast.
- Another role commonly attested for during a feast was that of the scop (cf.: ON skald), who recited genealogies, folklore and metrical poetry.
- The alcoholic drink was served by women or alekeepers (ealu bora "ale bearer"), the first round usually poured by the lady of the house.

== Scandinavian cultures ==
=== Bragafull ===
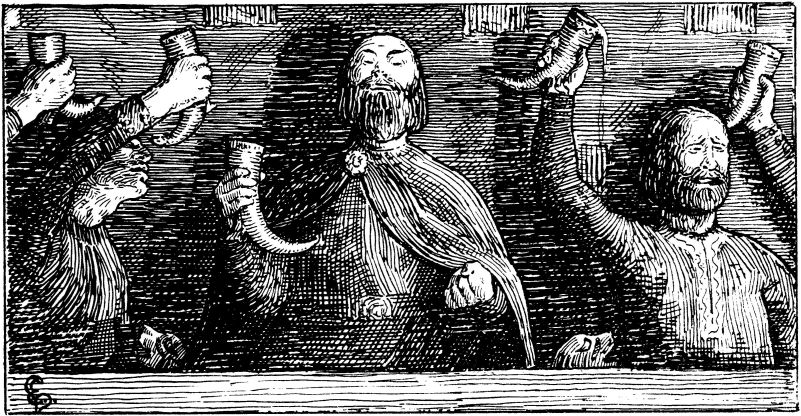
At the funeral feast of Harald Bluetooth, Jarl Sigvaldi swears an oath on his father's memory to go to Norway and kill or drive away Haakon Jarl.

The bragarfull "promise-cup" or bragafull "best cup" or "chieftain's cup" (compare Bragi) was in Norse culture a particular drinking from a cup or drinking horn on ceremonial occasions, often involving the swearing of oaths when the cup or horn was drunk by a chieftain or passed around and drunk by those assembled. The names are sometimes anglicized as bragarful and bragaful respectively.

That the name appears in two forms with two meanings makes it difficult to determine the literal meaning. The word bragr 'best, foremost' is a source for its first element. The form bragafull (but not bragarfull) can also be interpreted as 'Bragi's cup', referring to the Bragi, god of poetry, though no special connection to Bragi appears in any of the sources.

Snorri Sturluson in his Heimskringla, in the Saga of Hákon the Good, describes the custom of the bragarfull at feasts:

The fire was in the middle of the floor of the temple, and over it hung the kettles, and the full goblets were handed across the fire; and he who made the feast, and was a godi ['chief'], blessed the full goblets, and all the meat of the sacrifice. And first Odin's goblet was emptied for victory and power to his king; thereafter, Njörd's and Freyr's goblets for peace and a good season. Then it was the custom of many to empty the bragafull; and then the guests emptied a goblet to the memory of departed friends, called the minni ['remembrance'].

In Ynglinga saga section of the same work, Snorri relates:

It was the custom at that time that he who gave an heirship-feast after kings or jarls, and entered upon the heritage, should sit upon the footstool in front of the high seat, until the full bowl, which was called the bragafull, was brought in. Then he should stand up, take the bragafull, make solemn vows to be afterwards fulfilled, and thereupon empty the beaker. Then he should ascend the high seat which his father had occupied; and thus he came to the full heritage after his father. Now it was done so on this occasion. When the full bragafull came in, King Ingjald stood up, grasped a large bull's horn, and made a solemn vow to enlarge his dominions by one half, towards all the four corners of the world, or die; and thereupon pointed with the horn to the four quarters.

The Fagrskinna (a 13th-century history of the Kings of Norway), has a similar account in respect to Svein Forkbeard, mentioning first ceremonial drinkings dedicated to the greatest of one's kindred, then to Thor or others of the gods. Then the bragarfull was poured out and when the giver of the feast had drunk this, he was to make a vow, to be also sworn by those present with him, and only then to sit himself on throne of the deceased.

A prose passage inserted in the Poetic Edda poem Helgakviða Hjörvarðssonar relates:

Hedin was coming home alone from the forest one Yule-eve, and found a troll-woman; she rode on a wolf, and had snakes in place of a bridle. She asked Hedin for his company. "Nay," said he. She said, "Thou shalt pay for this at the bragarfull." That evening the great vows were taken; the sacred boar was brought in, the men laid their hands thereon, and took their vows at the bragarfull. Hedin vowed that he would have Sváva, Eylimi's daughter, the beloved of his brother Helgi; then such great grief seized him that he went forth on wild paths southward over the land, and found Helgi, his brother.

Hervarar saga ok Heiðreks relates that Hjörvard, the son of Arngrim, promised at his bragarfull to wed Ingeborg the princess of Sweden, and the legends of Ragnar Lodbrok relate that the Geatish jarl Herraud promised his daughter to anyone who could liberate her from a dragon or talk to her in its presence.

=== Minni ===
The term minni "remembrance, memory" was used for ritual drinking dedicated to the remembrance of the gods. Terms used in this context, both in the Eddaic poems and in the sagas, include minnis-öl "memory-ale", minnis-horn "memory-horn", minnis-full "memory-cup", minni-sveig "memory-draught". The term minnisveig is used by the annotator of the Sigrdrífumál before the valkyrie's invocation of the gods. Olafssaga has minniǫl signuð ásom "memory-ale dedicated to the æsir". "Memory-cups" dedicated to individual gods are also named Oðins full, Niarðar full, Freys full etc. The custom was continued uninterrupted by Christianization, and minni was now drunk to Christ, Mary and the saints (Krists minni, Michaêls minni, etc.).

But the minni given to gods or saints was only the most prominent instance of this custom, placed at the beginning of the ritual drinking. Later on, drinkers would also give minni to their departed friends. The term minni is the exact cognate of the Middle High German minne. The German word had the same meaning of "remembrance of absent or departed loved ones", but acquired the meaning of "romantic longing for an unattainable woman of higher status" in courtly culture, giving rise to the genre of Minnesang, and the personification of "remembrance" as Frau Minne.

== Bauschatz's theory ==
Paul C. Bauschatz in 1976 suggested that the term reflects a pagan ritual which had a "great religious significance in the culture of the early Germanic people".

The ritual according to Bauschatz was always conducted indoors, usually in a chieftain's mead hall. Symbel involved a formulaic ritual that was more solemn and serious than mere drinking or celebration. The primary elements of symbel are drinking ale or mead from a drinking horn, speech making (which often included formulaic boasting and oaths) and gift giving. Eating and feasting were specifically excluded from symbel, and no alcohol was set aside for the gods or other deities in the form of a sacrifice.

== Modern paganism ==
Inspired by Bauschatz' theory from the 1970s, the sumbel has become a central ritual of Heathenry in the United States. In this version, sumbel is a drinking-ritual in which a drinking horn full of mead or ale is passed around and a series of toasts are made, usually to gods, ancestors, and/or heroes of the religion. The toasts vary by group, and some groups make a distinction between a "regular" sumbel and a "high" sumbel, which have different levels of formality, and different rules during toasting. Participants may also make boasts of their own deeds, or oaths or promises of future actions. Words spoken during the sumbel are considered carefully and any oaths made are considered sacrosanct, becoming part of the destiny of those assembled.

The name sumbel (or symbel) is mainly derived from Anglo-Saxon sources. For this reason, the ritual is not known by this name among Icelandic Nordic pagans, who nevertheless practice a similar ritual as part of their blot.

In Theodism or Anglo-Saxon neopaganism in particular, the symbel has a particularly high importance, considered "perhaps the highest rite" or "amongst the most holy rites" celebrated. Symbel consists of rounds of ritual drinking and toasting, and invariably takes place within an enclosed space of some kind. It is usually inaugurated by three formal rounds, as determined by the host; often led by toasts in honor of the Gods, then ancestors and/or heroes, and then a general or personal boast. Other boasts may take place as necessary. Symbel is always formally closed once the formal boasts are completed, in order that the symbel might maintain its dignity and not degenerate into "mere partying". The two types of boast are the ȝielp (pronounced 'yelp') and the beot (pronounced 'bayawt', but as one syllable). The former is a boast of one's own worthiness, such as one's accomplishments, ancestry, etc. The latter is a boast of an action one plans to undertake. In order to protect the luck of the hall, such boasts are subject to challenge by the thyle, whose job it is to make sure that unlucky boasts do not contaminate the luck of all present.

== See also ==
- Alu (runic)
- Blót
- Drinking horn
- Kvasir
- Mead of poetry
- Tamada
- Toast (honor)
- Heitstrenging
