= Vow =

Promise or oath

A vow (Lat. votum, vow, promise; see vote) is a promise or oath. A vow is used as a promise that is solemn rather than casual.

== Marriage vows ==
Marriage vows are binding promises each partner in a couple makes to the other during a wedding ceremony. Marriage customs have developed over history and keep changing as human society develops. In earlier times and in most cultures the consent of the partners has not had the importance now attached to it, at least in Western societies and in those they have influenced. Protestants, for instance, consider marriage vow as an unchangeable divine law since it needs not only "conciliar assertion" but also the support of the Scripture, making marriage a form of divine ordinance.

== Divine vows ==
Within the world of monks and nuns, a vow is sometimes a transaction between a person and a deity, where the former promises to render some service or gift, or devotes something valuable to the deity's use. The vow is a kind of oath, with the deity being both the witness and recipient of the promise. For examples, see the Book of Judges. In the Roman Catholic Code of Canon Law, the vow and the oath are not considered acts of worship (cultus) like the liturgical celebration. However, they are considered acts of religion due to their sacred character, including the religious obligations they entail. Here, an important characteristic of the vow involves the manner by which non-Catholics are recognized to be capable of making a vow, which must also be fulfilled by reason of the virtue of religion.

The god is usually expected to grant, on entering into contracts or covenants with man, the claims his vow establishes on their benevolence, and valuing of his gratitude. Conversely, in taking a vow, the petitioner's piety and spiritual attitude have begun to outweigh those merely ritual details of the ceremony that are all-important in magical rites.

Sometimes the old magical usage survives side by side with the more developed idea of a personal power to be approached in prayer. For example, in the Maghreb (in North Africa), in time of drought the maidens of Mazouna carry every evening in procession through the streets a doll called ghonja, really a dressed-up wooden spoon, symbolizing a pre-Islamic rain-spirit. Often one of the girls carries on her shoulders a sheep, and her companions sing the following words:

Here we have a sympathetic rain charm, combined with a prayer to the rain viewed as a personal goddess and with a promise or vow to give her the animal. The point of the promise lies of course in the fact that water is in that country stored and carried in sheep-skins.

Secondly, the vow is quite apart from established cults, and is not provided for in the religious calendar. The Roman vow (votum), as W. W. Fowler observes in his work The Roman Festivals (London, 1899), p. 346, "was the exception, not the rule; it was a promise made by an individual at some critical moment, not the ordered and recurring ritual of the family or the State.' The vow, however, contained so large an element of ordinary prayer that in the Greek language one and the same word (Ancient Greek: εύχή) expressed both. The characteristic mark of the vow, as the Suda and the Greek Church Fathers remark, was that it was a promise either of things to be offered to God in the future and at once consecrated to Him in view of their being so offered, or of austerities to be undergone. For offering and austerity, sacrifice and suffering, are equally calculated to appease an offended deity's wrath or win his goodwill.

The Bible affords many examples of vows. Thus in Judges xi. Jephthah "vowed a vow unto the Lord, and said, If thou wilt indeed deliver the children of Ammon into my hand, then it shall be that whosoever cometh forth out of the doors of my house to meet me, when I return in peace from the children of Ammon, it shall be the Lord's, and I will offer it up for a burnt-offering." In the sequel it is his own daughter who so meets him, and he sacrifices her after a respite of two months, granted so she could "bewail her virginity upon the mountains." A thing or person thus vowed to the deity became holy and sanctified to God. (Jephthah could not have lawfully burned his daughter in sacrifice as it would constitute human sacrifice - something that God explicitly forbade. Some have suggested that his daughter remained unmarried and was given to serve the Lord in the temple.) It belonged to once to the sanctuary or to the priests who represented the god. In the Jewish religion, the latter, under certain conditions, defined in Leviticus 27, could permit it to be redeemed. But to substitute an unclean for a clean beast that had been vowed, or an imperfect victim for a flawless one, was to court with certainty the divine displeasure.

It is often difficult to distinguish a vow from an oath. A vow is an oath, but an oath is only a vow if the divine being is the recipient of the promise and is not merely a witness. Therefore, in Acts 23:21, over forty men, enemies of Paul, bound themselves, under a curse, neither to eat nor to drink till they had slain him. In the Christian Fathers we hear of vows to abstain from flesh diet and wine. But of the abstentions observed by votaries, those with no relation to the barber's art were the commonest. Wherever individuals were concerned to create or confirm a tie connecting them with a god, a shrine or a particular religious circle, a hair-offering was in some form or other imperative. They began by polling their locks at the shrine and left them as a soul-token in charge of the god, and never polled them afresh until the vow was fulfilled. So Achilles consecrated his hair to the river Spercheus and vowed not to cut it until he should return safe from Troy; and the Hebrew Nazarite, whose strength resided in his flowing locks, only cut them off and burned them on the altar when the days of his vow were ended, and he could return to ordinary life, having achieved his mission. So in Acts 18:18 Paul had shorn his head in Cenchreae, for he had a vow. In Acts 21:23 we hear of four men who, having a vow on them, had their heads shaved at Paul's expense. Among the ancient Chatti, as Tacitus relates (Germania, 31), young men allowed their hair and beards to grow, and vowed to court danger in that guise until they each had slain an enemy."

In Christianity, the vow has more weight than an oath when approached from the view that it binds one to God whereas the oath binds one to man. This was explained further by St. Thomas Aquinas, who said:

The obligation both of a vow and of an oath arises from something Divine; but in different ways. For the obligation of a vow arises from the fidelity we owe God, which binds us to fulfil our promises to Him. On the other hand, the obligation of an oath arises from the reverence we owe Him which binds us to fulfil our promises to Him.

== See also ==
- Albanian sworn virgins
- Marriage vows
- Religious vows (or monastic vows)
- Heitstrenging
