= Sonargöltr =

Boar, sacrificed as a part of Yule celebrations in Germanic paganism

The sonargǫltr or sónargǫltr was the boar sacrificed as part of the celebration of Yule in Germanic paganism, on whose bristles solemn vows were made in some forms of a tradition known as heitstrenging.

== Attestations ==
=== Hervarar saga ok Heiðreks ===
Hervarar saga ok Heiðreks refers to the tradition of swearing oaths on Yule Eve by laying hands on the bristles of the boar, who was then sacrificed in the sonar-blót:

Ok skyldi þeim gelti blóta at sónarblóti. Jólaaptan skyldi leiða sónargöltinn í höll fyrir konúng; lögðu menn þá hendr yfir burst hans ok strengja heit.

And they would sacrifice a boar in the sonarblót. On Yule Eve the sonar-boar was led into the hall before the king; then people laid their hands on its bristles and made vows.

=== Helgakviða Hjörvarðssonar ===
One of the prose segments in "Helgakviða Hjörvarðssonar" adds that the oaths were sworn while drinking the bragarfull toast:

Um kveldit [jólaaftan] óru heitstrengingar. Var fram leiddr sónargöltr. Lögðu menn þar á hendr sínar ok strengðu menn þá heit at bragarfulli.

That evening [of Yule Eve] the great vows were taken; the sacred boar was brought in, the men laid their hands thereon, and took their vows at the king's toast.

=== Ynglinga saga ===
In Ynglinga saga the sonarblót is used for divination (til frettar).

== Scholarly reception ==
The association with the Yule blót and with the ceremonial bragarfull gives the vows great solemnity, so that they have the force of oaths. This becomes a recurring topos in later sagas, although we have only these two saga mentions attesting to the custom of making vows on the sacrificial animal.

The choice of a boar indicates a connection with Freyr, whose mount is the gold-bristled boar Gullinbursti, and the continuing Swedish tradition of eating pig-shaped cakes at Christmas recalls the early custom. According to Olaus Verelius's notes in his 1672 edition of Hervarar saga ok Heiðreks, part of this jula-galt would then be saved for mixing with the seed-corn and giving to the plough-horses and ploughmen at spring planting. As Jacob Grimm pointed out, the serving of a boar's head at banquets and particularly at The Queen's College, Oxford, may also be a reminiscence of the Yule boar-blót. Gabriel Turville-Petre suggested that names for Freyr and his sister Freyja which equate them with a boar and a sow respectively implied that consumption of the sacrificed boar was believed to be consumption of the god's flesh and absorption of his power.

It was formerly usual to spell the word sónargǫltr and to interpret it as "atonement-boar" (the rare element sónar- can also mean "sacrifice"). However, following Eduard Sievers, it is usually now spelled with a short o and taken as meaning "herd boar, leading boar", as Lombardic sonarþair is defined in the Edictus Rothari as the boar "which fights and beats all other boars in the herd".

== See also ==
- Germanic boar helmet
- Gullinbursti - Boar owned by Freyr
- Hildisvíni - Boar associated with Freyja
- Sæhrímnir - Boar killed and eaten each night in Valhöll

== Sources ==
- Eduard Sievers. "Sonargǫltr". PBB 16 (1892) 540–44. (in German)
- Anne Holtsmark. "Sonargǫltr". Kulturhistorisk Leksikon for Nordisk Middelalder Volume 16, 1971. p. 433 (in Norwegian)
