= Heitstrenging =

Term for "oath swearing" in Old Norse

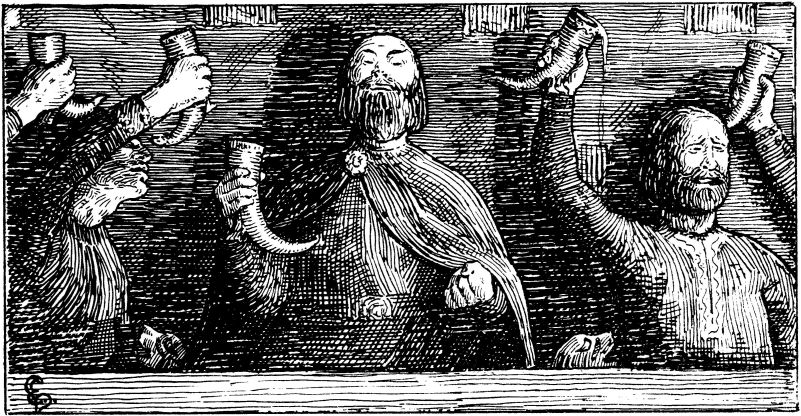
Earl Sigvaldi swearing an oath to conquer Norway at the memorial feast of Harald Bluetooth. Halfdan Egedius: Illustration for Olav Trygvasons saga (1899)

Heitstrenging (pl. heitstrengingar) is an Old Norse practice of swearing of a solemn oath to perform a future action. They were often performed at Yule and other large social events, where they played a role in establishing and maintaining good relationships principally between members of the aristocratic warrior elite. The oath-swearing practice varied significantly, sometimes involving ritualised drinking or placing hands on a holy pig (referred to as a sónargöltr) that could later be sacrificed. While originally containing heathen religious components such as prayers and worship of gods such as Freyr and Thor, the practice continued in an altered manner after the Christianisation of Scandinavia.

Close similarities have been noted between heitstrengingar and Anglo-Saxon oath-swearing and boasting practices such as the beot, with both involving promises to accomplish tasks that would bring great honour if achieved.

== Etymology ==
In Old Norse, the term heitstrenging or heit-strenging ('the swearing of a solemn vow') is derived from the verb 'heit-strengja' ('to vow'), in turn formed from the joining of heit ('a solemn vow') and the verb strengja ('to string', 'to fasten').

== Attestations ==
=== Helgakviða Hjörvarðssonar ===
Heitstrenging at Yule-evening is described in the prose of Helgakviða Hjörvarðssonar, involving placing one's hands on the bristles of the sónargöltr and drinking of the bragarfull:

Old Norse text

Heðinn var heima með föður sínum, Hjörvarði konungi, í Nóregi. Heðinn fór einn saman heim ór skógi jólaaftan ok fann trollkonu. Sú reið vargi ok hafði orma at taumum ok bauð fylgð sína Heðni. "Nei," sagði hann. Hon sagði: "Þess skaltu gjalda at bragarfulli."Um kveldit óru heitstrengingar. Var fram leiddr sónargöltr. Lögðu menn þar á hendr sínar ok strengðu menn þá heit at bragarfulli.

Bellows translation

Hethin was at home with his father, King Hjorvarth, in Norway. Hethin was coming home alone from the forest one Yule-eve, and found a troll-woman; she rode on a wolf, and had snakes in place of a bridle. She asked Hethin for his company. "Nay," said he. She said, "Thou shalt pay for this at the king's toast." That evening the great vows were taken; the sacred boar was brought in, the men laid their hands thereon, and took their vows at the king's toast.

=== Hervarar saga ok Heiðreks ===
Hervarar saga ok Heiðreks describes heitstrengingjar taking place in a similar manner to in Helgakviða Hjǫrvarðssonar. The principal manuscripts for the saga vary considerably with the account in manuscript H as follows:

Old Norse text

Heiðrekr konungr blótaði Frey; þann gǫlt er mestan fekk, skyldi hann gefa Frey; kǫlluðu þeir hann svá helgan, at yfir hans burst skyldi sverja um ǫll stór mál, ok skyldi þeim gelti blóta at sonarblóti; jólaaptan skyldi leiða sonar-gǫltinn í hǫll fyrir konung; lǫgðu menn þá hendr yfir burst hans ok strengja heit. Heiðrekr konungr strengti þess heit, at engi maðr skyldi svá mikit hafa af gert við hann, ef á vald hans kœmi, at eigi skyldi kost eiga at hafa dóm spekinga hans.

Modern English translation

King H[eiðrek] sacrificed to Freyr; the biggest boar available was to be given to Freyr; they considered it so holy that over its bristles should be sworn all oaths of great import; and that boar was to be sacrificed at the boar-sacrifice; at Yule eve the boar was to be led into the hall before the king, then the men laid hands on its bristles and swore oaths. King H[eiðrek] swore an oath that nobody should have injured him to such an extent that he would not grant him, if he came in his power, the judgement of his wise men.

Here, the ritual is dedicated to only Freyr, while in the U manuscript it is also to Freyja though this is typically amended to Freyr. The U manuscript furthermore describes the ritual and the involvement of the boar to be a custom at the time of the saga narrative and tells how there was an effort to breed the largest pig possible for the occasion. (Note: The association between pigs and Freyr are seen elsewhere, such as his steed Gullinbursti, his name Vaningi (which can also refer to pigs), and the prominence of pigs in the Swedish cult centred at Uppsala devoted to Freyr.)

=== Succession of Sweyn Forkbeard ===
==== Fagrskinna ====
In Fagrskinna, the term heitstrenging is used to describe the swearing of an oath on a bragarfull at Harald Bluetooth's memorial feast (Old Norse: veizluerfi):

Old Norse text

En þá er erfin váru gǫr eptir fornum sið, þá skyldi þat skylt at gøra þau á því ári, er sá hafði andazk, er erfit var eptir gǫrt. En sá er gøra léti erfit, skyldi eigi fyrr setjask í þess manns sæti, er hann erfði, en menn drykki erfit. Et fyrsta kveld, er menn kómu til erfis, skyldi skenkja upp mǫrg full með þeima hætti sem nú eru minni, ok eignuðu þau full enum ríkustu frændum sínum eða Þór eða ǫðrum guðum sínum, þá er heiðni var, en siðast skyldi upp skenkja bragafull ok þá skyldi sá, er erfit gørði, strengja heit at bragafulli ok svá allir þeir er at erfinu væri, ok stíga þá í sæti þess, er erfðr var, ⟨ok skyldi þá fullkominn vera til arfs ok virðingar eptir enn dauða, en eigi fyrr⟩

Finlay translation

And when memorial feasts were held according to ancient custom, it was required to hold them in the year of the death of the man in whose memory the feast was being held. And he who had the feast prepared must not sit in the high seat of the man whose memory he was honoring before men had drunk the memorial toast. The first evening, when people came to the feast, many toasts had to be offered up in the same way as memorial toasts are now, and they dedicated those toasts to their most important kinsmen, or to Þórr, or to other of their gods, in heathen times, and finally they had to drink the bragafull, and then he who was holding the feast had to make a vow on the bragafull, as did all those attending the memorial feast, and then he had to mount into the seat of the man who was being honoured, and he then entered fully into possession of the inheritance and honour of the dead man, but not before.

Later in the account, Sweyn Forkbeard swears on the bragafull to conquer England or die in the attempt, before claiming his inheritance, and Earl Sigvaldi does the same for Norway.

==== Óláfs saga Tryggvasonar and Jómsvíkinga saga ====
In Óláfs saga Tryggvasonar and Jómsvíkinga saga, accounts are given of the same memorial feast as in Fagrskinna. As in the other description, Sweyn's heitstrenging and toasting is required before the formal transfer of power can occur, however here, toasts are given to Jesus and Archangel Michael instead of to ancestors or a heathen god.

In Jómsvíkinga saga, after Earl Sigvaldi's vow, some of the men including his brother take turns to make greater vows, including not fleeing in battle, killing Thorkill Leira and raping his daughter.

=== Other accounts ===
Heitstrengingar are well attested in Old Norse sagas where they can play key roles in tales, such as Earl Herrauðr swearing to give his daughter Þóra in marriage to whoever kills the worm which has trapped her in Ragnars saga loðbrókar and Hrafnkell swearing to kill any who ride Freyfaxi, a horse dedicated to Freyr, in Hrafnkels saga Freysgoða. In the latter case, Hrafnkell reflects on his vow, saying "[o]ften we shall repent when we speak too much but seldom we would rue it if we had spoken less". In other attestations the oath is more symbolic, such as when Harald Fairhair promised to not comb or cut his hair until he ruled all of Norway.

In Harðar saga, Hróarr steps on a log at Yule before making a vow to break into the grave mound of the viking Sóti, followed by Hǫrðr vowing to accompany him and a third vowing to follow Hǫrðr, forming a formula also seen in Hrólfs saga kraka. Hænsa-Þóris saga presents an alternative way of performing heitstrengingar in which Hersteinn steps onto a stone with one foot before swearing an oath. (Note: Although not explicitly referred to as heitstrengingar, the swearing of oaths on stones is seen in the Poetic Edda in Helgakviða Hundingsbana II stanza 31, Guðrúnarkviða III stanza 3 and Atlakviða stanza 30.)

== Interpretation and discussion ==
Heitstrengingar took place at Yule and other sacrificial feasts, weddings, arvals, and banquets and often acted as a form of bragging and promising the performance of an often great feat. Their role has been argued to have been particularly royal remembrance feasts where, along with group toasting, it was performed by the new king who would swear to protect and strengthen the kingdom. The process involved making prayers to either Christian or heathen gods and honouring the previous ruler and has been proposed to have had a central role in both reassuring the king's followers and legitimising his power. Due to the ritual process, heitstrengingar usually came after the speaker was drunk.

Though it had been argued historically that the custom of heitstrenging died out upon the Christianisation of the North Germanic peoples, it is now accepted to have continued by that name at least into the second half of the 13th century based on Sturlunga saga which provides a contemporary account of the practice and is dated to that time period. It further records the practice at a battle which took place on Easter 1244 in which a chieftain vowed to never capture a man in a church. Heitstrengingar further became a recurring motif in later sagas.

Strong similarities have been noted between heitstrenging and Anglo-Saxon oath swearing practices, referred to by Old English terms such as beots, in which vows to affirm bonds among rulers and retainers often took place at feasts accompanied by drink and the giving of gifts such as rings. It has been further suggested that the tradition could have spread to the North Germanic peoples through contact with the Anglo-Saxons due to some of the earliest attestations of heitstrenging formulae are found in Old English sources such as Beowulf and the Battle of Maldon. Similar practices have also been observed dating to the High Medieval Period in France and among the slavic peoples, although scholars have not reached a consensus over, whether and to what extent, they are influenced by the Germanic traditions.

Heitstrengingar often appear in sources in conjunction with mannjafnaðr, a custom in which one vows to perform a deed which a companion of theirs (referred to as a jafnaðrmaðr) either could not do as well or which acts as an insult to them if he does not prevent or avenge it. It has been noted that this combination is also seen in an English context in the Breca episode of Beowulf.

== See also ==
- Animal worship
- Rings in Germanic cultures – objects used for oath swearing in Germanic cultures

== Bibliography ==
=== Primary ===
- Bellows, Henry Adam (2004). The poetic Edda : the mythological poems. Mineola, NY: Dover Publications. ISBN 9780486437101.
- Finlay, Alison (2004). Fagrskinna, a catalogue of the Kings of Norway. Leiden: Brill. ISBN 9789004131729.
- "Helgakviða Hjörvarðssonar (Old Norse)". heimskringla.com.

=== Secondary ===
- de Vries, Jan (1956). "Volume 1". Altgermanische Religionsgeschichte (in German). Berlin: De Gruyter. OCLC 747429.
- Einarsson, Stefán (1934). "Old English Beot and Old Icelandic Heitstrenging". PMLA. 49 (4): 975–993. doi:10.2307/458120. ISSN 0030-8129. JSTOR 458120. S2CID 163862150.
- Keary, Charles Francis (1892). Norway and the Norwegians. Scribner.
- Keyser, Rudolph (1868). The Private Life of the Old Northmen. Chapman & Hall.
- Kovářová, Lenka (2011). The Swine in Old Nordic Religion and Worldview. S2CID 154250096.
- Murphy, Michael (1985). "Vows, boasts and taunts, and the role of women in some medieval literature". English Studies. 66 (2): 105–112. doi:10.1080/00138388508598373. ISSN 0013-838X.
- Riseley, Charles Prescott (2014). "Ceremonial Drinking in the Viking Age". Universitet I Oslo. S2CID 192657317.
- Simek, Rudolf (2008). A Dictionary of Northern Mythology. Translated by Hall, Angela. BOYE6. ISBN 9780859915137.
- Williams, Mary Wilhelmine (1920). Social Scandinavia in the Viking Age. Macmillan. pp. 321–322.
- "Old Norse Dictionary - Heit". Cleasby & Vigfusson - Old Norse Dictionary.
- "Old Norse Dictionary - Heit-strenging". Cleasby & Vigfusson - Old Norse Dictionary.
- "Old Norse Dictionary - Heit-strengja". Cleasby & Vigfusson - Old Norse Dictionary.
- "Old Norse Dictionary - Strengja". Cleasby & Vigfusson - Old Norse Dictionary.
