= Beot =

Anglo-Saxon ritual boast

A bēot is Old English for a ritualized boast, vow, threat, or promise. The principle of a bēot is to proclaim one's acceptance of a seemingly impossible challenge in order to gain tremendous glory for actually accomplishing it.

Anglo-Saxon warriors would usually deliver bēots in the mead hall the night before a military engagement or during the battle itself. For example, a typical warrior may boast that he will be the first to strike a blow in a battle, that he would claim a renowned sword from an enemy warrior as spoil of battle, that he will slay a particular beast that has been wreaking havoc on a town or village, and so on. Bēots were usually accompanied by grand stories of one's past glorious deeds. Although other cultures and times might disdain boasting as a sign of arrogance, or sinful pride, the pagan Anglo-Saxons highly regarded such behaviour as a positive sign of one's determination, bravery, and character.

Examples of the bēot can be seen throughout the epic poem Beowulf, such as when Beowulf vows to fight Grendel without using any weapons or armour.

== Etymology ==
The Old English word bēot comes from earlier bíhát meaning 'promise'. The original noun-form of bēot corresponds to the verb bi-, be-ˈhátan. A shifting of the stress from bíhát to bi-ˈhát, on analogy of the verb, gave the late Old English beˈhát, from which the Middle English word behote derives. The second element of the term is cognate with Old Norse heit, also meaning 'promise'.

== Structure of a bēot (as seen in Beowulf) ==
1. Pledge - The individual pledges to endeavour a specific challenge
2. Speculation of outcomes - The individual predicts two possible outcomes—success or failure—and elaborates the effects of either outcome.
3. Commissioning to a higher power - The individual commissions the outcome of the challenge to a higher power (e.g. God, fate).

== See also ==
- Beowulf
- Boast
- Craic
- Flyting
- Heitstrenging
- Weregild
- Wyrd
