= Helgakviða Hjörvarðssonar =

Poem in the Poetic Edda

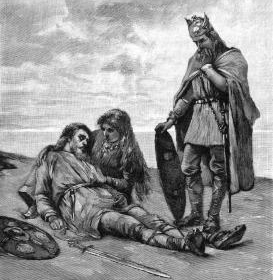
Helgi, Sváva and Heðinn. An illustration from Fredrik Sander's 1893 Swedish edition of the Poetic Edda

"Helgakviða Hjörvarðssonar" ("Lay of Helgi Hjörvarðsson") is a poem collected in the Poetic Edda, found in the Codex Regius manuscript where it follows Helgakviða Hundingsbana I and precedes Helgakviða Hundingsbana II. The portion of text which constitutes the poem is unnamed in the manuscript and may never have been intended to be viewed as a single poem, though scholars have assigned it a name for convenience. The text appears to be a patchwork of old poems, glued together with prose passages. The poem relates the story of Helgi Hjörvarðsson, loosely connected to the story of Helgi Hundingsbani.

== Storyline ==
=== How Helgi's father won Helgi's mother ===
The poem begins with a Norwegian king named Hjörvarðr. The king had four wives: Álfhildr with whom he had a son named Heðinn, a second by the name Særeiðr with whom he had the son Humlungr and a third called Sinrjóð by whom he had the son Hymlingr. The fourth wife is not mentioned, but she may be the girl Sigrlinn with whom the plot of the story begins.

Hjörvarðr had made a vow to possess the most beautiful woman he knew. When he learnt that king Sváfnir of Sváfaland had the daughter Sigrlinn who was the most beautiful girl, Hjörvarðr sent Atli, the son of his jarl Iðmundr, to woo the girl on his behalf.

Atli Iðmundsson stayed with king Sváfnir for a winter but was told by Fránmarr, the king's jarl, that the king would not give away his daughter to king Hjörvarðr. On his return home, Atli had a conversation with a bird, which told him that Hjörvarðr would have Sigrlinn on condition that the bird was given gold-horned cattle and altars from the king's estate. Atli returned home to king Hjörvarðr and told him that his mission had failed.

The king resolved to go to king Sváfnir himself together with Atli. When they came up on a mountain, they saw Sváfaland in flames and great clouds of dust rolling across the land coming from warriors on horseback. It was the army of king Hróðmarr who also desired princess Sigrlinn, but had been denied and decided to attempt to seize her by force. King Hróðmarr had just killed king Sváfnir and was searching for Sigrlinn.

During the night, king Hjörvarðr and Atli camped by a small stream, and Atli discovered a house on which was sitting a great bird. Atli did not know that the bird was a fetch, i.e., a magical double of king Sváfnir's jarl Fránmarr who was in the fetch of a bird in order to magically protect Sigrlinn and his own daughter Álof, who were both inside the house. Atli killed the bird and discovered Sigrlinn and Álof inside the house. King Hjörvarðr returned home with Sigrlinn and Atli with Álof, the daughter of the jarl he had killed.

=== Helgi meets Sváfa ===
Hjörvarðr and Sigrlinn had a son who was a silent man and to whom no name could be given. When this silent man had grown up, he was one day sitting on a hill, and he saw nine valkyries riding of whom Sváfa was the most beautiful one. She was the daughter of king Eylimi.

Sváfa called him Helgi and asked him if he wanted a gift with his newly given name (which was customary), but Helgi wanted nothing if he could not have Sváfa herself. She then informed him of the location of a great sword engraved with snakes and magic runes:

8. Sverð veit ek liggja
í Sigarsholmi
fjórum færi
en fimm tögu;
eitt er þeira
öllum betra
vígnesta böl
ok varit gulli.

9. Hringr er í hjalti,
hugr er í miðju,
ógn er í oddi
þeim er eiga getr;
liggr með eggju
ormr dreyrfáiðr,
en á valböstu
verpr naðr hala.

Translation:

8. Swords I know lying
in Sigarsholm,
Fifty there are
save only four;
One there is
that is best of all,
The shield-destroyer,
with gold it shines.

9. In the hilt is fame,
in the haft is courage,
In the point is fear,
for its owner's foes;
On the blade there lies
a blood-flecked snake,
And a serpent's tail
round the flat is twisted.

Sváfa had given Helgi his name and during his battles, she was always there for him, shielding him from danger.

=== Helgi avenges Svafnir and marries Sváfa ===
Helgi reproached his father king Hjörvarðr for not avenging the burning of Sváfaland and the killing of king Sváfnir. Moreover, king Hróðmarr still had king Svafnir's riches in his possession. Hjörvarðr gave Helgi a war band and Helgi also acquired the magic sword that Sváfa had told him about. Then Helgi killed Hróðmarr and avenged his grandfather.

In his continued adventures, Helgi killed the jötunn Hati (through this Hati does not appear to be the same as Hati Hróðvitnisson) and Helgi and Atli had a long discussion in poetry (a poem called Hrímgerðarmál) with Hati's daughter Hrímgerðr which they prolonged until the sun rose and transformed the gýgr into stone.

After having won fame in battle, Helgi went to king Eylimi and asked the king for his daughter's hand. King Eylimi consented and so Helgi and Sváfa exchanged their vows. Although, they were married, she remained with her father and Helgi was out doing battle.

=== Helgi's death ===
One Yule, Helgi's brother Heðinn found a troll-woman riding on a wolf with snakes for bridles. She asked him for his company, which he denied her. The troll woman cursed and said that he would come to regret his decision at the king's toast during the Yule festivities.

During the festivities, the men laid their hands on the sacred boar to swear their oaths and Heðinn vowed that he would have Sváfa, his brother's wife as his own.

Heðinn met Helgi and told him of his fateful vow. Helgi responded that one of his fylgjas had seen Heðin's meeting with the troll woman. He also informed Heðinn that king Hróðmar's son Álfr wanted to avenge his father and had challenged Helgi to a holmgang at Sigarsvoll which would take place three nights later.

During the holmgang with Álfr, Helgi received a mortal wound due to the troll woman's curse and Álfr won. Helgi then sent his companion Sigarr to king Eylimi in order to fetch Sváfa so that they could meet before he died.

Before dying, Helgi asked Sváfa to marry his brother Heðinn. The brother asked Sváfa to kiss him, because she would not see him again before Helgi had been avenged.

Both Helgi and Sváfa would be reborn as Helgi Hundingsbane and Sigrún and so their adventures continued.
