= Yule =

Winter festival

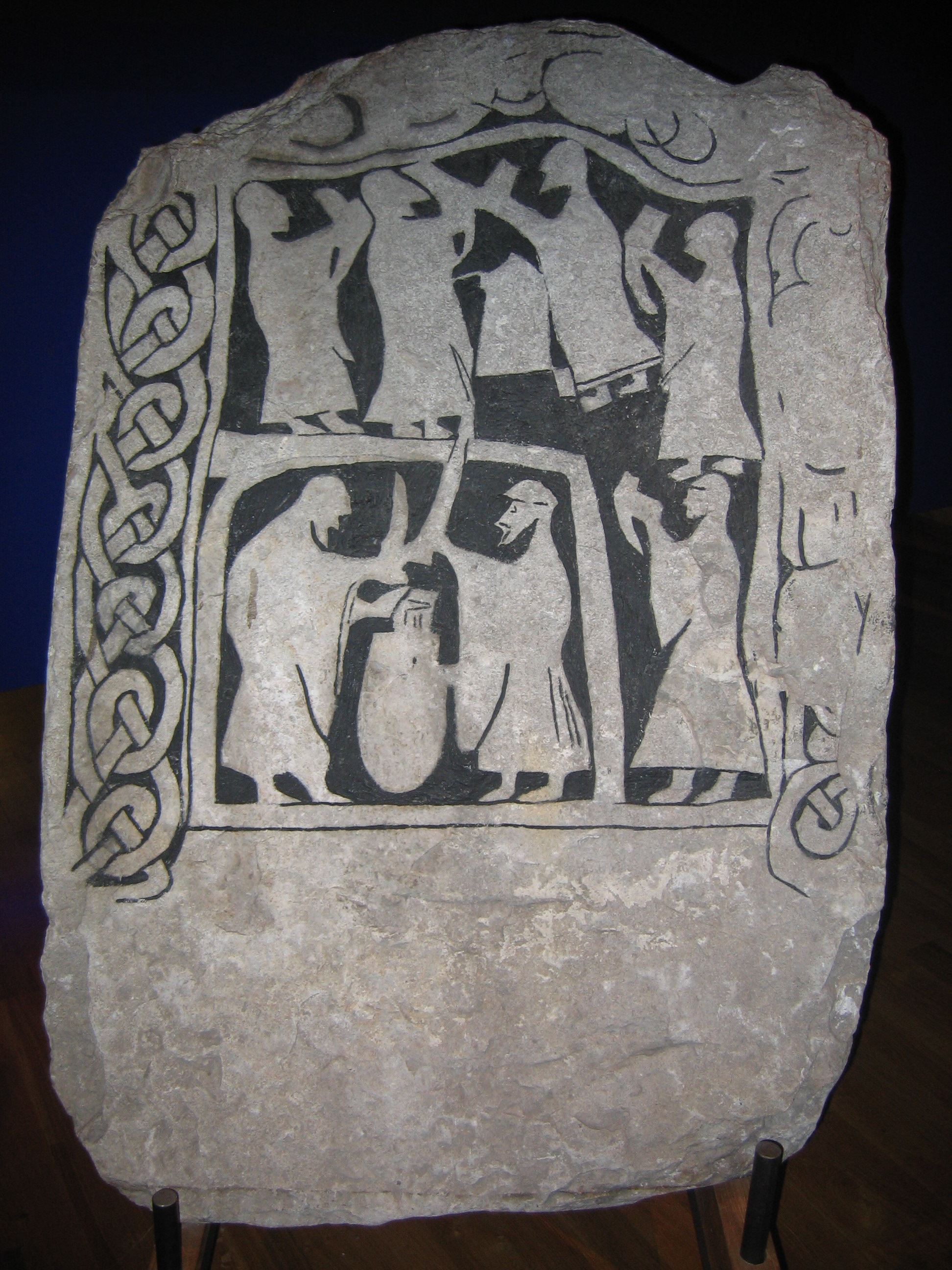
- A drinking scene on the Tängelgårda IV image stone from Gotland, in the Swedish Museum of National Antiquities in Stockholm
- Observed by: Germanic pagans, Modern pagans (Heathenry (new religious movement), Wiccans), LaVeyan Satanists
- Type: Pagan
- Significance: Winter festival
- Date: Middle of winter (see § Date of observance)
- Frequency: Annual
- Related to: Midwinter, Christmastide, Christmas

Yule (/juːl/, YOOL; Old English: ġēol, Old Norse: jól) is a winter festival and time of the year historically observed by pagan Germanic peoples that was later merged with the festival of Christmas during the process of Christianisation. The oldest accounts describe two Yule-months around the winter solstice in early, and sometimes explicitly pagan, Germanic calendars.

Later, and more extensive, Old Norse sources also describe a Yule festival occurring during this period, which possibly began on Hǫkunótt and continued for several days. During it, feasting, ceremonial drinking and oath swearing was central, and plays and games likely took place. Tales set at this time frequently feature supernatural beings visiting halls and farms, such as trolls and undead draugar. Such traditions closely resemble folk practices and beliefs from the modern period such as julebukking and the Wild Hunt, which may have partly pagan roots.

Because of the blending of the festival period and Christmas, Yule and its cognates are still used to refer to Christmas and the season of Christmastide in English and some other Northern European languages, including Swedish and Finnish. In addition to this, adherents of some new religious movements, such as Modern Germanic paganism, celebrate Yule as an independent festival to Christmas.

== Etymology and derived terms ==
The modern English noun 'Yule' descends from Middle English: ȝol (alternative forms include ȝeol and yoole), in turn from Old English: ġēol, earlier geoh(h)ol, geh(h)ol, and geóla, sometimes pluralised. The Old English term is thought to derive from a Proto-Germanic word such as *jehwlą- or *iehwulo. Other Old English forms of the word 'Yule' were iūla and giuli.

Various theories have been put forward on the meaning and origin of the Proto-Germanic root of 'Yule'. Scholars including Jacob Grimm have proposed a now widespread, but largely rejected, idea, that it is related to 'wheel', in reference to the completing of a solar cycle at the winter solstice. In support of this, it has been noted that runic calendars often represent the Christmas celebration with a wheel. It has been noted, however, that this in Old English is hweol, and there is no clear reason to connect it to geol ('Yule'). A more plausible etymology is to link it to Latin: jocus, the ancestor of English: joke. In the ancient period and Middle Ages, 'joke' referred to "entertainment" or "festivity". 'Yule' could therefore be interpreted as having originally meant a "period of joy and public celebration". Despite these efforts, the ultimate origin of *jehwlą-, and related terms, remains unclear.

'Yule' is cognate with Gothic: 𐌾𐌹𐌿𐌻𐌴𐌹𐍃 (jiuleis), Old Norse: jól, and its descendants Icelandic, Faroese and Norwegian Nynorsk jól, and Danish, Swedish, and Norwegian Bokmål jul. The Proto-Germanic root was also loaned into the Finnic languages, giving rise to Finnish: juhla. Later, a North Germanic word for Yule (such as jól) was loaned again, giving joulu. This possibly occurred through Northern Sami: juowˈlâ as an intermediate with the same Germanic root. 'Yule' and its modern cognates typically denote Christmas and the period around it, with a slight exception being Finnish: juhla, which can have that meaning but normally carries the more general sense of "celebration". It remains uncertain if there are any Indo-European cognates that are not derived from Proto-Germanic, though numerous speculative attempts have been made. It has been suggested that Old French: jolif (later, French: joli), which was borrowed into English in the 14th century as 'jolly', may itself borrowed from Old Norse: jól (with the Old French suffix -if; compare Old French aisif "easy", Modern French festif = fest "feast" + -if). But the Oxford English Dictionary sees this explanation for jolif as unlikely. The French word is first attested in the Anglo-Norman Estoire des Engleis ("History of the English People"), written by Geoffrey Gaimar between 1136 and 1140.

In addition to denoting Christmas and the period around it, 'Yule' is also used for a pagan midwinter festival celebrated by Scandinavians, and likely other Germanic peoples, before their Christianisation. In scholarly usage, the same English term is also applied as an umbrella label for pre-Christian Germanic midwinter observances, including Old Norse jól, which can denote the midwinter season itself. This association with Old Norse religion is reflected in terms derived from jól such as jólnar, used in the poetry of Eyvindr skáldaspillir to refer to the gods. The singular form Jólnir ("Yule man") is also one of the many names of Odin. While the 12th century Old Norse Ágrip describes jól as coming from Jólnir, the opposite is true. Other Old Norse terms derived from jól include jólaǫl ("Yule ale"), jólagjǫf ("Yule gift"), jólaaptann ("Yule-eve") and jóladrykkja ("Yule drinking"). Some compound nouns derived from "Yule" in English are first attested long after Christianisation, including Yuletide ("Yule-time"; c. 1475), yule-candle (1808), yule-game (1611) and yule-log (1725).

== Yule months ==
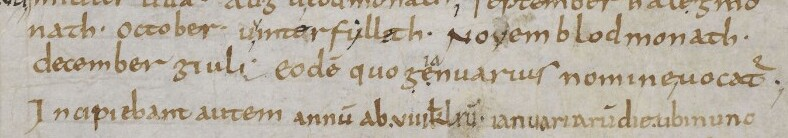
Section of De Mensibus Anglorum in The Reckoning of Time describing giuli, Cotton MS Vespasian B VI. (Note: Shown text reads: "...nath, Oktober Vuinter-fylleth, November Blod-monath, December Giuli, eodem Januarius nomine, vocatur. Incipiebant autem annum ab octavo Calendarum Januariarum die, ubi nunc..." ("...nath; October, Winterfilleth; November, Blodmonath; December, Giuli, the same name by which January is called. They began the year on the 8th kalends of January, when..."))

Yule is attested early in the history of the Germanic peoples, and over a wide geographical range; the earliest of such records is a Gothic calendar, found in the c. 350 CE Codex Ambrosianus, that mentions the month fruma jiuleis ("the month before the Yule-month"), implying a subsequent unrecorded *jiuleis ("Yule month").

Two adjacent months named after Yule are recorded by the English historian Bede in The Reckoning of Time, dated to c. 726 CE. Bede writes that before his time, the heathen Anglo-Saxons had reckoned their months based on the phases of the moon, and that they had called both December and January Giuli (the months of Yule). A 10th-century English text refers to these two months as se ǽrra Geola and se æftera Geola, "the earlier" and "the latter Yule month". Bede further writes that the heathen English started their year on 25 December, when Christians celebrate the birth of Jesus, and says that they called this Modranecht ("Mothers' night"). This day likely fell between the two months of giuli. Bede further says the night got its name from the ceremonies he believed they performed then; the mothers are typically interpreted as goddesses, possibly the dísir.

Old Norse sources also record two Yule months: Jólmánuðr ("Yule month") and Ýlir, a term with the same root that is likely pre-Christian. The Icelandic Bókarbót, usually dated to around 1220, places Ýlir from the middle of November to the middle of December in the Julian calendar, and Jólmánuðr following afterwards into the middle of January. After the official Christianisation of Scandinavia, the Church gradually introduced the Julian calendar, with it being largely established by the middle of the 1100s. Nonetheless, a lunisolar time-reckoning was practiced in Sweden as late as the early 1900s, where the Jultungel ("Yule moon") was the moon that was seen during Epiphany and the Dísting market was held on the following full moon.

Given the large geographic area over which there is evidence for moon-based calendars with two Yule months, it has been suggested that they originated substantially earlier than their first attestations, when the relevant Germanic peoples lived closer together. This may be before the migrations of the Goths from the Baltic coast, and possibly the Angles from southern Scandinavia to Britain. An early dating would further support the development of the calendar in a pagan context, before the adoption of Christianity.

== Timing of Yule celebrations ==
The exact timing of the pre-Christian Yule celebrations is unclear and debated among scholars. The earliest record of a seasonal celebration in Scandinavia is given by the 6th century historian Procopius of Caesaria who writes of the Heruli who lived in "Thule" (likely around modern day Norway). He describes how the sun is not seen there for 40 nights in winter and that their greatest festival of the year is celebrated 20 days after the winter solstice, when the sun appears again. This would be mid January in the Gregorian calendar. (Note: The translated text reads "... a very wonderful thing takes place each year. For the sun at the time of the summer solstice never sets for forty days, but appears constantly during this whole time above the earth. But no less than six months later, at about the time of the winter solstice, the sun is never seen on this island for forty days, but never-ending night envelops it; and as a result of this dejection holds the people there during this whole time, because they are unable by any means to mingle with one another during this interval... And when a time amounting to thirty-five days has passed in this long night, certain men are sent to the summits of the mountains - for this is the custom among them - and when they are able from that point barely to see the sun, they bring back word to the people below that within five days the sun will shine upon them. And the whole population celebrates a festival at the good news, and that too in the darkness. And this is the greatest festival which the natives of Thule have; for, I imagine, these islanders always become terrified, although they see the same thing happen each year, fearing that the sun may at some time fail them entirely.") Scholars since the 17th century have suggested this is describing Yule celebrations. The nature of Procopius' account, including the possibility that he is describing Sámi rather than Germanic peoples, complicates interpretations of the source.

Bede in the 8th century says that the two Anglo-Saxon Yule months (Giuli) are linked to the winter solstice. He writes that they "derive their name from the day when the Sun turns back [and begins] to increase", with one month before the solstice and one following it. In surviving Anglo-Saxon calendars, the winter solstice was generally deemed to be December 25, following the Julian calendar. According to Andreas Nordberg, an issue with this is that the Anglo-Saxons used a lunisolar calendar, which Bede describes, in which each month lasted a full waxing and waning of the moon. The two Anglo-Saxon Yule months would therefore move relative to the winter solstice and it could not always fall in the middle of them.

In Old Norse sources, the only exact timing of the Nordic Yule (Jól) is found in Hákonar saga góða. It describes how the Nordic Yule began on hǫkunótt, which is equated with miðsvetrarnótt ("Midwinter Night"), and continued for three days. Although the English midwinter referred to the time of the winter solstice the Scandinavian Midwinter Night was about one month after the winter solstice. Winter in Scandinavia is deemed to last longer than in southern Germanic regions. In Old Norse sources that divided the year into two seasons, winter was deemed to begin with the "Winter Nights" in mid-October and to end in mid-April. Hǫkunótt only occurs in this passage, and is alternatively spelt hǫggunótt in Fríssbók. The etymology of hǫkunótt is not clear but various interpretations have been put forward, including relating it to the verb hǫggva ("to hew", "to slaughter") in reference to the sacrifice of animals at the blót that took place at that time.

Scholars have argued that the Nordic Yule feast took place at the winter solstice, despite Snorri Sturluson not placing it then. Andreas Nordberg proposes, instead, that the Nordic Yule was celebrated on the full moon of the lunar month following the winter solstice (the lunar month starting on the first new moon after the solstice). This could range from 5 January at the earliest to 2 February at the latest in the Gregorian calendar. Nordberg places the Nordic Midwinter Nights on 19 to 21 January in the Gregorian calendar, falling roughly in the middle of his range of Yule dates. In addition to Snorri's account, Nordberg's dating is consistent with the account of the great blót at Lejre by Thietmar of Merseburg. This interpretation has received scholarly support.

== Historical Nordic traditions ==
=== Blót, feasting and drinking ===
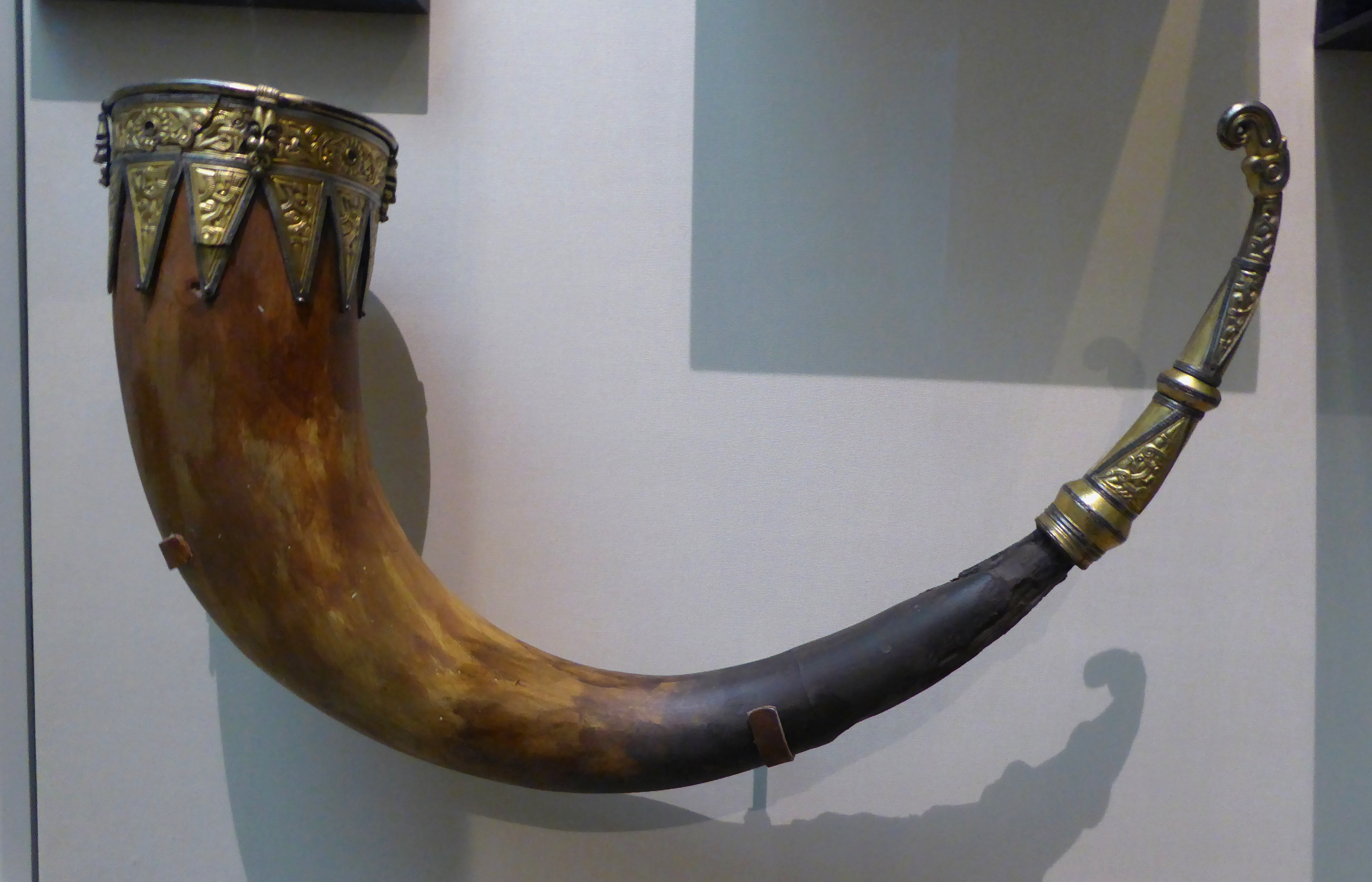
Reconstruction of a Taplow drinking horn, British Museum.

In medieval Scandinavia, blót often took place during Yule celebrations, whereby animals were sacrificed to the gods and their meat cooked and shared among those present. This was typically accompanied by ceremonial drinking of ale or mead.

Communal eating was central to Yule, which is seen in the use of jól in skaldic poetry to mean 'feast' in the kenning for 'battle': hugins jól ('a raven's (Yule) feast'). (Note: This kenning is used in Grani skald's praise of Haraldr Sigurðarson, quoted in the Morkinskinna and Hulda-Hrokkinskinna versions of Skáldskaparmál. An alternative translation of the phrase containing hugins jól is "I believe the ruler prepared a yule-feast for the retinue of Huginn [raven]", which carries the same overall meaning.) Jólaveizlur ("Yule-feasts") are also widely attested in medieval Old Norse accounts of pre-Christian celebrations, including the Yule-feast of King Halfdanr svarti in his eponymous saga, where all the food and ale was made to disappear by a Sámi man. Another notable example is in Hákonar saga góða, where Hákon the Good is forced to take part in blót-feasts in Mære and Lade, including eating meat from the sacrificed horses, as part of his responsibilities as a king. Yule has further been identified by some scholars with the álfablót ("elf-blót") recorded in Ólafs saga helga, though this has been rejected by others as álfablót were likely held in autumn, not winter.

Drinking ceremonies also likely took place at Yule, consistent with their prominence in Germanic paganism more widely. (Note: The evidence for the connection between ceremonial drinking and pre-Christian Germanic culture at times other than Yule is extensive, as seen in depictions in Beowulf, the invitation of Hákon the Good to drink with the gods in Hákonarmál, and a lausavisa composed by Egils saga that scorns the lack of beer at a dísablót.) Early evidence of this is found in Þorbjǫrn hornklofi's Haraldskvæði, written around 900 CE, where Harald Fairhair "drinks Yule", or "drinks to Yule":

Old Norse text	Translation
Uti vill jól drekka, ef skal einn ráða fylkir enn framlyndi, ok Freys leik heyja; ungr leiddisk eldvelli ok inni (at) sitja, varma dyngu eða vöttu dúns fulla	He wants to drink (to?) Yule outside if he can decide alone, the fame-seeking ruler and perform Frey’s leikr; the young man was tired of the fireside and sitting indoors in the warm women’s room or down-filled cushions

Here, "drinking Yule" seems to be synonymous with celebrating it. At the feast in Mære, King Hákon also drinks toasts that were poured for him, consistent with the importance of ritual drinking at Yule.

The importance of drinking at Yule is likely reflected in surviving customs after Christianisation. Den ældre Gulathings-Lov, an early law code from Norway, imposes punishments for incorrect preparation of ale for jól ('Yule' or 'Christmas'). The required practices include brewing in groups, unless one lives very remotely, and hallowing the ale to thank Christ and St Mary til árs. oc til friðar ("for prosperity and peace") - a ritual formula that likely originated in heathen contexts. This has been interpreted as an example of missionaries Christianising a pagan custom by replacing "heathen gods" with Christian figures. Furthermore, Hákonar saga góða says that in King Hákon's effort to Christianise Norway, he shifted Yule to Christmas time. He also imposed a fine on anyone who did not have a measure of ale at Yule (estimated to be around 16.2 litres), and made it law for the holiday to continue as long as the ale lasted.

=== Heitstrenging ===
The swearing of solemn vows, Heitstrenging, on Yule-Eve are attested in Helgakviða Hjörvarðssonar and Hervarar saga ok Heiðreks, the first of which reads:

Old Norse text

Heðinn fór einn saman heim ór skógi jólaaftan ok fann trollkonu. Sú reið vargi ok hafði orma at taumum ok bauð fylgð sína Heðni. "Nei," sagði hann. Hon sagði: "Þess skaltu gjalda at bragarfulli." Um kveldit óru heitstrengingar. Var fram leiddr sónargöltr. Lögðu menn þar á hendr sínar ok strengðu menn þá heit at bragarfulli.

Bellows translation

Hethin was coming home alone from the forest one Yule-eve, and found a troll-woman; she rode on a wolf, and had snakes in place of a bridle. She asked Hethin for his company. "Nay," said he. She said, "Thou shalt pay for this at the king's toast." That evening the great vows (heitstrengingar) were taken; the sacred boar (sonargöltr) was brought in, the men laid their hands thereon, and took their vows at the king's toast (bragafull).

Hervarar saga ok Heiðreks similarly takes place on Yule-Eve and describes people placing their hands on a pig referred to as a sonargöltr before swearing solemn oaths at the bragafull ('toast', 'libation'). Some manuscripts of the text explicitly refer to the pig as holy, that it was devoted to Freyr and that after the oath-swearing it was sacrificed at a blót.

=== Games and performances ===
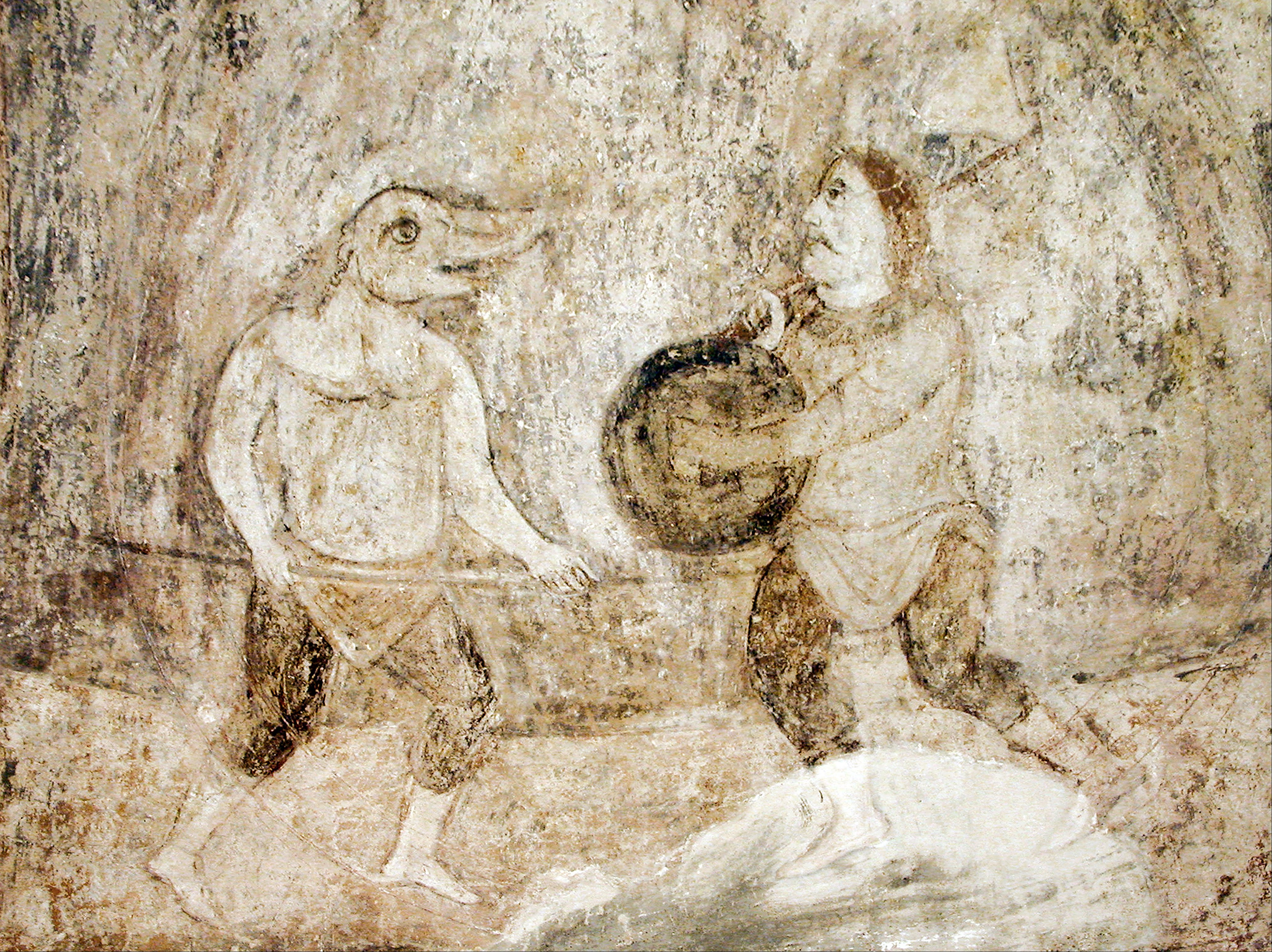
Fresco of two warriors, one of which with the head of a dog, on the ceiling of St. Sophia Cathedral in Kyiv.

Games during Yule are widely attested in the Old Norse record, including glíma in Króka-Refs saga, knattleikr in Hálfdanar saga Eysteinssonar and tug-of-war in Hjálmþés saga ok Ölvis. Performances and plays, possibly such as those depicted on the Sutton Hoo helmet, may also have been connected to the pre-Christian festival.

The earlier discussed stanza from Haraldskvæði uses the term "Frey’s leikr", which may be a Yuletide ritual dedicated to the god. Leikr, and the verb leika, typically refer to an activity such as a "game", "dramatic performance" or "dance" . The phrase is, however, also used in the later Ragnars saga loðbrókar as a kenning for battle and this may be the meaning intended in Haraldskvæði. This interpretation has alternatively been suggested to be a misunderstanding of the earlier meaning. Furthermore, leikr is cognate with Old English: lāc, which has diverse meanings from 'play', 'sacrifice', 'gift' and 'battle'.

A further possible attestation is the gothikon, a performance described in the 10th century Byzantine Book of ceremonies as taking place on Twelfth Night. The performance consisted of two groups of men, each performing a circle dance, one circle inside the other, while accompanied by two pairs of men wearing masks and skins. Throughout the dance, the performers hit their shields with sticks, while shouting "Toúl" ("τούλ"). This word's meaning is debated but is widely identified as a misspelling or misunderstanding of jól ("Yule"), and the performance as part of a Yule tradition. While the text identifies the dancers as Goths, these are not elsewhere attested in Constantinople after around 500. It is possible they were instead Scandinavians, possibly from Gotland or Götaland, who are widely attested as Varangians. (Note: The identification of the dancers with Varangians is supported by De officiis, written in the mid 1300s by Georgios Kodinos as an expansion and accompaniment to the Book of ceremonies. It records how at the emperor's Christmas feast, Varangians would wish him well in their native tongue (English) and make noise by hitting their axes together.) This description has been noted for its similarity to a fresco of two fighting warriors on the ceiling of St Sophia Cathedral in Kyiv. One has a round shield and an Dane axe, likely intended of a visual marker of their identity as a Varangian and a Scandinavian elite. The other fighter has the head of a dog, possibly a mask like in the Book of ceremonies, that may derive from pagan religious dramas connected to berserkir. Notably, two felt animal masks dating to the 10th century have been discovered in Hedeby.

=== Supernatural visitations ===
Yule visits from supernatural beings, such as berserkir, trolls and undead draugar, are widely attested across Northern Europe in modern folklore. Given their early attestations, without clear Christian underpinnings, it has been proposed such ideas were present before Christianisation. An early account of these visits is in Eyrbyggja saga, in which the farm on Breiðafjörður in Iceland is taken over by ghosts of those who have died both at land and sea. This motif is also seen with the arrival of the half-etayn Green Knight in the c. 14th century Sir Gawain and the Green Knight and in later tales, such as the balads of Åsmund Frægdegjeva and Steinfinn Fefinnson.

Often the visits result in conflict, as in Grettis saga, in which Grettir beheads the undead shepherd Glamur, who had been haunting the area at Yule. Another Yule, a troll-woman who was attacking a hall is driven back to her waterfall home by Grettir, who then kills her. This section of the saga closely resembles tales such as the Old English poem Beowulf and is likely part of a shared tradition. Strong similarities are also seen between these tales and folktales recorded in the 18th century in Iceland, such as Sagan af Grimi Skeljungsbana. Changes are seen over time, however, with an overall shift from the hero defeating the visitor with his own strength, to relying on external factors like calling on Jesus or the light of dawn. Furthermore, there is a general increase in the number of invading beings and in Iceland, they are huldufólk or elves, rather than the older trolls and ghosts.

==== The Wild Host ====
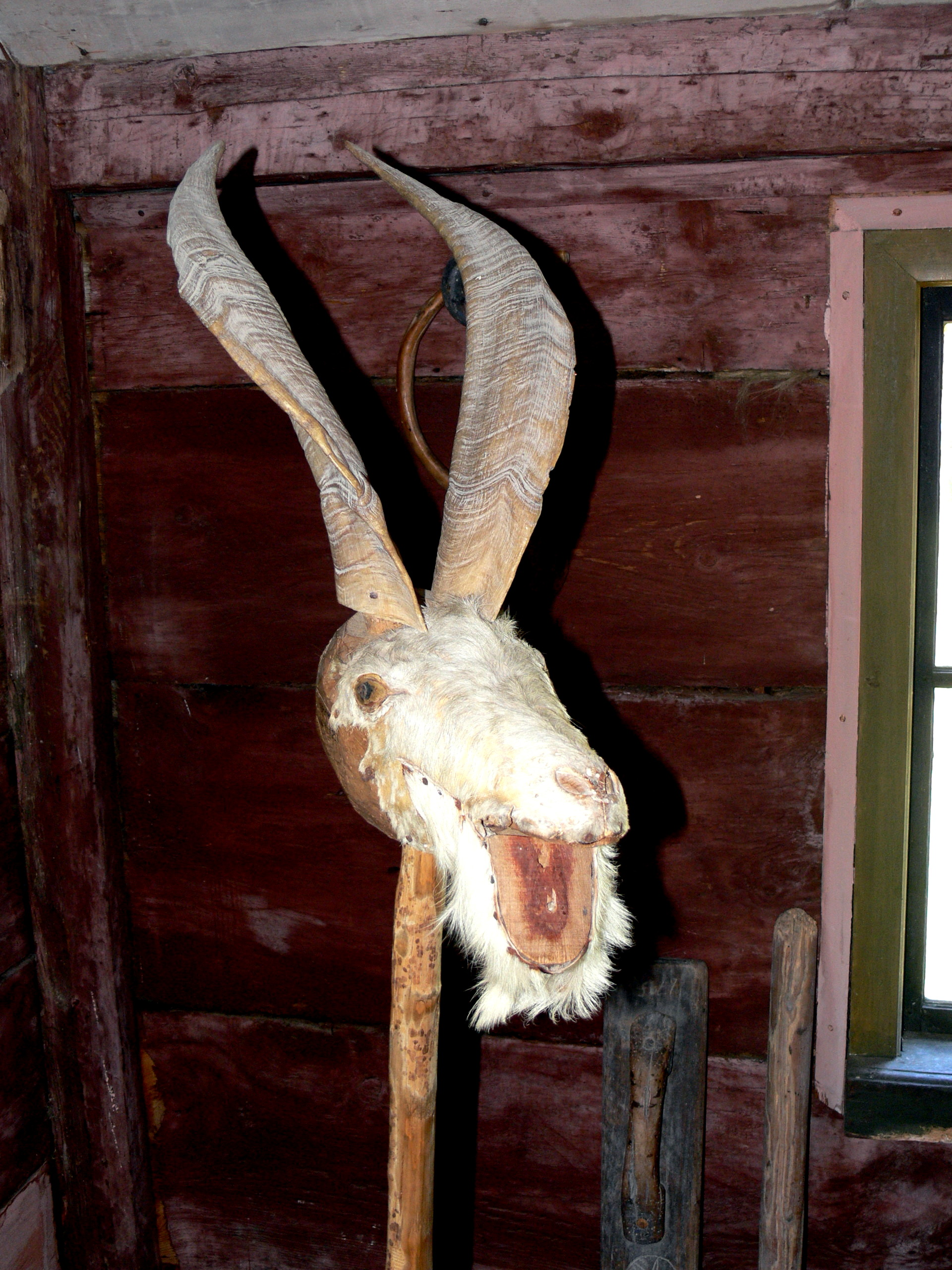
Julbock costume, Bungemuseet, Gotland.

A specific type of supernatural visitations that have been connected to the heathen Yule and the winter solstice is the Wild Host (or Wild Hunt). This is a constructed academic category for a diverse collection of traditions found throughout North-Western Europe for groups of supernatural beings travelling across the landscape, often in winter or around Christmas. Names for these customs vary greatly between regions, including the Norwegian Oskoreia, Juleskreia ("the yule host"), Julereia ("The yule/Christmas ride") and Julesveinane ("the Yule lads"). Traits of the variants are largely independent of the name of the host or its leader. The beings of the host are often noisy and harmful dead, but may also include goats (in particular Julebukkane ("the Yule billy-goats"). According to folktales, as they travel through the land, they invade farms in their way, stealing Christmas food, Christmas ale, and sometimes even people or horses. Taken horses are almost ridden to death while people may be thrown down after a time, either where they were abducted or far away. In the 20th century, tar crosses were painted on farmhouse doors in Western Norway for protection against them.

The host is variously led by a diverse range of figures, for example the figures from Germanic heroic legend, Sigurd Svein and Guro Rysserova. In several regions of northern Europe, Odin leads the hunt (or the similar Wodenjäger or Odinjœgeren). Old Norse sources also describe Odin and his group in a way that closely resembles almost all aspects of Wild Host traditions, such as his leading of a host of the dead einherjar, along with valkyrjur, who collect the newly dead. Odin is recorded as stealing Yule food in Flateyjarbók's Haralds þáttr hárfagra, similar to in later accounts of the host. Furthermore, he is often equated in historical sources with Mercury, a Roman god who has a role in guiding the dead to the afterlife. Odin's role as leader of the Wild Host may be the origin of his name, which literally means "lord of frenzy" or "leader of the possessed". Similar to Norwegian traditions of leaving out food and drink for the Wild Host, in Southern Scandinavia, the last sheaf cut in harvest or grass during haying would be left for Odin's horse or horses around Christmas.

==== Guising ====
The supernatural host cannot be separated neatly from the interlinked tradition of hosts of costumed humans travelling the countryside around Yule or Christmas and performing similar acts recorded in the modern period. The ambiguity between the two groups is seen for example in how the supernatural host is sometimes flying in the sky but could also walk along roads as the guised humans would. The costumed figures could also be the same as those in the supernatural host, for example the julebukk ("Yule-goat"), in which the top half of the guiser was dressed as a goat. Other figures include the halmgubbar ("strawmen"), who were wrapped in straw or corn. Similar to the supernatural host, they often travelled between buildings, variously grunting like animals, singing, dancing and being given food and drink. Guisers sometimes would jokingly whip with brushwood those who refused to give them what they demanded. Sometimes these offerings were nearly compulsory, with the visitors not leaving until a "tax" had been paid. The figures could also have sexual facets, sometimes having penises as part of the costume and kissing young men and women. In one account from Trøndelag, the julbukker became so angry they butted people with their horns and it was said the first person each one butted was to become their wife. These traditions resembles those of the Sámi Stallo, an ugly costumed figure who would poke girls with a stick (sometimes shaped like a penis) until he was paid to leave.

The origins of such practices are debated. Some visitations have clear Christian imagery, such as the Stjärnspel in which the figures are the Three Kings bearing a star, while others lack obvious Christian or foreign influence. The traditions also developed over time, and between regions, with figures such as the julbukk never being homogenous throughout Scandinavia. An early attestation of a practice resembling late guising traditions is given in Þorleifs þáttur jarlsskálds, found in the late 14th century Flateyjarbók manuscript. It tells how one Yule in old pagan times, the skald Þorleifur visits the Norwegian ruler Hákon Jarl at a feast to get revenge on him for a previous insult. To avoid being recognised, he goes disguised as a food beggar, wearing a goat beard, placing a leather bag behind it, and using crutches such that he walked on all four legs. When the jarl invites him to eat, he secretly puts the food into the leather bag rather than his mouth, before saying a ritual curse to Hákon which makes him lose hair from his head. Though the disguise traditions are typically attested late, they do closely resemble visitations by figures such as Grýla, groleks and skeklers that may in turn have roots in old pagan ritual dramas and are found across a large geographical area, including Shetland, Iceland and Sweden. Similar to the julebukk, people dressed as these figures sometimes spoke in reverse speech, in which sound is made while breathing in, and could have a wooden penis as part of the costume. Notably, Grýla is attested in 13th-century sources such as the Prose Edda's þulr of troll-women, Íslendinga saga and Sverris saga. Comparisons have also been drawn between these customs, particularly those of straw figures, and Freyr, who in Gunnars þáttr helmings travels around Sweden in winter between farms, partaking in feasts and ensuring good harvests.

== Academic reception ==
=== Significance and connection to other events ===
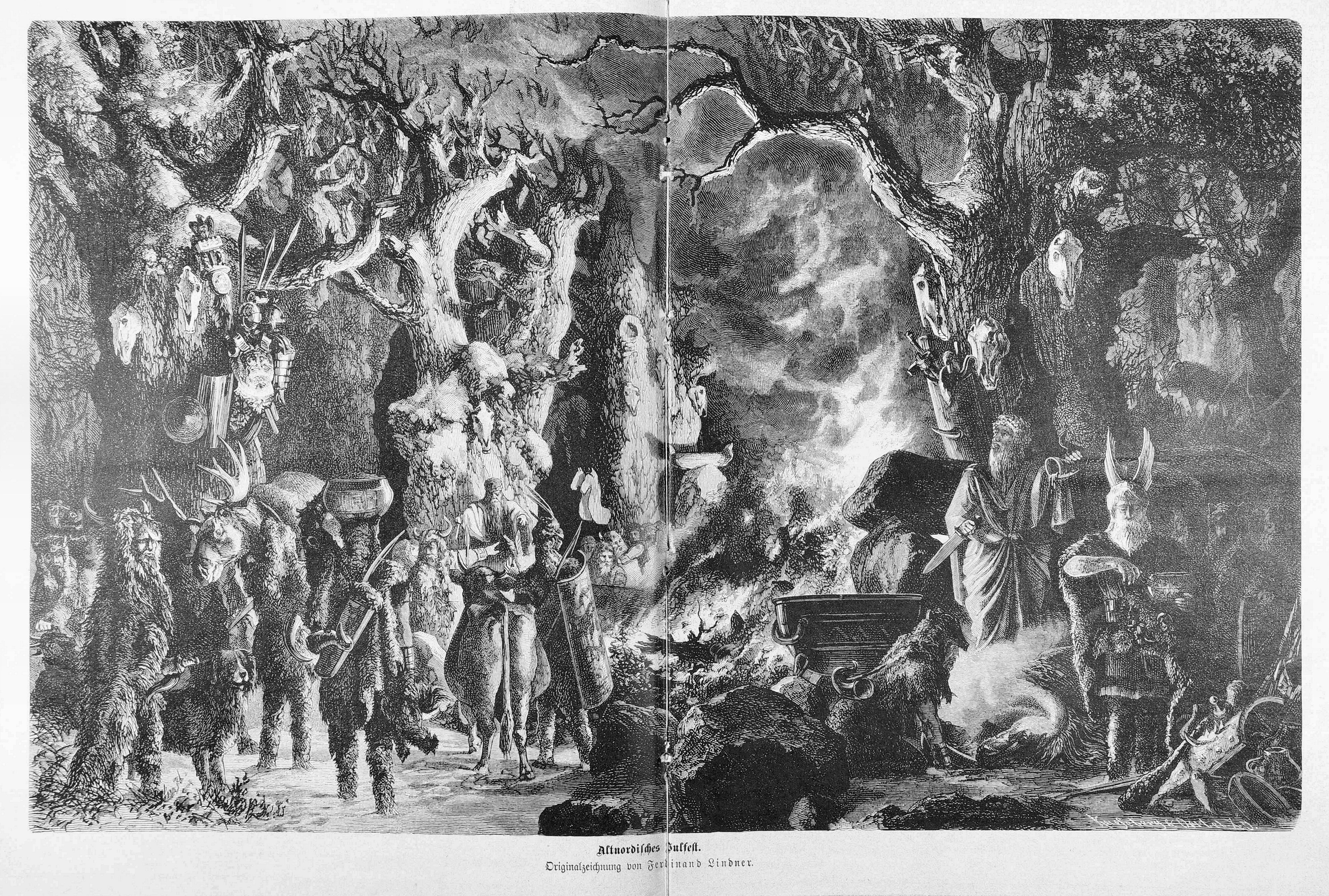
Illustration of an ancient Nordic Yule festival (Die Gartenlaube, 1880)

As early as the 1600s, researchers identified Yule as a solstice festival, possibly being a feast for the newborn sun. By the 1890s, this had become generally accepted among scholars. This theory became challenged later on, particularly through the belief that the pre-Christian Germanic peoples were not culturally sophisticated enough to know about solstices. Part of the reasoning for this is that 'solstice' is a Latin word. Germanic terms seemingly independent of Latin do seem to exist, however, including sólhverf ("sun-turning") and solhof ("sun-heightening"), and it is now widely accepted that solstices were known about by these peoples before Christianisation. However, the evidence has been interpreted as indicating variation by region and period, rather than a single uniform heathen midwinter festival fixed exclusively to the solstice date. More recently, Yule has been variously argued by scholars to be part of the cult of the dead, a fertility festival and a new year festival. Interpretations typically draw attention to the liminality of the time, including the threat from supernatural forces, and the prominent darkness in the middle of winter. In Scandinavian contexts, midwinter observance is described as being shaped by environmental constraints and risk management, including reliance on stored provisions, restricted mobility, and vulnerability of livestock and households. Scholarly discussion has also emphasised the role of midwinter customs in reinforcing household order and social cohesion during prolonged indoor confinement.

The Yule log, Yule boar, Yule singing, and other late customs may have connections to pre-Christian Yule traditions and have been proposed by Simek to indicate the importance of the festival before Christianisation.

=== Existence of pre-Christian Yule ===
British historian Ronald Hutton wrote of the term "Yule" that there is "doubt over whether it was originally attached to a midwinter festival which preceded the Christian one [of Christmas]". It is suggested that the Vikings who settled in England introduced or popularised 'Yule' as a name for Christmas among the Anglo-Saxons. The Gothic form of 'Yule' is, however, attested in a calendar from c. 350 CE, while Bede writes it in its Old English form in The Reckoning of Time, written in the 8th century. Hutton further writes that the earliest Scandinavian literature, before Snorri, makes no reference to Yule as a pagan feast. The typical view in scholarship is that Yule was indeed a "heathen" winter feast in North Germanic communities that was later applied to Christmas as Christianity became established. Yule feasts feature extensively in Old Norse texts such as Heimskringla, written in the early 13th century and based on earlier sources. These include Haraldskvæði, composed around 900 CE in praise of a "heathen" king who "drinks Yule".

It has further been stressed that, even disregarding all speculation about the nature of pre-Christian Yule celebrations, it is very unlikely that Germanic peoples did not have seasonal or midwinter festivals when Christian missionaries arrived.

== Contemporary traditions ==
=== Relationship with Christmas in Northern Europe ===
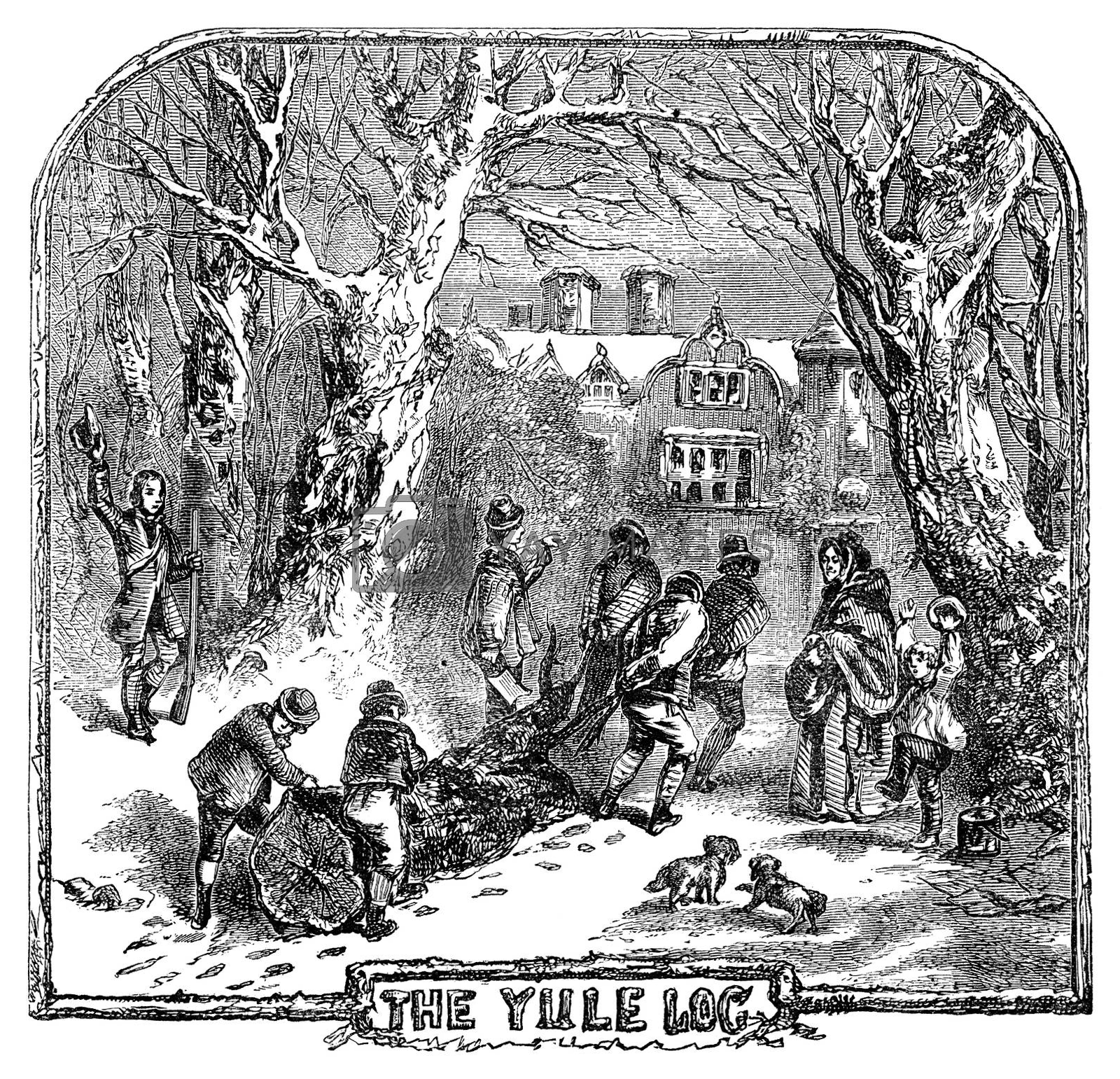
Hauling a Yule log in 1832.

As Christianity became established among Germanic peoples, Yule slowly merged with the Christian festival of Christmas. Ágrip, for example, tells that Ólaf Tryggvason Christianised Norway, Iceland, Shetland, Orkney and the Faroes in the late 10th century. In the account, he banned blót and blót-drinking, replacing these with holiday feasts at Yule, Easter and ale at St John's Mass and Michaelmas. Similarly, Hákon the Good, according to Hákonar saga góða, passed a law in Norway to make Yule celebrations take place at the same time as the Christians celebrated Christmas. These actions have been compared to Pope Gregory's recommendation in 601 to Augustine to convert the heathen English by renaming existing traditional practices and taking over holy sites rather than trying to eradicate them. In England, Yule was used to refer to Christmas by the second half of the 9th century, where it is attested in the Doom book of Alfred the Great (c. 890) as gehhol, and the Old English Martyrology (c. 800-900) as geolum. Some later Old English texts call Christmas Day Geohel-dæg (Yule Day).

Today, variants of "Yule" are the main names for Christmas in the North Germanic languages as well as in the Finnic languages. "Yule" and "Yuletide" are alternative names for Christmas and Christmastide in English. Traditionally, Yule or Yuil is also the main name for Christmas in Scots.

=== Modern paganism ===
As contemporary pagan religions differ in both origin and practice, these representations of Yule can vary considerably despite the shared name. Some Heathens, for example, celebrate in a way as close as possible to how they believe ancient Germanic pagans observed the tradition, while others observe the holiday with rituals "assembled from different sources".

In most forms of Wicca, this holiday is celebrated at the winter solstice as the rebirth of the Great horned hunter god, who is viewed as the newborn solstice sun. The method of gathering for this sabbat varies by practitioner. Some have private ceremonies at home, while others do so with their covens:

Generally meeting in covens, which anoint their own priests and priestesses, Wiccans chant and cast or draw circles to invoke their deities, mainly during festivals like Samhain and Yule, which coincide with Halloween and Christmas, and when the moon is full.

== See also ==
- Dísablót, an event attested from Old Norse sources as having occurred among the pagan Norse
- Julebord, the modern Scandinavian Christmas feast
- Koliada, a Slavic winter festival
- Lohri, a Punjabi winter solstice festival
- Saturnalia, an ancient Roman winter festival in honour of the deity Saturn
- Yaldā Night, an Iranian festival celebrated on the "longest and darkest night of the year".
- Nardoqan, the birth of the sun, is an ancient Turkic festival that celebrates the winter solstice.

== Bibliography ==
=== Primary ===
- Beda (1999). Bede, The Reckoning of Time. Translated by Wallis, Faith. Liverpool University Press. ISBN 978-0-85323-693-1.
- Snorri Sturluson. Heimskringla, volume 1 (PDF). Translated by Finlay, Alison; Faulkes, Anthony. Viking Society for Northern Research. ISBN 9780903521864.
- Porphyrogennetos, Konstantin (2009). Sandin, Pär Ola; Reiske, Johann Jacob; Nilsson, Martin P:son (eds.). "Gotisk affaradag jul vid det bysantinska hovet: Ur Konstantin Porphyogennetos De ceremoniis, med anmärkningar av Nils Sjöberg, Johann Jakob Reiske, Martin P:n Nilsson och Pär Sandin". KultOrg: Samskandinavisk Tidskrift (9): 123–134. ISSN 1890-7350. Archived from the original on 15 October 2021.
- Viga-Glums saga, with the tales of Ögmund Bash and Thorvald Chatterbox. Translated by McKinnell, John. Edinburgh: Canongate/UNESCO. 1987. ISBN 0862410843.
- Bellows, Henry Adam (1936). The Poetic Edda.
- Cumpstey, Ian (2016). The Faraway North: Scandinavian Folk Ballads. Northern Displayers, Skadi Press. ISBN 978-0957612020.
- Driscoll, Matthew (1 January 1995). Ágrip af Nóregskonungasögum: A twelfth-century synoptic history of the kings of Norway. Viking Society for Northern Research. ISBN 978-0-903521-27-7.
- Fulk, R. D. (2012). Poetry from the Kings' Sagas 1: From Mythical Times to c. 1035. Skaldic Poetry of the Scandinavian Middle Ages 1. Turnhout: Brepols. ISBN 978-2-503-51896-1.
- Gade, Kari Ellen (2009). "Grani skáld, Poem about Haraldr harðráði 2". Skaldic Poetry of the Scandinavian Middle Ages.
- "Haralds þáttr hárfagra – heimskringla.no". heimskringla.no.
- "Helgakviða Hjörvarðssonar – heimskringla.no". heimskringla.no.
- Grettir's Saga. Translated by Morris, William; Eirikr Magnusson. 1900.
- "Saga Hákonar góða – heimskringla.no". heimskringla.no.
- Rauer, Christine, ed. (2013). The Old English Martyrology: Edition, Translation and Commentary. Vol. 10. Boydell & Brewer. ISBN 978-1-84384-347-4. JSTOR 10.7722/j.ctt31njnj.

=== Secondary ===
- Axton, Richard (1974). European drama of the early Middle Ages. London: Hutchinson. ISBN 978-0-09-119250-1.
- Bandlien, Bjørn (2022). "When Worldviews Collide? : The Travel Narratives of Haraldr Sigurðarson of Norway". In Raffensperger, Christian (ed.). Authorship, Worldview and Identity in Medieval Europe. Routledge. pp. 161–172. doi:10.4324/9781003025160. ISBN 9780367457662.
- Barnhart, Robert K. (1995). The Barnhart Concise Dictionary of Etymology. HarperCollins. ISBN 0062700847.
- Bosworth, Joseph; Toller, T. Northcote (1898). An Anglo-Saxon Dictionary. Oxford: Oxford University Press.
- Buescher, James (15 December 2007). "Wiccans, pagans ready to celebrate Yule". Lancaster Online. Archived from the original on 29 December 2007.
- Celander, Hilding (1955). Förkristen jul enligt norröna källor (PDF). Stockholm: Almqvist & Wiksell.
- Escobedo, Tricia (11 December 2015). "5 things you didn't know about Satanists". CNN. Archived from the original on 7 March 2019. "So for the Yule holiday season we enjoy the richness of life and the company of people whom we cherish, as we will often be the only ones who know where the traditions really came from!"
- Geeraert, Dustin (2018). ""Etaynez þat Hym Anelede of þe Heӡe Felle": Ghosts of Giants in Sir Gawain and the Green Knight". Comitatus: A Journal of Medieval and Renaissance Studies. 49 (1): 71–101. doi:10.1353/cjm.2018.0003.
- Gunnell, Terry (1995). The Origins of Drama in Scandinavia. Boydell & Brewer Ltd. ISBN 978-0-85991-458-1.
- Gunnell, Terry (2000). "The season of the dísir: the winter nights, and the dísablót in early medieval Scandinavian belief". Cosmos. 16: 117–149.
- Gunnell, Terry (2001). "Grøleks" and Skeklers: Medieval Disguise Traditions in the North Atlantic". Nordic Yearbook of Folklore. 57: 33–54.
- Gunnell, Terry (2004). "The Coming of the Christmas Visitors Folk legends concerning the attacks on Icelandic farmhouses made by spirits at Christmas". Northern Studies. The Journal of the Scottish Society for Northern Studies. 38: 51–75.
- Gunnell, Terry (2007). Masks and mumming in the Nordic area. Uppsala: Kungl. Gustav Adolfs Akademien för svensk folkkultur. ISBN 9789185352708.
- Heide, Eldar (2019). "The Wild Host and the Etymology of Sami Stállu and Norwegian Ståle(sferda). Reflecting Ancient Contact" (PDF). Arv. Nordic Yearbook of Folklore: 73–93.
- Heide, Eldar (1 December 2024). "Týr and Viðarr : Equinox, Wolves and Old Norse Celestial Traditions". Arv. 80. doi:10.61897/arv.v80i.44671. ISSN 2002-4185.
- Hoad, T. F. (1993). English Etymology. Oxford: Oxford University Press. ISBN 0-19-283098-8.
- Hoad, T. F. (1996). The Concise Oxford Dictionary of English Etymology. Oxford: Oxford University Press. ISBN 0-19-283098-8.
- Hollander, Lee M., ed. (2007). Heimskringla: History of the Kings of Norway. Translated by Lee M. Hollander. Austin: University of Texas Press. ISBN 978-0-292-73061-8.
- Hutton, Ronald (1996). The Stations of the Sun: A History of the Ritual Year in Britain. Oxford University Press. p. 6. ISBN 978-0-19-820570-8.
- Hutton, Ronald (December 2008). "Modern Pagan Festivals: A Study in the Nature of Tradition". Folklore. 119 (3). Taylor & Francis: 251–273. doi:10.1080/00155870802352178. JSTOR 40646468. S2CID 145003549.
- Kannapell, Andrea (21 December 1997). "Celebrations; It's Solstice, Hanukkah, Kwannza: Let There Be Light!". The New York Times. Archived from the original on 31 July 2009.
- Kovářová, Lenka (2011). The Swine in Old Nordic Religion and Worldview. S2CID 154250096.
- La Ferla, Ruth (13 December 2000). "Like Magic, Witchcraft Charms Teenagers". The New York Times. Archived from the original on 28 December 2007.
- Liberman, Anatoly (24 December 2008). "Jolly Yule". OUPblog.
- Lindow, John (2001). Norse Mythology: A Guide to Gods, Heroes, Rituals, and Beliefs. Oxford University Press. ISBN 978-0-19-983969-8.
- Magnell, Ola (2019). "Animals of Sacrifice: Animals and the Blót in the Old Norse Sources and Ritual Depositions of Animals of Sacrifice". In Wikström af Edholm, Klas; Rova, Peter Jackson; Nordberg, Andreas; Sundqvist, Olof; Zachrisson, Torun (eds.). Myth, Materiality and Lived Religion. Stockholm University Press. p. 303. doi:10.16993/bay. ISBN 978-91-7635-097-3. S2CID 195459479.
- Niles, John D. (2 May 2013). "Pagan survivals and popular belief". The Cambridge Companion to Old English Literature. Cambridge University Press. ISBN 978-1-107-46921-1.
- Nordberg, Andreas (2006). "Jul, disting och förkyrklig tideräkning". Acta Academiae Regiae Gustavi Adolphi. 91. Archived from the original on 14 March 2023.
- Orchard, Andy (1997). Dictionary of Norse Myth and Legend. Cassell. ISBN 0-304-34520-2.
- Orel, Vladimir (2003). A Handbook of Germanic Etymology. Leiden: Brill Publishers. p. 205. ISBN 90-04-12875-1.
- Page, Nick (29 October 2020). Christmas: Tradition, Truth and Total Baubles. John Murray Press. ISBN 978-1-5293-3409-8.
- Preston, Todd (2014). King Alfred's Book of Laws: A Study of the Domboc and Its Influence on English Identity, with a Complete Translation. McFarland.
- Rey, Alain (2012). Dictionnaire historique de la langue française. Paris: Le Robert.
- Simek, Rudolf (2007). Dictionary of Northern Mythology. Translated by Angela Hall. D. S. Brewer. ISBN 978-0-85991-513-7.
- Steinbock, Fritz (2014). Das Heilige Fest: Rituale des traditionellen germanischen Heidentums in heutiger Zeit (in German). Edition Roter Drache. p. 134. ISBN 978-3-944180-52-6.
- Sommer, Bettina (1 January 2018). "The Pre-Christian Jól: Not a Cult of the Dead, but the Norse New Year Festival". Supernatural Encounters in Old Norse Literature and Tradition. Brepols Online. pp. 31–58. doi:10.1484/M.BBL-EB.5.116079. ISBN 978-2-503-57531-5.
- Sundqvist, Olof (27 November 2015). "An Arena for Higher Powers: Ceremonial Buildings and Religious Strategies for Rulership in Late Iron Age Scandinavia". An Arena for Higher Powers. Brill. ISBN 978-90-04-30748-3.
- Vigfússon, Guðbrandur (1874). An Icelandic-English Dictionary: Based on the Ms. Collections of the Late Richard Cleasby. Clarendon Press. OCLC 1077900672.
- Weaver, Hannah (2024). "The Character of Time in Sir Gawain and the Green Knight". ELH. 91 (2): 285–314. doi:10.1353/elh.2024.a929150. ISSN 1080-6547.
- West, Martin L. (2007). Indo-European Poetry and Myth. Oxford University Press. ISBN 978-0-19-928075-9.
- OED Online (December 2022). "yule, n.". Oxford English Dictionary. Oxford University Press. Archived from the original on 27 December 2022.
- "Old Icelandic Dictionary - Bragarfull". Old Icelandic Dictionary.
- "Old Icelandic Dictionary - Jól". Old Icelandic Dictionary.
- "Old Icelandic Dictionary - Jólaveizla". Old Icelandic Dictionary.
- "Old Norse Dictionary - Jólaaptann". Cleasby & Vigfusson - Old Norse Dictionary.
- "Old Norse Dictionary - Jóladrykkja". Cleasby & Vigfusson - Old Norse Dictionary.
- "Old Norse Dictionary - Jóla-gjöf". Cleasby & Vigfusson - Old Norse Dictionary.
- "Old Norse Dictionary - Jólaöl". Cleasby & Vigfusson - Old Norse Dictionary.
- "Old Norse Dictionary - Höku-nótt". Cleasby & Vigfusson - Old Norse Dictionary.
- "jol". Bokmålsordboka | Nynorskordboka. Archived from the original on 12 March 2017.
- "JOLI : Etymologie de JOLI". www.cnrtl.fr. Archived from the original on 24 August 2022.
- "jolly".
- "jul | SO | svenska.se". Svenska Akademiens Ordböcker (in Swedish).
- "juhla - Suomen etymologinen sanakirja". Suomen etymologinen sanakirja (in Finnish).
- "joulu - Suomen etymologinen sanakirja". Suomen etymologinen sanakirja (in Finnish).
- Turville-Petre, E. O. G. (1964). Myth and Religion of the North: The Religion of Ancient Scandinavia. London: Weidenfeld & Nicolson.
- Price, Neil (2014). The Viking Way: Religion and War in the Later Iron Age of Scandinavia (2nd ed.). Oxbow Books. ISBN 9781842172605.
- Hedeager, Lotte (2011). Iron Age Myth and Materiality: An Archaeology of Scandinavia AD 400–1000. Abingdon: Routledge. ISBN 9780415606042.
- Brink, Stefan; Price, Neil, eds. (2008). The Viking World. London: Routledge. ISBN 9780415333153.
