= Boar's Head Theatre =

Inn-yard theatre in London (1598–c.1616)

Coordinates: 51.5149°N 0.0740°W

The Boar's Head Theatre was an inn-yard theatre in the Whitechapel area of London from 1598 to around 1616.

It was based in the yard of the Boar's Head Inn. During its lifetime as a playhouse, it was home to the Earl of Derby's Men (summer 1599 – summer 1601, summer 1602 – March 1603), the Earl of Worcester's Men (summer 1601 – summer 1602, April 1604–1605 or 1606), and Prince Charles's Men (summer 1609 – March 1616); the historian Herbert Berry suggests that many other unidentified companies may have played there, as well.

== Location ==
The Boar's Head was located on the north side of Whitechapel High Street. Berry notes that "it became a playhouse partly because of where it was — just outside the City of London … a few feet beyond the ordinary jurisdiction of the lord mayor and his aldermen". Until the end of the nineteenth century Boars Head Yard, named after the original inn, was a small alley running between Middlesex Street and Gulston Street, parallel to Whitechapel High Street and just to the northwest of Aldgate East station; Sisson, too, notes that this alley was just beyond the boundary of Portsoken Ward, and thus outside the jurisdiction of the City.

== History ==
As Alexander Leggatt notes, the Boar's Head was originally an inn, which was built in the 1530s. Before 1598, the Boar's Head was simply an inn and did not include any formal playing space. However, it was being used as an extempore venue for plays at least as early as 1557, when an injunction from the Privy Council ordered the Lord Mayor of London to send officers to the Boar's Head to prevent the performance of "a lewd play called a Sack full of News", arrest the performers and confiscate the play-book. The Lord Mayor complied, but in a further letter on the following day the Privy Council ordered the prisoners' release.

It underwent two renovations for use as a playhouse: first, in 1598, when a simple stage was erected, and a second, more elaborate renovation in 1599. In 1616, the lease of the space to Oliver Woodliffe, one of the men responsible for expanding the theatre, expired, and Charles Sisson surmises that this marked the end of the Boar's Head's days as a theatre space.

On 28 November 1594, Jane and Henry Poley, who owned the inn, entered a lease agreement with Oliver and Susan Woodliffe. The agreement began on 25 March 1595 and ended on 24 March 1616 and included a promise to spend £100 during the following seven years to build, among other things, a tiring house and a stage.

In 1598, a primitive stage was built in the middle of the yard, measuring 39 feet 7 inches (12.07 m) by 25 feet (7.6 m). The audience stood mostly in the yard, as the galleries were not big enough to accommodate a large audience. In 1599, Woodliffe and Richard Samwell (who had leased the inn in 1598 from Woodliffe; Woodliffe remained landlord of the theatre) took down the primitive stage setup and built a new playhouse apparently meant to compete with Shakespeare's Globe Theatre, which had just opened on the other side of the Thames. As Leggatt states, "the stage — essentially the same stage — was moved to the west wall so that actors could enter directly on to it from the tiring house, a roof was built over the stage, and the galleries were considerably expanded and roofed with tiles."

Berry lists a number of plays that can be associated with the Boar's Head during its heyday, although he is careful to note that "we cannot show that any surviving plays were unquestionably written for performance at the Boar's Head." He lists "two plays that may well have been written for performance at the Boar's Head":

- A Pleasant conceited Comedie Wherein is shewed how a man may chuse a good Wife from a bad (London, 1602), sundry times Acted by the Earle of Worcesters Seruants."
- The History of the tryall of the Cheualry (London, 1605 twice), "lately acted by the right Honourable the Earle of Darby his seruants."

Also listed are six plays that are less likely to have been written specifically for performance at the Boar's Head but that were published as having belonged to the Queen's men and Prince Charles's men at the time of their respective stints at the Boar's Head:

- Thomas Heywood, If you know not me, You know no bodie (London, 1605)
- Heywood, The Second Part of, If you know now me, you know no bodie (London, 1606)
- No-body and Some-body (London, n.d.), "acted by the Queens Maiesties Seruants"
- Thomas Dekker and John Webster, The Famous History of Sir Thomas Wyat (London, 1607), "As it was plaied by the Queens Maiesties Seruants."
- The Fayre Mayed of the Exchange (London, 1607); often attributed to Heywood.
- William Rowley and Thomas Middleton, A Faire Quarrell (London, 1617), "As it was Acted before the King and diuers times publikely by the Prince his Highnes Seruants."

In 1616, the lease agreement between the Woodliffes and the Poleys (now controlled by Mrs. Poley's heir, Sir John Poley) expired. By this time, the Prince's Men had merged with Lady Elizabeth's Men and had entered into an agreement to play in the Hope Theatre on Bankside. Sisson suggests that Poley "found it more profitable to develop the buildings and site of the Boar's head, or to dispose of it to a speculator, for other purposes than those of an inn and a theatre, in the rapid growth of this residential and industrial suburb of London.".

== Layout ==
As Berry explains, the Boar's Head differed from many other playhouses of the time in that it "was not a single free-standing building, like the Globe, Fortune, and others, but, except for the stage, mostly a scheme of additions and alterations to existing buildings originally meant for very different uses." These other sections included various lodgings, stables, gardens, barns, and, thankfully for its customers, a privy. The Boar's Head featured a covered, square playing area in an age of polygonal playhouses (such as the Globe, the Swan and the Rose) and was surrounded on all sides by the audience.

Even after its expansion, the Boar's Head remained a comparatively small theatre for its time, with only two levels of galleries on the east side, and one each on the north and south sides. (For comparison, the Swan and Fortune theatres each had three levels of galleries.)

== Archaeology ==
In 2019 the Museum of London Archaeology began an excavation of the site, which was intended for preservation within a new building built on the location.

== See also ==
- List of English Renaissance theatres
- English Renaissance theatre
