= Boar's Head Resort =

- Location within Virginia Boar's Head Resort (the United States)

General information
- Location: Charlottesville, Virginia
- Coordinates: 38.048564°N 78.541455°W

The Boar's Head Resort, formerly known as the Boar's Head Inn, is a hotel and resort usually described as being in Charlottesville, Virginia but in fact located in Albemarle County, Virginia just outside the city. The resort is situated on 573 acres (0.895 sq mi) and includes a golf course (the Birdwood Golf Course), 26 tennis courts, and a spa and fitness center.

The hotel was built in 1962 and 1963 based on a design by architects Johnson, Craven & Gibson. As a centerpiece for the hotel, an 1835 grist mill, known for many years as the Eulus Mill, was dismantled and moved to the property. The Boar's Head opened in 1964 with 54 rooms. It was expanded in 1979 with 73 additional rooms and two additional meeting areas.

In 1989, owner John Rogan sold the Boar's Head to the University of Virginia Real Estate Foundation (UREF). UREF lent $10 million to the Boar's head in 1999 to finance renovations and improvements to guest rooms, restaurants, common areas, and athletic facilities.

The Boar's Head Inn was later re-branded as the Boar's Head Resort. In 2012, the property underwent a $9-million renovation of its guest rooms.
