= Boar's Head Inn, Bishop's Stortford =

Pub in Bishop's Stortford, Hertfordshire, England

Coordinates: 51°52′16″N 0°09′26″E

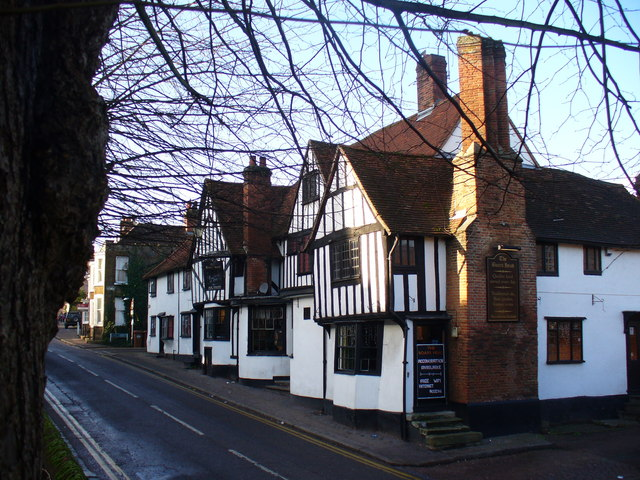
The Boar's Head Inn

The Boar's Head Inn is a Grade II* listed public house in Bishop's Stortford, Hertfordshire, England. The timber framed building was built in the late 16th or early 17th century, and substantially modified in the 18th and 19th centuries. Repair materials in the stables section date to the 15th century.
