= Boar's Head Inn, Southwark =

Former inn in London, England

Coordinates: 51.5019°N 0.0927°W

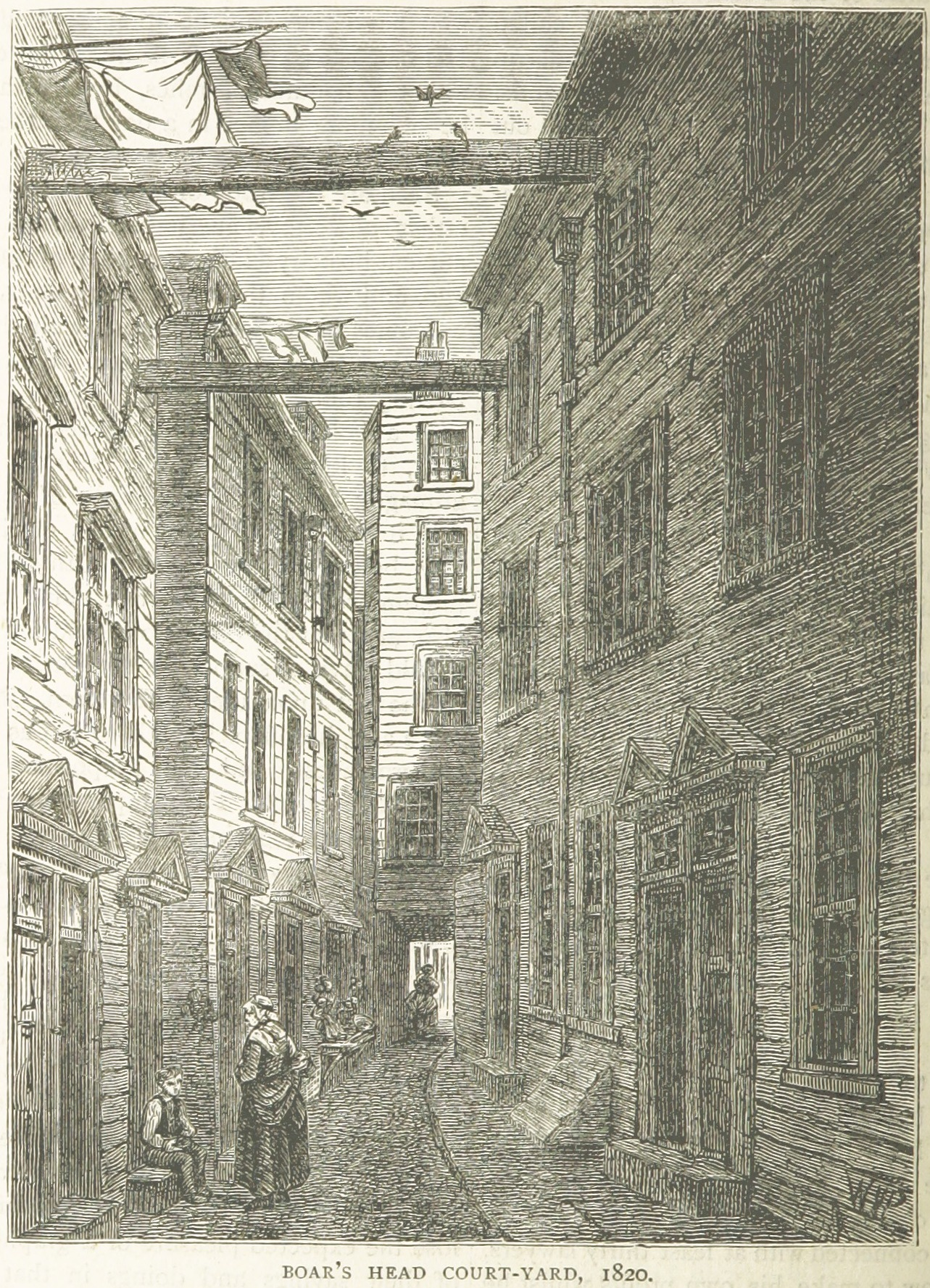
The Boar's Head Court-yard in 1820

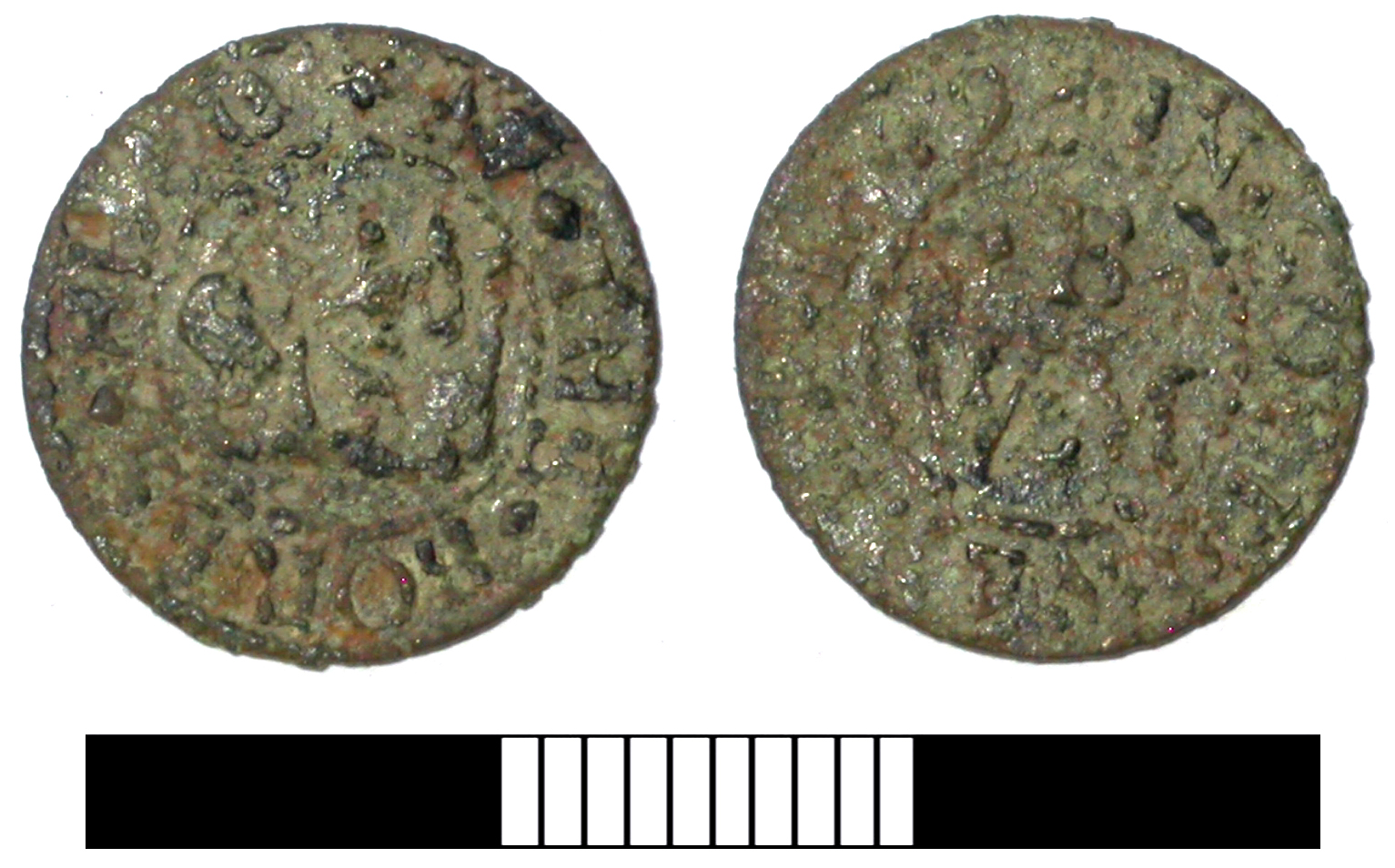
Trader's token from the Boar's Head, Southwark, dated 1649

The Boar's Head Inn was an inn at Southwark in London, owned by Sir John Fastolf, who was the inspiration for the Shakespearean character of Falstaff. While the Boar's Head Inn in Eastcheap is not known to have existed during the reign of Henry IV, this inn may have.
