= Boar's Head Feast =

Festival in the Christmas season

The Boar's Head Feast is a festival of the Christmas season.

== Observances ==
The fest of the Presentation of the Boar's Head is observed at:

- Asylum Hill Congregational Church in Hartford, Connecticut
- Bethlehem Lutheran Church in Saginaw, Michigan
- Lutheran Church in St. Charles, Missouri
- Saint Paul United Methodist Church in Louisville, Kentucky
- The First Church of Winsted in Winsted, Connecticut
- Third Presbyterian Church in Rochester, New York
- Trinity Cathedral in Cleveland, Ohio
- St. Peter's Lutheran Church in Lafayette Hill, Pennsylvania
- First United Methodist Church in Huntsville, Alabama
- Trinity United Methodist Church in Springfield, Massachusetts
- St. John's Episcopal Church in Youngstown, Ohio
- Ivy Hall in West Philadelphia, Pennsylvania. Presented by The Cephalophore Society, a group of Catholic Gentlemen, annually on the feast of St. Thomas Becket
- Plymouth Congregational Church in Fort Wayne, Indiana (since 1975)
- Christ Presbyterian Church in Ellwood City, Pennsylvania
- Hoosac School, Hoosick, New York
- University Christian Church in Fort Worth, Texas
- Christ Church Cathedral, Cincinnati in Cincinnati, Ohio
- St. Mark's in the Valley Episcopal Church in Los Olivos, California

=== Oglethorpe University ===
Oglethorpe University in Atlanta, Georgia celebrates the Boar's Head Ceremony annually on the first Friday in December. Members of the Omicron Delta Kappa society process with a roasted boar's head, followed by a reading of the "Boar's Head" story, a concert and a Christmas tree lighting. University tradition associates the observance with the arms of the university's namesake, James Edward Oglethorpe, depicting three boars' heads and a fourth as a crest.

=== Queens University of Charlotte ===
Through the efforts of Miss Alma Edwards, a greatly beloved Latin professor at Queens University of Charlotte, Queens hosted the first Boar's Head dinner in 1932, which has remained an annual event since that time. The annual feast is hosted by the Department of Student Engagement, within the Division of Student Life, and is a tradition in which seniors are asked to play roles within the telling of the boar's head story with performances by the Dance Club and Choir. Young Dining Hall is decorated for the feast and meals are served family style. The President of the University, and family, is in attendance yearly and personally invites three to four guest to sit with him/her at the head table. The President, President's guest, and seniors within the program, dress in renaissance regalia. Queens presents two boar's heads at the feast, carried in by seniors. At the end of the feast, two faculty members, nominated by seniors, conduct the annual Yule Log Ceremony, weaving through the hall as students tap their holly branches on the yule log for good luck for the new year. At the conclusion of the event, students walk to the fire pit where they throw their holly branches into the fire and sing carols. Information of the history of this event may be found within the archives of Everett Library on campus.

=== University of Rochester ===
In 1934, the presidency of Benjamin Rush Rhees was waning and that of Alan Valentine was rising. Valentine, a Rhodes Scholar at Balliol College, Oxford, helped to solidify this tradition at Rochester. This American variant honors a professor and a club at the university each year hence. The professor is responsible for the recounting of the tale of the boar, often at the expense of the students enrolled in their classes. The student club honored receives the head of the slain boar, the highest honor for that academic year. The feast has been held in numerous locations on the River Campus and has settled into the newly refurbished Richard Feldman Ballroom.

== See also ==
- Sonargöltr
- List of dining events
