= Sir John in Love =

Opera by Ralph Vaughan Williams

- Opera by Ralph Vaughan Williams
- Vaughan Williams c. 1920
- Librettist: Vaughan Williams
- Language: English
- Based on: Shakespeare's The Merry Wives of Windsor
- Premiere: 21 March 1929; Royal College of Music, London

Sir John in Love is an opera in four acts by the English composer Ralph Vaughan Williams. The libretto, by the composer himself, is based on Shakespeare's The Merry Wives of Windsor and supplemented with texts by Philip Sidney, Thomas Middleton, Ben Jonson, and Beaumont and Fletcher. The music deploys English folk tunes, including "Greensleeves". Originally titled The Fat Knight, the opera premiered at the Parry Opera Theatre, Royal College of Music, London, on 21 March 1929. Its first professional performance was on 9 April 1946 at Sadler's Wells Theatre.

== Composition and performance history ==
Vaughan Williams first wrote music for a Shakespeare play in 1913 as music director of the Frank Benson company at Stratford-upon-Avon, composing for five plays - including The Merry Wives of Windsor (where he incorporated 'Greensleeves') and Henry IV, Part 2, although the latter contained no music for Falstaff. His recollection of that season at Stratford may have influenced his choice of The Merry Wives as the subject for what was his second opera (after Hugh the Drover, 1924), but he would also be aware of his friend Gustav Holst's 1924 opera At the Boar's Head, in which the text, compiled from the tavern scenes in Henry IV, made heavy use of English folk songs.

Vaughan Williams adapted The Merry Wives mainly keeping Shakespeare's words, although where the drama demanded an aria or chorus, he used material from other Shakespeare plays (such as Much Ado About Nothing) or from other Elizabethan poets - including Ben Jonson and Thomas Campion as well as 'Greensleeves', sung by Mistress Ford as she awaits a visit from Falstaff, and later for an orchestral interlude.

After the premiere at the Royal College of Music in 1929 it was revived there in 1939. The Sadler's Wells production of 1946 was followed by a New Opera Company production in the same theatre in July 1958 with John Dobson, Eric Shilling, John Cameron, Donald Francke, Adrian de Peyer and Peter Hemmings among the cast, conducted by Brian Priestman. The work was revived by the Kentish Opera Group in 1963 in Orpington conducted by Audrey Langford.

In February 1956 a BBC studio recording with minor cuts was broadcast, with Stanford Robinson conducting the Sadler’s Wells Chorus and Philharmonia Orchestra, and the cast included Roderick Jones as Falstaff, Heddle Nash as Shallow, Parry Jones as Sir Hugh Evans, Denis Dowling as Page, John Kentish as Bardolph, Forbes Robinson as Pistol, April Cantelo as Anne Page, James Johnston as Fenton, Pamela Bowden as Mrs Quickly, Owen Brannigan as The Host and John Cameron as Ford; this was issued on CD by Lyrita in 2016.

Performances of the opera have remained rare, but include 1978 and 1988 productions by the Bronx Opera (New York City) and a 1997 Barbican concert performance conducted by Richard Hickox with Donald Maxwell as Falstaff. The opera received a major UK production in 2006 at English National Opera (ENO), which was ENO's first production of the work, conducted by Oleg Caetani, produced by Ian Judge, with Andrew Shore in the title role. In August 2010, the Australian Shakespeare Festival, an initiative of the University of Tasmania, gave a professional concert presentation of the opera conducted by Myer Fredman. The Royal Conservatoire of Scotland gave four performances of the work in May 2015. In January 2017, the Bronx Opera performed the work as part of their 50th anniversary season. In August 2023 the opera was performed in a semi-staged production at Bard College in the US as part of the Bard SummerScape Music Festival.

Ten folk melodies are quoted - just over 15 minutes - in an opera lasting 130. An old chanson 'Vrai dieu d'amour' is sung by the Frenchman Dr Caius. Vaughan Williams added a Prologue for 1933 Bristol production but this was subsequently withdrawn, and five choruses were published as a cantata In Windsor Forest in 1931.

Winton Dean argues that "the folky idiom of the music" is not suited to the play, which ideally requires "a quicksilver deftness if it is not to become tedious".

== Roles ==
Roles, voice types, premiere casts
Role	Voice type	Premiere cast (amateur) 21 March 1929 Conductor: Malcolm Sargent	Premiere cast (professional) 9 April 1946 Conductor: Lawrance Collingwood
Sir John Falstaff	baritone	Leyland White	Roderick Jones
Anne Page	soprano	Olive Evers	Vera Terry
Mistress Page	soprano	May Moore	Anna Pollak
Mistress Ford	mezzo-soprano	Veronica Mansfield	Minnia Bower
Mistress Quickly	contralto	Hilda Rickard	Valetta Iacopi
Fenton	tenor	A. Bamfield Cooper	Ronald Hill
Doctor Caius	high baritone	Douglas Tichener	Eric Shilling
Frank Ford	bass	Clifford White	Howell Glynne
Robert Shallow	tenor or baritone	Alfred Walmsley	
Sir Hugh Evans	baritone	Albert Kennedy	
Master Slender	tenor	Philip Ward	
Simple	tenor or baritone	William Herbert	
Master George Page	baritone	Thomas Dance	Norman Platt
Bardolph	tenor	Howard Hemming	
Corporal Nym	baritone	Charles Holmes	
Ancient Pistol	bass	George Hancock	
Rugby	bass	Frederick Lloyd	
The Host of the 'Garter Inn'	baritone	John Greenwood	
Robin	non-singing	James Flack	
John	baritone	John Huson	
Robert	baritone	John Gibson	

== Synopsis ==
=== Act 1 ===
Outside Page's house, Justice Shallow and Parson Evans are angry at Sir John Falstaff and his men for getting Abraham Slender drunk and stealing his wallet. Slender is trying to compose a sonnet to express his affection for Anne Page, but cannot get past the line "O sweet Anne Page". Falstaff enters, dismissive of the anger of Shallow and Evans towards him. Anne Page, Mistress Page and Mistress Ford then arrive.

Remaining outside, Evans and Shallow conspire to arrange a match between Slender and Anne Page, and send Simple, Slender's servant, to Mistress Quickly to obtain her assistance. Anne Page then directs the men towards dinner. Left alone, she ponders her mother's wish for her to marry Dr. Caius, whom she does not desire. However, her true love, Master Fenton, then arrives. Anne Page and Fenton sing a duet, but Master Page drives off Fenton, as he thinks that Fenton is only after Anne Page's dowry. Master Page is himself inclined more towards Slender as a match for Anne.

As Fenton hides, Dr. Caius, his servant John Rugby, and Mistress Quickly appear. Caius hopes for Mistress Quickly's assistance in winning over Anne Page. Simple tries to deliver the letter from Slender, but Caius intercepts it, and after reading it, thinks that Evans also has designs on Anne Page. After Caius, Rugby and Simple depart, Fenton appears and gives Mistress Quickly a ring for Anne and some gold for herself, to assist him in winning Anne Page. The gold directs Mistress Quickly to place Fenton at the top of the list of suitors for Anne Page.

In the inn, Falstaff notes that he is facing hard financial times. He comes up with a scheme to seduce Mistresses Ford and Page and swindle them of some money. Falstaff writes identical love letters to Mistresses Ford and Page, but his henchmen Nym and Pistol refuse to be part of this scheme. Falstaff then instructs his page Robin to deliver the separate letters.

Nym and Pistol then decide to inform Master Ford of Falstaff's scheme. Ford enters, already feeling jealousy and suspicion of his wife's fidelity. When Nym and Pistol tell Ford of Falstaff's plan, Ford resolves to visit Falstaff in disguise to see how far Falstaff's plot proceeds. The merry wives, Mistresses Ford and Page, sing of cuckoos in counterpoint to Ford's rage.

=== Act 2 ===
Scene 1: A room in Page's house

In Page's house, Mistress Page reads the letter to her from Falstaff. Mistress Ford then arrives with her own letter from Falstaff. The merry wives compare the letters and see that they are identical except for the names. They vow revenge on Falstaff for his attempted treachery. They engage Mistress Quickly to deliver a message to Falstaff that he should go to Alice Ford's house between ten and eleven that night.

Scene 2: The parlour of the Garter Inn

Bardolph announces to Falstaff the arrival of a visitor, Master "Brook", who is Ford in disguise. "Brook" affects to be in love with Mistress Ford, but that she has a reputation for fidelity. He offers Falstaff money to see if Falstaff can seduce Mistress Ford on his behalf. "Brook" is shocked to learn that Falstaff already has a planned assignation with Mistress Ford that night. After Falstaff leaves, Ford tears off his disguise and rages against his wife's apparent infidelity.

=== Act 3 ===
Scene 1: A footpath near Windsor

Fenton asks for the Inn Host's assistance to win Anne Page. Anne arrives, initially expressing some doubts because of Fenton's past association with Falstaff, but he convinces her of his true love. She then tells him of her mother's plan to marry her off to Caius, and her father's plan to marry her off to Slender. Her intention, however, is to marry Fenton, and the Inn Host plans to find a priest to officiate a ceremony between them.

Scene 2: A field near Windsor

Caius enters, with plans to challenge Evans to a duel over Anne Page. Caius, along with Ford, Shallow, Slender and the Inn Host, meet Evans by the river bank for the duel. However, the duel between Caius and Evans gradually peters out, until the Host asks them for mutual forgiveness to each other and reconciliation at the Inn over a pint. Ford then invites the company to his house, intending to show them a "monster".

Scene 3: A room in Ford's house

At Ford's house, the merry wives, with Mistress Quickly present, are setting the trap for Falstaff, in the form of a laundry hamper. Mistress Ford instructs her servants to dump the contents of the hamper into a ditch on her command. All except Mistress Ford hide, who sings "Greensleeves" in preparation for Falstaff's arrival. Falstaff appears, but before he can start in earnest on the seduction, Mistress Quickly bursts in to warn of Mistress Page rushing over to the house. Mistress Page suddenly comes in to let everyone know that Master Ford is en route to the house in a jealous rage, which to her is part of the scheme to dupe Falstaff, except that Ford truly is on his way to the house, of which no one is aware. The only place for Falstaff to hide is the laundry basket. Falstaff therein hides, and then Ford and his followers suddenly show up, in search of the "monster" alluded to earlier. Mistress Ford directs her servants to remove the laundry basket, which they do, under great strain because of Falstaff's weight. Ford only succeeds in finding Mistress Page hidden behind a curtain.

=== Act 4 ===
Scene 1: A room in Ford's house

Ford asks forgiveness from his wife, which she grants. The Fords and Pages then plot a final revenge on Falstaff, by luring him to Windsor Forest, where legend has it that Herne the Hunter haunts Herne's Oak, and fairies torment unaware travellers. Mistress Page intends to dress as the fairy queen, and with the help of local children, will taunt Falstaff. Mistress Page tells Caius that Anne will be wearing green, to allow him to find her. In turn, Master Page informs Slender that Anne will be wearing white.

Scene 2: Windsor Forest

Falstaff has received a communication from Mistress Ford to meet her at Herne's Oak, dressed as Herne the Hunter, and wearing antlers, in the hope of frightening away any intruders. The merry wives arrive, but before anything between the three of them can happen, some fairies appear and the merry wives quickly depart. Anne Page, dressed in blue, appears with a group of fairies and leads a dance around Herne's Oak. Caius and Slender each arrive, and search respectively for a fairy dressed in green and in white, which they each find and then depart. Fenton arrives and finds Anne Page, and they leave. The fairies tease Falstaff, until a horn call stops the action.

The Fords and Pages come on the scene, and Falstaff realises that he has been tricked. He takes it in good humour. Master Page now says that by this point, Anne is married to Slender. Slender arrives with his new "bride", who turns out to be young William Page in disguise. In turn, Mistress Page says that Anne is now married to Caius. Caius appears, with his "bride", who is actually Falstaff's page, Robin. Fenton and Anne finally appear, and reveal to all that they are officially married. The opera ends with a chorus of reconciliation.

== Recordings ==
- Lyrita: April Cantelo (Anne Page), Laelia Finneberg (Mrs Page), Marion Lowe (Mrs Ford), Pamela Bowden (Mrs Quickly), Heddle Nash (Shallow), Parry Jones (Sir Hugh Evans), James Johnston (Fenton), Gerald Davies (Slender), Andrew Gold (Peter Simple), John Kentish (Bardolph), Roderick Jones (Sir John Falstaff), Francis Loring (Dr Caius), Denis Dowling (Page), Owen Brannigan (Host of the Garter), Denis Catlin (Nym), John Cameron (Ford), Forbes Robinson (Pistol), Ronald Lewis (Rugby), Sadler’s Wells Chorus, Philharmonia Orchestra; Stanford Robinson, conductor. 1956 BBC recording. Lyrita REAM.2122 (two CDs)
- EMI Classics: Terry Jenkins (Shallow), Rowland Jones (Sir Hugh Evans), Bernard Dickerson (Slender), David Johnston (Peter Simple), John Noble (Master Page), Raimund Herincx (Sir John Falstaff), John Winfield (Bardolph), Mark Rowlinson (Nym), Richard Van Allan (Pistol), Wendy Eathorne (Anne Page), Felicity Palmer (Mistress Page), Elizabeth Bainbridge (Mistress Ford), Robert Tear (Fenton), Gerald English (Dr Caius), Lawrence Richard (Rugby), Helen Watts (Mistress Quickly), Colin Wheatley (Host of the Garter Inn), Robert Lloyd (Master Ford), Brian Ethridge (John), Stephen Varcoe (Robert); John Alldis Choir; New Philharmonia Orchestra; Meredith Davies, conductor. Recorded London 4–13 July 1974, released 1975 as EMI 5 66123 2; digitally remastered 1997, reissued by ArkivMusic 10 October 2002 as EMI Classics 66123. Duration: 63:56+66:37 = 130:33
- Chandos CHAN 9928(2): Adrian Thompson (Shallow, solo parts; Dr Caius), Stephan Loges (Shallow, ensemble parts; Host of the Garter Inn), Stephen Varcoe (Sir Hugh Evans), Daniel Norman (Slender), Henry Moss (Peter Simple), Roderick Williams (Master Page), Donald Maxwell (Sir John Falstaff), John Bowen (Bardolph), Richard Lloyd-Morgan (Nym), Brian Bannatyne-Scott (Pistol), Susan Gritton (Anne Page), Laura Claycomb (Mistress Page), Sarah Connolly (Mistress Ford), Mark Padmore (Fenton), Mark Richardson (Rugby), Anne-Marie Owens (Mistress Quickly), Matthew Best (Master Ford); Sinfonia Chorus; Northern Sinfonia; Richard Hickox, conductor. Originally recorded in 2000; release date: June 2001. Duration: 136:27.
