= Doll Tearsheet =

Character in Henry IV, Part 2

Dorothy "Doll" Tearsheet
- Henriad character
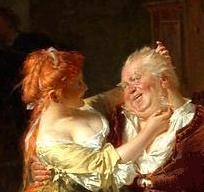
- Doll Tearsheet with Falstaff, detail of a painting by Eduard von Grützner
- First appearance: Henry IV, Part 2
- Created by: William Shakespeare

In-universe information
- Gender: Female
- Occupation: Prostitute
- Religion: Christian
- Nationality: English

Dorothy "Doll" Tearsheet is a fictional character who appears in Shakespeare's play Henry IV, Part 2. She is a prostitute who frequents the Boar's Head Inn in Eastcheap. Doll is close friends with Mistress Quickly, the proprietress of the tavern, who procures her services for Falstaff.

Doll is noted for her wide repertoire of colourful insults and her sudden switches from wild tirades to sentimental intimacy and back again.

== In the play ==
Doll is introduced by name when Mistress Quickly asks Falstaff whether he would like her company that evening. The Page later mentions to Prince Hal and Poins that Falstaff will be seeing her, primly referring to her as "a proper gentlewoman, sir, and a kinswoman of my master's", though Hal quickly concludes that she is probably "some road" (meaning a whore: accessible to anyone, as in the phrase "as common as the cart-way").

Doll is first seen about to be sick after drinking too much "canaries" (fortified wine from the Canary Islands). When Falstaff arrives they exchange lewd banter about venereal disease. Informed that Ancient Pistol is at the door, Doll insists that he should not be allowed in because he's "the foul-mouthed'st rogue in England." After Pistol enters, Doll berates him with a string of insults: "I scorn you, scurvy companion. What! you poor, base, rascally, cheating, lack-linen mate! Away, you mouldy rogue, away!" She then threatens him with a knife, and Pistol pulls his sword. In the ensuing fight, Falstaff and Bardolph force him out.

After his display of fighting prowess, Doll becomes very solicitous to Falstaff, calling him a "whoreson little valiant villain". She sits on his knee and kisses him. She asks him what Prince Hal is like; Falstaff gives a rather unflattering picture of him, unaware that Hal and Poins are nearby. When they reveal themselves, Falstaff claims he was intentionally "dispraising" the prince in the presence of "the wicked". Hal professes to be shocked, describing Doll as a "virtuous gentlewoman", to the enthusiastic agreement of Mistress Quickly. But Falstaff says Doll is "in hell already, and burns poor souls" (a reference to the burning sensation of venereal disease). When Falstaff is called away to the war, Doll becomes tearful. He leaves, but then calls on her to join him.

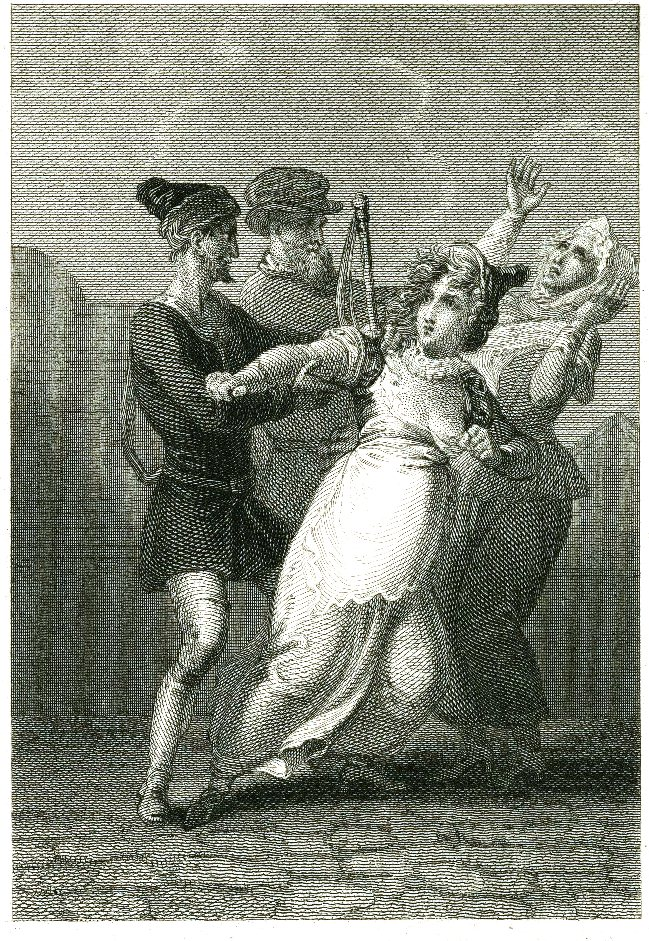
The seemingly pregnant Doll being arrested. Engraving by Richard Rhodes

She next appears, apparently heavily pregnant, with Mistress Quickly. They are being arrested because Pistol has beaten up a man in a brawl in which they were involved. The man has since died. The officer says she will probably be whipped. Doll says that she should not be manhandled because she might have a miscarriage, but the arresting officer insists she has stuffed a cushion up her dress. Doll unleashes a stream of insults directed at the arresting officer's skinniness.

After the death of King Henry IV, Falstaff learns about Doll's arrest and promises to have her released. But Hal, now king, refuses to listen to him.

== References in Henry V ==
Though she does not appear in Henry V, Doll is mentioned several times, though in contexts which appear to be inconsistent with one another. Pistol marries Mistress Quickly, whose first name is Nell. He gets into an argument with Corporal Nym, who himself wanted to marry her, and tells Nym to go to the hospital ('spital) and find Doll in the ward for sexually transmitted diseases ("the powdering tub of infamy") and marry her: "Fetch forth the lazar kite of Cressid's kind,/ Doll Tearsheet she by name, and her espouse". After the Battle of Agincourt he receives a letter, from which he learns that "my Doll is dead in the 'spital" from "malady of France", i.e. syphilis. It is unclear whether this refers to Doll Tearsheet or Mistress Quickly, since the next line says he has lost his home, implying that the woman referred to is the person he lives with. It is often amended to "Nell" in modern editions. The Quarto version says "Doll is sick", not "dead", leaves out the "my", and makes no reference to losing a home.

It has been suggested that a version of Henry V existed in which Falstaff appeared, perhaps married to Quickly (which he said he would do in Henry IV, Part 2). At the epilogue to Henry IV, Part 2 Shakespeare had promised another play to "continue the story, with Sir John in it", but Falstaff does not appear in existing versions of Henry V. If such a version existed Pistol may have married Doll. If this highly speculative hypothesis is true, when Falstaff was cut out, much of his part was reassigned to Pistol, but the passage apparently referring to Doll as his wife was accidentally left unchanged.

== Character ==
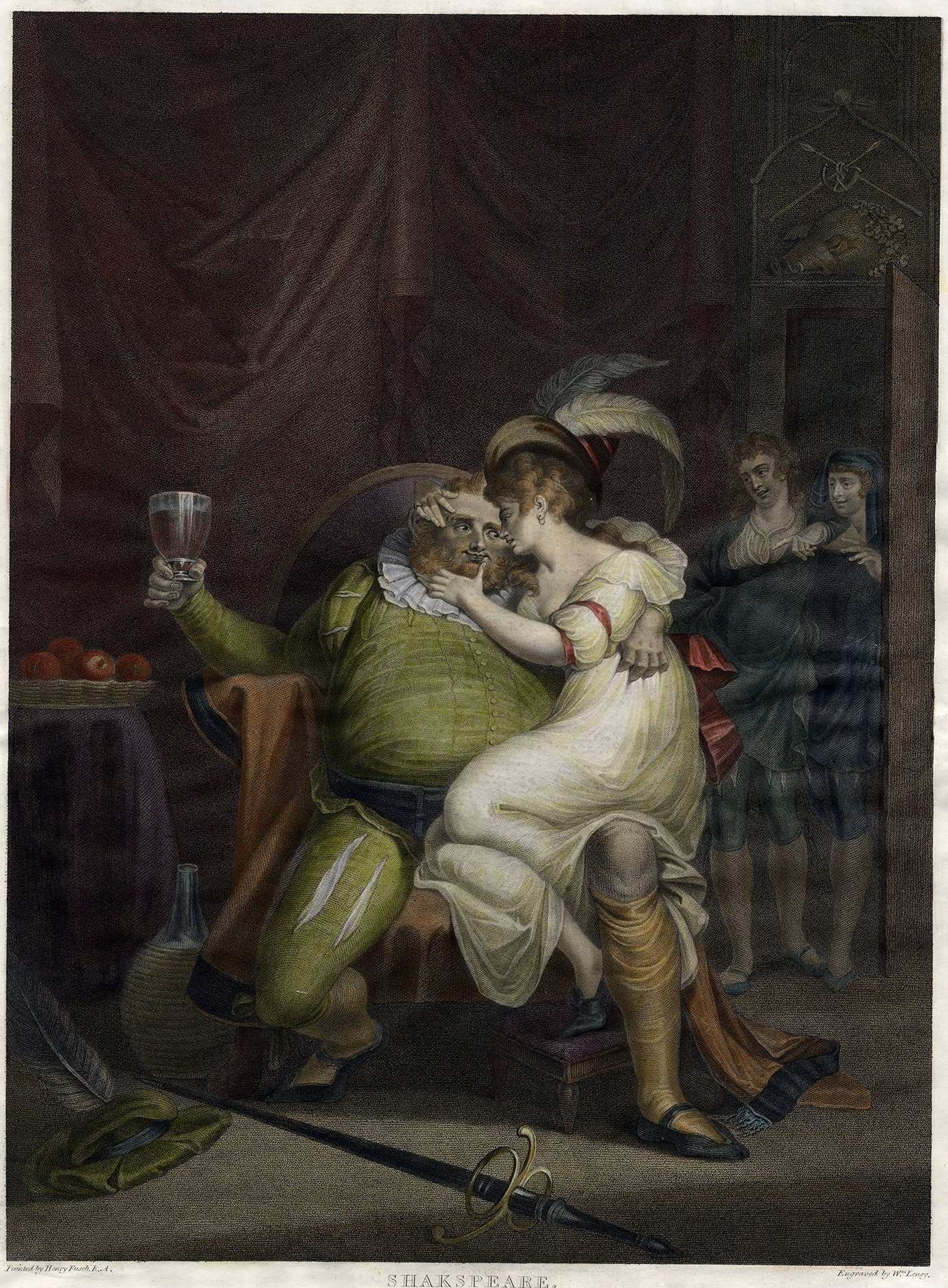
Falstaff with Doll Tearsheet, print after Henry Fuseli

Doll's name is obviously emblematic of her trade. A contraction of Dorothy, the name "Doll", with its connotation of "plaything", was often given to prostitute characters, as with Doll Common in Jonson's play The Alchemist. Her surname is suggestive of her activities, as is that of the other "loose woman" mentioned in the play, Jane Nightwork. Stanley Wells and Eric Partridge say she is "so called, either because she tore the bed-sheets in her amorous tossings or because her partners did so while consorting with her". According to René Weis,

"Tearsheet' has been read as a misprint for 'Tearstreet' (i.e. street-walker) in the light of Hal's anticipating to meet 'some road' ( 2. 2.158), but a 'sheet-walker' or 'tearer' is equally plausible, in view particularly of Beaumont and Fletcher Valentinian 3. 1.340-1, where Maximus says 'If my wife for all this should be a whore now, / A kind of kicker out of sheets'"

Harold Bloom says that Doll's eccentric compliments to Falstaff ("thou whoreson little tidy Bartholomew boar-pig") complement Hal's own apparently affectionate insults, with the difference that Doll's are sincere, since "Falstaff the Bartholomew boar-pig has just proved himself to his doxy as being, in her words, a 'whoreson little valiant villain', and is fully to her taste. Falstaff the Manningtree ox, however, has just been unmercifully made game of by the Prince for running away at Gadshill in a fashion that could only, by everyone in the tavern company except Falstaff, be taken as showing downright cowardice."

== In other literature ==
Doll appears along with Falstaff's other cronies in the play Falstaff's Wedding (1766), a comedy by William Kenrick, which is set in the period between the end of Henry IV, Part 2 and the beginning of Henry V. Doll and Mistress Quickly, having bribed their way out of prison, appear in the first act explaining to Falstaff how they were arrested. They later plot to disguise themselves as gentlewomen to find rich husbands, targeting Robert Shallow and Abraham Slender. Quickly intends to marry Shallow, and Doll to marry Slender. The plan appears to succeed, but Shallow and Slender find out their true identities and switch places at the weddings with Ancient Pistol and Corporal Nym, so Doll ends up married to Nym.

James White's book Falstaff's Letters (1796) purports to be a collection of letters written by Falstaff and his cronies, provided by a descendant of Mistress Quickly's sister. Several letters from Quickly to Falstaff complain about his treatment of Doll.

In Oliver St. John Gogarty's poem "Applied Poetry" Doll is invoked. The poet tells his beloved that she is filled with the beauties of springtime, and like the breeze that sways a field of buttercups, "As if Doll Tearsheet lay / And leapt again". When she expresses outrage at being compared to a whore, he explains,

But she was meant to show,
(If Will gave lessons)
That only women know
The human essence,
And see beneath a part,
Though clothed upon
By Evil, the rich heart
Of gross Sir John;
Which no one else perceived.

Doll also appears as a character in Gustav Holst's 1925 opera At the Boar's Head. A soprano role, it was first performed by Constance Willis, conducted by Malcolm Sargent.
