= Ned Poins =

Character in Henry IV, parts 1 and 2

Edward Pons
- Henriad character
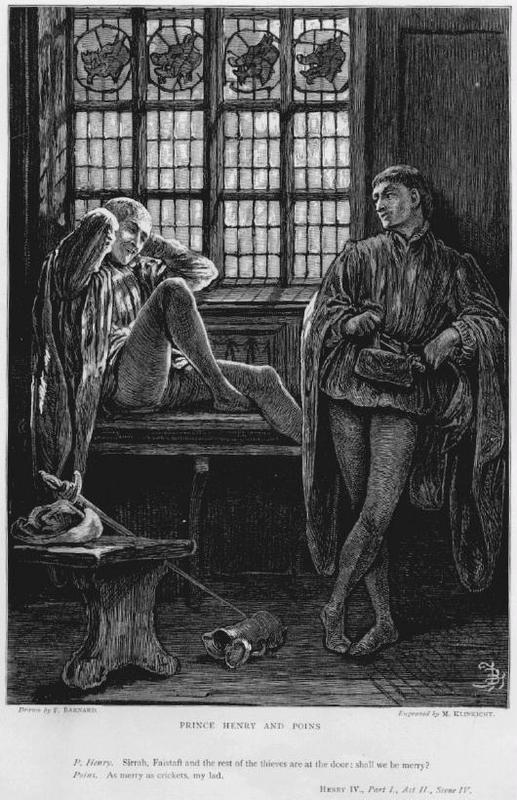
- Poins and Hal, illustration by Fred Barnard
- First appearance: Henry IV, Part 1
- Last appearance: Henry IV, Part 2
- Created by: William Shakespeare
- Portrayed by: Tony Beckley; Jack Galloway

In-universe information
- Gender: Male
- Occupation: royal hanger-on
- Religion: Christian
- Nationality: English

Edward "Ned" Poins, generally referred to as "Poins" /ˈpɔɪnz/, is a fictional character who appears in two plays by William Shakespeare, Henry IV, Part 1 and Henry IV, Part 2. He is also mentioned in The Merry Wives of Windsor. Poins is Prince Hal's closest friend during his wild youth. He devises various schemes to ridicule Falstaff, his rival for Hal's affections.

Unlike Hal's other principal low-life associates, who all either reappear or are mentioned in Henry V, Poins disappears from the narrative with no explanation.

== In the plays ==
Poins appears early in Henry IV, Part I to inform Falstaff that at Gads Hill there will be unprotected "pilgrims going to Canterbury with rich offerings, and traders riding to London with fat purses". He suggests that they organise a robbery. When Falstaff and the others agree, Poins says to Hal that the pair of them should play a trick on Falstaff by letting them rob the travellers, but then in disguise robbing the robbers of their haul. The point of the jest will be to hear the "incomprensible [i.e. enormous] lies" Falstaff will later tell to excuse himself. When Poins and Hal attack Falstaff after the robbing the travellers, he and his followers instantly run away.

Poins is with Hal when Hal plays a joke on Francis, a drawer (waiter) at the Boar's Head. He also listens to Falstaff's increasingly ridiculous lies.

In Part 2 Poins discusses the illness of Hal's father the king, expecting Hal to be pleased at the prospect of his father's death. Hal gets a letter from Falstaff, in which Falstaff tells him not to trust Poins because he has been telling people that Hal will be marrying Poins' sister Nell. Poins denies it. Bardolph and a boy arrive with news that Falstaff is meeting Doll Tearsheet at the tavern. Poins suggests that they disguise themselves again, this time as waiters, to overhear the conversation. At the tavern, Doll asks why Hal likes Poins, Falstaff says that they are both similar in size and shape, and equally empty headed: "His wit’s as thick as Tewkesbury mustard. There's no more conceit in him than is in a mallet [i.e. he's got no more brains than a hammer]."

== Character role ==
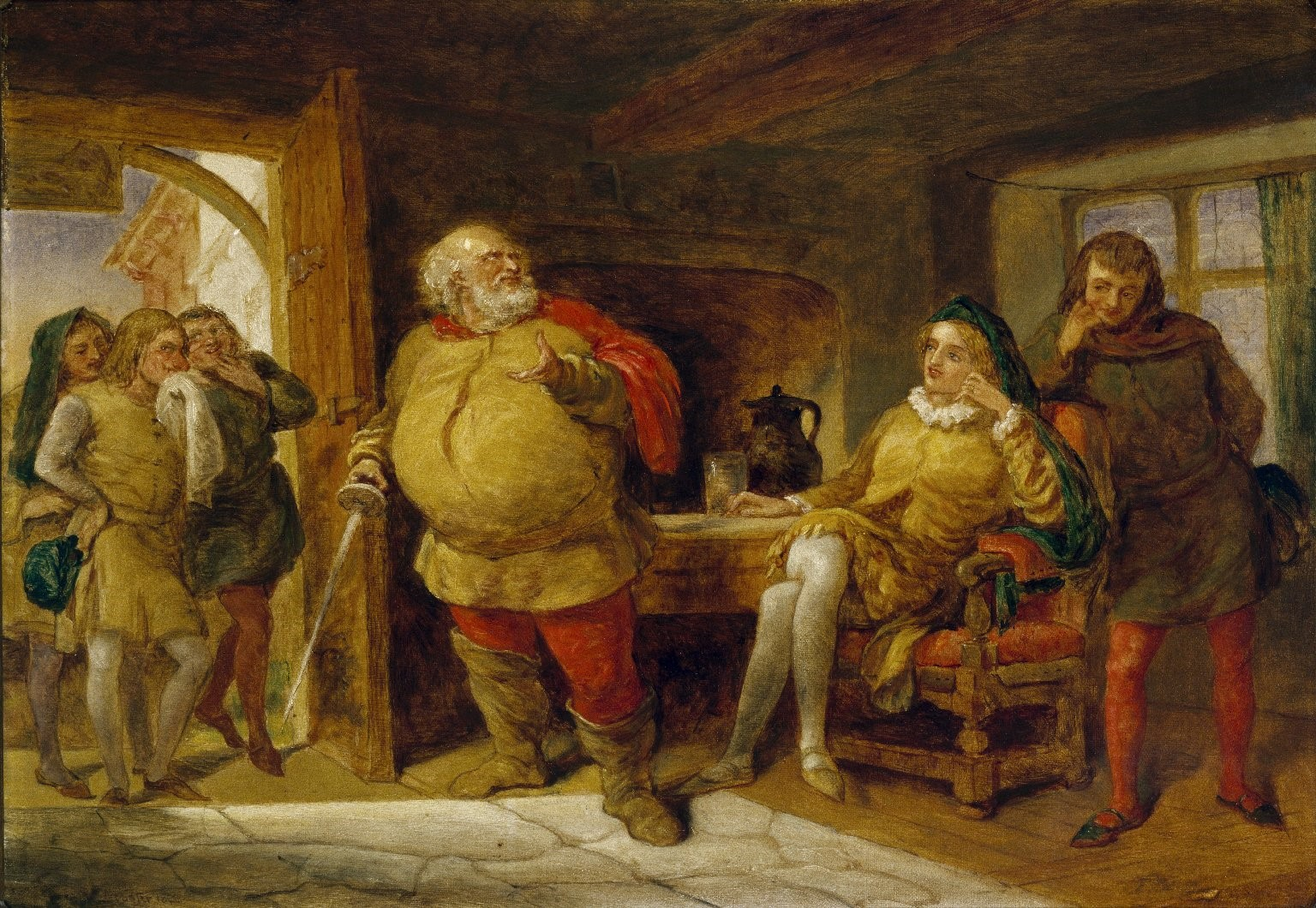
Hal and Poins listen to Falstaff's story of the robbery.

Poins' principal role is to act as Hal's confidant. In Part 2 especially he is little more than a sounding board for Hal's views. In Part 1 he is presented as the more assertive of the two, being the "mastermind" of both the Gads Hill robbery and its comeuppance. In this respect Poins is an ambiguous figure, who is both part of the criminal underworld and also of the superior social world that looks down on it and undermines it. He is "of uncertain social standing", but his comment that his only problem is that he is a "second brother" implies that he is "a gentleman with no inheritance, his gentility making him an appropriate companion for Hal". He represents wayward tendencies within the upper class, closely linked to Hal's own behaviour.

The fact that Poins disappears from the narrative after the end of Henry IV, Part 2 suggests that his identity cannot be incorporated into the continuing story; he is neither a "low life" character, nor a participant in the high politics of the new regime. He is effectively a "shadow" side of Hal himself. In Part 2 in particular, Hal appears to become visibly embittered by his association with the world of Falstaff and Poins, using increasingly open derogatory language about both of them, but Poins is never explicitly rejected, unlike Falstaff.

Throughout both plays the tension between Poins and Falstaff beneath the apparent bonhomie represents their competition for Hal's favour and each one's willingness to undermine the other. However, while Poins' accusations against Falstaff are proven correct, it is never clear whether Falstaff's accusation about Poins' sister is true or a lie.

Poins' ambiguous role is further implied by the reference to him in The Merry Wives of Windsor, in which Anne Page's suitor Fenton is said to have been a companion of "the wild Prince and Poins". According to Giorgio Melchiori, "the mention of Poins is meant to place Fenton in a separate category from Falstaff and the other companions of the Prince", since Poins is the Prince's confidant, and implicitly a member of the gentility, albeit a wayward one. This implies that Fenton has had a bit of a wild youth, but is not directly tainted with criminality.

== Sources ==
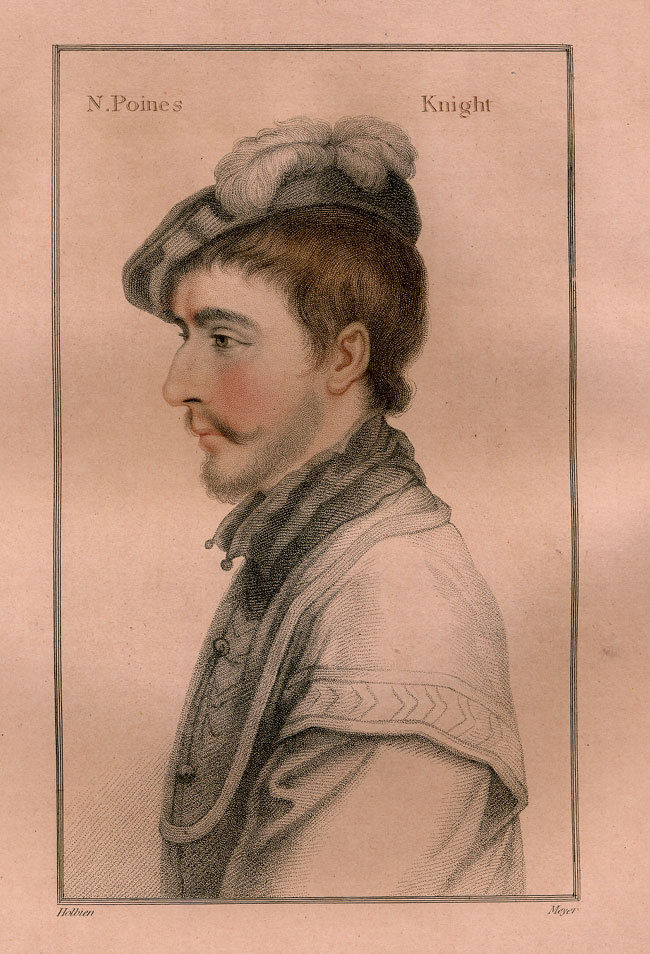
Sir Nicholas Poins, depicted by Hans Holbein the Younger

Poins is a development of the character "Ned" in Shakespeare's principal source, The Famous Victories of Henry V. Some passages appear to be derived directly from the earlier play, such as the conversation in which Poins says Hal would be thought a hypocrite if he mourned for his estranged father, which derives from a scene in Famous Victories in which Ned says that mourning would "make folks believe the death of your father grieves you, and tis nothing so".

The name Poins may come from the Poins family, based in Gloucestershire, descended from the Baron Poyntz, who was active in the reign of Edward I. In 1869 G.R. French argued that "it is probable that Shakespeare intended him for a cadet of the family of Poyntz, one of high antiquity in Gloucestershire". Members of the Poins family had been courtiers in the reign of Henry VIII. Sir Nicholas Poins was depicted by Holbein. Thomas Wyatt dedicated his poem "Of the Courtier's Life", which satirises court cronyism, to John Poins. Poins' reference to being a younger brother (and therefore not the inheritor of the family estate) implies that he comes from an established family.

In the earliest version of Henry IV, Part 1 all of Falstaff's cronies had names derived from established families of the era, but most were later changed. Melchiori considers it significant that Poins was the only one whose name was not changed. The character appears to have been popular with audiences at the time. According to Leonard Digges, writing shortly after Shakespeare's death, many plays could not get good audiences, "but let Falstaff come, Hal, Poins and the rest, you scarce shall have a room".

== In other literature ==
The mystery of Poins' fate is explained in William Kenrick's play Falstaff's Wedding (1760) in which it is revealed that Hal really did have a relationship with Poins' beautiful sister Eleanor. His love for Nell Poins led him to spare Poins the fate of the other former companions, but he was removed from the king's company by being given an administrative position in the north of England.

Robert Brough's 1858 novel The Life of Sir John Falstaff also says that Poins escaped the fate of the other companions. Poins is depicted as a slavish follower of Hal:

This was a young gentleman of good family, but bad morals; that is to say, for the present. He was one of those loyal natures who, in all ages, are to be found attaching themselves instinctively to some great man, taking their tone and colour in all things from the illustrious model. Mr. Poins cut his hair and his conscience in exact imitation of the Prince of Wales. The existing court fashions, as established by the Prince, were long hanging sleeves, pointed shoes, late hours, intoxication, and roystering. Mr. Poins followed them all with scrupulous fidelity; but was quite ready to change them for sad-coloured doublets, square toes, early rising, temperance, and respectability, at a moment's notice.

When Hal becomes king, Poins is rewarded for his loyalty with a knighthood. The now "Sir Edward Poins" writes a dismissive letter to Falstaff informing him that he will only be allowed in the royal palace when it is open to the public for viewing tapestries.

In Robert Nye's 1976 novel Falstaff, written as the autobiography of the knight, Falstaff refers to Poins as Hal's squire. He says "I never liked Ned Poins. He didn't like me either", calling him "a greasy little prick". After saying that Poins was homosexual, he adds that he once spent the night with Mistress Quickly to win a bet, but was terrified by her body. He was first disturbed by the sight of her pubic hair, but ended up "shitting in the bed" when she tried to arouse him sexually. Mirroring Shakespeare's unexplained dropping of Poins, Falstaff says he will show his contempt for him by simply omitting him from the rest of the narrative: "it will give me great pleasure to write him right out of my book", as "one of the pleasures of authorship" is simply "forgetting a character".
