= At the Boar's Head =

1925 opera by Gustav Holst

- Opera by Gustav Holst
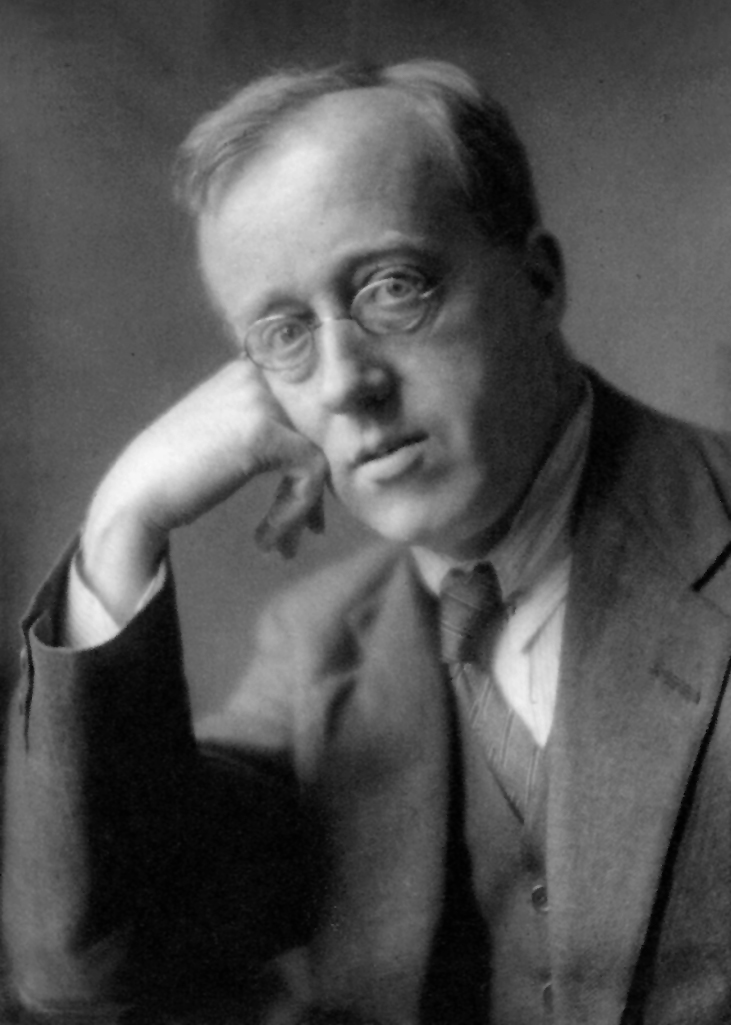
- Holst, circa 1921
- Librettist: Gustav Holst
- Based on: Henry IV, Part 1 & Part 2 by Shakespeare

At the Boar's Head is an opera in one act by the English composer Gustav Holst, his op. 42. Holst himself described the work as "A Musical Interlude in One Act". The libretto, by the composer himself, is based on Shakespeare's Henry IV, Part 1 and Henry IV, Part 2.

== Development ==
Holst devised the idea for this opera in 1924, whilst convalescing from an illness. During this period, he alternated between reading Henry IV, Part I and an edition of John Playford's The English Dancing Master, as well as folk melodies collected by Cecil Sharp and others. Holst noticed that the rhythm and metre of Shakespeare's lines matched the tunes in the Playford, as well as the tunes that Sharp and others had collected. He then decided to set a number of those melodies to a story assembled from episodes set at the Boar's Head Inn from the two parts of Henry IV. Three of the melodic passages are original, including a recitative for Prince Hal and a setting for the sonnets. Otherwise, Holst devised his score from reworking the collected folk tunes. Imogen Holst summarised the folk tunes which her father used in the score as follows:

- John Playford, The English Dancing Master: 28 country dance tunes
- Cecil Sharp, published editions: 4 morris tunes, 1 traditional country dance
- Chappell, Popular Music of the Olden Time: 3 ballads
- G. B. Gardiner, manuscript collection: 2 folksongs

== Production and reception ==
The opera received its first performance at the Palace Theatre, Manchester, on 3 April 1925, by the British National Opera Company, with Malcolm Sargent conducting. A performance at the Golders Green Hippodrome followed on 20 April 1925, with the following singers among the cast:

- Norman Allin (Falstaff)
- Constance Wills (Doll Tearsheet)
- Tudor Davies (Prince Hal)

Holst's opera was part of a double bill with Puccini's Gianni Schicchi. The first US performance was in February 1935 in New York City, at the MacDowell Club, conducted and directed by Sandor Harmati.

Contemporary audiences overall gave the opera a lukewarm reception. Imogen Holst said of the opera that it contained "very little relief from the onslaught of the counterpoint". Hugh Ottaway has commented that another reason for the failure of the opera was that the music did not add sufficiently to the original texts.

== Roles ==
Roles, voice types, premiere cast
Role	Voice type	Premiere cast, 3 April 1925 Conductor: Malcolm Sargent
Falstaff	bass	Norman Allin
Prince Hal	tenor	Tudor Davies
Poins	bass	
Bardolph	baritone	
Doll Tearsheet	soprano	Constance Willis
Peto	tenor	
Pistol	baritone	
Hostess	soprano	

== Synopsis ==
The opera observes classical unities of a single setting for the plot, with the events occurring in real time on a single day. The story focuses on the conversations between Falstaff and Prince Hal, and the characters who wander in and out of the Boar's Head Tavern in Eastcheap. Throughout the story, the sound of door knocks bring reminders of events happening in the world outside the tavern, including the marching of soldiers to war.

The story begins in late afternoon, as Bardolph, Gadshill and Peto sing and drink in an upstairs room at the tavern. Falstaff arrives, followed by Prince Hal and Poins, whom Falstaff accuses of cowardice, for not assisting him in an attempted highway robbery earlier that day. Falstaff exaggerates the story, until Prince Hal says that he and Poins had stolen from Falstaff money that had prior been taken from unarmed travellers.

The Hostess announces the arrival of a gentleman from Court, whereupon Falstaff and the others leave. After Prince Hal delivers a soliloquy, Falstaff and the others return with news that civil war has begun. Falstaff advises Prince Hal to rehearse what he will say to the King before he returns to Court. Prince Hal practices with Falstaff in the role of the King, and later the two trade roles.

Doll Tearsheet arrives, and Prince Hal and Poins don disguises to be able to observe her and Falstaff's behaviour. Falstaff asks for a song, whereupon the disguised Prince Hal sings Shakespeare's sonnet 19, "Devouring Time, blunt though the lion's paws". Falstaff is displeased and interrupts with the ballad "When Arthur first in Court began", and the two songs continue in parallel. A distant march precedes a communication from Bardolph to Prince Hal, who must go to the Court at Westminster. Prince Hal and Poins remove their disguises and leave to the shouts of the outside crowd.

Pistol calls to Falstaff off-stage, and then enters the inn, in spite of the misgivings of Doll and the concern of the Hostess for the inn's reputation. Pistol and Doll argue vehemently, and Pistol is ejected. Bardolph arrives with word that a dozen captains are searching all the taverns for Falstaff. Falstaff bids Doll farewell, but at the end, before all the men go off to war, Bardolph brings a last message for Doll Tearsheet to meet Falstaff one last time. The hostess pushes Doll through the door to the assignation at the close of the opera.

== Recording ==
- HMV 7243 5 65127 2 6: Philip Langridge (Prince Hal), John Tomlinson (Falstaff), Elise Ross (Hostess), Felicity Palmer (Doll Tearsheet), David Wilson-Johnson (Pistol), Peter Hall (Peto), Richard Suart (Bardolph), Michael George (Poins); Liverpool Philharmonic Choir, Royal Liverpool Philharmonic Orchestra; David Atherton, conductor
