= Robert Shallow =

Character in two of Shakespeare's plays

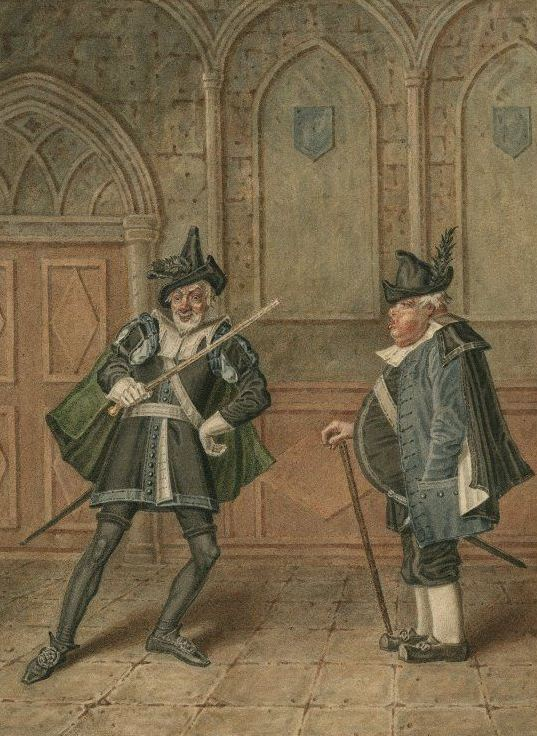
Shallow and Silence by J. Coghlan, c.1820

Robert Shallow is a fictional character who appears in Shakespeare's plays Henry IV, Part 2 and The Merry Wives of Windsor. He is a wealthy landowner and Justice of the Peace in Gloucestershire, who at the time of The Merry Wives of Windsor is said to be over 80 ("four score years and upward").

A thin, vain and often self-deluding individual, used to life in the provinces, Shallow functions as a dramatic foil to the rotund and worldly Sir John Falstaff, who visits Shallow's lands on royal business, but later returns intending to fleece Shallow of his money. In the Merry Wives he visits Windsor with his relative Slender, encountering Falstaff once more.

It has long been speculated that Shallow is a satire of Sir Thomas Lucy, a local landowner near Stratford-upon-Avon, with whom Shakespeare is said to have got into trouble as a young man. Other real-life models have also been proposed.

== Henry IV, Part 2 ==
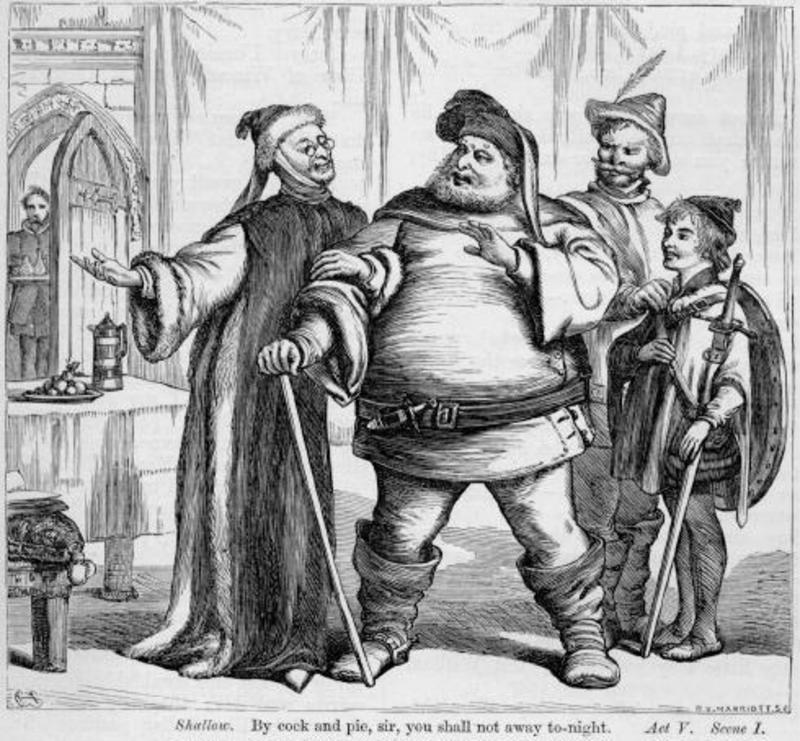
Justice Shallow tries to get Falstaff to stay for the night

In Henry IV, Part 2 Falstaff is commissioned to raise troops for the royal army to deal with a rebellion in the north. Shallow has been tasked to find suitable recruits in his locality. He tells his colleague Justice Silence that he looks forward to meeting Falstaff, who he hasn't seen for many years. He then reminisces about his youthful wild antics as a law student at Clement's Inn when Falstaff was a boy. When Falstaff arrives, Shallow is delighted by his witticisms, and invites him to stay longer.

In a soliloquy after Shallow leaves, Falstaff tells the audience that Shallow's recollections of his supposedly wild student days are full of lies; that Shallow in those days was a skinny, feeble "cheese paring" of a man, noted only for his lechery. The local prostitutes called him "mandrake" because he looked like a "forked radish" when naked. But now he's wealthy, he's ripe for exploitation.

After the defeat of the rebels, Falstaff visits Shallow, claiming that when the Prince becomes king, Falstaff will be in a position to give Shallow an important and remunerative post. He borrows £1000 from Shallow on this basis. The two get drunk and reminisce again. News arrives that the old king is dead, so they rush to London. When the new king rejects Falstaff, Shallow demands his money back. When it becomes obvious Falstaff can't pay him back, he says he'll settle for half, but Falstaff says that's not possible. Shallow is forced out of the king's presence along with the lowlife characters.

== Merry Wives of Windsor ==
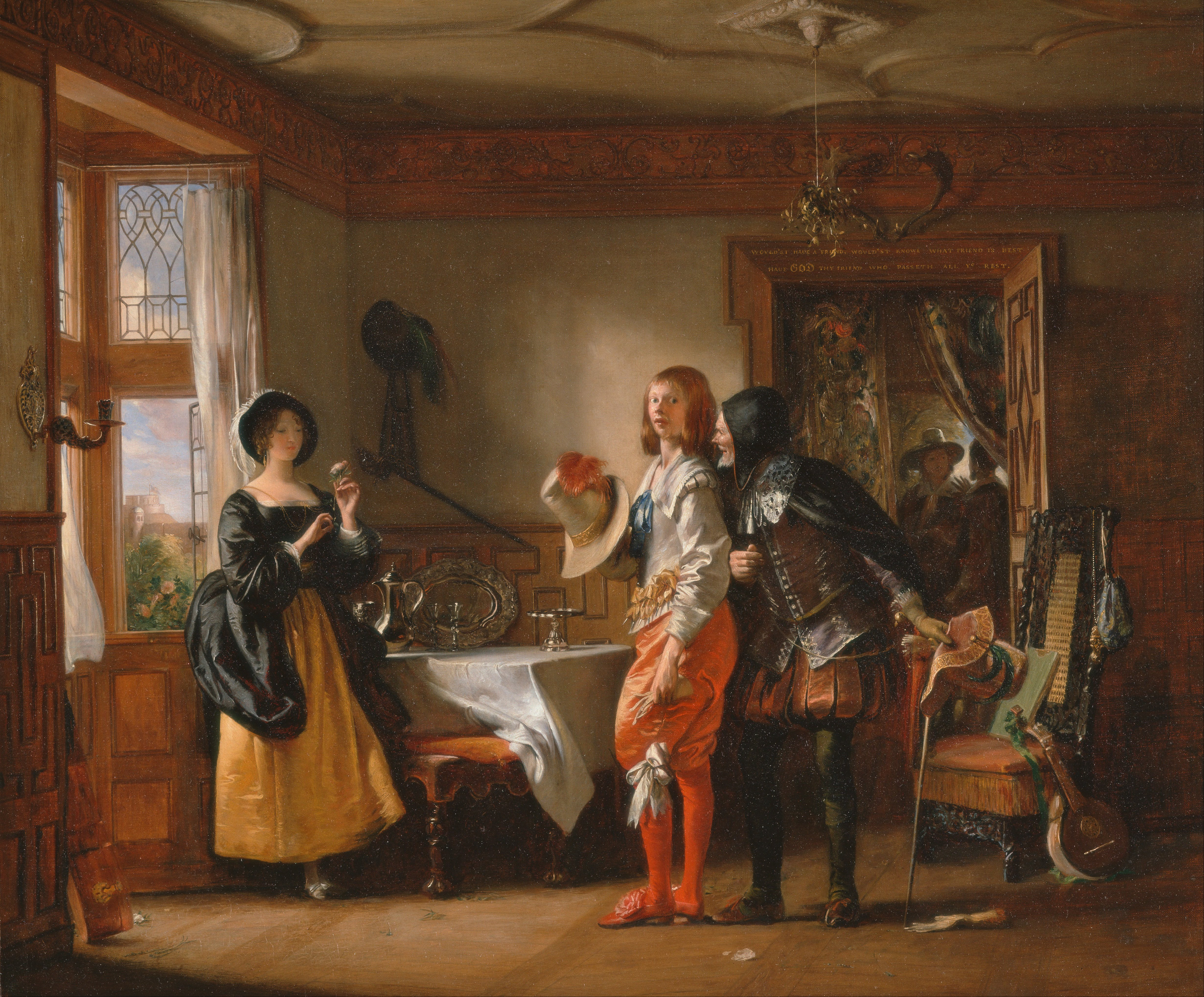
Shallow (right) tries to push forward the timid Slender to talk to Anne Page, painting by Charles Robert Leslie

Shallow appears at the beginning of the play to complain that Falstaff has been poaching deer from his land, has broken into a lodge and has assaulted his servants. After Falstaff brazenly admits his actions, Shallow threatens to prosecute him, but Falstaff just dares him to try. Shallow's young cousin Abraham Slender adds that he was robbed by Falstaff's cronies Bardolph, Nym and Pistol: "They carried me to the tavern and made me drunk, and afterward picked my pocket". They all deny it in extravagant terms.

Shallow is advised to take his mind off the matter by promoting the marriage of Slender to Anne Page, daughter of the well-off Thomas Page, who approves the match. For most of the rest of the play, Shallow simply encourages the oafish Slender's clumsy attempts to woo Anne.

== Character role ==
G. Beiner argues Shallow's self-deceiving vanity provides a kind of "comic justification" for Falstaff's exploitation of him, since we feel more sympathy for "clever knave than a foolish citizen". In the Merry Wives Shallow is set up at the beginning as an impotent foil to the brazen and confident Falstaff, only to prepare the way for a reversal in which Falstaff himself is utterly outwitted and humiliated. Daniel Kornstein says that in Henry IV, Part 2 Shallow is set up as the antithesis of the firm and incorruptible Lord Chief Justice, who is never deceived by Falstaff: the "contrast between the Lord Chief Justice and Shallow could not be greater". Shallow lives up to his name and is a "stupid gullible liar".

Critics have noted that Shakespeare gives Shallow a distinct style of speech, characterised by constant repetition with slight variation. A. R. Humphries described it as "babbling incoherence". Thus in Henry IV, Part 2 he says to Falstaff, "I will not excuse you. You shall not be excused. Excuses shall not be admitted. There is no excuse shall serve. You shall not be excused.—". Both the pathos and the comedy of the character derive from the contrast between the aged Shallow and the lusty, riotous figure he imagines himself to have been in his youth. Anthony Nuttall connects this to a much wider sense of the loss of a perhaps mythical ideal past that runs through the Henriad plays.

== Real-life inspirations ==
=== Thomas Lucy ===
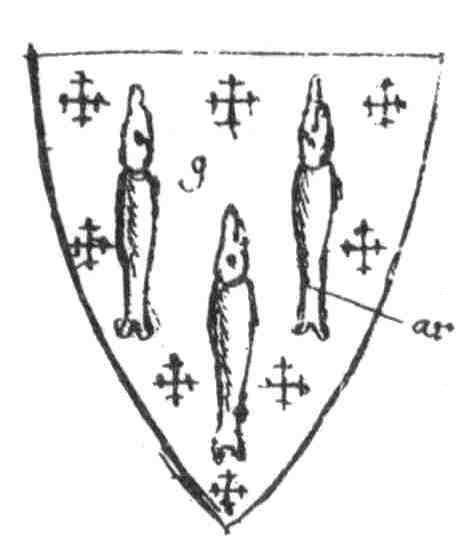
Thomas Lucy's coat of arms, depicting "luces" (pike), from William Dugdale's Antiquities of Warwickshire

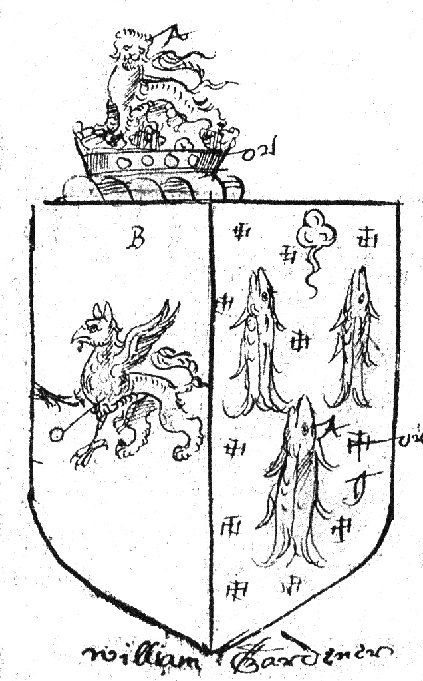
Gardiner's coat of arms, incorporating his wife's family arms at the right

It has been speculated that Shallow, at least as portrayed in The Merry Wives of Windsor, is a parody of Sir Thomas Lucy, a local landowner in Charlecote, near Stratford upon Avon, with whom Shakespeare is supposed to have had conflicts when he was young. Nicholas Rowe records a story that the young Shakespeare was prosecuted for poaching deer from Lucy's land. This corresponds to the accusation Shallow makes against Falstaff, but finds himself unable to follow up. The play also appears to contain a pun on the name "Lucy", similar to a ballad that circulated in Stratford, in which Lucy's name was altered to "lousy". When Shallow and his dim-witted relative Slender discuss their family coat of arms, they mention that it depicted "luces" (pike). Their family symbols unintentionally become literally lice-ridden when this is misinterpreted as a "dozen white louses". Thomas Lucy's coat of arms contained "luces".

The theory that Shallow was a joke at Lucy's expense dates back to c.1688, when Archdeacon Richard Davies wrote that Shakespeare was "much given to all unluckiness in stealing venison and Rabbits particularly from Sr. Lucy,. . . his revenge is so great that he [Lucy] is his Justice Clodpate, and calls him a great man and that in allusion to his name bore three louses rampant for his Arms".

=== William Gardiner ===
Leslie Hotson in his 1931 book Shakespeare versus Shallow argues that Shallow is a parody of William Gardiner (1531–97), a corrupt Justice of the Peace who had a long-running feud with the owner of the Swan theatre, Francis Langley. Shakespeare had been drawn into this feud and had even had a writ of attachment, a form of restraining order, taken out against him by Gardiner's stepson. Hotson argues that the joke about the "luces" in Shallow's coat of arms refers to Gardiner's wife, Frances Luce, whose family coat of arms bearing luces was incorporated into Gardiner's. Hotson says, "Could this be the true significance of the coat of arms passage in the Merry Wives? Was the Justice Shallow of the play a caricature of Justice Gardiner?" Hotson proceeds to argue that most of Shallow's actions in the plays satirise corrupt deals in which Gardiner was involved, and that the dim-witted Slender is a parody of Gardiner's stepson, William Wayte, who was mercilessly exploited by Gardiner.

=== Criticisms ===
Other critics have argued that Shallow comes from a long theatrical tradition of depicting bumbling old men, derived ultimately from the Roman stock character of the senex amans. Samuel Schoenbaum says that a direct parody of Lucy is unlikely. Why should Shakespeare risk offending "well placed friends of a man who had done the state some service"? The fact that the evidence for the alleged parody of Lucy is confined to the Merry Wives suggests that the character was not invented as parody of Lucy, though Shakespeare may have remembered the luces/louses joke from his Stratford days. Certainly "Lucy was, in physical form, social condition and personality, nothing like Shallow". Nevertheless, even if the character of Shallow in Henry IV, Part 2 was not invented as a parody of either Lucy or Gardiner, it may have been adapted in the Merry Wives to become one. Peter Quennell argues that the portrayal of Shallow probably drew on both Lucy and Gardiner.

== In other literature ==
Shallow appears along with Falstaff's other cronies in the play Falstaff's Wedding (1766), a comedy by William Kenrick, which is set in the period between the end of Henry IV, Part 2 and the beginning of Henry V. A subplot involves Mistress Quickly and Doll Tearsheet disguising themselves as gentlewomen to find rich husbands, targeting Shallow and Slender. Quickly intends to marry Shallow, and Doll to marry Slender. The plan appears to succeed, but Shallow and Slender find out their true identities and switch places at the weddings with Ancient Pistol and Corporal Nym, so Quickly ends up married to Pistol and Doll is married to Nym.

James White's book Falstaff's Letters purports to be letters written by Falstaff and his friends. It includes an affidavit deposited before Shallow about Falstaff's misdeeds, and letters between him and his servant Davy.
