= Corporal Nym =

Character in The Merry Wives of Windsor and Henry V

- Henriad character
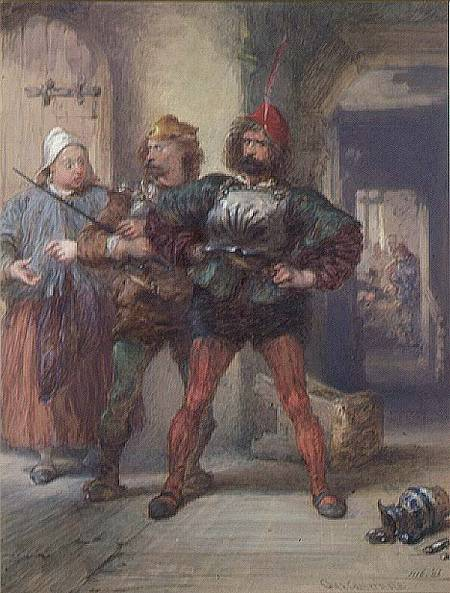
- Mistress Quickly, Nym and Pistol, painting by Charles Cattermole
- First appearance: The Merry Wives of Windsor
- Last appearance: Henry V
- Created by: William Shakespeare

In-universe information
- Gender: Male
- Occupation: Soldier; thief
- Religion: Christian
- Nationality: English

Corporal Nym is a fictional character who appears in two Shakespeare plays, The Merry Wives of Windsor and Henry V. He later appears in spin-off works by other writers. Nym is a soldier and criminal follower of Sir John Falstaff and a friend and rival of Ancient Pistol.

== In the plays ==
In The Merry Wives of Windsor Nym is one of Falstaff's servants along with Pistol. He and Pistol refuse to assist Falstaff's plan to seduce both Mistress Ford and Mistress Page, considering it beneath them. He informs Page and Ford that Falstaff "loves" their wives.

In Henry V we learn that Nym has been courting Mistress Quickly. He gets into an argument with Pistol when he learns that she has married Pistol. Pistol tells him to find prostitute Doll Tearsheet and marry her. Bardolph reconciles the two. The three of them join Henry's army, hoping to profit by looting in France. We later learn that Nym has been hanged for looting.

== Role ==
Nym's name is probably derived from the English word "nim", meaning "to take" (related to nimble and the game Nim), referring to his propensity for thieving.

Nym's extremely curt and disconnected style of speech contrasts with Pistol's expansive bombast, which is full of florid grandiosity and garbled intellectual references. In contrast, Nym explains everything by his "humour", meaning his mood or inclination, which suggests that his character was designed as a parody of Ben Jonson's "comedy of humours". According to Gail Paster, Nym uses his "humour" to justify his behaviour, as a rationale for unprovoked "impulsiveness and aggressiveness". Nym's laconic and sometime gnomic utterances are explained by the Boy in Henry V as a result of a confused idea that terse speech makes a man seem serious,

For Nym, he hath heard that men of few words are the best men, and therefore he scorns to say his prayers, lest 'a should be thought a coward; but his few bad words are matched with as few good deeds, for 'a never broke any man's head but his own, and that was against a post when he was drunk.

A notable example of Nym's speech patterns occurs when Nym informs Master Page of Falstaff's plan to seduce his wife; he manages to be both curt and pointlessly repetitive, with additional obscure assertions:

He loves your wife. There's the short and long. My name is Corporal Nym. I speak and I avouch. T'is true: my name is Nym, and Falstaff loves your wife. Adieu. I love not the humour of bread and cheese and there's the humour of it.

== In other literature ==
Nym plays a major role in William Kenrick's play Falstaff's Wedding (1766 version), in which he plots with Pistol to deceive Justice Shallow and Abraham Slender (from Merry Wives) to marry the disguised Mistress Quickly and Doll Tearsheet respectively. Shallow discovers the plot. He and Slender switch places with Nym and Pistol, who end up married to Quickly and Doll, as is implied in Henry V.

James White's book Falstaff's Letters (1796) purports to be a collection of letters written by Falstaff and his cronies, found in an archive owned by a descendant of Mistress Quickly's sister. A letter from Pistol to Falstaff says that "the Nym is a pauper vile - I do retort - hath not utterance to woo his dog to bite at badger". A letter jointly signed by Nym and Pistol is written in a conflation of their different styles.

In Vaughan Williams' opera, Sir John in Love the role is sung by a baritone.

== Film and television ==
- On film, in the acclaimed 1944 Laurence Olivier version of Henry V, Nym was played by Frederick Cooper. In that version his execution was neither mentioned or shown, as the British public much needed a boost in morale from World War II, and Olivier felt Henry needed a more chivalrous depiction.
- In the 1964 film Falstaff aka Chimes at Midnight, although it was primarily Orson Welles' take on Henry IV, in which Nym did not appear, a couple of his scenes from Henry V were interpolated, in which he was played by an uncredited actor.
- In the 1989 Kenneth Branagh version he was played by Geoffrey Hutchings and in that version his death was shown, but not by hanging; instead he is killed by French soldiers while he and Pistol are robbing bodies of their fallen comrades during the Battle of Agincourt sequence.
- Three soldier characters in the film Cold Mountain are named Bardolph, Nym and Pistol.
- On television, in the 1960 series An Age of Kings which was a presentation of Shakespeare's history plays, Nym was played in the Henry V episodes by David Andrews.
- in the 1979 version of Henry V which was part of a series of BBC presentation of plays by Shakespeare, Nym was played by Jeffrey Holland, in which his execution was mentioned as in the play but not actually shown. In The Merry Wives of Windsor which followed during the 1982 season, he was played by Michael Robbins.
- In a taped 1989 stage performance of Henry V that was part of Michael Bogdanov/Michael Pennington's English Shakespeare Company's Wars of the Roses series, he was played by John Dougall. Again his execution is referenced but not shown.
- In the Henry V filmed as part of the 2012 Hollow Crown series, he was played by Tom Brooke.
