= Tewkesbury mustard =

Type of mustard

Tewkesbury mustard is a blend of mustard flour and grated horseradish root. The mustard was developed in the English town of Tewkesbury in Gloucestershire, and gained a certain reputation in the 17th century, becoming a staple condiment of the kitchens of the time.

== Mustard balls ==
Originally the mustard was prepared by grinding the mustard seeds into mustard flour, combining this with finely-grated horseradish (and sometimes herbs and spices), then forming the mixture into balls which were then dried to aid preservation. The mustard balls would then be transported and sold in this form.

To use the balls, they would be broken apart then mixed with a liquid such as water, vinegar, wine, ale, beer, cider or fruit juice to soften them and mixed to a thick, creamy consistency. Often a sweetener, such as honey, would be added.

The resulting mixture would then be used as a condiment just as mustard is used today, or as a cure for ailments.

== Today ==
At the time of the Tewkesbury Festival in 1971 (a major programme of events commemorating the 850th anniversary of the consecration of the Abbey and the 500th anniversary of the Battle of Tewkesbury), the mustard was recreated on a commercial basis from the original recipe. Handmade mustard using local ingredients can still be purchased in Tewkesbury. The mustard can still be bought in ball format and even covered in gold leaf. A local manufacturer, the Tewkesbury Mustard Company, sells mustard balls online.

== Figurative usage ==
Shakespeare mentions the mustard in Henry IV, Part 2, in which Falstaff has the line: “his wit's as thick as Tewkesbury Mustard” (Act 2, Scene 4, Line 244), describing the character of his friend Ned Poins.

There is some evidence that “Tewkesbury Mustard” came to be used as a euphemism for incendiary bombs in the 17th century, a usage referred to in David Hume's History of England, in which he describes the rumour that the Great Fire of London was started by foreign arsonists trained by Jesuits, "and the whole plan of operations was so concerted, that precautions were taken by the Jesuits to vary their measures, according to the variation of the wind. Fire-balls were familiarly called among them Teuxbury mustard pills". Robert Hugh Benson’s refers to this in his historical novel Oddfish!, which contains the text “Workmen, too, were set to search and dig everywhere for "Tewkesbury mustard-balls," as they were called—or fire-balls, with which it was thought that the Catholics would set London a-fire”. A similar line also appears in Alfred Marks' book Who Killed Sir Edmund Godfrey?.

Thomas Firminger Thiselton-Dyer in his book “The Folk-lore of Plants” (pub. 1889) gives evidence that the phrase “He looks as if he lived on Tewkesbury mustard” came to be used as slang in Gloucestershire for those "who always have a sad, severe, and terrific countenance".

== See also ==
- List of mustard brands
