= Falstaff's Wedding =

Play by William Kenrick (1760 and 1766)

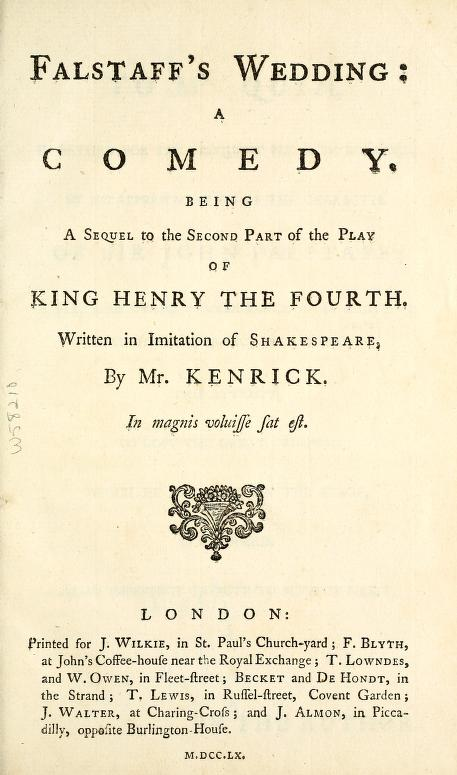
- Title page of the 1760 edition
- Original language: English
- Written by: William Kenrick
- Subject: Original version: Falstaff is drawn into a plot to kill Henry V Revised version: Falstaff and his cronies plot to marry into money
- Genre: Period piece; farce
- Setting: London, shortly after the coronation of King Henry V

Premiere
- Date: 1766
- Place: Drury Lane, London

Falstaff's Wedding (1760 and 1766) is a play by William Kenrick. It is a sequel to Shakespeare's plays Henry IV, Part 2 and The Merry Wives of Windsor. Most of the characters are carried over from the two Shakespeare plays. The play was first staged in 1766, but was not a success. It was infrequently revived thereafter.

The play exists in two quite different versions. The first version, published in 1760, is written in verse. Its main storyline involves an embittered Falstaff being drawn into a plot to kill Henry V of England. The second version, staged in 1766, drops the serious plot and expands the roles of the comic characters, becoming a farce about their plans to marry into money. It is mostly in prose with snatches of verse appended to the end of several scenes.

== First version ==
=== Characters ===
characters derived from The Merry Wives of Windsor are marked (MW); those from the Henry IV plays are marked (H.IV)

- King Henry V
- Duke of Gloucester
- Duke of Bedford
- Duke of Clarence
- Duke of York
- Duke of Exeter
- Archbishop of Canterbury
- The Pope's Legate
- Lord Scroop of Masham
- The Earl of Cambridge
- Sir Thomas Grey
- Mithridate, a Doctor
- Sir John Falstaff - (MW);(H.IV)
- Justice Shallow - (MW);(H.IV)
- Abraham Slender - (MW)
- Mr Pleadwell
- Friar Lawrence
- Friar Paul
- Ancient Pistol - (MW);(H.IV)
- Bardolph - (MW);(H.IV)
- Francis - (H.IV)
- Peto - (H.IV)
- Dame Ursula - (H.IV)
- Eleanor Poins - (H. IV)
- Mistress Quickly - (MW);(H.IV)
- Doll Tearsheet - (H.IV)

=== Plot ===
Smarting from his dismissal from Hal's presence, Falstaff meets up with Doll Tearsheet and Mistress Quickly, who have bribed their way free of jail. They are both shocked by what has happened. Lord Scroop and his accomplices plot against the new king. Scroop says that Henry's rejection of his old companions is proof of how hypocritical and untrustworthy he is. A Friar is asked to try to reform Falstaff. The Friar is told that the king's relationship with Poins' beautiful sister Eleanor has helped Poins escape the fate of the other former companions. The king has sent Eleanor to a nunnery, nominally to protect her. But he is disturbed to see her at his coronation.

Shallow plots to get back the thousand pounds he lent to Falstaff. In the Boar's Head Tavern, Falstaff pours out his bitterness to Bardolph. Shallow consults lawyer Mr. Pleadwell, but is advised that legal attempts to get his money will fail. Falstaff, Doll, Bardolph and Quickly discuss what they will do for the future. Scroop visits Eleanor Poins and attempts to seduce her, but she rejects him. An Apothecary visits the dejected Falstaff but can do nothing for him; Falstaff only perks up when Bardolph tells him that his old fiancée Mistress Ursula has inherited money. He writes to her, telling her of his enduring love. The king discusses challenges to his power from the church and the French. Ursula discusses Falstaff's intentions with her maid Bridget. The Friar confronts Falstaff about his lifestyle. Falstaff says marriage will be his penance.

The king angers church leaders when he refuses a demand from the Pope to change a law that requires parliamentary approval for some church financial matters. Scroop and the Papal Legate plot against him. Shallow, frustrated, determines to challenge Falstaff to a duel. Scroop and the Earl of Cambridge plan to kill Henry and place Edmund Mortimer on the throne. They think Falstaff is the man to do the deed, because of his known criminality and his grievance against Henry. Falstaff and Shallow meet for their duel. Falstaff beats Shallow, who is forced to concede he will never get back his money.

The Friar learns from Eleanor of Scroop's behaviour. Scroop appears. He attempts to rape Eleanor, but is overpowered by the friars. He leaves. The Friar reveals to Eleanor that he has discovered Scroop's plot against the king. Having agreed to kill the king, Falstaff waits for him at Southampton with the Earl of Cambridge. He ponders his options as, unaware of the plot, his new wife expresses excitement at the thought of meeting the king. The king hears from the friars about the plot, but remains unsure of the truth. He allows Falstaff an audience. Falstaff produces a knife, but then offers it to the king and tells him of the plot. The king leaves to find the conspirators. Alone Falstaff says that he knew the conspirators intended to hang him after he'd killed the king. The conspirators arrive, but deny their guilt. Proof of their plan arrives, and they are led away. The king returns Falstaff to his favour. Falstaff says he is too old to join in the French war, and wishes only to retire - as long as the king will give him some more money. The king agrees.

== Second version ==
=== Characters ===
characters derived from The Merry Wives of Windsor are marked (MW); those from the Henry IV plays are marked (H.IV)

- Sir John Falstaff - (MW);(H.IV)
- Justice Shallow - (MW);(H.IV)
- Abraham Slender - (MW)
- Mr Pleadwell
- Dr Caius - (MW)
- Friar Lawrence
- Ancient Pistol (MW);(H.IV)
- Bardolph - (MW);(H.IV)
- Corporal Nym - (MW)
- Gadshill - (H.IV)
- Officer
- Francis - (H.IV)
- Peto - (H.IV)
- Dame Ursula - (H.IV)
- Bridget (MW)
- Mistress Quickly - (MW);(H.IV)
- Doll Tearsheet - (H.IV)

=== Plot ===
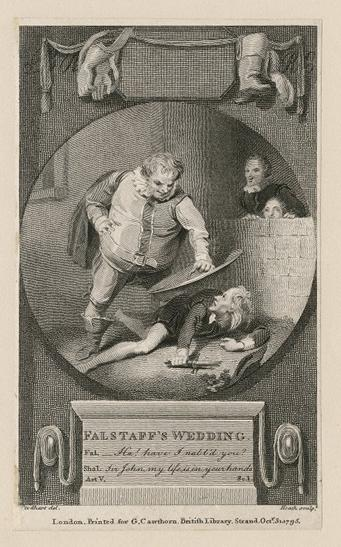
Falstaff overpowers Shallow, illustration by Stodhart, engraved by James Heath

Having been rejected by the new king Henry V, Falstaff and his cronies must find a new way to advance themselves. Doll Tearsheet and Mistress Quickly have bribed their way free of jail. Pistol tells Nym he intends to hide by using a false name. Falstaff still has the thousand pounds he borrowed from Shallow. Shallow consults Mr Pleadwell, a lawyer, about the money, but Pleadwell says that since no contract was drawn up for the loan, Shallow will have to rely on Falstaff's sense of honour. Shallow despairs of the money.

At a fencing school, Pistol and Nym meet Shallow and Slender. Disguised as Spanish swordsman "Anticho del Pistolo", Pistol impresses Shallow with his swordsmanship. Convinced that he can use "Pistolo" against Falstaff, Shallow invites him and Nym to work for him. Nym has an idea that they can trick Shallow and Slender into believing that Doll and Quickly are two well-known wealthy women, whom they resemble. The women will then pretend to fall in love with the two squires, knowing that the greedy Shallow and Slender will seize the chance to marry them.

Falstaff and Bardolph consult Dr Caius about Peto, who is very ill. Caius' track-record does not bode well for Peto. Bardolph informs Falstaff that Mistress Ursula, Falstaff's old fiancée, has come into money. Falstaff immediately plans to marry her at last. Doll and Quickly agree to Nym's plan. Meanwhile "Pistolo" sets out to woo Ursula for himself. Nym has already been pursuing her maid Bridget. Falstaff wins over Ursula, while Quickly and Doll adopt airs of demure gentility, convincing Shallow and Slender of their fake identities. Pistol attempts to impress Ursula, but is forced to flee when Falstaff approaches. A friar attempts to make Falstaff repent of his wayward ways with no success. Bardolph learns of Nym's deception plan. He informs Falstaff. Shallow challenges Falstaff to a duel, intending that "Pistolo" will do the fighting. Falstaff tries to get Bardolph to fight for him.

When neither "Pistolo" nor Bardolph are willing to fight, the two old men are forced to fight the duel themselves. Shallow repeatedly stabs Falstaff but fails to penetrate his body, breaking his sword. Falstaff captures Shallow. He agrees to release him if he will say they are quits. When Shallow agrees, Falstaff tells him about Nym's marriage plot. The pair devise a plan to outwit the plotters. Shortly afterwards Pistol receives a letter, apparently from Ursula, saying that she wants to marry him rather than Falstaff. Bridget will marry Nym. By contriving that the marriage will be at a masquerade, Shallow and Slender manage to switch places with Pistol and Nym, who marry Quickly and Doll. Falstaff marries Ursula. The deceptions are revealed. Pistol, Quickly, Doll and Nym accept their fate, and Falstaff invites everyone to the marriage feast.

== Creation and productions ==
Kenrick was a well known commentator on Shakespeare in the 18th century, who took the common view at the time that Shakespeare's plays were only acceptable to modern audiences in heavily adapted versions. Falstaff's Wedding contains very little directly derived from Shakespeare apart from a few phrases and the characters themselves. The ending of the second version, however, is a pastiche of the final scene of The Merry Wives of Windsor. The play was one of several adaptations of Shakespeare centring on the character of Falstaff, but is "the most remarkable" of them according to critic Adam Hansen. Hansen describes the first version of the play as "an ingenious exploitation of some hints and inconsistencies in the Shakespearean original". In particular Kenrick picks up on the hint that Hal has a relationship with Poins' sister, who is portrayed in Falstaff's Wedding as the king's "quondam mistress".

After the first version was published in 1760, Kenrick was encouraged to adapt it into a viable performance version. He wrote that,

The success, which a juvenile sketch of this Play hath met with in publication, having induced the Author to bring it on the stage; he flatters himself the alterations, which were thought necessary to accommodate it to a theatrical audience, will not give less satisfaction to the reader than such scenes as he was obliged on that account to reject.

The revised version is almost a completely different play. Eleanor Poins and all the upper class characters are dropped, including the conspirators. Only a minority of scenes remain unchanged. A wholly new story centring on Nym's plans for Doll and Quickly was created. Thus the earlier version, described as a sequel to Henry IV, Part 2, is mimicking the manner of the Henriad plays, but the second version is much more indebted to The Merry Wives of Windsor.

The original version of the play was dedicated to the best-known Falstaff of the era James Quin. When the revised version was performed in 1766, the title role was played by James Love, who was also a well-known Falstaff. It was performed the following year in Liverpool.

Though the revised version was not a success on stage, the original version was popular in print and widely reprinted. Kendrick later complained that David Garrick had tried to stop productions of the play. In his poem Roscius a character based on Garrick says of him "Ne'er shall his Falstaff come again to life".

== Significance ==
Though not a major success, the play was very significant in the process of expanding the imaginary world created in Shakespeare's Henry IV plays, especially by creating the characters of Eleanor Poins and Mistress Ursula, both of whom are only mentioned in passing in the original. David A. Brewer refers to this as "detachability with a vengeance", in which characters take on a life of their own detached from the original dramatic context. The play represents Falstaff's cronies breaking out of their restricted roles.

The play was an influence on James White's Falstaff's Letters (1796), originally entitled Original Letters, etc, of Sir John Falstaff and his friends. White's friend Charles Lamb considered it to be "full of goodly quips and rare fancies, 'all deftly masked like hoar antiquity'—much superior to Dr. Kenrick's Falstaff 's Wedding." He published a review of the book in The Critical Review in which he criticised Kenrick because "the peculiar quaintness of the character [of Falstaff] was lost by being sunk in modern wit", a defect supposedly avoided in White's book.
