= Mistress Quickly =

Character in several history plays by Shakespeare

Eleanor Quickly
- Henriad character
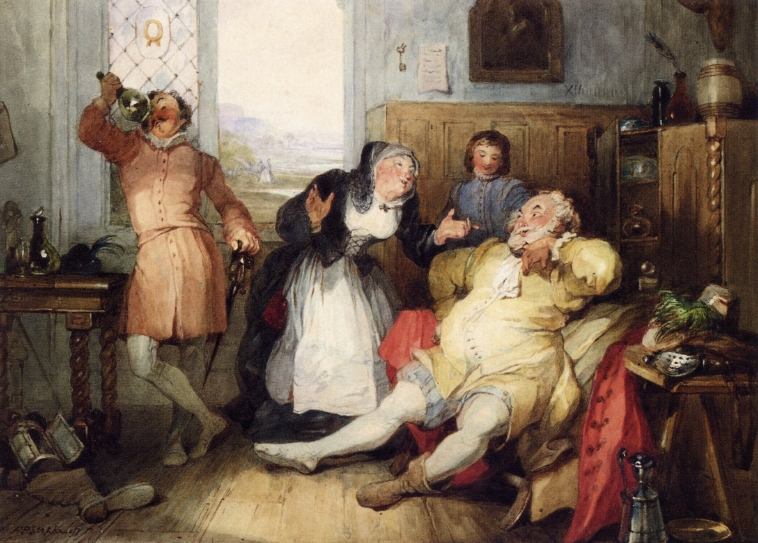
- Falstaff and Mistress Quickly from The Merry Wives of Windsor, Francis Philip Stephanoff, c. 1840
- First appearance: Henry IV, part I
- Last appearance: Henry V
- Created by: William Shakespeare

In-universe information
- Nickname: Nell
- Occupation: Innkeeper
- Religion: Christian
- Nationality: English

Mistress Nell Quickly is a fictional character who appears in several plays by William Shakespeare. She is an inn-keeper, who runs the Boar's Head Tavern, at which Sir John Falstaff and his disreputable cronies congregate.

The character appears in four plays: Henry IV, Part 1, Henry IV, Part 2, Henry V and The Merry Wives of Windsor.

== Character and role ==
In all the plays Quickly is characterised as a woman with strong links to the criminal underworld, but who is nevertheless preoccupied with her own respectable reputation. Her speech is filled with malapropisms, double entendres and "bawdy innuendo".

Her name may be a pun on "quick lay", though "quick" also had the meaning of "alive", so it may imply "lively", which also commonly had a sexual connotation. Quickly's character is most fully developed in Henry IV, Part 2 in which her contradictory aspirations to gentility and barely concealed vulgarity are brought out in her language. According to James C. Bulman, she "unwittingly reveals her sexual history" by her blithe malapropisms and "her character is both defined and undone by her absurdly original speech".

Though her age is not specified, the comment that she is "pistol proof" has been interpreted to mean that she is past childbearing age, and she says she has known Falstaff for 29 years.

=== Role in the plays ===
In Henry IV, Part 1, Mistress Quickly is described as the proprietor of the Boar's Head Tavern in the London neighbourhood of Eastcheap. She is married, as Prince Hal asks after her husband, referring to him as "an honest man"; he does not appear in the play. She participates in the mock-court scene in which Falstaff pretends to be the king.

In Henry IV, Part 2, she asks the authorities to arrest Falstaff, accusing him of running up excessive debts and making a fraudulent proposal of marriage to her (implying that she is now a widow). Mistress Quickly has a friendship of long standing with Doll Tearsheet, a prostitute who frequents the tavern, and protects her against aggressive men she calls "swaggerers". At the end of that play, Mistress Quickly and Doll Tearsheet are arrested in connection with the beating to death of a man by Ancient Pistol.

In The Merry Wives of Windsor she works as nurse to Caius, a French physician, but primarily acts as a messenger between other characters, communicating love notes in a plot largely concerned with misdirected letters. At the end she takes the role of the queen of the fairies in the practical joke played on Falstaff.

In Henry V, she is referred to as Nell Quickly. She is with Falstaff at his deathbed, and describes his death to his friends. She marries Falstaff's ensign, Ancient Pistol, despite having previously been engaged to Corporal Nym. While Pistol is away in France, he receives a letter from which he learns that "my Doll is dead", having succumbed to the "malady of France" (syphilis). Many editors take the name Doll to be a misprint for "Nell", but it has also been interpreted as a reference to Doll Tearsheet rather than Quickly.

=== Continuity issues ===
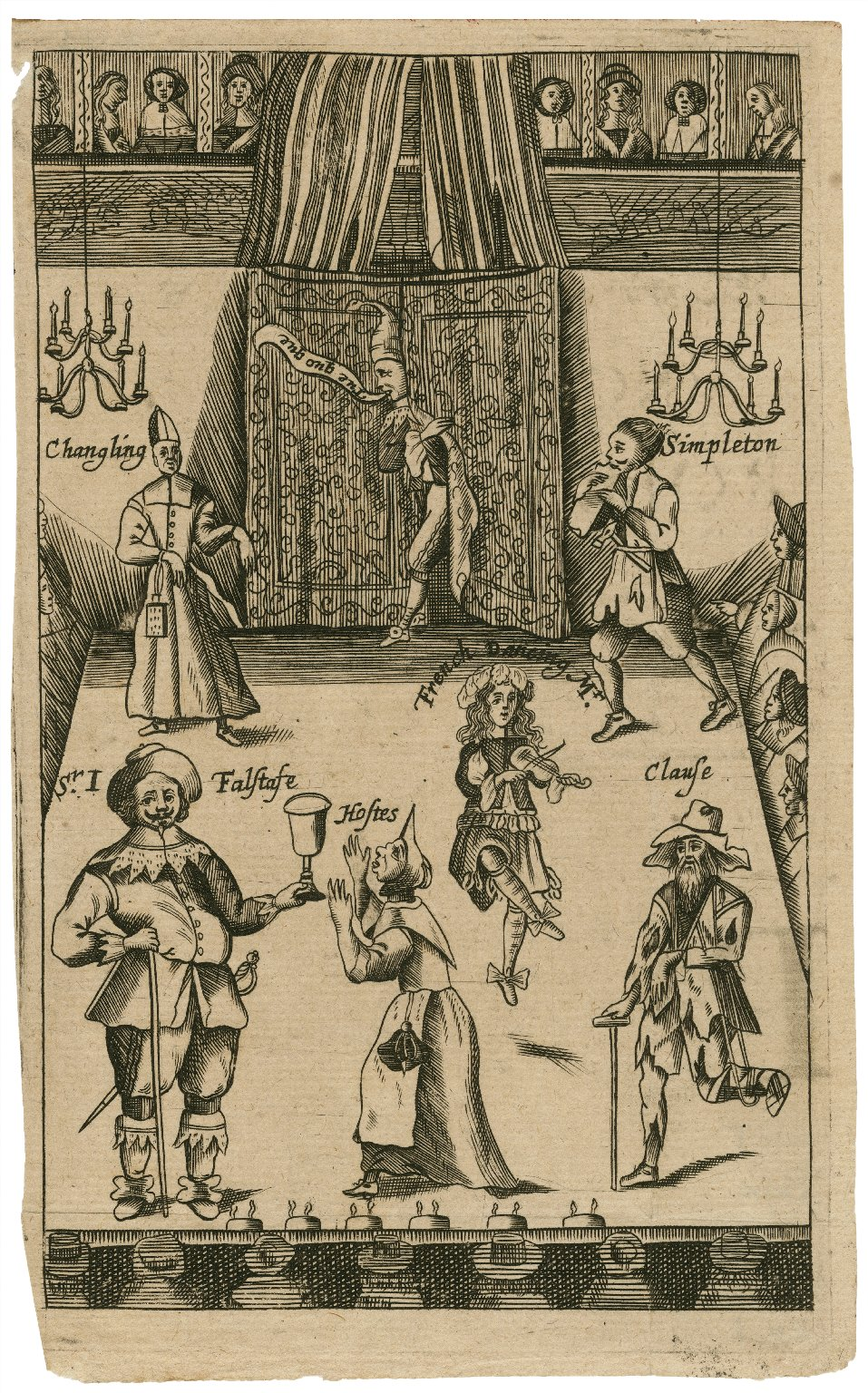
The earliest depiction of Mistress Quickly (labelled "hostes[s]") with Falstaff, in a print from 1662 that depicts popular stage characters of the time

Quickly's role in The Merry Wives is sufficiently different from her role in the other plays that some critics have suggested that she cannot be the same character. Nothing suggests that she already knows Falstaff (or Bardolph, or Pistol), and there is no explanation of how she comes to be working for Dr. Caius. However, there are also many other continuity problems with other characters in the play. For example, the play is set at an unspecified period in the reign of Henry IV, but Shallow is feuding with Falstaff from the beginning, even though in the Henriad plays he only realises his mistake in trusting him after Henry V is crowned. These oddities may have arisen because the play was written rapidly for a specific occasion. There are some signs of attempts to make the events fit the action of the Henriad plays, for example the brief scene in which Pistol expresses his attraction to her and says "she is my prize". This fits with his marriage to her in Henry V. There is no further reference to his pursuit of her in the play, but he plays the part of her consort in the fairy masque at the end.

There are similar, less glaring problems with the Henriad plays. In Henry IV, Part 1 she is evidently a married innkeeper. No reference is made to the death of her husband in Part 2, just that Falstaff promises to marry her. Likewise, the tavern seems to evolve into a reputed brothel by the beginning of Henry V.

== In other literature ==
Mistress Quickly appears along with Falstaff's other cronies in the play Falstaff's Wedding (1766), a comedy by William Kenrick, which is set in the period between the end of Henry IV, Part 2 and the beginning of Henry V. Mistress Quickly and Doll Tearsheet, having bribed their way out of prison, appear in the first act explaining to Falstaff how they were arrested. They later plot to disguise themselves as gentlewomen to find rich husbands, targeting Robert Shallow and his young cousin Abraham Slender. Quickly intends to marry Shallow, and Doll to marry Slender. The plan appears to succeed, but Shallow and Slender find out their true identities and switch places at the weddings with Ancient Pistol and Corporal Nym, so she ends up married to Pistol, as in Henry V.

James White's book Falstaff's Letters (1796) purports to be a collection of letters written by Falstaff and his associates, provided by a descendant of Mistress Quickly's sister. She had inherited them from Mistress Quickly herself, who kept them in drawer in the Boar's Head Tavern until her death in "August 1419". The collection includes letters written by Mistress Quickly to Falstaff complaining of his behaviour.

"Dame Quickly" (in the English edition) is also referenced as "Widow Quickly" (in the second German edition) and as "Falstaff's friend, the Lively Widow" (in the French edition) in Chapter 1, Section 3 of Karl Marx's Capital.
