= Valetta Iacopi =

British operatic singer (1904–1977)

Iacopi in 1945

Valetta Cecilia Iacopi (28 March 1904 – 9 November 1977) was a British operatic singer of the mid-20th century, sometimes billed as a mezzo-soprano and sometimes as a contralto. Among her many operatic roles was Mrs Sedley in Peter Grimes, which she created in 1945.

== Life and career ==
Iacopi was born in Gatehead in north-east England, the second daughter and youngest of five children of Charles Austin Iacopi and his wife Juliett. She studied at the Royal Academy of Music, graduating in 1927. As a student she played the title role in Carmen, Delilah in Saint-Saëns's Samson and Delilah and Fricka in Wagner's Die Walküre at the Scala Theatre.

She became a leading member of the Sadler's Wells Opera Company, which she joined in 1934. The outbreak of the Second World War prevented Iacopi from going to Italy to sing Azucena in Il trovatore and Amneris in Aida under Tullio Serafin and she remained with the Sadler's Wells company. During the war the theatre was in use as a refuge for people made homeless by air-raids, and the opera company toured nationally. Its return to its home in 1945 was marked by the premiere of Benjamin Britten's opera Peter Grimes, in which Iacopi created the role of the troublemaking Mrs Sedley.

Iacopi's other operatic roles included the Witch in Hansel and Gretel, Mistress Quickly in both Falstaff and Sir John in Love, Azucena in Il trovatore, Orlovsky in Die Fledermaus, Magdalena in Die Meistersinger, Suzuki in Madam Butterfly, Flora in La traviata, Marcellina in The Marriage of Figaro and The Barber of Seville, Annina in Der Rosenkavalier and Waltraute in Die Walküre, At the Royal Opera House she appeared as Mrs Sedley (1948), the nurse in Boris Godunov (1948, 1949 and 1952) and Schwertleite in Die Walküre (1948 and 1954 to 1956).

In concert she sang the title role in Carmen. Other concert appearances were as mezzo soloist with the Royal Choral Society, conducted by Sir Malcolm Sargent, in Verdi's Requiem and Honegger's King David.

Iacopi married the tenor Ronald Hill in 1946. After retiring from performance she taught singing at the Cardiff College of Music and Drama. She died at her home in Wales on 9 November 1977 after a long illness.

== Sources ==
- Gilbert, Susie (2009). Opera for Everybody: The Story of English National Opera. London: Faber and Faber. ISBN 978-0-571-22493-7.
- Herbert, David, ed. (1989). The Operas of Benjamin Britten. London: Herbert Press. ISBN 978-1-871569-08-7.
- Kennedy, Michael (1964). The Works of Ralph Vaughan Williams. London: Oxford University Press. OCLC 602665.
