= Bardolph (Shakespeare character) =

Fictional character

- Henriad character
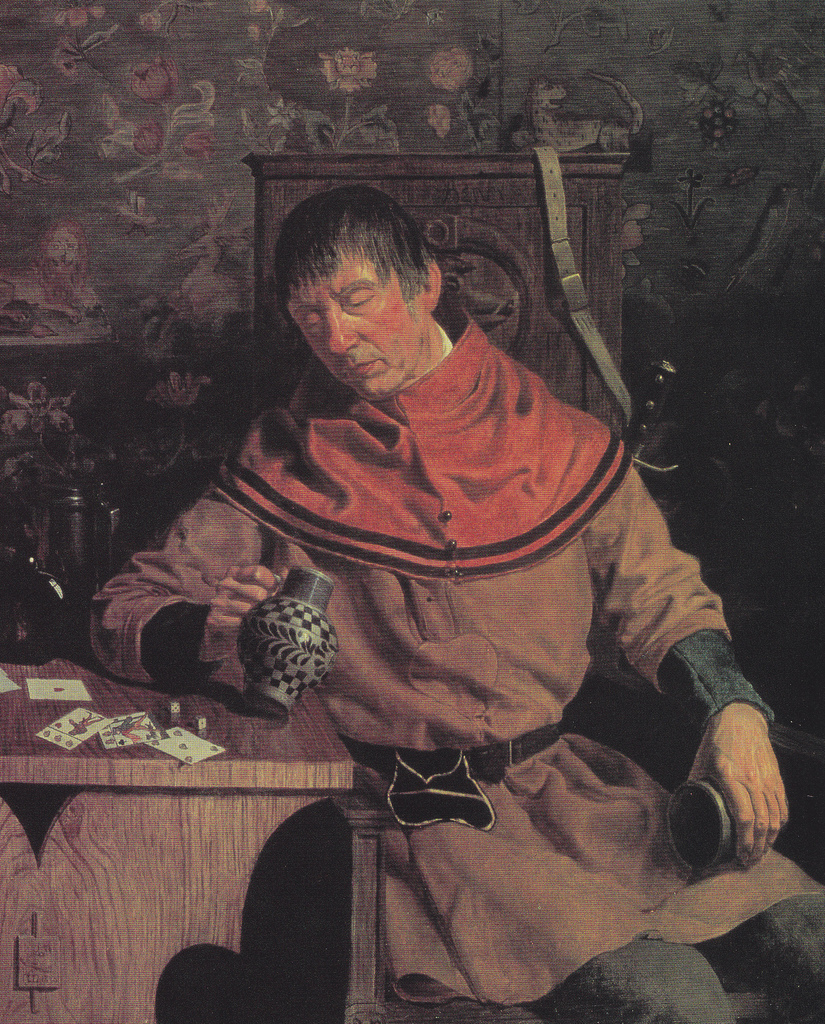
- Bardolph as imagined by Henry Stacy Marks
- First appearance: Henry IV, Part 1 (c. 1597)
- Last appearance: Henry V (c. 1599)
- Created by: William Shakespeare

In-universe information
- Aliases: Rossill, Sir John Russel, Bardoll
- Gender: male
- Occupation: thief; soldier
- Religion: Christian
- Nationality: English

Bardolph is a fictional character who appears in four plays by William Shakespeare. He is a thief who forms part of the entourage of Sir John Falstaff. His grossly inflamed nose and constantly flushed, carbuncle-covered face is a repeated subject for Falstaff's and Prince Hal's comic insults and word-play. Though his role in each play is minor, he often adds comic relief, and helps illustrate the personality change in Henry from Prince to King.

In early published versions of Henry IV, Part 1, the character is called Rossill or Sir John Russel. Shakespeare renamed the character to avoid suggestions that he was ridiculing the then-prominent Russell family, which included the Earls of Bedford. Bardolph is thought to be named after Thomas Bardolf, 5th Baron Bardolf (d. 1408), one of the rebels affiliated with the insurrection of Henry Percy, 1st Earl of Northumberland.

In Henry V, Bardolph participates in the war (the Hundred Years' War) and is good friends with Pistol and Nym. By this stage he has been promoted to the rank of lieutenant. After the fall of Harfleur (1415), he is charged with looting, having been discovered stealing from a church in the conquered French town. He is sentenced to punishment of death by hanging. In a focal point of Henry V, King Henry, despite being friends with Bardolph in his youth, remorselessly agrees to his punishment and has him hanged.

== Merry Wives of Windsor ==
Bardolph appears in The Merry Wives of Windsor as one of Falstaff's associates along with Nym and Pistol again, though his role is minor. Abraham Slender accuses him and the others of getting him drunk and then robbing him after he passed out. They all deny it.

Later, Bardolph is dismissed by Falstaff because of his inadequate thieving skills ("his filching was like an unskilful singer; he kept not time.") The host of the local inn gives him a job as a tapster (bartender). Pistol and Nym consider this absurd, since Bardolph is a drunk from a family of drunks. They say his parents even conceived him when they were drunk. Bardolph later tells the Host of the inn that some German guests need to borrow horses. Bardolph goes with them, but soon returns saying the Germans have galloped away on the horses.

== Character ==
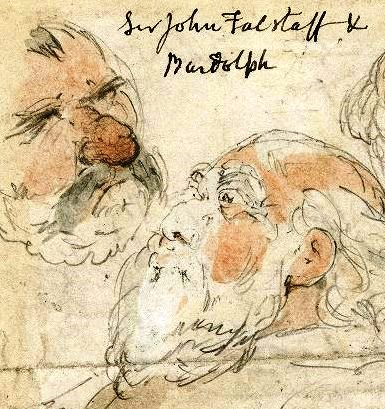
Sir John Falstaff and Bardolph by George Cruikshank

Bardolph is continually compared to both an angel and a devil. He is Falstaff's loyal and constant companion, functioning as a form of demonic guardian angel, who reminds Falstaff of the mouth of hell to which he may be destined. Bardolph himself is willing to follow him there. As Harold Bloom says, "Bardolph, the butt of many of his jokes, want[s] to be with him whether he is in heaven or hell (2.3.7–8); for Bardolph the jests of Falstaff cast out even the fear of hell. Yet Bardolph has reason to know otherwise. Falstaff looked at Bardolph, but he did not see Bardolph, he saw souls burning in hell."

The hell imagery becomes stronger in Henry V when after Falstaff's death the page boy remembers him making a black joke about a flea: "a [he] saw a flea sticking on Bardolph's nose and a said it was a black soul burning in hellfire". Before Bardolph's execution he is described by Fluellen as a barely-human unstable eruption of noxious forces: "his face is all bubukles, and whelks, and knobs, and flames o' fire: and his lips blows at his nose, and it is like a coal of fire, sometimes plue [blue] and sometimes red; but his nose is executed, and his fire's out".

Bardolph's character in the King Henry series symbolises the change in Henry from a troublesome youth to a determined leader. Bardolph's execution is based on a real incident. A soldier, whose name is not known yet, was hanged during the campaign in France for robbing a church.

== Name ==
Bardolph shares his name with the historical Lord Bardolph, who appears in the opening scene of Henry IV, Part 2 as one of the supporters of the Percy rebellions. Lord Bardolph thus plays a similar role in the disruptive "high politics" of the play, paralleling the fictional criminal Bardolph's role as a supporting figure in the disruption of law and order among the "low" characters. According to René Weis, "In the context of the play's opposing a crumbling main plot in its final throes to an equally collapsing low plot, the two Bardolphs pose similar threats to the welfare of the kingdom, through high treason and corruption of the heir to the throne respectively." Some commentators nevertheless have found the choice of the name puzzling, since having two characters in the same play with the same name is potentially confusing for the audience. Weis argues that Bardolph's distinctive appearance would be enough to avoid confusion.

In the earliest published version of Henry IV, Part I, the 1598 quarto, he is called "Rossill" (an archaic spelling of the name Russell) and is at one point specified as "sir Iohn Russel". This is generally taken to mean that he originally had that name in the first performances of the play, just as Falstaff too had originally been given another name: Sir John Oldcastle. Shakespeare may have changed the name when he was forced to change Oldcastle to Falstaff after complaints from the Oldcastle family. It is possible he decided to remove any suggestion that he was ridiculing the Russell family (which included William Russell, 1st Baron Russell of Thornhaugh and Edward Russell, 3rd Earl of Bedford), and so used the name of the rebel.

Since the character originally appears to have been a knight (both the Norman-French names "Russell" and "Bardolph" imply knightly status), this suggests that Shakespeare was following closely his source The Famous Victories of Henry V in which Prince Hal's disreputable companions are unruly knights rather than vagabonds. However Bardolph is clearly identified as a mere servant of Falstaff's in Henry IV, Part 2, something that is not explicit in Part 1. In Part 2 Bardolph seems to copy the role of Hal's criminal servant "Cuthbert Cutter" in Famous Victories when the Lord Chief Justice is referred to as "the nobleman that committed the Prince for striking him about Bardolph". This recalls a scene in Famous Victories when Hal assaults the Lord Chief Justice for arresting and intending to hang Cutter for theft. The name Bardolph therefore seems to have been deliberately chosen specifically for Henry IV, Part 2 to parallel Lord Bardolph at a low-class level. His servant-class status is confirmed in the Merry Wives by his job as a tapster.

== Nose ==
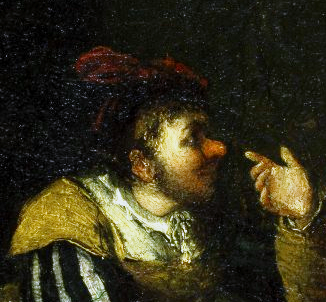
Falstaff Mocking Bardolph's Nose (detail of a painting by John Cawse)

Bardolph's distinguishing feature, his inflamed nose ("that salamander of yours"), has led to some debate, and has affected the way the character is portrayed in productions. The portrayal of the condition ranges from basic rosacea to rhinophyma. The idea that a ruddy face and red nose is associated with excessive drinking has a long history. However, Fluellen's reference to Bardolph's whole face being covered with abnormal growths suggests an extensive skin condition. It is possible that Fluellen's word "bubuckles" is a portmanteau of "carbuncles" and "bubos", implying swellings produced by syphilis.

Various comic explanations are given for Bardolph's face. Prince Hal imagines that he blushed when he was caught stealing his first alcoholic drink and the blush stuck. Falstaff says it is a providentially ordained lamp to lead them in the dark on their criminal enterprises. Bardolph himself claims that his flushed appearance comes from "choler", a reference to the theory of the four humours, according to which a choleric temperament denotes courage.

=== In literature ===
Bardolph's fiery nose became a reference point in later literature. An anonymous poem satirising the Whig party included the line, "Fat Whigs, whose noses gilded well with wine,/ Like Bardolph's famed proboscis swell and shine". George Daniel's Merrie England in the Olden Time includes a verse with the line "Here honest Sir John took his ease at his inn / Bardolph's proboscis, and Jack's double chin." In 1831, a humorous article on the "Genius and Poetry of the Nose" in Edward Moxon's The Englishman's Magazine stated that "the celebrity of Bardolph's nose will endure as long as the name of the mighty bard himself", going on to complain that scholars had not devoted effort to the "erudite illustration and exposition of Bardolph's extraordinary feature". Bardolph's lamp-like nose consumed no oil, but derived its vital power from the "pure spirits that presided over Bardolph's potations". In Robert Nye's novel Falstaff (1976) the eponymous narrator says "there never was a nose that came near to the nose of my man Bardolph. Not for brilliance, refulgor or resplendence...It was not a nose, it was phosphorous."

== References in other works ==
Bardolph appears along with Falstaff's other cronies in Falstaff's Wedding (1766), a play by William Kenrick, which is set after the events of Henry IV, Part 2.

In Robert Brough's novel The Life of Sir John Falstaff (1858), a fictional autobiography of the knight, it is revealed that Bardolph's real name is Peter, and that Bardolph is a nickname derived from "a fancied resemblance to a nobleman at the court" (i.e. Lord Bardolph). Peter "took kindly to the name" to such an extent that he eventually believed that he was a member of the aristocratic family. Bardolph's supposed coat of arms is "a bottle gules, on an oak table proper, with a corkscrew trenchant, supported by thirst rampant".

In A. M. F Randolph's fantasy The Trial of Sir John Falstaff (1893), Falstaff is brought to trial, with Justice Shallow presiding. Bardolph is called as a witness, but refuses to say anything. The light from the window strikes his nose, creating such an intense reflection that the whole court is temporarily blinded. Bardolph is cited for contempt of court.

In Nye's novel Falstaff Bardoph tells Falstaff that his mother was Tannakin Skinker, the famous pig-faced woman. His family were originally wealthy burghers from the Netherlands, but were shamed when a gypsy curse led his grandmother to give birth to a pig-faced child. They kept the child secret, but when she reached adulthood, they moved to England to consult Roger Bacon, who informed them that only vigorous sex would cure their daughter's facial deformity. They advertised for a partner, who had to have sex with her through a partition. The cure worked and the couple were married. She gave birth to Bardolph, but her husband killed himself when, as a side-effect of the cure, his penis shrank to the size and shape of a pig's tail. Bardolph inherited the tendency to nasal abnormality.

Bardolph appears in several operatic works. In Salieri's Falstaff the role is for a baritone. As "Bardolfo" he appears in Verdi's Falstaff. He also appears in Vaughan Williams' opera Sir John in Love. In both of these the role is for a tenor. In Holst's At the Boar's Head the role is for a baritone.

Bardolph comments on various events, factions, and characters in Jason Sholtis's Dungeons & Dragons adventure Operation Unfathomable.

== Screen portrayals ==
- On film, in the 1944 Laurence Olivier version of Henry V, Bardolph was played by Roy Emerton. In that version, because the British public of that time needed a boost in morale due to World War II, Olivier completely omitted the part about Bardolph's execution on Henry's approval in order to present a more positive take on the titular character. This results in Bardolph simply disappearing from the film without explanation after the Harfleur scene.
- In the 1965 film Chimes at Midnight, Orson Welles' adaptation of Henry IV (with brief passages from various other plays by Shakespeare), Bardolph was played by Patrick Bedford.
- In the 1989 Kenneth Branagh film version of Henry V, he was played by Richard Briers, in which his execution is depicted.
- In the film Cold Mountain (2003), set during the American Civil War, three Union soldiers named Bardolph, Nym, and Pistol desert the army to become bandits and raiders.
- On television Bardolph has been portrayed several times by Gordon Gostelow, an actor who was described as "born" to play the part. He first depicted him in the 1960 BBC series An Age of Kings, which was a series of adaptations of Shakespeare's history plays concerning the Wars of the Roses. In the episode of Henry V, after Bardolph dies Gostelow is 'reborn' to become Sir Thomas Erpingham, mutating from the king's disreputable companion in criminality to the king's noble companion before Agincourt.
- in the 1979 season of the BBC Television Shakespeare series, Gordon Gostelow also played Bardolph in the episodes of the Henriad plays as well as The Merry Wives of Windsor in the 1982 season.
- In the 1989 television presentation of the Henry trilogy as co-directed by Michael Bogdanov and Michael Pennington; that was taped live on stage as part of their English Shakespeare Company "War of the Roses" series, Bardolph was played by Colin Farrell (not to be confused with the film star of the same name). In this mostly modernised presentation of the Henrys, Farrell played Bardolph as a likeable sad sack type who covered many scene changes with brief melancholy solos on a trombone. His execution was actually depicted in Henry V by gunshot in silhouette, and just in the An Age of Kings version, Farrell afterwards was 'reborn' in the role of the more respectable Sir Thomas Erpingham.
- In the 2012 television presentation of the Henrys that was part of the series The Hollow Crown, he was portrayed by Tom Georgeson. His death is again depicted by hanging as indicated in the original Henry V.
