= James White (1775–1820) =

English advertising agent and author

James White was an English advertising agent, author and lifelong friend of Charles Lamb.

== Personal life ==
He was the son of Samuel and Mary White and was baptised at the Church of St. John in Bedwardine, Worcester, on 17 April 1775.

At the age of 8, he was admitted to Christ's Hospital school on the Presentation of Thomas Coventry on 19 September 1783. He left the school on 30 April 1790 in order to become a clerk in the treasurer's office at the school. While at the school, White formed a close and long-lasting friendship with Charles Lamb, who was the same age as he. Charles Lamb refers to James White in many of his letters and the Essays of Elia (in particular the essay entitled The Praise of Chimney-Sweepers).

White developed a fascination with the character of Falstaff and was even known to dress up and go about "in character". This led to him writing and publishing in 1796 his only known book: Original Letters, etc, of Sir John Falstaff and his friends, a collection of letters supposed to have been written by Falstaff and his friends, found in an archive kept by Mistress Quickly's heirs.

White died at his house in Burton Crescent (since renamed Cartwright Gardens in London on 13 March 1820. He was survived by his wife Margaret (daughter of Robert Faulder the bookseller) and three children. After his death, his business seems to have been initially managed by his wife, and was later taken over by his son Robert Faulder White.

James White is a great-great-grandfather of the author T. H. White (1906–1964) and Roger Bushell.

== Publishing ==
In 1800 he founded an advertising company in Warwick Square, which subsequently moved in 1808 to 33 Fleet Street, London and became R. F. White & Son Ltd. (Note: The company was named for White's son Robert Faulder White (1815–1856).) This is considered to be the UK's first advertising agency and the advent of copywriting.
