= William Kenrick (writer) =

18th-century English novelist, playwright, translator, and satirist

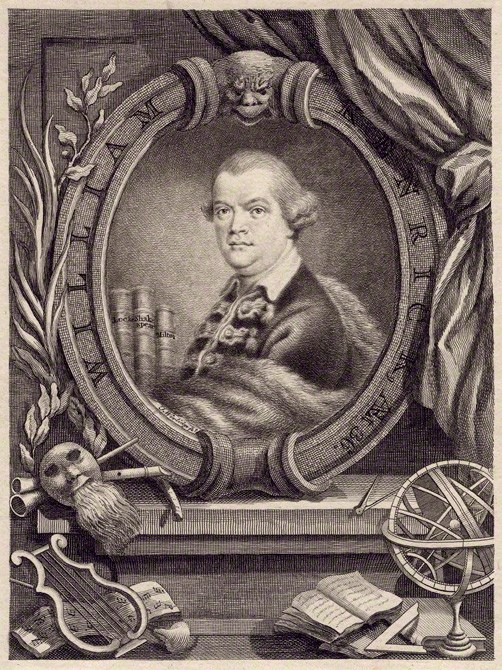
Kenrick in 1766

William Kenrick (c. 1725 – 10 June 1779) was an English novelist, playwright, translator and satirist, who spent much of his career libelling and lampooning his fellow writers.

== Life and career ==
Kenrick was born at Watford, Hertfordshire, son of a stay-maker. He apparently obtained a doctorate at Leiden University (although other sources maintain he went to a Scottish university) and appeared for the first time as a pamphletist in 1751 where he wrote, under the name of "Ontologos", The Grand Question debated; or an Essay to prove that the Soul of Man is not, neither can it be Immortal. In typical fashion, Kenrick forthwith provided an answer to this question proving the reverse, a tactic he often used in order to publicize his productions.

One of his first targets was the vulnerable Christopher Smart whose poem "Night Piece" he attacked in the London monthly journal The Kapelion; or Poetical Ordinary, consisting of Great Variety of Dishes in Prose and Verse, recommended to all who have a Good Taste or Keen Appetite in 1750 under the nom de plume Whimsey Banter.

In 1752 Kenrick publicly mocked Henry Fielding and Tobias Smollett in his entertainment Fun: a Parodi-tragi-comical Satire, a parody of Macbeth in which the weird sisters circle about their cauldron, throwing in contemporary novels, periodicals and pamphlets. The play was banned by the Lord Mayor, however, "as it was to have been perform’d at the Castle-Tavern, Pater-noster-Row, on Thursday, February 13, 1752, but Suppressed, by a Special Order from the Lord-Mayor and Court of Aldermen." (see the Paper War of 1752–1753).

James Boswell records a meeting with Kenrick on Friday, 3 April 1772:

In the evening came a company of literati invited for me: Dr. Jeffries, Dr. Gilbert Stuart, a Mr. Leeson, and Kenrick, now Dr. Kenrick, who once wrote an 18d. pamphlet against me, but principally against Mr. Johnson, though it was entitled A Letter to James Boswell, Esq. Kenrick was quite a different man from what I expected to see. His Epistles, Philosophical and Moral promised seriousness or rather profound gravity; and many of his other writings promised acrimony to a high degree. But I found him a bluff, hearty little man, full of spirits and cheerfulness. He said devotion was not natural; that is to say, the devotion of the heart; that fear made people use ceremonies but did not inspire true devotion. He said he had a pronouncing dictionary almost ready, by which he hoped to fix a standard, as the varieties of pronunciation among people in genteel life were very few. He said he taught a man from Aberdeen to speak good English in six weeks. He said his great difficulty was to get him to speak at all. He told him, "Sir, you don't speak at all. You sing."

=== Success ===
Kenrick's most successful work, reprinted in over 20 editions, was a courtesy book published in 1753 under the title The Whole Duty of a Woman; or, A Complete System of Female Morality, &c., but the author was simply listed as "A Lady." Kenrick here assumed the persona of a fallen woman, now reformed, who wants to persuade other women to live a life of virtue. The irony of Kenrick's presuming to improve the moral tone of feminine England has not gone unnoticed: he has been described as "one of London's most despised, drunken, and morally degenerate hack writers in the later eighteenth century."

In 1758 appeared his versified Epistles, Philosophical and Moral, an "avowed defence of infidelity" which afford the best specimens of his poetry.

In November 1759, Kenrick (the "superlative scoundrel") succeeded Oliver Goldsmith as editor of The Monthly Review. He signalled his advent by writing an outrageous attack upon Goldsmith's "Enquiry into the Present State of Polite Learning in Europe". His vilification was so unjustified that Ralph Griffiths (the publisher) made an indirect apology for his successor by a favourable though brief review (in June, 1762) of "The Citizen of the World".

=== Publications and works ===
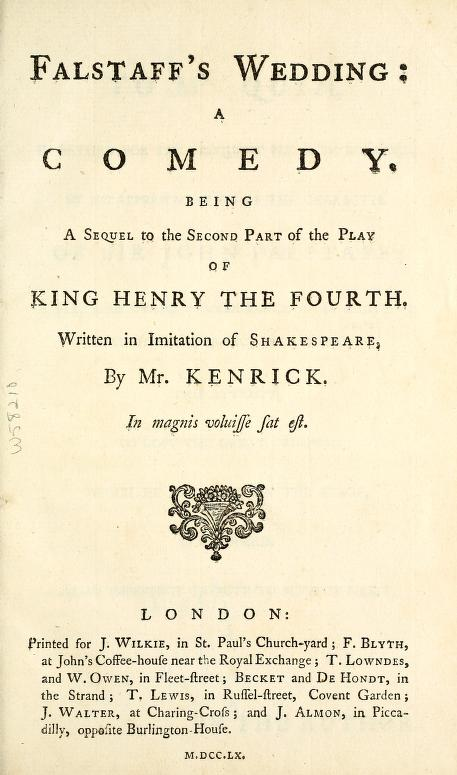
The title page of Kenrick's Falstaff's Wedding

Kenrick published his translation of Jean-Jacques Rousseau's Julie, ou La Nouvelle Héloïse in 1761. In spite of the fact that he substituted throughout the name of Eloisa for that of Julie (a matter of no importance to the reader, as he wrote), the work was a success and enjoyed six reprintings up to 1776.

In 1765 Kenrick published A Review of Dr Johnson's new edition of Shakspeare: in which the Ignorance, or Inattention, of that Editor is exposed, and the Poet defended from the Persecution of his Commentators.

James Boswell reported that:

Johnson was virulently attacked by Mr. William Kenrick, who obtained the degree of LL.D. from a Scotch University, and wrote for the booksellers in a great variety of branches. Though he certainly was not without considerable merit, he wrote with so little regard to decency and principles, and decorum, and in so hasty a manner, that his reputation was neither extensive nor lasting. I remember one evening, when some of his works were mentioned, Dr. Goldsmith said, he had never heard of them; upon which Dr. Johnson observed, "Sir, he is one of the many who have made themselves publick, without making themselves known.".

Falstaff's Wedding, a comic sequel to Henry IV, Part 2, written in imitation of Shakespeare, was published in 1760. A heavily rewritten version of the play was staged only for a single performance in 1766, and was revived infrequently. The rewritten version was published in the same year.

The Widowed Wife (1767) was better received: it staged for 14 nights and resumed the next season.

In 1770 and 1771 Kenrick published two pieces on perpetual motion: An account of the Automaton, or Perpetual Motion of Orffyreus and A Lecture on the Perpetual Motion. Kenrick complained:

One species of our predecessor's merit, however, I presume myself at least entitled to, that of perseverance; it being now fifteen years since I first engaged in this undertaking, which I have since pursued with almost unremitted assiduity, and that not only at considerable waste of time and expense, but under the constant mortification of hearing it equally ridiculed by those who do know, and by those who do not know, anything of the matter.

In 1772, he published Love in the Suds, a town eclogue: being the lamentation of Roscius for the loss of his Nyky, a direct and scurrilous attack on David Garrick, making explicit charges of homosexuality with Isaac Bickerstaffe against the great actor. Garrick immediately took legal action against Kenrick who was forced to publish a somewhat ambivalent apology.

In 1773 he published a A New Dictionary of the English Language, where he indicated pronunciation with diacritical marks and to divided words according to their syllables; it was meant as a response to James Buchanan's Linguæ Britannicæ Vera Pronunciatio – the only pronouncing dictionary at that time, which Kenrick censured for its Scottish origin. In the same year, on 20 November 1773 his comedy The Duellist was launched at Covent Garden, but lasted only one night.

In 1775 Kenrick founded the book review digest The London Review of English and Foreign Literature which ran from 1775 to 1780, a monthly review of 80 pages which attacked most of the contemporary writers and their works, and gave habitual bad reviews to Covent Garden and Drury Lane theatres. The magazine was continued for a year after his death by his son William Shakespeare Kenrick.

1778 saw the production of two more Kenrick plays: The Lady of the Manor, a comic opera with music by James Hook, was the most successful of Kenrick's such works; and The Spendthrift; or, The Christmas Gambol, a farce based on Charles Johnson's The Country Lasses which was taken off after only two nights.

From 1778 to 1779 he directed a translation of Voltaire's works in eight volumes.

=== Alcoholism and death ===
According to the General Biographical Dictionary of 1815 in Kenrick's later years he drank very heavily, a habit which probably caused his relatively early death:

In his latter days, his constitution was so much injured by inebriety, that he generally wrote with a bottle of brandy by his elbow, which at length terminated his career June 10, 1779, less lamented than perhaps any person known in the literary world, yet possessed of talents which, under a steady and virtuous direction, might have procured him an honourable place among the authors of his time.

Indeed, Kenrick wrote revealingly of himself that he drank spirits (aqua vitae), to pen acid (aqua fortis):

The Wits, who drink water and suck sugar-candy,
Impute the strong spirit of Kenrick to brandy.
They are not so much out: the matter, in short, is---
He sips aqua vitae, and spits aqua fortis.

== Sources ==
- Charles N. Baldwin, A Universal Biographical Dictionary, Andrus & Judd, 1833
