= Geoffrey Bayldon =

English actor (1924–2017)

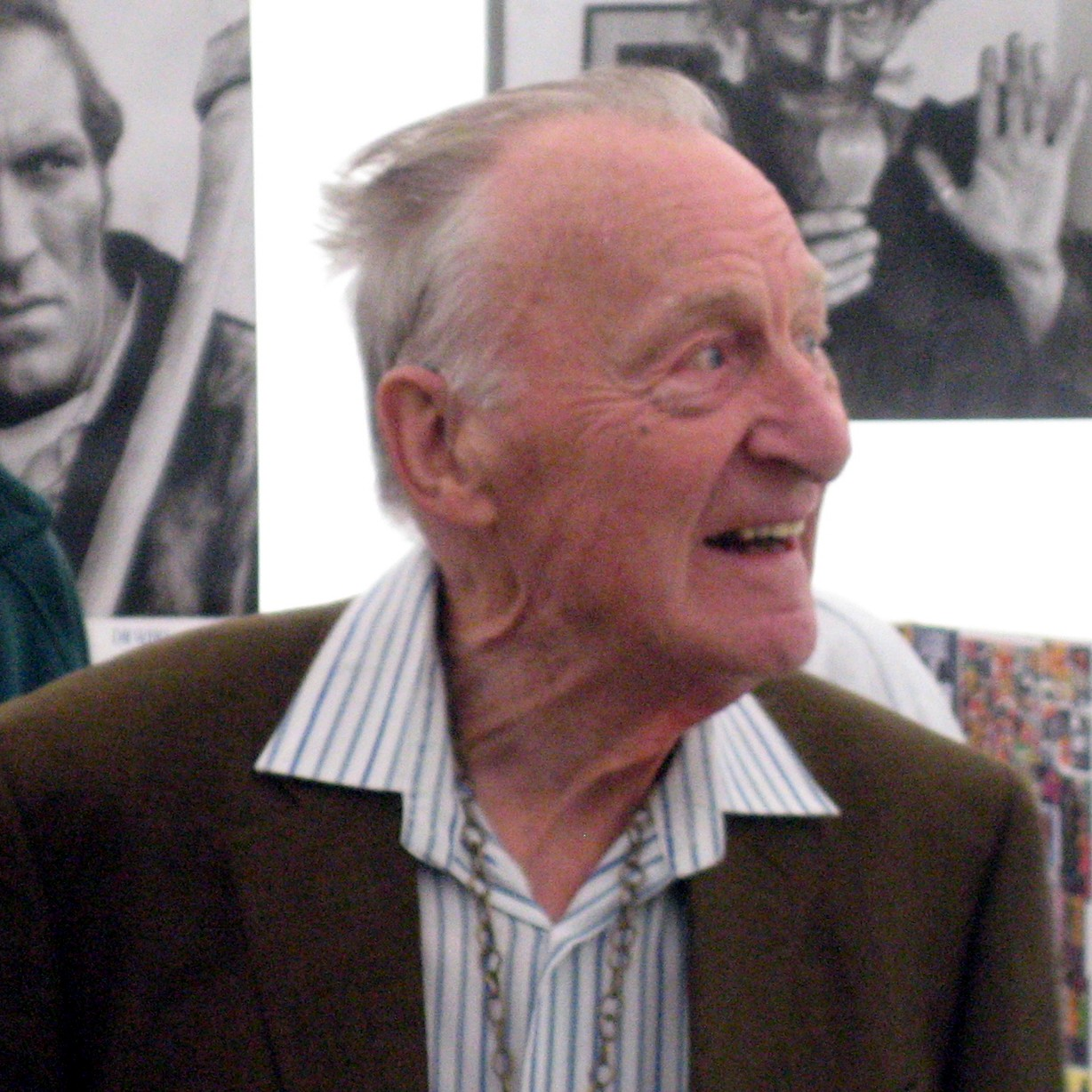
- Bayldon in 2009
- Born: Albert Geoffrey Bayldon; 7 January 1924; Leeds, England
- Died: 10 May 2017 (aged 93); Barnes, London, England
- Occupation: Actor
- Years active: 1952–2010
- Partner: Alan Rowe (died 2000)
- Relatives: Oliver Bayldon (cousin)

Albert Geoffrey Bayldon (7 January 1924 – 10 May 2017) was an English actor. After playing roles in many stage productions, including the works of William Shakespeare, he became known for portraying the title role of the children's series Catweazle (1969–70). Bayldon's other long-running parts include the Crowman in Worzel Gummidge (1979–81) and Magic Grandad in the BBC television series Watch (1995).

== Early life ==
Bayldon was born 7 January 1924 in Leeds and attended Bridlington School and Hull College of Architecture. Following service in the Royal Air Force during World War II, he appeared in amateur theatricals and then trained at the Old Vic Theatre School.

== Career ==
Bayldon enjoyed a substantial stage career, including work in the West End and for the RSC. He made several film appearances starting in the 1950’s and 1960s, including A Night to Remember (1958), in which he played the SS Californian's wireless operator, Cyril Evans, one of his first speaking and credited film roles. King Rat (1965), To Sir, with Love (1967), Casino Royale (as Q) (1967), the Envy segment of The Magnificent Seven Deadly Sins (1971), the Marc Bolan/T. Rex film Born to Boogie (1972), The Pink Panther Strikes Again (1976), as well as the film versions of Steptoe and Son, Steptoe and Son Ride Again (1973) as the vicar, and Porridge (1979) as the Prison Governor.

Bayldon also appeared in several horror films; Dracula and Frankenstein Must Be Destroyed for Hammer Films and The House That Dripped Blood, Asylum and Tales from the Crypt for Amicus. In 2004, after many years of successful television work he appeared in the film Ladies in Lavender.

He appeared in Doctor Who with a guest appearance as Organon in The Creature from the Pit (1979) opposite Tom Baker as the Fourth Doctor. Subsequently, he played an alternative First Doctor in two audio plays based on the Doctor Who television series by Big Finish Productions in the Doctor Who Unbound series: Auld Mortality (2003) and A Storm of Angels (2005). In 1963, Bayldon had been one of the first actors offered the role of the Doctor.

Bayldon's other television roles include, ITV Play of the Week (1957, 1959, 1964, 1967), The Avengers (1961 and 1967), Z-Cars (1963, 1968), Theatre 625 (1964–1968), The Wednesday Play (1968, 1969), ITV Sunday Night Theatre (1970, 1972), Space: 1999 (1976), The Tomorrow People (1976), Tales of the Unexpected (1980, 1983), Blott on the Landscape (1985), Star Cops (1987), Rumpole of the Bailey (1987), The Chronicles of Narnia (1989). He later took part in a number of BBC Schools programmes, where he displayed a number of otherwise unexploited talents (such as singing). In 1993, he played Simplicio in the Open University video Newton's Revolution.

In 1986, Bayldon provided the vocals on Paul Hardcastle's "The Wizard" which was also used (without the vocal) as the theme for BBC1's Top of the Pops.

Among his later television appearances were the Five game show Fort Boyard (1998–2001), Waking the Dead (2004), Heartbeat (2004) and Casualty (2006, after previous appearances in 1991, 1997 and 2004). His final television appearances, before his retirement, were New Tricks (2007) and My Family (2010).

== Death ==
Bayldon died on 10 May 2017, aged 93, from undisclosed causes. He was predeceased by his partner, actor Alan Rowe, who died in 2000.

== Filmography ==
Year	Title	Role	Notes
1952	The Stranger Left No Card	Clerk	Short film
1952	Trent's Last Case	Reporter in court	Uncredited
1958	The Camp on Blood Island	Foster	Uncredited
1958	Dracula	Porter	
1958	A Night to Remember	Cyril Evans	
1958	The Two-Headed Spy	Dietz	
1959	Idol on Parade	Record Producer	Uncredited
1959	Whirlpool	Wendel	
1959	Yesterday's Enemy	Soldier Who Dies	Uncredited
1959	The Rough and the Smooth	Ransom	
1959	Libel	Second Photographer	
1960	The Day They Robbed the Bank of England	The Bombardier bartender	Uncredited
1961	Greyfriars Bobby	The Vicar	
1961	Bomb in the High Street	Clay	
1962	Jigsaw	Constable at Murder Scene	Uncredited
1962	The Longest Day	Officer at Eisenhower Briefing	Uncredited
1962	The Amorous Prawn	Second Telephone Operator	Uncredited
1963	55 Days at Peking	Smythe	
1964	Becket	Brother Phillip	Uncredited
1965	King Rat	Vexley	
1965	Life at the Top	Industrial Psychologist	
1965	Where the Spies Are	Lecturer	
1966	Sky West and Crooked	Philip Moss	
1967	Casino Royale	Q	
1967	To Sir, with Love	Theo Weston	
1968	Two a Penny	Alec Fitch	
1968	Assignment K	The Boffin	
1968	Inspector Clouseau	Gutch	
1968	A Dandy in Aspic	Lake	
1969	Otley	Superintendent Hewitt	
1969	Frankenstein Must Be Destroyed	Police Doctor	
1969	The Bushbaby	Tilison	
1970	Scrooge	Pringle/Toyshop Owner	
1971	Say Hello to Yesterday	Estate Agent	
1971	The Raging Moon	Mr. Latbury	
1971	The House That Dripped Blood	Theo Von Hartmann	"The Cloak" segment
1971	The Magnificent Seven Deadly Sins	Vernon	"Envy segment
1972	Tales from the Crypt	Guide	
1972	Asylum	Max	"Mannikins of Horror" segment
1972	Au Pair Girls	Mr. Howard	
1973	Gawain and the Green Knight	Wiseman	
1973	Steptoe and Son Ride Again	Vicar	
1976	The Slipper and the Rose	Archbishop	
1976	The Pink Panther Strikes Again	Dr. Duval	
1977	Charleston	Uncle Fred	
1979	Porridge	Governor	
1981	The Monster Club	Psychiatrist	"Shadmock Story" segment
1983	Bullshot	Colonel Hinchcliffe	
1988	Madame Sousatzka	Mr. Cordle	
1988	The Tenth Man	Elderly Clerk	
1991	Necessary Love	Bernardo	
1994	Tom & Viv	Harwent	
1994	Asterix Conquers America	Getafix (Original version)	
1999	Asterix and Obelix vs. Caesar	Additional Voices (English dub)	Uncredited
2004	Ladies in Lavender	Mr. Penhaligan	

== Television ==
Year	Title	Role	Notes				
1952–1958	BBC Sunday Night Theatre	Unknown/Radford	2 episodes				
1957	The Vise	Doctor	Episode: "The Baby-Sitter"				
1957	O.S.S.	Abwehr Lieutenant	Episode: "Operation Dagger"				
1957–1958	The Adventures of Robin Hood	Cal/Count de Severne	2 episodes				
1957–1958	Sword of Freedom	Various	3 episodes				
1957–1967	ITV Play of the Week	Various	4 episodes				
1959–1961	ITV Television Playhouse	George/TV Producer	2 episodes				
1960	Man from Interpol	Freddie	Episode: "The International Diamond Incident"				
1960	An Age of Kings	Various	Miniseries				
1960	The Adventures of Alice	White Knight	TV Play				
1960	Saturday Playhouse	Tom Walters	Episode: "A Run for the Money"				
1960–1961	BBC Sunday-Night Play	Various	5 episodes				
1961	Top Secret	Vogel	Episode: "Destination Buenos Aires"				
1961, 1963	No Hiding Place	Stephen Palmer/Dr. Penston	2 episodes				
1961, 1967	The Avengers	Professor Kilbride/Clapham	2 episodes				
1962	The Magical World of Disney	Sir Geoffrey	Episode: "The Prince and the Pauper: The Pauper King"				
1962	Suspense	Dr. Corbally	Episode: "Dr. Corbally and Certain Death"				
1963	Bootsie and Snudge	Adams	Episode: "The Lorry Route"				
1963	Drama 61-67	Matthew Dowd	Episode: "Loop"				
1963–1968	Z-Cars	Blake/Mr. Smayles	3 episodes				
1964	Sergeant Cork	Menzies	Episode: "The Case of the Ormsby Diamonds"				
1964	First Night	Max	Episode: "Hunt the Man"				
1964	Ghost Squad	Ernst Hartmann	Episode: "Rich Ruby Wine"				
1964–1967	The Saint	Wilfred Garniman/Marcel Legrand	2 episodes				
1964–1968	Theatre 625	Various	5 episodes				
1964–1968	Detective	Stephen Protheroe/Kingston	2 episodes				
1965	The Edgar Wallace Mystery Theater	Lane	Episode:Dead Man's Chest				
1965	Danger Man	Dickinson	Episode: "A Very Dangerous Game"				
1965–1974	BBC Play of the Month	Various	4 episodes				
1967	The Newcomers	Mr. Parkinson	4 episodes				
1968	ITV Playhouse	Austin Withers	Episode: "The Curtis Affair"				
1968–1969	The Wednesday Play	Mr. Mileson/Henry Ramsden	2 episodes				
1969	Journey to the Unknown	Mr. Jim Plimmer	Episode: "The Last Visitor"				
1969	The Expert	Laurence Richie	Episode: "Playing With Fire"				
1969–1973	Special Branch	Alex Rumsher/Sumner	2 episodes				
1970	Codename	Blair	Episode: "Opening Gambit"				
1970–1971	Catweazle	Catweazle					
1970–1972	ITV Saturday Night Theatre	Various	3 episodes				
1971	The Fenn Street Gang	Magistrate	Episode: "Rough Justice"				
1972	The Adventures of Black Beauty	Professor Miles	2 episodes				
1972	The Strauss Family	Schlumberger	Episode: "Revolution"				
1972, 1991	Van der Valk	Joseph Kettner/Nicholas Meijers	2 episodes				
1973	Pathfinders	Dr. Pers Anderson	Episode: "Sweets from a Stanger"				
1973	Armchair Theatre	Uncle Norman	Episode: "That Sinking Feeling"				
1973	Orson Welles Great Mysteries	Magistrate	Episode: "The Ingenious Reporter"				
1973	Heil Caesar	Lepidus	Episode: "Defeat"				
1974	Napoleon and Love	Prince of Mecklenburg	Episode: "Maria Luisa"				
1974	Comedy Playhouse	Franklyn Sims	Episode: "Franklyn and Johnie"				
1974	Justice	Dr. Lomax	Episode: "Trial for Murder"				
1974	The Gathering Storm	Kurt von Schushsnigg	TV film				
1975	Churchill's People		Episode: "Mother India"				
1975	Beryl's Lot	Ninian Phelps	Episode: "After the Wedding Was Over"				
1975–1982	Crown Court	Edgar Dryden/Ambrose Baker	6 episodes				
1976	The Tomorrow People	Tirayaan	Serial: "Into the Unknown"				
1976	Space: 1999	Number Eight	Episode: "One Moment of Humanity"				
1976	BBC2 Playhouse	Mr. Smythe	Episode: "The Mind Beyond: The Man with the Power"				
1977	Just William	Great Man	Episode: "William's Lucky Day"				
1977	The Duchess of Duke Street	Collinghurst	Episode: "Shadows"				
1977, 1982	Jackanory Playhouse	King Ozymandias/Father Time	2 episodes				
1978	The Famous Five	Mr. Gringle	Episode: "Five Go to Billycock Hill"				
1978	Look and Read	Charles Trim	Serial: "Sky Hunter"				
1978–1989	All Creatures Great and Small	Various	3 episodes				
1979	Doctor Who	Organon	Serial: "The Creature from the Pit"				
1979	Sherlock Holmes and Doctor Watson	Morton Hadlock	Episode: "The Case of the Deadly Tower"				
1979–1981	Worzel Gummidge	The Crowman					
1980	Cribb	Uncle Ezra Winter	Episode: "Something Old, Something New"				
1980	Turtle's Progress	Sammy Violin	1 episode				
1980–1983	Tales of the Unexpected	Dr. Applegate/Sid	2 episodes				
1981	Juliet Bravo	Jack Lord	Episode: "Journeys"				
1981	Bergerac	Henry Bernard	Episode: "Relative Values"				
1981	Lady Killers	Dr. Alfred Austin French	Episode: "My Perfect Husband"				
1983–1984	Hallelujah!	Mr. Sedgwick/Jacob Marley	3 episodes				
1984	Who Dares Wins	Server	1 episode				
1984	Scene	Mr. Lawson/Bernard James	2 episodes				
1985	Blott on the Landscape	Ganglion	Miniseries				
1986	In Loving Memory	Ballonist	Episode: "Up in the World"				
1987	Rumpole of the Bailey	Brinsley Lampitt	Episode: "Rumpole and the Judge's Elbow"				
1987	Star Cops	Ernst Wolfhartt	Episode: "Other People's Secrets"				
1988	The Return of Sherlock Holmes	Sidney Johnson	Episode: "The Bruce-Parlington Plans"				
1988	The StoryTeller	King	Episode: "Sapsorrow"				
1989	Dramarama	Fishman	Episode: "The Pisces Connection"				
1989	The Chronicles of Narnia	Ramandu	Episode: "Voyage of the Dawn Treader: Part 4"				
1990	Campion	Rev. Swithin Crush	Episode: "Mystery Mile: Part 1"				
1991–2006	Casualty	Various	4 episodes				
1993–1994	Magic Grandad	Magic Grandad					
1994	Soldier Soldier	Jack Knight	Episode: "Further Education"				
1995	Last of the Summer Wine	Broadbent	Episode: "Adopted by a Stray"				
1995	The Biz	Markov					
1995	Pie in the Sky	Seymour Flint	Episode: "Black Pudding"				
1995–1997	Wycliffe	Gilbert Rawle/Judge	2 episodes				
1996	Faith in the Future	Mr. Quigley	Episode: "Art Lovers"				
1997	The New Adventures of Robin Hood	Merlin	Episode: "The Legend of Olywn"				
1997	Knight School	Dr. Spencer DePenser	Episode: "Opening Knight"				
1998-2001	Fort Boyard	The Professor	Series 1-4 (54 Episodes)	1998	Peak Practice	Alby James	2 episodes
1998, 2002	Where the Heart Is	Edward Smith/Wally Vernon					2 episodes
1998, 2004	Heartbeat	Follett/Gilbert Percy					2 episodes
2000	Midsomer Murders	Arthur Prewitt	Episode: "Blue Herrings"				
2004	Waking the Dead	Edward Atkinson	Episode: "In Sight of the Lord"				
2005	Doctors	Joseph Makin	Episode: "Father's Day"				
2007	New Tricks	Leonard Casey	Episode: "God's Waiting Room"				
2010	My Family	Joe	Episode: "The Son'll Come Out"				

== Theatre ==
Year	Title	Role	Notes
1948-1949	The Clandestine Marriage		The Old Vic, London
1949	Tough at the Top		Adelphi Theatre, London
1950	Measure for Measure	Froth	Shakespeare Memorial Theatre
1950	Henry VIII (press night)	Cranmer	Shakespeare Memorial Theatre
1950	Julius Caesar (press night)	Ligarius	Shakespeare Memorial Theatre
1950	King Lear (press night)	Servant	Shakespeare Memorial Theatre
1951	Richard II (press night)	Servant	Shakespeare Memorial Theatre
1951	Henry IV, Part 2 (press night)	Feeble	Shakespeare Memorial Theatre
1951	The Tempest (press night)	Gonzalo	Shakespeare Memorial Theatre
1951	Henry V (press night)	Macmorris	Shakespeare Memorial Theatre
1951-1952	Henry V		Shakespeare Memorial Theatre
1952	The Happy Time	Dr. Gagngon	St James's Theatre and Lyceum Theatre
1953	The Way of the World	Footman	Lyric Theatre, London
1953	Venice Preserv'd	Durand	Lyric Theatre, London
1954	A Midsummer Night's Dream (press night)	Egeus	Shakespeare Memorial Theatre
1954	Romeo and Juliet (press night)	Peter	Shakespeare Memorial Theatre
1954	The Taming of the Shrew (press night)	Hortensio	Shakespeare Memorial Theatre
1954	Troilus and Cressida (press night)	Priam	Shakespeare Memorial Theatre
1955	Macbeth	Duncan/A Doctor	Shakespeare Memorial Theatre
1955	All's Well That Ends Well	Rinaldo	Shakespeare Memorial Theatre
1955	Macbeth	Duncan/A Doctor	Shakespeare Memorial Theatre
1955	The Merry Wives of Windsor	Slender	Shakespeare Memorial Theatre
1955	Titus Andronicus (press night)	Aemilius	Shakespeare Memorial Theatre
1955-1956	Caesar and Cleopatra		The Old Vic, London
1955-1956	The Marvellous Story of Puss in Boots	Puss	Birmingham Repertory Theatre
1956	The Clandestine Marriage	Lord Ogleby	Birmingham Repertory Theatre
1956	Juliua Caesar	Cassius	Birmingham Repertory Theatre
1956	Anne Boleyn	Thomas Cromwell	Birmingham Repertory Theatre
1956	Caesar and Cleopatra	Julius Caesar	Birmingham Repertory Theatre
1956	Caesar and Cleopatra	Julius Caesar	Malvern Theatre, Worcestershire
1956	Caesar and Cleopatra	Julius Caesar	The Old Vic, London
1956	Happy as Larry		Birmingham Repertory Theatre
1956	The Lady's Not for Burning	Hebble Tyson	Birmingham Repertory Theatre
1956	Coriolanus	Menenius Agrippa	Birmingham Repertory Theatre
1956	Dr Jekyll and Mr Hyde		Birmingham Repertory Theatre
1956-1957	The Emperor's New Clothes	The Emperor	Birmingham Repertory Theatre
1957	Henry V	Pistol	Birmingham Repertory Theatre
1957	The Outcast	Nicholas Carter, Q.C.	Birmingham Repertory Theatre
1957	Slave of Truth		Birmingham Repertory Theatre
1957	Sganarelle		Birmingham Repertory Theatre
1965	The Cavern	The Superintendent	Cambridge Arts Theatre, New Theatre, Oxford, and other locations.
1980-1981	Worzel Gummidge	The Crowman	Birmingham Repertory Theatre
1981-1982	Worzel Gummidge	The Crowman	Cambridge Theatre, London
1985-1986	A Month of Sundays	Aylott	Duchess Theatre and Nuffield Theatre
1989-1990	Marya		The Old Vic, London
1993-1994	Unfinished Business	Beamish (age 70)	Barbican Theater
1994	Unfinished Business	Beamish (age 70)	Barbican Pit
