= An Age of Kings =

1960 British TV series

- North American DVD cover
- Genre: Drama; Tragedy; History
- Created by: Peter Dews
- Developed by: Eric Crozier
- Written by: William Shakespeare
- Directed by: Michael Hayes
- Theme music composer: Arthur Bliss
- Composer: Christopher Whelen
- Country of origin: United Kingdom
- Original language: English
- No. of series: 1
- No. of episodes: 15

Production
- Producer: Peter Dews
- Camera setup: Multi-camera
- Production company: BBC Television

Original release
- Network: BBC Television Service
- Release: 28 April – 17 November 1960

An Age of Kings is a fifteen-part serial adaptation of the eight sequential history plays of William Shakespeare (Richard II, 1 Henry IV, 2 Henry IV, Henry V, 1 Henry VI, 2 Henry VI, 3 Henry VI and Richard III), produced and broadcast in Britain by the BBC in 1960. The United States broadcast of the series the following year was hosted by University of Southern California professor Frank Baxter, who provided an introduction for each episode specifically tailored for the American audience. At the time, the show was the most ambitious Shakespearean television adaptation ever made and was a critical and commercial success in both the UK and the US. Performed live, all episodes were telerecorded during their original broadcast.

== Introduction ==
The concept for the series originated in 1959 with Peter Dews, a veteran BBC producer and director, who was inspired by a 1951 Anthony Quayle-directed production of the Henriad at the Theatre Royal and a 1953 Douglas Seale-directed repertory cast production of the three parts of Henry VI at the Birmingham Repertory Theatre and subsequently, The Old Vic. At the time, An Age of Kings was the most conceptually ambitious Shakespeare project ever undertaken, containing over 600 speaking roles, and requiring thirty weeks of rehearsal prior to performance. Each episode cost roughly £4,000. Adapter Eric Crozier cut the text of the eight plays into sixty-, seventy-, seventy-five- and eighty-minute episodes, with each episode roughly corresponding to half of each play. The only exception to this was 1 Henry VI, which was reduced to a single hour-long episode.

Dews sourced most of his cast from The Old Vic, using many of the same actors who had appeared in Seale's production, although in different roles (Paul Daneman for example, played Henry VI for Seale, but played Richard III in Age of Kings). Dews also used actors with whom he had worked while directing undergraduate plays at Oxford University. He gave the job of directing to his assistant, Michael Hayes. The initial plan was for the series to be the inaugural production in the BBC's newly built BBC Television Centre in London, but when the studios opened, the series was not ready, and was instead broadcast from the Riverside Studios in Hammersmith. Peter Dews described the set as "a large permanent structure; platforms, steps, corridors, pillars, and gardens, which will house nearly all the plays' action and which will, despite its outward realism, be not very far from Shakespeare's "unworthy scaffold"." The entire production was shot with four cameras running at any given time. For battle scenes, a cyclorama was used as a backdrop, obscured with smoke. Almost the entire series was shot in medium and close-ups. All fifteen episodes were broadcast live, though a "telerecording" of the series was also made.

Many of the episodes ended with wordless pseudo-teasers for the following episode. For example, "The Deposing of the King" ends with a shot of Northumberland's dagger stabbed into Henry IV's paperwork, visually alluding to his later rebellion. "Signs of War" ends with a shot of a signpost reading "Agincourt", alluding to the upcoming battle in the following episode. "The Sun in Splendour" ends with George, Duke of Clarence almost falling into a vat of wine, only to be saved by his brother, Richard, who looks deviously at the camera and smiles, alluding to his subsequent murder. "The Dangerous Brother" ends with Richard watching the sleeping Princes in the Tower before smiling to himself and then blowing out a candle, again alluding to his planned murder. Head of BBC drama Michael Barry referred to these "teasers" by explaining that "a strengthened purpose is added to the narrative when it is wholly seen, and we are able to look forward to 'what happens next'."

The series was a great success, with an average viewing audience of three million in the UK. The Times hailed the production as "monumental; a landmark in the BBC's Shakespearian tradition." The series won the British Guild of Directors' award for "Excellence in Directing" and the Peabody Award in the US. It led to a follow-up, The Spread of the Eagle, consisting of Shakespeare's Roman plays which did not prove as successful.

=== United States airing ===
After a run on the New York City independent commercial station WNEW beginning on 10 January 1961, the series was acquired for the United States public television network National Educational Television (NET) by the National Educational Television and Radio Center (NETRC), with financial support from the Humble Oil and Refining Company (the show was the first nationally distributed non-commercial series to receive support from a commercial source). Costing $250,000, Humble Oil not only paid for the national rights but also for all publicity. NETRC promoted the show based on its educational value rather than its entertainment value, referring to it as "an experience in historical and cultural understanding," and stating "insofar as we are able, cultural phenomena peculiar to the time and environment will be [...] explained, and significant themes will be explored wherever appropriate." Shakespeare scholar and Emmy Award-winning Frank Baxter of the University of Southern California provided commentary on the "historical, geographical and genealogical backgrounds of the plays." First airing on 20 October 1961, on the 60 non-commercial TV stations then on the air, it proved a hit with both audiences and critics; the New York Herald Tribune called it "easily one of the most magnificent efforts of the TV season"; The New York Times wrote, "whatever may be said of their ethics, those noblemen make for superb entertainment." As public television's first smash hit, the series led to many other successful British drama imports.

=== Other countries ===
The series was also shown in several other countries, typically to a positive response. For example, in Australia, it was broadcast on ABC from October 1961, and was met with positive reviews. In Canada the series started October 1963. In West Germany, it was shown on WDR in 1967–1968. In the Netherlands, it was shown on NCRV from January 1966, again meeting with good reviews.

== The episodes ==
=== "The Hollow Crown" ===
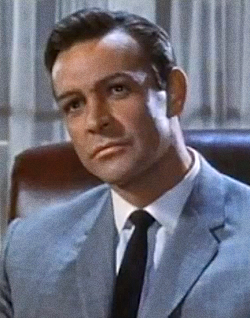
Sean Connery in Alfred Hitchcock's Marnie (1964). Connery was a relatively unknown actor when he was cast as Henry 'Hotspur' Percy in An Age of Kings.

- First transmitted: 28 April 1960
- Running time: 60 minutes
- Content: Richard II Acts 1, 2 and Act 3, Scenes 1 and 2 (up to Richard conceding defeat despite the protests of Carlisle, Scroop and Aumerle).
- David William as King Richard the Second
- Edgar Wreford as John of Gaunt
- Tom Fleming as Henry Bolingbroke
- Noel Johnson as Duke of Norfolk
- David Andrews as Sir John Bushy
- Terence Lodge as Sir William Bagot
- Jerome Willis as Sir Henry Green
- Julian Glover as Lord Marshal
- John Greenwood as Duke of Aumerle
- Geoffrey Bayldon as Duke of York
- Juliet Cooke as Queen
- George A. Cooper as Earl of Northumberland
- Alan Rowe as Lord Ross
- Gordon Gostelow as Lord Willoughby
- Brian Smith as Servant
- Sean Connery as Harry Percy
- John Ringham as Lord Berkeley
- Frank Windsor as Bishop of Carlisle
- Leon Shepperdson as Earl of Salisbury
- Patrick Garland as Sir Stephen Scroop

=== "The Deposing of a King" ===
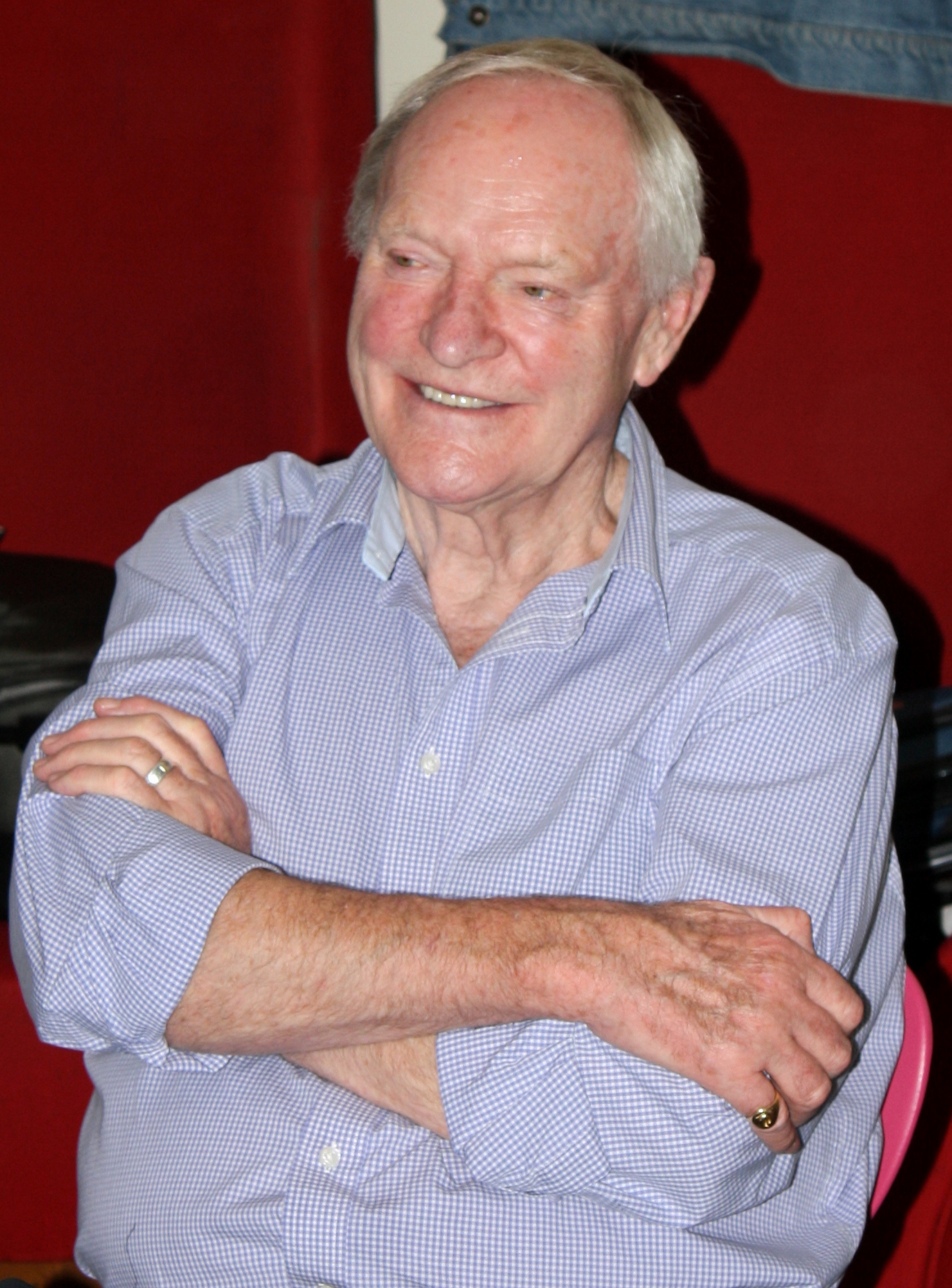
Julian Glover in 2011. Like many actors, Glover played multiple characters across the entire series, appearing in all but one episode.

- First transmitted: 12 May 1960
- Running time: 60 minutes
- Content: Richard II from Act 3, Scene 3 onwards (beginning with York chiding Northumberland for not referring to Richard as "King").
- Tom Fleming as Henry Bolingbroke
- George A. Cooper as Earl of Northumberland
- Geoffrey Bayldon as Duke of York
- Sean Connery as Harry Percy
- David William as King Richard the Second
- John Greenwood as Duke of Aumerle
- Juliet Cooke as Queen
- Maggie Barton as Lady
- Eileen Atkins as Lady
- Gordon Gostelow as A Gardener
- Terence Lodge as A Servant
- Frank Windsor as Bishop of Carlisle
- Michael Graham Cox as Abbot of Westminster
- Mary Law as Duchess of York
- Robert Lang as Sir Pierce of Exton
- Anthony Valentine as Servant
- Julian Glover as Groom
- Michael Graham Cox as Keeper

=== "Rebellion from the North" ===
- First transmitted: 26 May 1960
- Running time: 80 minutes
- Content: 1 Henry IV Acts 1 and 2 (up to Prince Hal expressing his disdain for the war).
- Tom Fleming as King Henry the Fourth
- Julian Glover as Earl of Westmoreland
- Frank Windsor as Sir Walter Blunt
- Patrick Garland as John of Lancaster
- Robert Hardy as Henry, Prince of Wales
- Frank Pettingell as Sir John Falstaff
- Brian Smith as Poins
- Geoffrey Bayldon as Earl of Worcester
- George A. Cooper as Earl of Northumberland
- Sean Connery as Hotspur
- Jerome Willis as Carrier
- Michael Graham Cox as Carrier
- Kenneth Farrington as Gadshill
- Gordon Gostelow as Bardolph
- Terence Lodge as Peto
- Patricia Heneghan as Lady Percy
- Derek Ware as Servant
- Timothy Harley as Francis
- John Ringham as Vintner
- Angela Baddeley as Mistress Quickly
- Robert Lang as Sheriff

=== "The Road to Shrewsbury" ===
- First transmitted: 9 June 1960
- Running time: 70 minutes
- Content: 1 Henry IV from Act 3, Scene 1 onwards (beginning with the strategy meeting between Hotspur, Mortimer and Glendower).
- David Andrews as Edmund Mortimer
- Sean Connery as Hotspur
- William Squire as Owen Glendower
- Geoffrey Bayldon as Earl of Worcester
- Valerie Gearon as Lady Mortimer
- Patricia Heneghan as Lady Percy
- Tom Fleming as King Henry the Fourth
- Robert Hardy as Henry, Prince of Wales
- Frank Windsor as Sir Walter Blunt
- Frank Pettingell as Sir John Falstaff
- Gordon Gostelow as Bardolph
- Angela Baddeley as Mistress Quickly
- Andrew Faulds as Earl of Douglas
- Anthony Valentine as Messenger
- Alan Rowe as Sir Richard Vernon
- Julian Glover as Earl of Westmoreland
- John Murray-Scott as 2nd Messenger
- Edgar Wreford as Archbishop of York
- Kenneth Farrington as Sir Michael
- Patrick Garland as John of Lancaster

=== "The New Conspiracy" ===
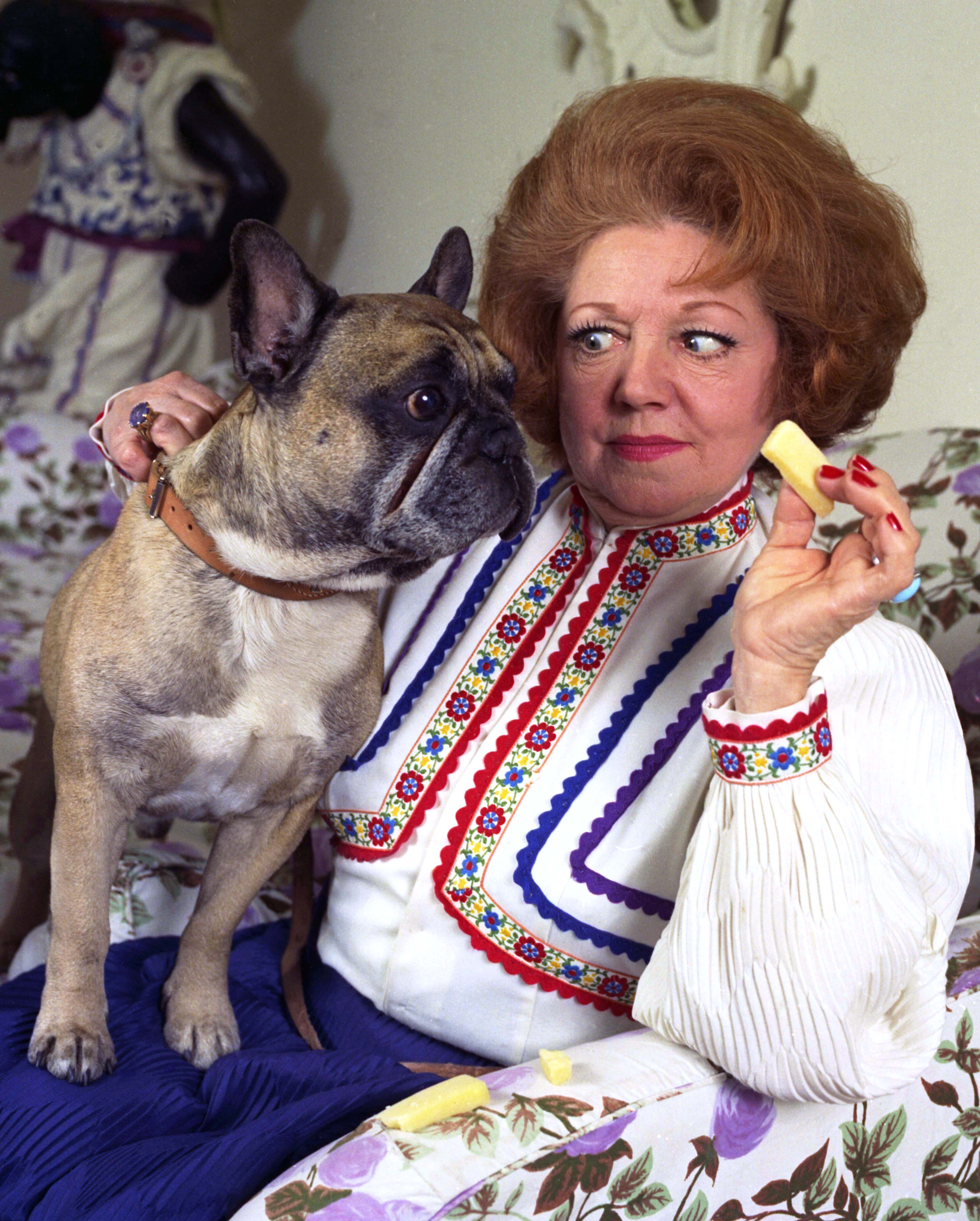
Hermione Baddeley appeared in a single episode only, portraying Doll Tearsheet.

- First transmitted: 23 June 1960
- Running time: 60 minutes
- Content: 2 Henry IV Acts 1 and 2 (up to Prince Hal being summoned to court).
- David Andrews as Lord Bardolph
- John Ringham as Porter
- George A. Cooper as Earl of Northumberland
- Terence Lodge as Travers
- Jerome Willis as Morton
- Frank Pettingell as Sir John Falstaff
- Dane Howell as Page
- Geoffrey Bayldon as Lord Chief Justice
- John Greenwood as Servant
- Edgar Wreford as Archbishop of York
- Noel Johnson as Thomas Mowbray
- Robert Lang as Lord Hastings
- Angela Baddeley as Mistress Quickly
- John Ringham as Fang
- Alan Rowe as Snare
- Jeremy Bisley as Gower
- Margaret Courtenay as Wife to Northumberland
- Patricia Heneghan as Lady Percy
- Robert Hardy as Henry, Prince of Wales
- Brian Smith as Poins
- Gordon Gostelow as Bardolph
- Timothy Harley as Drawer
- Michael Graham Cox as Drawer
- Hermione Baddeley as Doll Tearsheet
- George A. Cooper as Ancient Pistol
- Terence Lodge as Peto

=== "Uneasy Lies the Head" ===
- First transmitted: 7 July 1960
- Running time: 75 minutes
- Content: 2 Henry IV from Act 3, Scene 1 onwards (beginning with Henry IV recalling Richard II's prediction of civil war).
- Tom Fleming as King Henry the Fourth
- Kenneth Farrington as Earl of Warwick
- William Squire as Shallow
- John Warner as Silence
- Gordon Gostelow as Bardolph
- Dane Howell as Page
- Frank Pettingell as Sir John Falstaff
- Terence Lodge as Mouldy
- Leon Shepperdson as Shadow
- Terry Wale as Wart
- Brian Smith as Feeble
- Frank Windsor as Bullcalf
- Patrick Garland as Prince John of Lancaster
- Julian Glover as Earl of Westmoreland
- Edgar Wreford as Archbishop of York
- Noel Johnson as Thomas Mowbray
- Robert Lang as Lord Hastings
- John Ringham as Humphrey of Gloucester
- John Greenwood as Thomas of Clarence
- Alan Rowe as Harcourt
- Robert Hardy as Henry, Prince of Wales
- Geoffrey Bayldon as Lord Chief Justice
- Michael Graham Cox as Davy
- George A. Cooper as Ancient Pistol
- Derek Ware as Groom
- Anthony Valentine as Groom
- William Squire as Epilogue

=== "Signs of War" ===
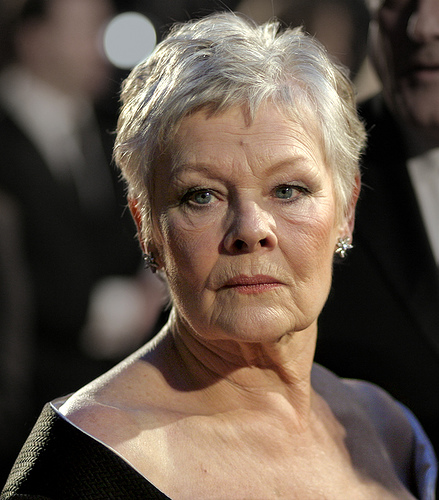
Judi Dench was already a well-known Shakespearean performer when she was cast as Katherine of Valois.

- First transmitted: 21 July 1960
- Running time: 60 minutes
- Content: Henry V Acts 1, 2 and 3 (up to the French yearning for what they feel will be an easy victory at Agincourt).
- William Squire as Chorus
- Robert Hardy as King Henry the Fifth
- Noel Johnson as Duke of Exeter
- Julian Glover as Earl of Westmoreland
- Cyril Luckham as Archbishop of Canterbury
- Leon Shepperdson as Rambures
- Frank Windsor as Earl of Cambridge
- Brian Smith as Lord Scroop
- Tony Garnett as Sir Thomas Grey
- Anthony Valentine as English Herald
- Gordon Gostelow as Bardolph
- David Andrews as Nym
- George A. Cooper as Pistol
- Angela Baddeley as Mistress Quickly
- Timothy Harley as Boy
- Patrick Garland as Duke of Bedford
- John Ringham as Duke of Gloucester
- Alan Rowe as King of France
- John Warner as The Dauphin
- George Selway as Constable of France
- Terence Lodge as Messenger
- Jerome Willis as Duke of Orléans
- Adrian Brine as Duke of Bourbon
- Stephanie Bidmead as Queen of France
- Judi Dench as Katherine
- Yvonne Coulette as Alice
- Kenneth Farrington as Fluellen
- Jeremy Bisley as Gower
- Joby Blanshard as Jamy
- Michael Graham Cox as Macmorris
- Robert Lang as Montjoy

=== "The Band of Brothers" ===
- First transmitted: 4 August 1960
- Running time: 60 minutes
- Content: Henry V from Act 4, Scene 0 onwards (beginning with the Chorus describing Henry's undercover surveillance of his camp).
- William Squire as Chorus
- Robert Hardy as King Henry the Fifth
- John Ringham as Duke of Gloucester
- Patrick Garland as Duke of Bedford
- Gordon Gostelow as Sir Thomas Erpingham
- George A. Cooper as Pistol
- Jeremy Bisley as Gower
- Kenneth Farrington as Fluellen
- Terry Wale as Court
- Tony Garnett as Bates
- Frank Windsor as Williams
- Joby Blanshard as Jamy
- Michael Graham Cox as Macmorris
- Jerome Willis as Duke of Orléans
- John Warner as The Dauphin
- George Selway as Constable of France
- Leon Shepperdson as Rambures
- Terence Lodge as Le Fer
- Adrian Brine as Duke of Bourbon
- Julian Glover as Earl of Westmoreland
- Noel Johnson as Duke of Exeter
- David Andrews as Earl of Salisbury
- Robert Lang as Montjoy
- John Greenwood as Duke of York
- Timothy Harley as Boy
- Anthony Valentine as English Herald
- Alan Rowe as King of France
- Stephanie Bidmead as Queen of France
- Edgar Wreford as Duke of Burgundy
- Judi Dench as Katherine
- Yvonne Coulette as Alice

=== "The Red Rose and the White" ===
- First transmitted: 25 August 1960
- Running time: 60 minutes
- Content: a heavily condensed version of 1 Henry VI.
- Alterations: as this is the only episode in the series which adapts an entire play, truncation is much more liberal here than elsewhere. The most obvious difference is the complete removal of Talbot, the ostensible protagonist of the play. The characters of Burgundy and Edmund Mortimer have also been removed, and dialogue is heavily cut from every scene. All of the battle scenes from France have also been removed and the episode concentrates almost entirely on the political disintegration in England.
- Patrick Garland as Duke of Bedford
- John Ringham as Duke of Gloucester
- Noel Johnson as Duke of Exeter
- Robert Lang as Cardinal of Winchester
- John Greenwood as Messenger
- Terry Wale as Messenger
- John Murray-Scott as Messenger
- Jerome Willis as The Dauphin
- Anthony Valentine as Duke of Alanson
- John Warner as Regnier
- David Andrews as Bastard of Orléans
- Eileen Atkins as Joan la Pucelle
- Julian Glover as Warder
- Jeremy Bisley as Warder
- Timothy Harley as Servingman
- Derek Ware as Servingman
- Kenneth Farrington as Servingman
- Leon Shepperdson as Woodvile
- Michael Graham Cox as Lord Mayor
- Jack May as Duke of York
- Edgar Wreford as Earl of Suffolk
- Alan Rowe as Duke of Somerset
- Frank Windsor as Earl of Warwick
- Tony Garnett as Vernon
- John Greenwood as Lawyer
- Terry Scully as King Henry the Sixth
- Mary Morris as Margaret
- Michael Graham Cox as Shepherd
- Barbara Grimes as Dancer

=== "The Fall of a Protector" ===
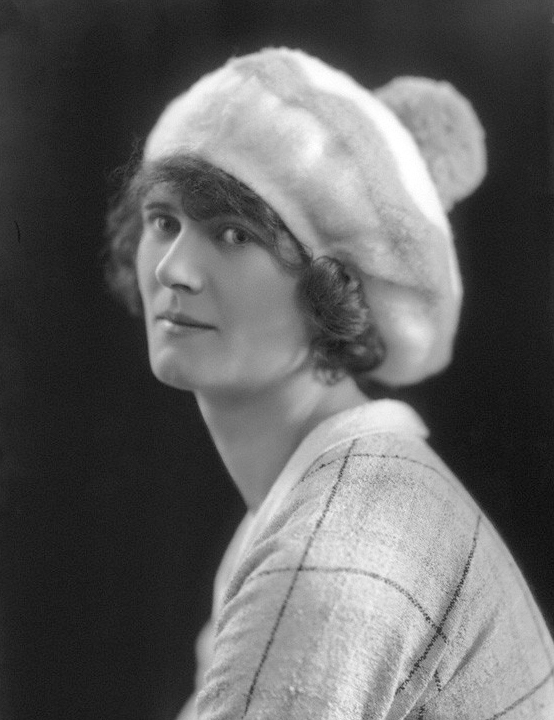
Nan Marriott-Watson in 1922. She appeared in a single episode, portraying "Mother Jordan".

- First transmitted: 8 September 1960
- Running time: 60 minutes
- Content: 2 Henry VI Acts 1, 2 and Act 3, Scene 1 (up to York's soliloquy regarding the fact that he now has troops at his disposal and his revelation of his plans to use Jack Cade to instigate a popular rebellion).
- Alterations: Peter Thump does not kill Thomas Horner during the combat; he compels him to confess by sitting on him, and Horner is promptly arrested.
- Edgar Wreford as Duke of Suffolk
- Terry Scully as King Henry the Sixth
- Mary Morris as Margaret
- John Ringham as Duke of Gloucester
- Robert Lang as Cardinal Beaufort
- Gordon Gostelow as Earl of Salisbury
- Frank Windsor as Earl of Warwick
- Jack May as Duke of York
- Kenneth Farrington as Duke of Buckingham
- Alan Rowe as Duke of Somerset
- Nancie Jackson as Duchess of Gloucester
- John Greenwood as Messenger
- Patrick Garland as John Hume
- David Andrews as Petitioner
- Anthony Valentine as Petitioner
- Derek Ware as Peter
- Julian Glover as An Armourer
- Terence Lodge as Bolingbroke
- Jeremy Bisley as Southwell
- Nan Marriott-Watson as Mother Jordan
- John Murray-Scott as A Spirit
- Timothy Harley as A Citizen
- John Warner as Simpcox
- Audrey Noble as Wife to Simpcox
- Jerome Willis as Mayor
- Leon Shepperdson as Beadle
- Tony Garnett as Neighbour
- Anthony Valentine as Neighbour
- Terry Wale as Neighbour
- Timothy Harley as Prentice
- John Greenwood as Prentice
- Jeffry Wickham as Sheriff
- Jerome Willis as Sir John Stanley
- Tony Garnett as A Post

=== "The Rabble from Kent" ===
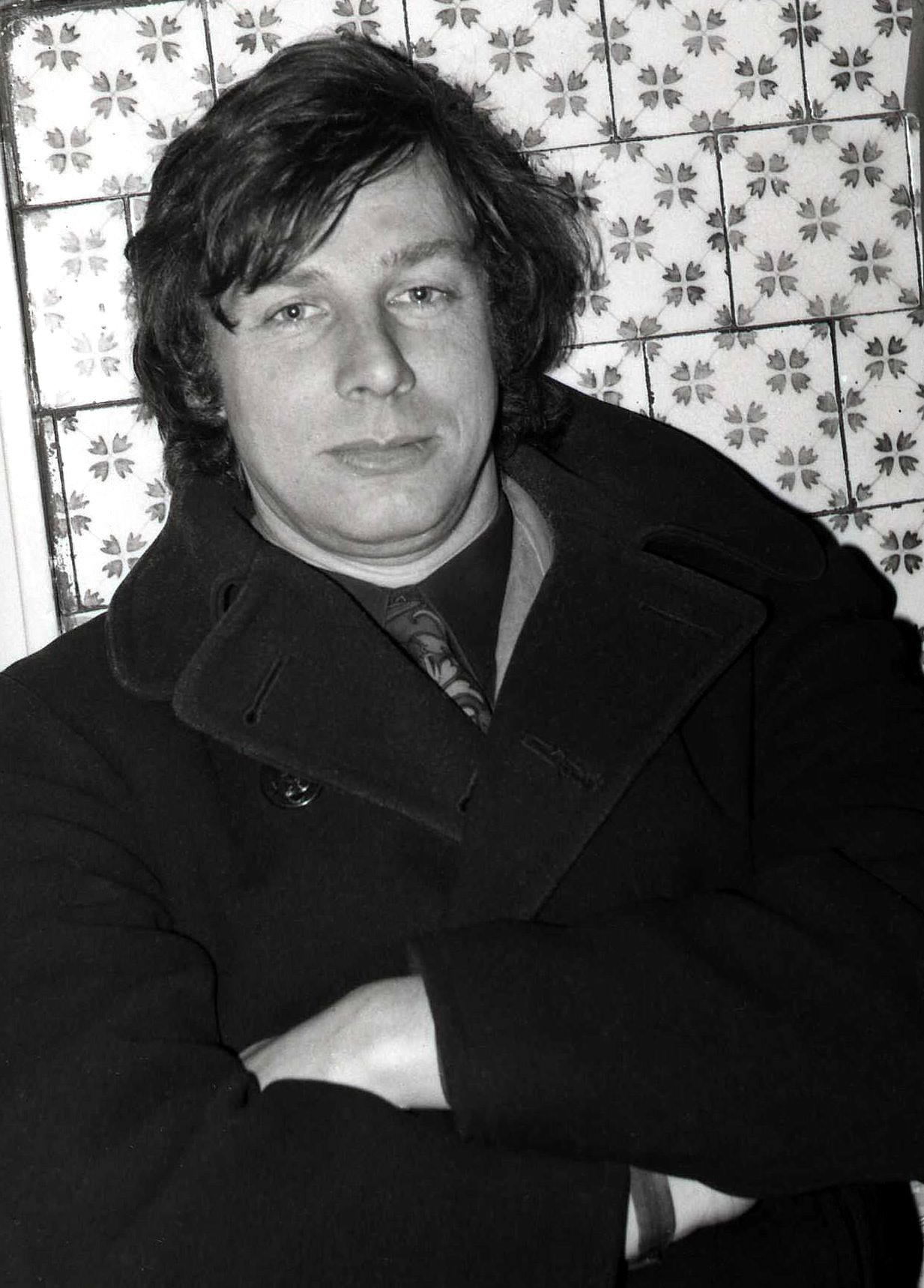
Patrick Garland in 1969. Having played the important role of Henry V's brother John, Duke of Bedford in the early episodes, Garland played the equally important role of Richard III's brother George, Duke of Clarence in later episodes.

- First transmitted: 22 September 1960
- Running time: 60 minutes
- Content: 2 Henry VI from Act 3, Scene 2 onwards (beginning with the murder of the Duke of Gloucester).
- Alterations: the murder of Gloucester is shown, whereas in the text, it happens off-stage. The characters of both George Plantagenet and Edmund Plantagenet are introduced just prior to the First Battle of St Albans, whereas in the text, neither character is introduced until 3 Henry VI (Edmund in Act 1, Scene 3; George in Act 2, Scene 2). Additionally, Edmund is played by an adult actor, whereas in the text, he is a child. Buckingham is killed on screen. In the text, his fate remains unknown until the opening lines of 3 Henry VI, where it is revealed he was killed by Edward.
- John Ringham as Duke of Gloucester
- Terence Lodge as Murderer
- Adrian Brine as Murderer
- Patrick Garland as Murderer
- Edgar Wreford as Duke of Suffolk
- Terry Scully as King Henry the Sixth
- Mary Morris as Queen Margaret
- Robert Lang as Cardinal Beaufort
- Alan Rowe as Duke of Somerset
- Frank Windsor as Earl of Warwick
- Gordon Gostelow as Earl of Salisbury
- John Murray-Scott as Vaux
- David Andrews as A Sea-Captain
- John Ringham as Master
- Derek Ware as Master's Mate
- John Greenwood as Gentleman
- Jeremy Bisley as Gentleman
- Adrian Brine as Walter Whitmore
- Timothy Harley as George Bevis
- Tony Garnett as John Holland
- Esmond Knight as Jack Cade
- Anthony Valentine as Dick the Butcher
- Terence Lodge as Smith the Weaver
- Terry Wale as The Clerk
- Barry Jackson as Michael
- Leon Shepperdson as Sir Humphrey Stafford
- John Murray-Scott as Brother to Stafford
- Kenneth Farrington as Duke of Buckingham
- John Warner as Lord Say
- John Greenwood as Messenger
- Jeremy Bisley as Messenger
- Derek Ware as Soldier
- John Barcroft as Lord Clifford
- Jerome Willis as Young Clifford
- Jeffry Wickham as Alexander Iden
- Jack May as Duke of York
- Julian Glover as Edward
- Patrick Garland as George
- Paul Daneman as Richard
- Terry Wale as Edmund

=== "The Morning's War" ===
- First transmitted: 6 October 1960
- Running time: 60 minutes
- Content: 3 Henry VI Acts 1, 2 and Act 3, Scenes 1 and 2 (up to Richard's soliloquy wherein he vows to attain the crown).
- Alterations: the character of Edmund, Earl of Rutland is played by an adult actor, whereas in the text, he is a child. Additionally, Margaret is present during his murder, and we see her wipe his blood on the handkerchief which she later gives to York; in the text, Margaret does not witness the murder. During the Battle of Towton, Richard fights and kills Clifford, whereas in the text, they fight, but Clifford flees and is mortally wounded off-stage when hit by an arrow.
- Frank Windsor as Earl of Warwick
- Jack May as Duke of York
- Julian Glover as Edward IV
- Patrick Garland as George, Duke of Clarence
- Paul Daneman as Richard, Duke of Gloucester
- Adrian Brine as Marquess of Montague
- Jeffry Wickham as Duke of Norfolk
- Terry Scully as King Henry the Sixth
- Kenneth Farrington as Earl of Northumberland
- Jerome Willis as Lord Clifford
- Leon Shepperdson as Earl of Westmoreland
- Terence Lodge as Duke of Exeter
- Mary Morris as Queen Margaret
- John Greenwood as Prince of Wales
- Derek Ware as Gabriel
- Anthony Valentine as Sir John Mortimer
- Terry Wale as Rutland
- John Murray-Scott as Messenger
- Tony Garnett as Messenger
- David Andrews as A Son
- John Ringham as A Father
- Timothy Harley as Sinklo
- John Warner as Humphrey
- Jane Wenham as Lady Elizabeth Grey
- Jeremy Bisley as Nobleman

=== "The Sun in Splendour" ===
- First transmitted: 20 October 1960
- Running time: 60 minutes
- Content: 3 Henry VI from Act 3, Scene 3 onwards (beginning with Margaret's visit to Louis XI of France).
- Alterations: Edward is rescued from his imprisonment by Richard and Lord Stafford, whereas in the play, he is rescued by Richard, Lord Hastings and Lord Stanley. Warwick is killed during the Battle of Barnet by George, whereas in the text, he is carried onto stage mortally wounded by Edward. Also, the end of the episode differs slightly from the end of the play. After Edward expresses his wish that all conflict has ceased, a large celebration ensues. As the credits roll, Richard and George stand to one side, and George almost slips into a barrel of wine, only to be saved by Richard. As George walks away, Richard muses silently to himself and then smiles deviously at the camera.
- John Warner as King Lewis XI
- Tamara Hinchco as Lady Bona
- Mary Morris as Queen Margaret
- John Greenwood as Edward, Prince of Wales
- Robert Lang as Earl of Oxford
- Frank Windsor as Earl of Warwick
- Anthony Valentine as Post
- Paul Daneman as Richard, Duke of Gloucester
- Patrick Garland as George, Duke of Clarence
- Alan Rowe as Duke of Somerset
- Julian Glover as King Edward the Fourth
- Jane Wenham as Queen Elizabeth
- John Ringham as Watchman
- Timothy Harley as Watchman
- Kenneth Farrington as Lord Rivers
- David Andrews as Lord Hastings
- Edgar Wreford as Lord Stafford
- Derek Ware as Huntsman
- Terry Scully as King Henry the Sixth
- Gareth Tandy as Henry Tudor, Earl of Richmond
- John Murray-Scott as Messenger to King Henry
- Jeffry Wickham as Mayor of York
- Jerome Willis as Sir John Montgomery
- Terry Wale as Soldier
- Terence Lodge as Duke of Exeter
- Timothy Harley as Messenger to Warwick
- Jeremy Bisley as Messenger to Warwick
- Tony Garnett as Sir John Somerville
- Adrian Brine as Marquess of Montague
- Leon Shepperdson as Messenger to Queen Margaret

=== "The Dangerous Brother" ===
- First transmitted: 3 November 1960
- Running time: 60 minutes
- Content: Richard III Acts 1, 2 and Act 3, Scene 1 (up to Richard promising Buckingham the Dukedom of Hereford).
- Alterations: the character of Lord Grey is not portrayed as Queen Elizabeth's son, but simply as a kinsman; only Dorset is her son. In the text, although there is some confusion and overlapping regarding the two characters in the early scenes, in the latter half of the play, they are both depicted as her sons. As the closing credits roll, there is a scene of Richard watching the Princes sleeping; there is no such scene in the text.
- Paul Daneman as Richard, Duke of Gloucester
- Patrick Garland as George, Duke of Clarence
- Frank Windsor as Brackenbury
- David Andrews as Lord Hastings
- Jill Dixon as Lady Anne
- John Greenwood as A Gentleman
- Terry Scully as King Henry VI
- Kenneth Farrington as Earl Rivers
- Leon Shepperdson as Lord Grey
- Jane Wenham as Queen Elizabeth
- Edgar Wreford as Duke of Buckingham
- Jack May as Lord Stanley
- Mary Morris as Queen Margaret
- John Ringham as Catesby
- Robert Lang as Murderer
- Terry Wale as Murderer
- Julian Glover as King Edward IV
- Anthony Valentine as Marquess of Dorset
- Alan Rowe as Ratcliff
- Violet Carson as Duchess of York
- Jeffry Wickham as Archbishop of York
- Michael Lewis as Richard, Duke of York
- Terence Lodge as Messenger
- Hugh Janes as King Edward V
- John Sharp as Lord Mayor
- Jerome Willis as Cardinal Bourchier

=== "The Boar Hunt" ===
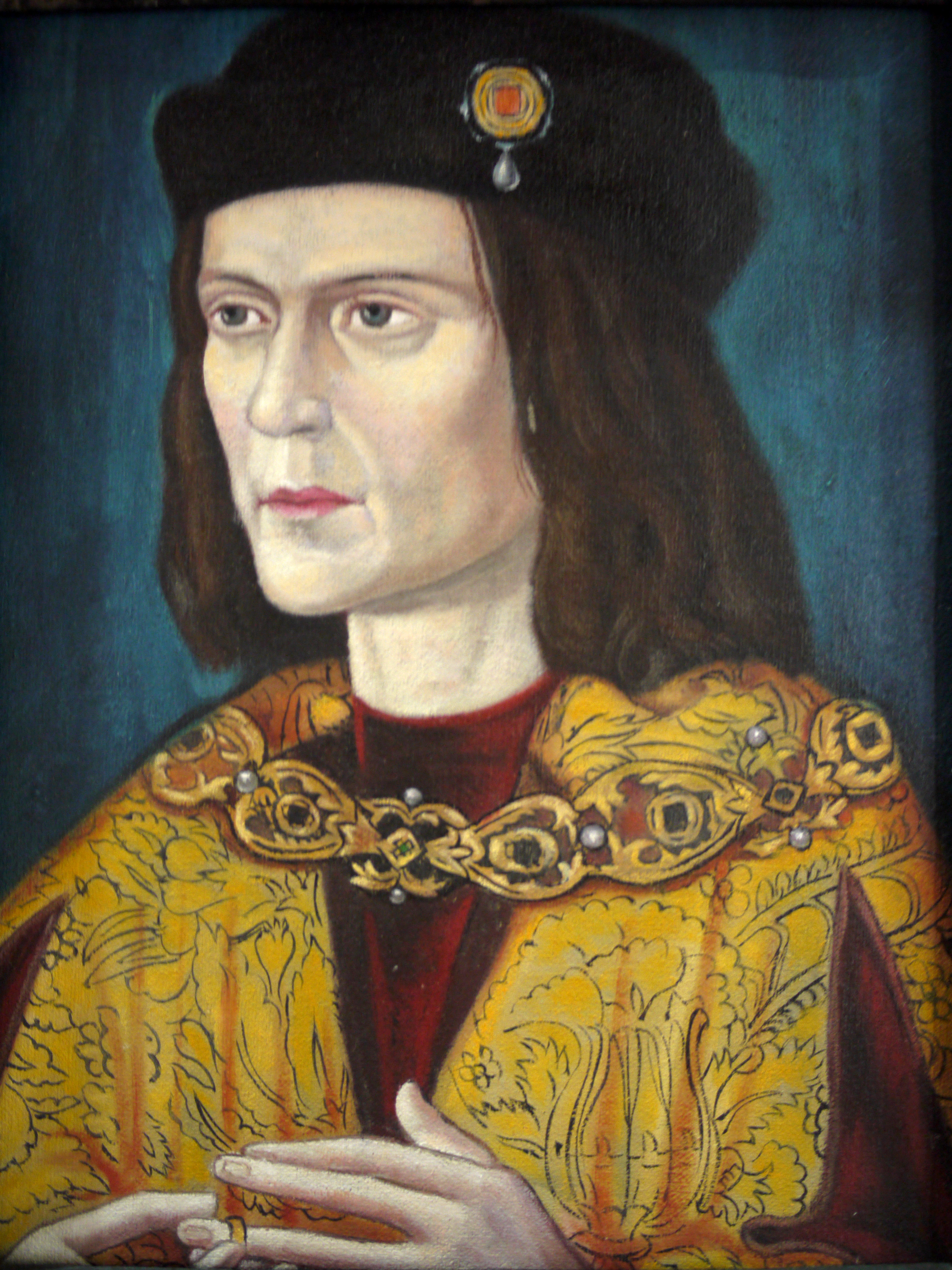
Richard III was portrayed in An Age of Kings by Paul Daneman. In a 1953 production of the tetralogy at the Birmingham Repertory Theatre directed by Douglas Seale, Daneman had played one of Richard's royal predecessors, Henry V.

- First transmitted: 17 November 1960
- Running time: 75 minutes
- Content: Richard III from Act 3, Scene 1 onwards (beginning with Stanley's messenger arriving at Hastings' house).
- Alterations: the scrivener's lamentation regarding the illegality of Hasting's execution is presented in the form of a plea as he attempts to convince two citizens to join him and speak out against Richard's actions; in the text, his speech is delivered as a soliloquy. The two priests between whom Richard stands as the Lord Mayor urges him to become King are not real priests, but two servants dressed up as priests. As Richard ascends to the throne for the first time, he stumbles, and has Buckingham help him into the chair; there is no such scene in the play. As in most filmed versions up to this point (such as the 1912 The Life and Death of King Richard the Third and Laurence Olivier's 1955 Richard III), the ghosts appear only to Richard, whereas in the text they appear to both Richard and Richmond.
- John Greenwood as A Messenger
- David Andrews as Lord Hastings
- John Ringham as Sir William Catesby
- Jack May as Lord Stanley, Earl of Derby
- Jeremy Bisley as A Priest
- Edgar Wreford as Duke of Buckingham
- Alan Rowe as Sir Richard Ratcliff
- Kenneth Farrington as Earl Rivers
- Leon Shepperdson as Lord Grey
- Robert Lang as Sir Thomas Vaughan
- Frank Pettingell as Bishop of Ely
- Adrian Brine as Lord Lovell
- Paul Daneman as King Richard the Third
- John Sharp as Lord Mayor
- Terry Wale as Scrivener
- Violet Carson as Duchess of York
- Jill Dixon as Queen Anne
- Jane Wenham as Queen Elizabeth
- Anthony Valentine as Marquess of Dorset
- Frank Windsor as Sir Robert Brackenbury
- Timothy Harley as A Page
- Terence Lodge as Sir James Tyrell
- Timothy Harley as Messenger
- Derek Ware as Messenger
- John Murray-Scott as Messenger
- Terry Wale as Sir Christopher Urswick
- Jerome Willis as Henry Tudor, Earl of Richmond
- Julian Glover as Earl of Oxford
- Michael Wells as Sir Walter Herbert
- Jeffry Wickham as Sir James Blount
- Noel Johnson as Duke of Norfolk
- Barry Jackson as Earl of Surrey
- John Greenwood as Ghost of Prince Edward
- Terry Scully as Ghost of King Henry the Sixth
- Patrick Garland as Ghost of Clarence
- Hugh Janes as Ghost of King Edward the Fifth
- Michael Lewis as Ghost of Richard of York

== See also ==
- The Spread of the Eagle (1963)
- The Wars of the Roses (1963; 1965)
- BBC Television Shakespeare (1978–1985)
- Shakespeare: The Animated Tales (1992–1994)
- ShakespeaRe-Told (2005)
- The Hollow Crown (2012; 2016)
