= Jane Wenham (actress) =

English actress (1927–2018)

- Born: Ann Jane Wenham Figgins; 26 November 1927; Southampton, England
- Died: 15 November 2018 (aged 90)
- Occupation: Actress
- Years active: 1954–1992, 2010
- Spouse: Albert Finney (m. 1957; div. 1961)
- Children: 1

Ann Jane Wenham Figgins (26 November 1927 – 15 November 2018), known professionally as Jane Wenham, was an English movie and television actress born in Southampton, Hampshire.

Wenham made her movie debut in the adaptation of J. B. Priestley's An Inspector Calls (1954). From 1957 to 1961, she was married to the actor Albert Finney, with whom she had a son, Simon, who is a cameraman.

Her radio appearances include ' Thirty Minute Theatre's ' The Chatter-Upper ', (BBC Radio 4, 1970), with Dinsdale Landen.

Wenham died in November 2018, at age 90.

== Filmography ==
=== Film ===
Year	Title	Role	Notes
1954	An Inspector Calls	Eva Smith	
1954	The Teckman Mystery	Ruth Wade	
1955	Make Me an Offer	Dobbie	

=== Television ===
Year	Title	Role	Notes
1953	Who Dotes Yet Doubts	Carol Airdley	TV film
1953–1956	Sunday Night Theatre	Various	9 episodes
1958	One Man Absent	Jane Peters	TV film
1959	Saturday Playhouse	Beth	Episode: "It Isn't Enough"
1960	BBC Sunday-Night Play	Laura Simmons	Episode: "Young Woodley"
1960	Suspense	Mattilda Loisel	Episode: "Payment in Full"
1960	ITV Play of the Week	Margaret Anderson	Episode: "Reputation for a Song"
1960	An Age of Kings	Queen Elizabeth	Episodes: "Henry VI: Parts 4 & 5", "Richard III: Parts 1 & 2"
1961	Persuasion	Mrs. Smith	Episode: "1.4"
1962	They Hanged My Saintly Billy	Annie Brookes	TV film
1962	Saki	Louisa Mebbin	Episode: "1.5"
1963	It Happened Like This	Erica	Episode: "Fer-de-Lance"
1963	The Spread of the Eagle	Portia	Episodes: "Julius Caesar: Parts 1 & 2"
1963	Sergeant Cork	Ivy Strong	Episode: "The Case of the Soldier's Rifle"
1963	Teletale	Lou Parker	Episode: "The Black Madonna"
1966	Theatre 625	Mathilde	Episode: "Conquest: The Encounter"
1967	The Wednesday Play	Monica Bryant	Episode: "Dismissal Leading to Lustfulness"
1968–1970	Hector's House	Zaza	78 episodes
1970	Thirty-Minute Theatre	Avis Mallows	Episode: "Waugh on Crime"
1970, 1979	ITV Playhouse	Judy Trotter, Nelma	Episodes: "Arthur Wants You for a Sunbeam", "The Winkler"
1972	Six Faces	Edna Chapple	Episode: "True Life"
1972	The Strauss Family	Mrs. Pruckmayr	TV miniseries
1975	Rooms	Liz	Episodes: "Mr. Cotgrove & Miss Hicks: Parts 1 & 2"
1975	Shades of Greene	Frau Puckler	Episode: "The Root of All Evil"
1976	Porridge	Mrs. Jamieson	Episode: "The Desperate Hours"
1977	Last of the Summer Wine	Lydia	Episode: "Jubilee"
1977–78	The Sunday Drama	Mrs. Lomax, Nora	Episodes: "Why Here?", "Alphabetical Order"
1979	Testament of Youth	Mrs. Brittain	TV miniseries
1980	General Hospital	Ethel Marshall	1 episode
1980	Enemy at the Door	Louise Gardner	Episode: "War Game"
1981	Bergerac	Edith Furneaux	Episode: "Campaign for Silence"
1982	Something in Disguise	Myrtle Hanger-Davies	Episodes: "One Fine Day", "An Old Devil"
1982–83	Nanny	Dolly Partridge	Episodes: "A Twist of Fate", "The Home Front"
1985	By the Sword Divided	Mrs. Lambe	Episodes: "Witch Hunt", "Fateful Days"
1985	Black Silk	Mrs. Drummond	Episode: "Without Prejudice"
1986	Anastasia: The Mystery of Anna	Sophie	TV film
1991	The Darling Buds of May	Aunt Bridget	Episode: "When the Green Buds Laugh: Part 1"
1991	A Perfect Hero	Mrs. Hobbs	Episode: "1.3"
1992	Old Boy Network	Margery White	Episode: "Dances with Moles"
1992	Inspector Morse	Judith Haines	Episode: "The Death of the Self"
2010	Downton Abbey	Mrs. Bates	Episode: "1.7"
