= The Spread of the Eagle =

1963 BBC television drama series

- Genre: Drama; Tragedy; History
- Written by: William Shakespeare
- Directed by: Peter Dews
- Country of origin: United Kingdom
- Original language: English
- No. of series: 1
- No. of episodes: 9

Production
- Producer: Peter Dews

Original release
- Network: BBC Television Service
- Release: 3 May – 28 June 1963

The Spread of the Eagle is a nine-part serial adaptation of three sequential history plays of William Shakespeare, Coriolanus, Julius Caesar, and Antony and Cleopatra, produced by the BBC in 1963. It was inspired by the success of An Age of Kings (1960), which it was unable to rival. The episodes also aired in West Germany in 1968-69 and in 1972.

The series was recorded directly to film, and so preserved by the BBC Film Library, meaning all episodes still exist.

== The episodes ==
=== "The Hero" ===
- First transmitted: 3 May 1963
- Running time: 50 minutes
- Content: Coriolanus, Acts I and II.

Cast

- Robert Hardy as Caius Martius Coriolanus
- Roland Culver as Menenius Agrippa
- Beatrix Lehmann as Volumnia
- Frank Pettingell as Junius Brutus
- Bernard Lloyd as Citizen
- Terry Wale as Citizen
- Michael Graham Cox as Citizen
- Paul Bailey as Citizen
- Roy Herrick as Messenger
- Maurice Colbourne as Roman Senator
- Noel Johnson as Cominius
- Roger Croucher as Titus Lartius
- Peter Jeffrey as Sicinius Velutus
- David King as Volsce Senator
- Paul Harris as Volsce Senator
- Jerome Willis as Tullus Aufidius
- Jennifer Daniel as Virgilia
- Hilary Wright as Gentlewoman
- Mary Steele as Valeria
- John Greenwood as Messenger
- Raymond Clarke as Roman Soldier
- David Weston as Roman Soldier
- Leonard Cracknell as Roman Soldier
- Ben Harte as Roman Soldier
- Geoffrey Hinsliff as Roman Soldier
- Charles Laurence as Roman Lieutenant
- John Barcroft as Lieutenant to Aufidius
- Hugh Dickson as The Aedile

=== "The Voices" ===
- First transmitted: 10 May 1963
- Running time: 50 minutes
- Content: Coriolanus, Acts II, III, and IV.

Cast

- Robert Hardy as Caius Martius Coriolanus
- Roland Culver as Menenius Agrippa
- Beatrix Lehmann as Volumnia
- Frank Pettingell as Junius Brutus
- Maurice Colbourne as Roman Senator
- John Gay as Roman Senator
- Peter Jeffrey as Sicinius Velutus
- Noel Johnson as Cominius
- Paul Webster as Officer
- David King as Officer
- Bernard Lloyd as Citizen
- Terry Wale as Citizen
- Michael Graham Cox as Citizen
- Paul Bailey as Citizen
- Raymond Clarke as Citizen
- Bernard Finch as Citizen
- Barry Jackson as Citizen
- Roger Croucher as Titus Lartius
- Hugh Dickson as The Aedile
- Ben Harte as The Aedile
- Jennifer Daniel as Virgilia

=== "The Outcast" ===
- First transmitted: 17 May 1963
- Running time: 50 minutes
- Content: Coriolanus, Acts IV and V.

Cast

- Robert Hardy as Caius Martius Coriolanus
- Roland Culver as Menenius Agrippa
- Beatrix Lehmann as Volumnia
- Frank Pettingell as Junius Brutus
- Raymond Clarke as Volsce Citizen
- Paul Bailey as Serving-man
- Charles Laurence as Serving-man / Volsce Conspirator
- David Weston as Serving-man / Volsce Conspirator
- Jerome Willis as Tullus Aufidius
- Peter Jeffrey as Sicinius Velutus
- Bernard Lloyd as Ritiyeno
- Terry Wale as Ritiyeno
- Michael Graham Cox as Ritiyeno
- Hugh Dickson as The Aedile
- Ben Harte as The Aedile
- John Greenwood as Messenger
- Roy Herrick as Messenger
- Noel Johnson as Cominius
- John Barcroft as Lieutenant to Aufidius
- Paul Harris as Volsce Sentry
- Barry Jackson as Volsce Sentry
- Jennifer Daniel as Virgilia
- Mary Steele as Valeria
- Kirk Martin as Young Martius
- Geoffrey Hinsliff as Messenger
- Roger Croucher as Messenger
- Maurice Colbourne as Roman Senator
- Leonard Cracknell as Volsce Conspirator
- David King as Volsce Lord
- John Gay as Volsce Lord
- Bernard Finch as Volsce Lord

=== "The Colossus" ===
- First transmitted: 24 May 1963
- Running time: 50 minutes
- Content: Julius Caesar, Acts I and II.

Cast

- Keith Michell as Mark Antony
- Peter Cushing as Caius Cassius
- Barry Jones as Julius Caesar
- Paul Eddington as Marcus Brutus
- Hugh Dickson as Flavius
- David Weston as A Carpenter
- David King as Marullus
- Terry Wale as A Cobbler
- Jack May as Casca
- Yvonne Bonnamy as Calpurnia
- Paul Webster as A Soothsayer
- John Gay as Cicero
- Roy Herrick as Lucius
- John Barcroft as Trebonius
- Jerome Willis as Decius Brutus
- Roger Croucher as Cinna
- Leonard Cracknell as Metellus Cimber
- Jane Wenham as Portia
- Bernard Finch as Caius Ligarius

=== "The Fifteenth" ===
- First transmitted: 31 May 1963
- Running time: 50 minutes
- Content: Julius Caesar, Acts II, III, and IV.

Cast

- Keith Michell as Mark Antony
- Peter Cushing as Caius Cassius
- Barry Jones as Julius Caesar
- Paul Eddington as Marcus Brutus
- David William as Octavius Caesar
- John Greenwood as a servant to Caesar
- Yvonne Bonnamy as Calpurnia
- Jerome Willis as Decius Brutus
- Bernard Lloyd as Publius
- Jack May as Casca
- Bernard Finch as Caius Ligarius
- John Barcroft as Trebonius
- Paul Bailey as Artemidorus
- Jane Wenham as Portia
- Roy Herrick as Lucius
- Paul Webster as a soothsayer
- Paul Harris as Popilius Lena
- Roger Croucher as Cinna
- Leonard Cracknell as Metellus Cimber
- Terry Wale as a servant to Antony
- Charles Laurence as a servant to Octavius Caesar
- Geoffrey Hinsliff as Plebeian
- David Weston as Plebeian
- Barry Jackson as Plebeian
- Ben Harte as Plebeian
- Hugh Dickson as Cinna, a poet
- Brian Oulton as Lepidus

=== "The Revenge" ===
- First transmitted: 7 June 1963
- Running time: 50 minutes
- Content: Julius Caesar, Acts IV and V.

Cast

- Keith Michell as Mark Antony
- Peter Cushing as Caius Cassius
- Barry Jones as Julius Caesar
- Paul Eddington as Marcus Brutus
- David William as Octavius Caesar
- Roger Croucher as Lucilius
- Charles Laurence as Pindarus
- Paul Webster as Soldier
- Raymond Clarke as Soldier
- Roy Herrick as Lucius
- Hugh Dickson as Titinius
- John Gay as A Poet
- John Barcroft as Messala
- Paul Harris as Varro
- Ben Harte as Claudius
- Terry Wale as A Messenger
- David Weston as Cato
- Barry Jackson as Soldier
- Paul Bailey as Soldier
- Geoffrey Hinsliff as Clitus
- John Greenwood as Dardanius
- David King as Volumnius
- Bernard Lloyd as Strato

=== "The Serpent" ===
- First transmitted: 14 June 1963
- Running time: 50 minutes
- Content: Antony and Cleopatra, Acts I and II.

Cast

- Keith Michell as Mark Antony
- Mary Morris as Cleopatra
- George Selway as Domitius Enobarbus
- David William as Octavius Caesar
- Charles Laurence as Philo
- David Weston as Demetrius
- Jill Dixon as Charmian
- John Barcroft as Alexas
- Paul Bailey as A Soothsayer
- Lucy Young as Iras
- John Greenwood as Messenger from Sicyon
- Brian Oulton as Lepidus
- Leonard Cracknell as Messenger to Caesar
- David King as Mardian
- Jerome Willis as Pompey
- Barry Jackson as Menecrates
- Geoffrey Hinsliff as Menas
- Ben Harte as Varrius
- John Gay as Maecenas
- Alan Rowe as Agrippa
- Nancie Jackson as Octavia
- Hugh Dickson as Messenger to Cleopatra
- Terry Wale as Eros
- Roger Croucher as Dolabella
- Bernard Lloyd as Scarus

=== "The Alliance" ===
- First transmitted: 21 June 1963
- Running time: 50 minutes
- Content: Antony and Cleopatra, Acts II, III, and IV.

Cast

- Keith Michell as Mark Antony
- Mary Morris as Cleopatra
- George Selway as Domitius Enobarbus
- David William as Octavius Caesar
- Jerome Willis as Pompey
- Brian Oulton as Lepidus
- Geoffrey Hinsliff as Menas
- Alan Rowe as Agrippa
- Nancie Jackson as Octavia
- John Barcroft as Alexas
- Jill Dixon as Charmian
- Lucy Young as Iras
- Hugh Dickson as Messenger
- Terry Wale as Eros
- John Gay as Maecenas
- David Weston as Canidius
- Paul Harris as Taurus
- Bernard Lloyd as Scarus
- Roger Croucher as Dolabella
- David King as An Ambassador
- Charles Laurence as Thidias
- John Greenwood as Servant to Cleopatra

=== "The Monument" ===
- First transmitted: 28 June 1963
- Running time: 50 minutes
- Content: Antony and Cleopatra, Acts IV and V.

Cast

- Keith Michell as Mark Antony
- Mary Morris as Cleopatra
- George Selway as Domitius Enobarbus
- David William as Octavius Caesar
- Terry Wale as Eros
- Geoffrey Hinsliff as A Soldier
- Jill Dixon as Charmian
- Lucy Young as Iras
- Alan Rowe as Agrippa
- Ben Harte as Messenger to Caesar
- Barry Jackson as A Soldier of Caesar's
- Bernard Lloyd as Scarus
- John Greenwood as A Centurion
- Paul Webster as Sentry
- Roy Herrick as Sentry
- David King as Mardian
- Charles Laurence as Dercetas
- Leonard Cracknell as Guardsman
- John Barcroft as Guardsman
- Bernard Finch as Guardsman
- Paul Harris as Guardsman
- David Weston as Diomedes
- Hugh Dickson as An Egyptian
- Roger Croucher as Dolabella
- John Gay as Maecenas
- Paul Bailey as A Clown

== In popular culture ==
In July 1963, comedian Jimmy Edwards spoofed the series in an episode of More Faces of Jim entitled "Spreadeagling".
