= Peter Dews (director) =

English stage director

Peter Dews (26 September 1929, Wakefield, Yorkshire, England – 25 August 1997) was an English stage director.

== Biography ==
Born and educated in Wakefield, Yorkshire he then took an M.A. at University College, Oxford. After two years teaching history he joined the BBC, in Birmingham, working first in radio (it is thought that he was the director of the episode of The Archers which featured the death of Grace Archer in a fire, a spoiler for the opening of independent television) and then television, as a director. He won the BAFTA 'Best Director' Award in 1960 for An Age of Kings, a television adaptation of Shakespeare's history plays. He subsequently directed Shakespeare's Roman plays in the series The Spread of the Eagle.

After a period of freelance theatre work he joined the Birmingham Repertory Theatre as Artistic Director in the autumn of 1965, in its original building - the first purpose built repertory theatre in the UK - and remained in that post until the company moved to the new venue in 1971, leaving in 1972, his last production there being the double-bill of Sophocles Oedipus the King and Sheridan's The Critic with Derek Jacobi in both plays' leading roles. Previously his productions of Shakespeare's As You Like It and Peter Luke's Hadrian VII had transferred from the old Birmingham Rep to London's West End, the latter going on to New York gaining Dews a Tony Award for its direction. Other notable productions at the Rep included Hamlet, with Richard Chamberlain in 1969, Quick, Quick Slow (1969) a musical by Monty Norman and Julian More, based on a play by David Turner, who also scripted the musical, and The Sorrows of Frederick, an epic play about Frederick the Great by Romulus Linney, in 1970.

At the Chichester Festival Theatre he guest-directed, amongst other productions, Antony and Cleopatra with Sir John Clements and Margaret Leighton, and the original production of Robert Bolt's Vivat! Vivat Regina! which transferred to London's West End and Broadway. Dews succeeded Keith Michell as the fourth artistic director of the Chichester Festival Theatre in 1978 and directed three Festival seasons. One notable production during this period was Julius Caesar in Puritan costume suggesting the plotting of the Gunpowder Plot. He also directed he original production of Royce Ryton's Crown Matrimonial, about the 1936 Abdication crisis, in the West End, with Wendy Hiller as Queen Mary. He also directed productions in the USA, Canada, South Africa, Israel, Malta, Éire and Hong Kong. In the UK he also directed A Midsummer Night's Dream at Nottingham Playhouse, the Scottish Theatre Company's production of Bertolt Brecht's Life of Galileo which toured Scottish theatres in the autumn of 1985 (he directed the play again in Birmingham), and Ian Curteis' Inferno at Greenwich Theatre.
