= Terry Scully =

British actor (1932–2001)

- Scully in the Public Eye episode "Twenty Pounds of Heart and Muscle"
- Born: Terence Scully; 13 May 1932; Leigh, Lancashire, England
- Died: 17 April 2001 (aged 68); Warminster, Wiltshire, England
- Occupation: actor

Terry Scully (13 May 1932 – 17 April 2001) was a British theatre and television actor.

== Early life ==
Leaving school at 14, Scully became an odd-job boy in a local engineering works. Having vague ideas of becoming a concert pianist, he studied playing the piano in his spare time but after passing his ARCM exam at 16, he gave up piano lessons. For four years, he worked as a bus conductor on the Manchester to Liverpool route.

Scully was invited to an audition with the Leigh Company Players after a member was impressed with his reading of a speech from Macbeth. He ended up playing leads with the company before going for an audition at Bristol Old Vic Drama School. So impressed with him, they persuaded Lancashire County Council to give Scully a grant to enable him to study. This was followed by performing with companies in Nottingham and Birmingham.

== Career ==
After making his name in the theatre, from the 1960s onwards he became more known for TV work. In 1960 he starred in the BBC's production of An Age of Kings, playing King Henry VI in several episodes.

Other notable roles for Scully were as Horatio Nelson in the 1968 television series Triton, and as Bicket in the BBC's 1967 blockbuster adaptation of The Forsyte Saga. He also appeared in Goodbye Gemini, Dixon of Dock Green, Z-Cars, Softly, Softly, Callan, Public Eye, The Venturers, and Angels.

Like many actors of his generation, he is now probably best remembered for his roles in cult TV series. He appeared in the Doctor Who serial The Seeds of Death, the Blake's 7 episode "Dawn of the Gods" and starred as Vic Thatcher in four episodes of the 1970s series Survivors. During his time on that series, Scully suffered a nervous breakdown. As a result, his role was filled by actor Hugh Walters in subsequent episodes.

In 2001, Scully died of a stroke, aged 68.
