= John Warner (actor) =

British actor (1924–2001)

John Warner in The Cruel Sea (1953)

John Hickson Warner (1 January 1924 – 19 May 2001) was a British film, television and stage actor whose career spanned more than five decades. His most famous role was that of Timothy Dawes in Salad Days, which premiered in the UK at the Theatre Royal in 1954, and transferred to the Vaudeville Theatre in London in the same year.

== Early years ==
Born the son of a clergyman in George in South Africa, Warner was educated at Brighton College after his family returned to Britain in 1929. He decided to become an actor while watching his father in an amateur production of the play Berkeley Square on Worthing Pier. His first job in 1939 was at the Little Theatre in Bristol. After service in the Royal Navy during the Second World War on board HMS Rattlesnake (he rose to the rank of Lieutenant), which included working on the Russian convoys, he resumed his acting career.

== Film and television ==
His first television appearance was in 1946. Later television appearances include The Winslow Boy (1958), Duty Bound (1958), Sunday Night Theatre (BBC, 1950–1958), Ivanhoe (1958), BBC Sunday-Night Play (1960), An Age of Kings (1960), Softly, Softly (1966), The Man in Room 17 (1966), Theatre 625 (1967), Doctor in the House (1969), Paul Temple (1969), Comedy Playhouse (1970), The Rivals of Sherlock Holmes (1971), The Unpleasantness at the Bellona Club (1972), Son of the Bride (1973), Doctor in Charge (1973), Prince Regent (1979) and Cribb (1980).

He played 'Tolly' Tolliver in 18 episodes of Potter (1979–1983) starring Arthur Lowe, and the Reverend Austin Doyle in 14 episodes of the sitcom Terry and June between 1979 and 1987.

Other television appearances include The Treaty (1991), Agatha Christie's Poirot (1992), Lovejoy (1992), Mr. Bean (1992), Shakespeare: The Animated Tales (1992–94) and Desmond's (1994).

Warner's film appearances include The Cruel Sea (1953), Isadora (1968), Sunday Bloody Sunday (1971), The Trouble with 2B (1972), Got It Made (1974), Little Dorrit (1987) and Without a Clue (1988).

== Theatre ==
Warner's first Shakespearean role was that of the Chief Fairy in a production of The Merry Wives of Windsor directed by Tyrone Guthrie in 1942. He appeared in Peter Brook's productions of Romeo and Juliet and Love's Labour's Lost at the Royal Shakespeare Theatre in 1947. In the 1950s Warner spent some years at the Bristol Old Vic when it regularly transferred productions to the Old Vic. In 1951 he played Osric and Reynaldo to Alec Guinness's Hamlet at the New Theatre in London.

Warner created the role of Timothy Dawes in Salad Days which premiered in the UK at the Theatre Royal in Bristol in June 1954, and transferred to the Vaudeville Theatre in London on 5 August 1954, running for 2,283 performances to become the longest-running show in musical theatre history until overtaken by My Fair Lady in the US (1956) and Oliver! in the UK (1960). He appeared in A Man of Distinction at the New Theatre in 1957.

Other stage appearances included Canon Fulbert in Ronald Millar's Abelard and Heloise at Wyndham's Theatre (1970), the RSC's Becket and The Taming of the Shrew (both 1961), Shaw's Widowers' Houses at the Theatre Royal Stratford East (1965) and Ring Round the Moon at the Haymarket Theatre (1968). Warner played 'Rattie' four times in productions of Toad of Toad Hall, and he regularly appeared at the Chichester Festival from 1978.

With the London Shakespeare Group he went on an international tour of Twelfth Night, which travelled through Pakistan, Jordan and Iraq in 1974. He acted in Guys and Dolls at the National Theatre in 1982, and in London Assurance (1989).

For a period he lived at 5 Thayer Street in Marylebone. He was the Vice-President of the Actors' Benevolent Fund.

John Warner died of heart attack on 19 May 2001 in Canterbury, Kent aged 77. He never married.

== Filmography ==
| Year | Title | Role | Notes |
|---|---|---|---|
| 1953 | The Cruel Sea | Baker | |
| 1959 | The Captain's Table | Henry Lomax | |
| 1959 | A Midsummer Night's Dream | Egeus | Voice |
| 1968 | Isadora | Mr. Stirling | |
| 1971 | Sunday Bloody Sunday | Judge Alex W.Langley | |
| 1972 | The Trouble with 2B | Dr Wital Fugir | |
| 1974 | Got It Made | Rafe Carter Welsh | |
| 1987 | Little Dorrit | Ben Gerard | |
| 1988 | Without a Clue | Peter Giles | |
| 1990 | The Fool | Gilles Henry Meyer | |
