= The Day Christ Died =

- Genre: Drama
- Written by: Edward Anhalt; James Lee Barrett
- Directed by: James Cellan Jones
- Starring: Chris Sarandon
- Music by: Laurence Rosenthal
- Country of origin: United States
- Original language: English

Production
- Producer: Martin Manulis
- Production location: Tunisia
- Cinematography: Franco Di Giacomo
- Editor: Barry Peters
- Running time: 142 minutes
- Production company: 20th Century Fox Television
- Budget: $2.8 million

Original release
- Network: CBS
- Release: March 26, 1980

The Day Christ Died is a 1980 American television film directed by James Cellan Jones, and produced by 20th Century Fox and CBS-TV. A dramatization of the last 24 hours of Jesus Christ's life, it is based on Jim Bishop's 1957 book of the same name. The book was co-adapted by James Lee Barrett, who, 15 years prior, had scripted The Greatest Story Ever Told for George Stevens.

Bishop disowned the adaptation and had his name removed from the credits. He called the film "cheap revisionist history", and even tried unsuccessfully to change the film's title. The Day Christ Died was filmed in Tunisia, at a cost of US$2.8 million. It was broadcast by CBS-TV on Wednesday, March 26, 1980.

== Plot ==
In Jerusalem, a popular mob hero named Barabbas is arrested and convicted by Pontius Pilate. Jesus of Nazareth arrives for the celebration of the Passover Seder. The High Priest Caiaphas and the Sanhedrin, who consider Jesus to be a menace and danger to their traditions, secretly bargain with Pilate to detain Jesus. A mob demands Barabbas' release. The Sanhedrin’s machinations provide Pilate an opportunity to avoid a riot. The Sanhedrin condemns Jesus and delivers him to Pilate for punishment. Pilate offers a choice to the populace: in honor of the holy day, he will stay the execution of one prisoner; will they choose Barabbas or Jesus?

== Cast ==
- Chris Sarandon as Jesus Christ
- Colin Blakely as Caiaphas
- Keith Michell as Pontius Pilatus
- Jonathan Pryce as Herod Antipas
- Barrie Houghton as Judas
- Tim Pigott-Smith as Tullius
- Jay O. Sanders as Simon Peter
- Eleanor Bron as Mary
- Delia Boccardo as Mary Magdelene
- Hope Lange as Claudia Procula
- Oliver Cotton as John
- Rod Dana as Abenadar
- Gordon Gostelow as Nicodemus
- Nando Paone as Thaddeus
- Samuele Cerri as Nathaniel
