= Edgar Wreford =

English actor (1923-2006)

- in The Avengers : Box of Tricks (1963)
- Born: Edgar Silvanus Wreford; 29 December 1923; London, England
- Died: 20 January 2006 (aged 82); Denville Hall, Northwood, London, England

Edgar Wreford (29 December 1923 – 20 January 2006) was an English stage and television actor.

== Biography ==
He trained at the Old Vic School and went on to have a long and distinguished career on stage.

His television roles included guest appearances in The Avengers, Van der Valk, Edward the Seventh, Lillie and Blake's 7.

Wreford spent his final years at the actors retirement home Denville Hall, where he died in 2006 after a long battle with Parkinson's disease.

== Partial filmography ==
- Suspended Alibi (1957) – Prison Chaplain
- An Age of Kings (1960) – John of Gaunt
- The Knack ...and How to Get It (1965) – Man in Phone Booth
