= Gordon Gostelow =

Australian actor (1925–2007)

- Spotlight photo
- Born: Gordon Massey Gostelow; 14 May 1925; Wellington, New Zealand
- Died: 3 June 2007 (aged 82); London, England
- Occupation: Actor
- Years active: 1954–1999
- Spouse: Vivian Pickles (m. 1964)
- Children: 1

Gordon Massey Gostelow (14 May 1925 – 3 June 2007) was an Australian actor. He was educated in Australia at North Sydney Boys High School and Sydney University where he graduated in Economics.

Gostelow went to England in 1950 and worked in the theatre (regional repertory), including the Royal Shakespeare Company and various roles on British television. In Shakespeare he was especially associated with the role of the alcoholic reprobate Bardolph in the Henriad plays. He played the character on television in both An Age of Kings in 1960 and in the BBC Television Shakespeare's version of the plays in 1979. He also played several other roles in the former production, but was said to have been "born" to play Bardolph.

He played the parts of Perks in the 1968 TV serial of The Railway Children, Milo Clancey in the Doctor Who serial The Space Pirates in 1969, and the Duke of Medina Sidonia in Elizabeth R. Between 1969 and 1970 he also narrated in twelve episodes of BBC children's television series Jackanory. In 1984, he took the part of Alf Battle in the supermarket sitcom Tripper's Day. He appeared in a 1999 episode of Midsomer Murders, entitled "Death's Shadow".

His film career included roles in Dr. Syn, Alias the Scarecrow (1963), The Idol (1966), Nicholas and Alexandra (1971), The Day Christ Died (1980, as Nicodemus), The Scarlet Pimpernel (1982), and How to Get Ahead in Advertising (1989).

== Filmography ==
Year	Title	Role	Notes
1963	Dr. Syn, Alias the Scarecrow	Ben	
1964	Gideons Way episode Fall High Fall Hard	Thompson	
1966	The Idol	Simon	
1966	The Spy with a Cold Nose	Reporter	Uncredited
1969	In Search of Gregory	Old Man	
1970	Wuthering Heights		
1971	Nicholas and Alexandra	Guchkov	
1977	The Stick Up	Farmer	
1980	The Day Christ Died	Nicodemus	
1981	Lady Killers	Charles Burnham	Episode: "My Perfect Husband"
1982	The Scarlet Pimpernel	Duval	TV movie
1989	How to Get Ahead in Advertising	Priest	
