= George Selway =

English actor (1924–1994)

- Selway in The Avengers in 1965
- Born: Henry George Selway; 21 February 1924; Marylebone, London, England
- Died: May 1994 (aged 70); Camden, Greater London, England
- Occupation: Actor
- Years active: 1945–1980
- Television: Beryl's Lot
- Spouses: Vanda Godsell (m. 1954; div. 1957) Patricia Greene (m. 1959, divorced)

Henry George Selway (21 February 1924 – May 1994), known professionally as George Selway, was an English actor. With a career that spanned 35 years, he was best known for his portrayal of Tom Humphries in the third series of the ITV comedy drama, Beryl's Lot (1976–1977).

== Early life ==
Henry George Selway was born in Marylebone, London, England on 21 February 1924, as the only child to Henry Selway and his wife, Ann "Annie" (née Gartland).

== Career ==
In the 1939 England and Wales Register, Selway's occupation was listed as actor. He began his career on stage on 14 March 1945, playing Geoffrey in a production of Great Day. He made his television debut on 27 November 1947, with the role of Fred in the television film Saloon Bar. He made his broadcasting debut on 26 March 1955, as the voice of Tony Lumpkin in the BBC Home Service programme Saturday Night Theatre. He made his film debut on 27 May 1957, with the role of Paddy in the crime film The Secret Place.

Selway took over the role of Tom Humphries in the ITV comedy drama series Beryl's Lot for the third series between 1976 and 1977. The character had previously been portrayed by Mark Kingston for the first two series'.

Selway retired on 19 July 1980, following his role as Geoffrey Fisher in the Nottingham Playhouse Theatre Company's production of Billy Liar.

== Personal life ==
Selway married his first wife, Vanda Godsell, an actress, in Marylebone, Middlesex in October 1954. The couple divorced in 1957, after two years of marriage.

Selway married his second wife, Patricia Greene, an actress, in Maidenhead, Berkshire in October 1959. The couple divorced a few years later.

Selway died in Camden, Greater London, in May 1994. He was 70.

== Filmography ==
=== Stage ===
Year	Title	Role	Production	Location
1945	Great Day	Geoffrey		Playhouse Theatre, London
1953	My Wife's Lodger	Tex Sebastian (an American Soldier)	Arts Council of Great Britain and Salisbury Arts Theatre Ltd	Salisbury Playhouse
1953	The Young Elizabeth	Lord Thomas Seymour	Arts Council of Great Britain and Salisbury Arts Theatre Ltd	Salisbury Playhouse
1953	One Wild Oat	Humphrey Proudfoot	Arts Council of Great Britain and Salisbury Arts Theatre Ltd	Salisbury Playhouse
1953	Lady Frederick	Mr. Paradine Fouldes	Arts Council of Great Britain and Salisbury Arts Theatre Ltd	Salisbury Playhouse
1953	Ten Minute Alibi	Philip Sevilla	Arts Council of Great Britain and Salisbury Arts Theatre Ltd	Salisbury Playhouse
1953	Waters of the Moon	Colonel Selby	Arts Council of Great Britain and Salisbury Arts Theatre Ltd	Salisbury Playhouse
1953	Wild Horses	Trumper Norton	Salisbury Arts Theatre Ltd	Salisbury Playhouse
1953	Beauty and the Beast	The Prince	Arts Council of Great Britain and Salisbury Arts Theatre Ltd	Salisbury Playhouse
1953	The Happy Prisoner	Fred Williams	Arts Council of Great Britain and Salisbury Arts Theatre Ltd	Salisbury Playhouse
1953	The River Lane	Philip Sturgess	Salisbury Arts Theatre Ltd	Salisbury Playhouse
1953	It Won't Be a Stylish Marriage	Cedric Donklin	Salisbury Arts Theatre Ltd	Salisbury Playhouse
1953	The Deep Blue Sea	Freddie Page	Salisbury Arts Theatre Ltd	Salisbury Playhouse
1953	Murder Mistaken	Edward Bare	Arts Council of Great Britain and Salisbury Arts Theatre Ltd	Salisbury Playhouse
1953	Love in a Mist	Nigel	Arts Council of Great Britain and Salisbury Arts Theatre Ltd	Salisbury Playhouse
1953–1954	Murder in the Cathedral			Bristol Old Vic - Theatre Royal
1953–1954	Winter Journey			Bristol Old Vic - Theatre Royal
1954	The Love of Four Colonels	The Wicked Fairy	Arts Council of Great Britain and Salisbury Arts Theatre Ltd	Salisbury Playhouse
1954	The Shoemaker's Holiday		Bristol Old Vic Company	Bristol Old Vic - Theatre Royal
1954	The Man in Grey	Swinton Rokeby	Arts Council of Great Britain and Salisbury Arts Theatre Ltd	Salisbury Playhouse
1956	The Crucible	John Willard	English Stage Company	Royal Court Theatre, London
1957	Morning Departure	Lt.-Cdr. Sanford, D.S.O., R.N. (Captain of S.14)	Salisbury Arts Theatre Ltd	Salisbury Playhouse
1958	The Brass Butterfly	Postumus		Strand Theatre, London and New Theatre, Oxford
1958	The Hamlet of Stepney Green	Mr Stone		Lyric Theatre (Hammersmith), London
1959	Twelfth Night	Sir Toby Belch	Meadow Players	Oxford Playhouse
1960	Gideon's Fear	Commander George Gideon	Salisbury Arts Theatre Ltd	Salisbury Playhouse
1960	The Bargain	Detective Sgt. Bruno		Theatre Royal, Bath and St Martin's Theatre, London
1961	A Man for All Seasons	Thomas Cromwell	Nottingham Playhouse Theatre Company	Nottingham Playhouse (Goldsmith Street)
1961–1962	Richard III			The Old Vic, London
1961–1962	Julius Caesar			The Old Vic, London
1961–1962	Inca			The Old Vic, London
1962	Julius Caesar	Casca	Old Vic Company	The Old Vic, London and UK Tour
1962	The Tempest	Caliban	Old Vic Company	The Old Vic, London and UK Tour
1962	The Tempest	Caliban	Old Vic Company	Lyceum Theatre, Sheffield
1963–1964	Coriolanus	Junius Brutus	Nottingham Theatre Trust Ltd	Nottingham Playhouse
1967	Rosencrantz and Guildenstern are Dead	T/O Extra	National Theatre	The Old Vic, London
1967	Three Sisters	T/O Orderly	National Theatre	The Old Vic, London
1967–1968	As You Like It	T/O First forest lord	National Theatre Company	The Old Vic, London
1968	Oedipus	Chorus	National Theatre	The Old Vic, London
1968	Edward II	T/O Extra	National Theatre	The Old Vic, London
1968	In His Own Write	Dad	National Theatre	The Old Vic, London
1968–1969	Love's Labour's Lost	A forester	National Theatre	The Old Vic, London
1969	'H' or Monologues at Front of Burning Cities	Captain Maud	National Theatre	The Old Vic, London
1969	Back to Methuselah: Part Two	U/S He-Ancient	National Theatre	The Old Vic, London
1973	Dear Brutus	Matey	Meadow Players	Oxford Playhouse
1974–1975	Henry V			Old Vic Tour
1974–1975	Henry IV, Parts I & II			Old Vic Tour
1979	The Servant of Two Masters	Pantalone	Wolsey Theatre Company	Wolsey Theatre, Ipswich
1979	Perchance to Dream	Sir Amyas Wendall	Wolsey Theatre Company	Wolsey Theatre, Ipswich
1979	The Eve of Saint Venus		Wolsey Theatre Company	Wolsey Theatre, Ipswich
1979	A Christmas Carol	Ebenezer Scrooge	Wolsey Theatre Company	Wolsey Theatre, Ipswich
1980	Spider's Web	Hugo Birch	Wolsey Theatre Company	Wolsey Theatre, Ipswich
1980	A Midsummer Night's Dream	Robin Starveling, Moonshine	Wolsey Theatre Company	Wolsey Theatre, Ipswich
1980	Billy Liar	Geoffrey Fisher	Nottingham Playhouse Theatre Company	Nottingham Playhouse

=== Television ===
Year	Title	Role	Notes
1947	Saloon Bar	Fred	Television film
1948	Marigold	Mordan	Television film
1948	The Only Way	First citizen	Television film
1956	New Ramps for Old	Whaleback	2 episodes
1957	Frost at Midnight	George Bradmore, blacksmith	1 episode
1957	Television World Theatre	Earl of Westmoreland	Episode: "The Life of Henry V"
1959	Boyd Q.C.		Episode: "Rope's End"
1959	The Case of Private Hamp	Webb	Television film
1960	Scotland Yard	Detective Sergeant Morgan	Episode: "Used in Evidence"
1960	An Age of Kings	Constable of France	2 episodes
1963	The Spread of the Eagle	Domitius Enobarbus	3 episodes
1965–1972	Z-Cars	Dave Jessop, Uncle Willy, Stan Lowe	4 episodes
1965	A Tale of Two Cities	Defarge	9 episodes
1965	The Mask of Janus	Johnson	Episode: "And the Fish Are Biting"
1965	The Avengers	Massey	Episode: "Death at Bargain Prices"
1965	Serjeant Musgrave's Dance	Walsh	3 episodes
1965–1970	The Wednesday Play	Frank, Garfield	2 episodes
1966	Dixon of Dock Green	Brewster	Episode: "Bullion"
1966	Emergency Ward 10	Chief Instructor	Episode: "Episode #1.944"
1966–1967	Theatre 625	Giorgio Franzia, Robert Fitzwymarc	3 episodes
1967	Dr. Finlay's Casebook	Patient	Episode: "A Happy Release"
1967	Doctor Who	Frank Meadows, George Meadows	5 episodes
1967	Mickey Dunne	Mario Lombardi	Episode: "Are there any more at Home like You?"
1967	The Informer	Crawford	Episode: "The Sacrifice"
1967	Softly, Softly	Comben	Episode: "Material Evidence"
1967	The Gamblers	Lewis	Episode: "Tycoon of the Year"
1970	Paul Temple	Emilio Sarto	Episode: "Steal a Little Happiness"
1970	Play for Today	Workman	Episode: "The Hallelujah Handshake"
1971	Doomwatch	CID Sergeant	Episode: "The Logicians"
1971–1972	...And Mother Makes Five	Mr. Campbell	12 episodes
1972	Jason King	Sven	Episode: "Chapter One: The Company I Keep"
1974	Seven Faces of Woman	Uncle Stan	Episode: "Polly Put the Kettle On"
1976	Rogue Mule	Captain	Television film
1976–1977	Beryl's Lot	Tom Humphries	26 episodes
1978	All Creatures Great and Small	Soames	2 episodes
1978	Second City Firsts	Walter	Episode: "Shall I See You Now?"
1978	The Law Centre	Craig	Episode: "The Galahad Bit"
1979	Coronation Street	Frank Bebbington	2 episodes
1980	Heartland	Mr. Mason	Episode: "Family"
1980	The Gentle Touch	Hooper	Episode: "Shock"

=== Radio ===
Year	Title	Role	Station	Notes
1955	Saturday Night Theatre	Tony Lumpkin	BBC Home Service	Episode: "She Stoops to Conquer"
1957	Repertory in Britain	George Bradmore, blacksmith	BBC Home Service	Episode: "Frost at Midnight"
1958	The Thursday Play	Sam Baxter	BBC Home Service	Episode: "The Larford Lad"

=== Film ===
Year	Title	Role	Notes
1957	The Secret Place	Paddy	
1959	Tiger Bay	Det. Sgt. Harvey	
1959	I'm All Right Jack	Union Jack Workman	
1960	Bottoms Up	1st Man	
1961	House of Mystery	Constable	
1962	In the Doghouse	Journalist	Uncredited
1966	Sky West and Crooked	Police Sergeant	
1966	The Wrong Box	Railway Vanman	
1967	Maroc 7	Police Patrolman	
1968	The Strange Affair	Sgt. Clancy	
1970	Three Sisters	Orderly	
1972	Commuter Husbands	Charles Worth	
