= Magic Grandad =

- Genre: Children's
- Starring: Geoffrey Bayldon; Kristy Bruce; Georgi Fisher; Miriam Margolyes
- Country of origin: United Kingdom
- Original language: English
- No. of seasons: 6

Production
- Production companies: BBC Worldwide; Spelthorne Productions

Original release
- Network: BBC Two
- Release: 12 January 1993 – 18 June 2009

Magic Grandad is an educational programme which originally aired on the BBC Two Schools section Watch during 1995. The show saw Magic Grandad, played by Geoffrey Bayldon, take his young grandchildren, played by Kristy Bruce and James Moreno, back in time to see historical events and people such as the Great Fire of London or Florence Nightingale. Cheryl Hall also starred in the show as the children's mother.

The programme was said to make learning about history "fun for youngsters" and was aimed at children aged 4–7 years. During its peak, many schools in England used the show to teach young children about history. It was very popular and influential among primary school children. The programme ran for two series in 1993 and 1994, one themed around historical items and another themed around historical people, though it was repeated on TV for a number of years after it ended.

In 2003, a new version featuring a new cast was remade for BBC Two. In the years following the programme, a number of educational items were released in the UK including a CD-ROM entitled Magic Grandad's Seaside Holidays designed for Key Stage 1 pupils to learn about history in the same way the TV show taught them. Written by Susan Bolton, the disc is designed for Infant school teachers to teach pupils during history lessons.

In 2003, a new interactive version of the show was released on CD-ROM. In keeping with the original concept of the TV show before it, it allowed users to travel back in time whilst featuring the interactive elements described as extras. The main difference was that the cast now appeared in digital form.

The episodes that were shown in 2001 were the following of 1. "The Promenade" or billed "The Promenade And Souvenirs" on 19 January 2001, 2."The Beach" or billed "On The Beach" on 24 January 2001 and 3. "Entertainment" or billed "The Pier" on 31 January 2001 which starred Miriam Margolyes as Grandmama.
