= John Ringham =

English actor (1928–2008)

- Born: John Henry Ringham; 10 February 1928; Cheltenham, Gloucestershire, England
- Died: 20 October 2008 (aged 80); London, England
- Occupation: Actor
- Spouses: Elizabeth Shepherd (m. 1959; div. 1962); Hedwig Nowacki (m. 1966)
- Children: 4

John Henry Ringham (10 February 1928 – 20 October 2008) was an English actor who appeared on both television and stage. Among his roles was that of Norman Warrender in the 1980s sitcom Just Good Friends.

== Early life ==
Ringham was born on 10 February 1928 in Cheltenham, where his father was a travelling book salesman. He was educated at the Cheltenham Grammar School for Boys (now called Pate's Grammar School). As a teenager he was a member of a drama group run by a retired professional actor. He was then called up for national service and served from 1946 until 1948 in Mandatory Palestine.

After leaving the army Ringham spent four years as a member of a touring theatre company called The Compass Players based in Gloucestershire.

== Career ==
Ringham appeared throughout BBC Television's Shakespeare adaptation An Age of Kings in 1960, most prominently as Humphrey Duke of Gloucester, the brother of Henry the Fifth. Other appearances over the years include several parts in Z-Cars; Softly, Softly, and Barlow at Large; Flambards; Poldark; the War and Peace dramatisation in 1972; Birds of a Feather; The Bill; Bless Me Father; Taggart; Bergerac; The Tripods; Juliet Bravo; Minder; All Creatures Great and Small; Dixon of Dock Green; Dad's Army; Are You Being Served?; Catweazle; Up Pompeii!; The Avengers; The Piglet Files, When the Boat Comes In, London's Burning, Rosie (TV series), and Some Mothers Do 'Ave 'Em.

He played Inspector Lanner in the 1985 Sherlock Holmes adaptation of The Resident Patient. In Dad's Army he played two different characters – Private Bracewell in the pilot (he was set to become a major recurring character, but this was later dropped), then Captain Bailey in four later episodes.

Ringham appeared in Doctor Who three times, first as the bloodthirsty priest Tlotoxl in the story The Aztecs (1964). He returned in the stories The Smugglers (1966) and Colony in Space (1971).

He also appeared as the by-the-book Commander Tri-S in the unsold pilot of The Solarnauts, created by Roberta Leigh (1967).

== Playwright and author ==
Ringham was also a playwright and the author of three books, including a biography of the composer George Frideric Handel.

== Personal life and death ==
In 1959 he married Elizabeth Shepherd (marriage dissolved 1962), and in 1966 Hedwig Felizitas Nowacki (two sons, two daughters).

Ringham died of cancer on 20 October 2008, aged 80.

== Filmography ==
Year	Title	Role	Notes
1959	Ivy League Killers	Inspector	
1961	Very Important Person	P / O G S 'Plum' Pouding	
1964-1971	Doctor Who	Tlotoxl, Blake, Ashe	Serials: "The Aztecs", "The Smugglers", "Colony in Space"
1973	The Zoo Robbery	Smythe's associate	Uncredited
1976	The Twelve Tasks of Asterix	Additional Voices	Voice, English version
1978	The Ghosts of Motley Hall	Webster, Ludwig Stumpf	2 episodes
2005	V for Vendetta	Old Man	
