= Derek Ware (actor) =

British actor (1938–2015)

- Born: Derek Arthur Ware; 27 February 1938; Manchester, Lancashire, England
- Died: 22 September 2015 (aged 77); Eastbourne, East Sussex, England
- Occupations: Actor, stuntman

Derek Arthur Ware (27 February 1938 – 22 September 2015) was an English actor and stuntman, active from the late 1950s through the 1990s.

Ware's parents were Arthur, a music hall performer, and his wife Margaret. After graduating from RADA in 1957, his earliest television work was on the BBC's cycle of Shakespeare's history plays, An Age of Kings (1960), as both actor and stunt arranger. For the director Peter Watkins, Ware was involved in the production of the docudramas, Culloden (1964) and The War Game (1966), both for the BBC.

Ware was a stuntman and fight arranger for the early seasons of Doctor Who on which his company Havoc, founded in 1966, was involved as well as many other television shows into the 1970s, for both the BBC and ITV. The company entirely dominating the stunt work field for a time, but had been dissolved by the end of the 1970s. He worked on Z-Cars, the original The Italian Job (1969), in which he also played the role of Rozzer, and later, on EastEnders.

== Filmography ==
Year	Title	Role	Notes
1962	The Primitives	Philip	
1966	The Idol	Labourer	
1967	Far from the Madding Crowd	Corporal	
1968	Up the Junction	Ted's Friend	
1968	Witchfinder General	Boy at Hoxne Inn	
1969	The Italian Job	Rozzer	
1976	Shout at the Devil	German crewman	Uncredited
1976	The Battle of Billy's Pond	Driver's Mate	Children's Film Foundation
1978	Give Us Tomorrow	2nd Bank Robber	
1984	John Wycliffe: The Morning Star	Peasant #1	
1986	Sky Bandits	Alphonse	
1986	God's Outlaw	Friar Stafford	
1992	Revenge of Billy the Kid	PC Bob Peel	(final film role)
