= Roger Bolingbroke =

Astrologer and alleged necromancer, executed as witch

Roger Bolingbroke (died 18 November 1441) was a 15th-century English cleric, astronomer, astrologer, magister and alleged necromancer. He flourished in the first half of the 15th century. He was tried, convicted and executed for treasonable witchcraft on the person of Henry VI of England.

== Conspiracy ==
Bolingbroke was a person of great intelligence and learning. He was part of the household of Humphrey of Lancaster, 1st Duke of Gloucester, and was the personal clerk to Eleanor Cobham, the Duke's wife.

He was the best known of the three scholars implicated in the "conspiracy" to bring about the death of King Henry. He was described as a ‘gret and konnyng man in astronomye’ and ‘renowned in all the world’,

In October 1440 he and Thomas Southwell, the canon of St Stephen's Chapel, produced a horoscope for Eleanor Cobham which predicted the death of King Henry, an event, which, if it were to have happened, would have meant the Duke of Gloucester would have become King and Eleanor his Queen.

When the King heard of this prediction, The King’s Council charged Bolingbroke and Southwell, and another - John Home (or Hume), with conspiring to kill the King with necromancy.

In addition to these scholars, a woman known as Margery Jourdemayne was also implicated. Jourdemayne was known as "The Witch of Eye" and was engaged in the conspiracy to provide spells and potions. She and Bolingbroke were the only two to be executed for their parts in the affair.

== Charges ==
On 23 July 1441 Bolingbroke was brought before the Church authorities, and at St. Paul's Cross, London, he made a very public confession that his actions were not compatible with Christianity and he foreswore his diabolic activities.

Around this time Bolingbroke also appeared before the Kings Council and was accused of treason as well as sorcery. At this point he accused his mistress, Eleanor Cobham, as having directed his actions.

On 18 November of that year, Bolingbroke was brought from the Tower to the London Guildhall. The King's Commissioners found him guilty of various treasonable crimes. He was duly dragged on a hurdle that same day to Tyburn, where he was hanged, drawn and quartered. His head was displayed on London Bridge and his quartered body was distributed around the country.

== In literature ==
Bolingbroke appears in William Shakespeare's Henry VI, Part 2 as a conjurer, of the demon Asnath. The personages of the Duchess of Gloucester and Margery Jordan also accompany his Shakespearian appearance.

In Clive Barker's 1986 novella The Hellbound Heart, Frank Cotton mentions having read Bolingbroke's (fictional) diaries, wherein he found hints of the existence of the Cenobites.
