= Beryl's Lot =

British TV comedy drama series (1973–1977)

- Opening titles
- Genre: Comedy
- Written by: Kevin Laffan; Bill MacIlwraith; Charlie Humphreys
- Directed by: Derek Bennett; David Reynolds
- Starring: Carmel McSharry; Barbara Mitchell; Tony Caunter; Annie Leake; Norman Mitchell; Johnny Shannon; Robert Keegan; Mark Kingston; George Selway; Robin Askwith; Queenie Watts
- Country of origin: United Kingdom
- Original language: English
- No. of series: 3
- No. of episodes: 52

Production
- Producers: David Cunliffe; Peter Willes
- Running time: 26 x 60 mins 26 x 30 mins
- Production company: Yorkshire Television

Original release
- Network: ITV
- Release: 1 November 1973 – 24 June 1977

Beryl's Lot is a British comedy drama about a woman approaching middle-age and embarking on a programme of personal development. It was written by Kevin Laffan (who also created Emmerdale), produced by David Cunliffe and Peter Willes, and directed by Derek Bennett and David Reynolds for Yorkshire Television and broadcast on ITV between 1973 and 1977. Beryl's Lot ran for 3 series and 52 episodes in total before its cancellation. The first two series each consisted of 13 one-hour-long episodes, the third series of 26 episodes of 30 minutes.

== Plot ==
The series focused on Beryl Humphries, a Battersea milkman's wife and mother of three, who decided as her 40th birthday approached that she needed to broaden her horizons, which she accomplished by enrolling on a philosophy course at night school. The series dealt with how Beryl's new ideas, attitudes and outlook affected her family, friends and neighbours.

Beryl's Lot was inspired by the story of Margaret Powell (1907–1984), a former domestic servant who had undergone a similar journey of self-discovery and had written a series of bestselling books about her life experiences.

== Cast ==
- Carmel McSharry as Beryl Humphries
- Mark Kingston as Tom Humphries (series 1–2)
  George Selway as Tom Humphries (series 3)
- Barbara Mitchell as Vi Tonks
- Tony Caunter as Trevor Tonks
- Annie Leake as Wully Harris
- Johnny Shannon as Wacky Waters
- Robert Keegan as Horace Harris
- Robin Askwith as Fred Pickering (series 1–2)
- Queenie Watts as Freda Mills (series 1–2)
- Brian Capron as Jack Humphries
- Anita Carey as Babs Humphries
- Verna Harvey as Rosie Humphries
- Norman Mitchell as Charlie Mills

== Episodes ==
=== Series 1 (1973–1974) ===
- Getting Up (1 Nov 73)
- Quite a Reception (8 Nov 73)
- Box and Cox (15 Nov 73)
- Dancing Lessons (22 Nov 73)
- Definitely Very Chilly (29 Nov 73)
- Diamond Cut Diamond (6 Dec 73)
- Entente Cordiale (13 Dec 73)
- Sixes and Sevens (20 Dec 73)
- It's a Rum World (3 Jan 74)
- A Bit of Culture (10 Jan 74)
- Backs to the Wall (17 Jan 74)
- Naughty Boy, Naughty Girl (24 Jan 74)
- Rosie All the Way (31 Jan 74)

=== Series 2 (1975) ===
- After the Wedding Was Over (26 Sep 75)
- It's a Wise Child (3 Oct 75)
- Finders Keepers (10 Oct 75)
- Treble Chance (17 Oct 75)
- Charlie Is My Darling (24 Oct 75)
- Ignorance Is Bliss (31 Oct 75)
- The Last Straw (7 Nov 75)
- Easy Pickings (14 Nov 75)
- Stool Pigeon (21 Nov 75)
- Devil to Pay (28 Nov 75)
- Safety First (5 Dec 75)
- Home Again (12 Dec 75)
- A Day at the Races (19 Dec 75)

=== Series 3 (1976–1977) ===
- Episode 1 (31 Dec 76)
- Episode 2 (7 Jan 77)
- Episode 3 (14 Jan 77)
- Episode 4 (21 Jan 77)
- Episode 5 (28 Jan 77)
- Episode 6 (4 Feb 77)
- Episode 7 (11 Feb 77)
- Episode 8 (18 Feb 77)
- Episode 9 (25 Feb 77)
- Episode 10 (4 Mar 77)
- Episode 11 (11 Mar 77)
- Episode 12 (18 Mar 77)
- Episode 13 (25 Mar 77)
- Episode 14 (1 Apr 77)
- Episode 15 (8 Apr 77)
- Episode 16 (15 Apr 77)
- Episode 17 (22 Apr 77)
- Episode 18 (29 Apr 77)
- Episode 19 (6 May 77)
- Episode 20 (13 May 77)
- Episode 21 (20 May 77)
- Episode 22 (27 May 77)
- Episode 23 (3 Jun 77)
- Episode 24 (10 Jun 77)
- Episode 25 (17 Jun 77)
- Episode 26 (24 Jun 77)
