= Alan Rowe (actor) =

English actor (1926–2000)

- Born: 14 December 1926; Palmerston North, New Zealand
- Died: 21 October 2000 (aged 73); Kingston upon Thames, Surrey, England
- Occupation: Actor
- Partner: Geoffrey Bayldon

Alan Rowe (14 December 1926 – 21 October 2000) was an English actor born in New Zealand.

== Life and career ==
Rowe appeared in four Doctor Who serials between 1967 and 1980. His first role was Dr Evans in The Moonbase. His other roles in the show included Edward of Wessex in The Time Warrior, Colonel Skinsale in Horror of Fang Rock and Garif in Full Circle, which was his final Doctor Who appearance.

He took the major supporting role of William of Orange in the prizewinning 1969 BBC series The First Churchills, appearing in seven episodes. His other work included roles in Wycliffe, Inspector Morse, Rumpole of the Bailey, Minder, Forever Green, Young Charlie Chaplin, Lovejoy and BBC2 Playhouse.

Rowe died in Kingston upon Thames, Surrey on 21 October 2000, aged 73. His long-term partner, fellow actor Geoffrey Bayldon, died in 2017.

== Filmography ==
Year	Title	Role	Notes
1957	The Adventures of Robin Hood	Sir William	Episode: "To Be a Student"
1958	The Diary of Samuel Pepys	William Hewer	12 episodes
1960	An Age of Kings	Various Roles	
1967-1980	Doctor Who	Dr. Evans/Edward of Wessex/Skinsale/Garif	4 episodes
1967	The Forsyte Saga	Settlewhite	TV serial
1969	The Saint	Lafitre	Episode: "The Ex-King of Diamonds"
1969	The First Churchills	William of Orange	TV serial
1969	Taste of Excitement	Police Inspector	
1971	Say Hello to Yesterday	Waiter	Uncredited
1972	Henry VIII and His Six Wives	French Ambassador	
1978	Lillie	Dr. Lewis	TV serial
1980	The Tempest	Sebastian	
1980-1982	Tales of the Unexpected	Mr. Clements/Duncan Larch	2 episodes
1983	Number 10	Lord Briley	TV serial
1984	The First Olympics: Athens 1896	Edwin Edgerton	TV serial
1985	Emmerdale	Professor Smale	2 episodes
1986	Lovejoy	Malleson	2 episodes
1992	Inspector Morse	Alistair Haines	Episode: "The Death of the Self"
1997	Wycliffe	Minister	Episode: "Old Crimes, New Times"
