= Margery Jourdemayne =

English cowherd's wife and accused witch

Margery Jourdemayne, "the Witch of Eye Next Westminster" (before 1415 – 27 October 1441) was an English woman who was accused of "false belief and witchcraft". She was probably sentenced by a church court; no record survives confirming the charges. Edward Coke later claimed he had seen a document that she was burned De heretico comburendo. She was burned at the stake in Smithfield Market on 27 October 1441.

== Life ==
Margery was married to William Jourdemayne. Although nothing is known of her own family, her husband's family of Jourdemayne were well established and prosperous Middlesex yeomen from at least the end of the fourteenth century. The meaning of the surname is likely to have come from the Old French for a day labourer–jour de main.

=== Activity ===
From the early 1430s, Margery seems to have kept the company of a number of respected and learned clerics and courtiers, somewhat unusually for the wife of a cowherd.

Eleanor Cobham admitted at her trial to having long used Margery's services. It seems that this was a relationship of at least ten years. Eleanor also stated that she had sought Margery's help in becoming pregnant by her husband, Humphrey, Duke of Gloucester. It is likely that she and other ladies of the Court were well versed in Margery's profession.

In 1432 her fellow prisoners at Windsor Castle included friars and clerics, one of whom, Ashwell, was proficient in astronomy and would in June 1433 successfully forecast an eclipse.

Roger Bolingbroke was the best known of these scholars, described as a 'gret and konnyng man in astronomye' and 'renowned in all the world'.

Southwell, who was probably Eleanor's personal physician, was an eminent doctor of medicine, at home both at the royal court and in the city of London. He, together with Gilbert Kymer, Duke Humphry's own physician, and John Somerset, was among those who petitioned the mayor and city of London for the foundation of a college of physicians and surgeons in 1423. The following year, Kymer was Master of the college, and Somerset and Southwell were its two surveyors or wardens.

There is some evidence of other notables using Margery's skills, such as Edmund Beaufort, 2nd Duke of Somerset, who is said to have consulted Margery Jourdemayne, the celebrated witch of Eye, with respect to his conduct and fate during the impending conflicts. She told him that he would be defeated and slain at a castle: but as long as he arrayed his forces and fought in the open field, he would be victorious and safe from harm.

=== Case of 1432 ===
During the course of the 1441 trial, it was disclosed that Margery had been held for some months at Windsor Castle ten years previously for an unspecified offence concerning sorcery. In 1430, seven witches had been arrested in London and accused of plotting the young King Henry's death and were then imprisoned in the Fleet; it is possible that Margery was one of these seven.

In any event, on 22 November of that year one of the king's serjeants-at-arms was paid to escort 'a certain woman' from the city of London to Windsor, and six days later another serjeant was reimbursed for taking friar John Ashwell on the same journey. A subsequent writ directed payment to the lieutenant of Windsor Castle, John Wintershull, for his costs for keeping Friar John and Margery Jourdemayne, and their two gaolers, from 18th November 1430 to 9th May 1432. Another writ of July 1432 authorised payment to Wintershull for his costs... for keeping Margery and Ashwell.

On 9 May 1432, Margery, along with Friar John Ashwell and John Virley (clerk), was examined on charges of sorcery. Ashwell and Virley were discharged on their own recognisance, but Margery was released on condition of her future good behaviour and that she refrained from further witchcraft.

=== Case of 1441 ===
The case that led to the execution of Margery Jourdemayne has been well documented and discussed since the fifteenth century. Eleanor Cobham, Duchess of Gloucester, wife to Humphrey of Lancaster, 1st Duke of Gloucester, was charged with treasonable necromancy, along with four co-accused: Roger Bolingbroke, John Hume (or Home), Thomas Southwell and Margery stood accused of using witchcraft to bring about the death of Henry VI. (Cobham's husband was next in line to the throne.)

Three of the co-accused were scholars and clerics of the Duke's court. The fourth was Margery Jourdemayne, a woman of low birth, accused of "false belief and witchcraft" according to the chronicles.

At some point between July and September 1441, Margery was arrested by the king's men and taken to the Tower of London.

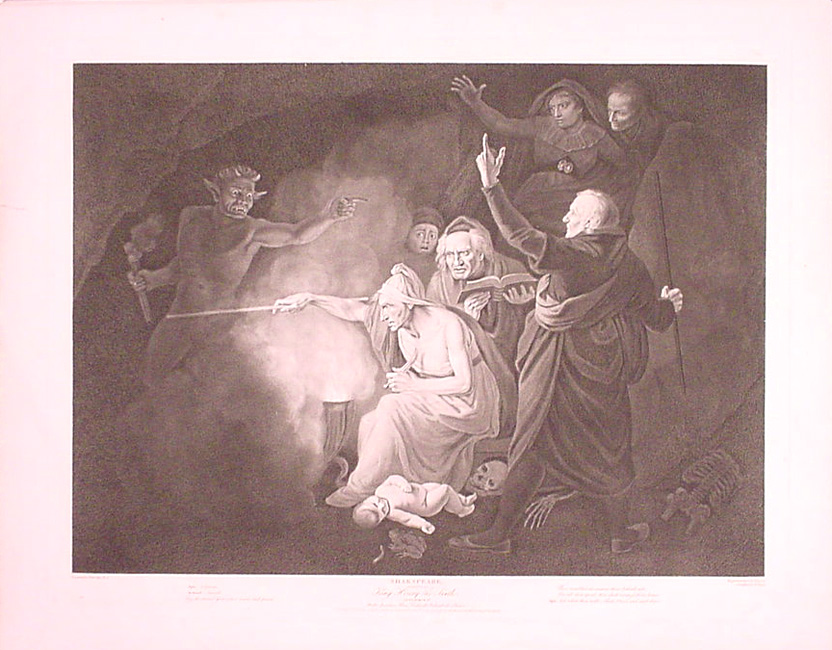
The Conjuration

Margery had for many years been known as someone who could provide spells and potions useful in advancing love and bringing about a pregnancy or ending one.

There was a Beldame [old woman] called the wytch of Ey,
Old mother Madge her neyghbours did hir name
Which wrought wonders in countryes by heresaye
Both feendes [fiends] and fayries her charmyng would obay
And dead corpsis from grave she could uprere
Suche an inchauntresse, as that tyme had no peere.

She was probably sentenced by a church court; no record survives confirming the charges. Edward Coke later claimed he had seen a document that she was burned De heretico comburendo. She was burned at the stake in Smithfield Market on 27 October 1441.

== In literature ==
Margery appears in William Shakespeare's Henry VI, Part 2, as Margery Jourdayn, along with her co-accused. She is also a character in Philippa Gregory's 2011 novel about Jacquetta of Luxembourg, The Lady of the Rivers and her 2026 novel about Eleanor Cobham, Royal Witch.

== In popular culture ==
Deborah Hyde, editor-in-chief to the UK magazine The Skeptic blogs and lectures about belief in the supernatural and other elements of folklore that involve superstition under the name "Jourdemayne".
