= Suspense (British TV series) =

1962–1963 British BBC TV series

Suspense was a 1962–1963 BBC thriller anthology drama series. The series featured John Carson, Alex Scott as Dr. John Field, Margaret John as assistant matron and Desmond Llewelyn. 49 episodes were made, only two of which survive in full in the archives. An additional episode is incomplete.
