= List of people from Ironton, Ohio =

This is a list of people who were born in, lived in, or are closely associated with the city of Ironton, Ohio.

== Athletics ==
- Coy Bacon, 3x Pro Bowler and member of the Black College Football Hall of Fame
- Terry Enyart, baseball player
- Ken Fritz, football player
- Bob Lutz, former football head coach
- George McAfee, member of the Pro Football Hall of Fame

== Arts and entertainment ==
- Bobby Bare, country music singer Country Music Hall of Fame Grammy Award winner
- Ritter Collett, Dayton sportswriter, winner of Spink Award from baseball's Hall of Fame
- Mickey Fisher, screenwriter
- Emily Jordan Folger, co-founder of the Folger Shakespeare Library
- David Lively, concert pianist
- Clint McElroy, podcaster, comic book writer, radio personality
- Butch Miles, legendary jazz drummer
- Betty Johnson, dubbed the "Black Widow" by the media for the murder of five of her husbands
- Gardner Rea, cartoonist
- Terry Waldo, pianist, bandleader and ragtime musician

== Education, politics and service ==
- Harlan Hatcher, eighth president of the University of Michigan
- Elza Jeffords, member of the US House of Representatives from Mississippi
- Mary Augusta Jordan, longtime English professor at Smith College
- Joseph Kimball (1836-1909), Civil War recipient of the Medal of Honor
- William C. Lambert, achieved the second-highest air victory totals for an American flying ace in World War I
- W. Terry McBrayer, Kentucky state legislature and politician
- William Henry Powell (1825-1904), Civil War recipient of the Medal of Honor; born in Wales and entered service in Ironton
- James Ancil Shipton, senior US Army officer
- Kelli Sobonya, politician
- Marion Tinsley (1927-1995), mathematician and checkers player; widely considered the greatest player of all-time

== Other ==
- Nannie Kelly Wright, only known female ironmaster
