= Christa Jansohn =

Christa Jansohn (born 1958) is a German scholar of English literature and culture. From 2001 to 2023 she held the Chair of British Culture at the University of Bamberg in Germany.

== Education ==
Christa Jansohn studied English, History and Archive Studies at the University of Bonn and the University of Exeter. She completed her MA and the first Staatsexamen in teacher training, before gaining her PhD and Habilitation, all at the University of Bonn.

== Career ==
Christa Jansohn was appointed to the Chair of British Culture at the University of Bamberg in 2001, a post she held until her retirement in 2023. Her scholarly work has focused primarily on the intersections between British Cultural Studies and older philological traditions, as well as on interdisciplinary approaches to these overlaps. She has made particular contributions in a number of different areas, including the reception of Shakespeare in Germany; D. H. Lawrence and his European reception; the relationship between literature and the history of science and medicine; the history of literary societies; scholarly editing (with a particular focus on Shakespeare and Lawrence); and translation studies.

She has been a full member of the Academy of Sciences and Literature, Mainz since 2005, and since 2011 she has served as Chair of the Academy’s Committee for English Literature. On the occasion of Shakespeare’s 450th birthday in 2014, she collaborated with fellow members of the Mainz Academy – including fellow Shakespeare scholar Werner Habicht – on the Shakespeare Album: a photographic album presenting 109 portraits and autograph signatures of personalities central to the propagation of German interest in Shakespeare over the centuries.

In 2019, she was appointed Chair of the Commission of Literature and Culture at the Academy; and in July 2019, she was elected a full member of the section of 'Literary and Theatrical Studies' in the Academia Europaea. She has also served on the Editorial Boards of the journals Archiv für das Studium der neueren Sprachen und Literaturen, Editionen in der Kritik and the Prague Journal of English Studies.

== Awards and honours ==
Christa Jansohn has been a Visiting Fellow of several colleges of the University of Cambridge, most recently Trinity (2005) and Churchill (2010–11, 2015–16). In 2009 she was a visiting fellow at CRASSH (Centre for Research in the Arts, Social Sciences, and Humanities), Cambridge.

Among other research sabbaticals at US institutions, she has been a Fulbright Fellow at New York University (1992); an Andrew W. Mellon Foundation Fellow at the Harry Ransom Humanities Research Center, University of Texas at Austin (1994); and an Eleanor M. Garvey Fellow in Printing and Graphic Arts at the Houghton Library, Harvard University (2016).

In 2004, she was awarded the Commerzbank Prize of the Academy of Sciences and Literature, Mainz, for her “wide-ranging and many-sided research activities, which have advanced and enriched dialogue with Anglo-Saxon scholarship”.

== Major publications ==
- Hans Mayer: Shakespeare und die Deutschen. Eine Sendefolge von Hans Mayer (WDR: 7. Juni bis 16. Juli 1964). Ed. Christa Jansohn, with an Introduction by Heinrich Bleicher (Studien zur englischen Literatur und Wissenschaftsgeschichte, 28). Münster: LIT, 2023.
- Die Shakespeare-Übersetzungen August Wilhelm Schlegels und des Tieck-Kreises: Kontext – Geschichte – Edition. Ed. Claudia Bamberg, Christa Jansohn and Stefan Knödler (Beihefte zu editio. Internationales Jahrbuch für Editionswissenschaft, 53). Berlin: De Gruyter, 2023.
- Kriegsende in Weimar 1945. Die thüringische Landeshauptstadt während der amerikanischen Besetzung im April/Mai 1945. Dokumente und Berichte, co-authored with Volker Wahl (Jena: Vopelius, 2020), pp. 376, including numerous illustrations and reproductions. ISBN 978-3-947303-20-5.
- "Brexit Means Brexit?' The Selected Proceedings of the Symposium, Akademie der Wissenschaften und der Literatur | Mainz, 6–8 December 2017. Ed. Christa Jansohn (Mainz: Akademie der Wissenschaften und der Literatur, 2018). Pp. 162. [Please click here for the online publication.]
- D. H. Lawrence: Lady Chatterley: Übersetzt von Georg Goyert. Ed. (1st edn) by Guido Huss and Christa Jansohn on the occasion of the fiftieth anniversary of the translator's death, with a Foreword by Christa Jansohn (E-Books: Kindle, Tolino, 2016). ISBN Nummer: Kindle (mobile format): 9783944561530, ISBN: Tolino (E-publication format): 9783944561523.
- "Bücher sind nur dickere Briefe an Freunde": Festgabe für Michael Knoche. 25 Jahre Bibliotheksdirektor der Herzogin Anna Amalia Bibliothek (1991-2016). Ed. Christa Jansohn und Freunde Michael Knoches (Studien zur englischen Literatur und Wissenschaftsgeschichte, 29). Münster: LIT, 2016. Pp. 265.
- Shakespeare unter den Deutschen. Ed. Christa Jansohn with Werner Habicht, Dieter Mehl, und Philip Redl (Stuttgart: Franz Steiner, 2015). Pp. 343.
- Shakespeare Jubilees on three Continents. Ed. Christa Jansohn and Dieter Mehl (Studien zur englischen Literatur, 27). Münster: LIT, 2015. Pp. 383.
- Shakespeare Album. Ed. Christa Jansohn and Werner Habicht, in cooperation with the Mainzer Akademie der Wissenschaften und der Literatur, Theatersammlung der Universität Köln, and the Shakespeare Library, University of Birmingham (Mainz: Akademie der Wissenschaften und der Literatur, 2014), pp. 150.
- Zu Pest und AIDS in der englischen Literatur. Stuttgart: Franz Steiner, 2012. Pp. 106. [Please click here for the online publication.]
- Eta Harich-Schneider: Die Sonette William Shakespeares und die Lyrik der "Rekusanten". Erlebnisse und Übersetzungen einer reisenden Musikerin: 1941-1982. Studien zur englischen Literatur, 25 (Münster: LIT-Verlag, 2011). Pp. 492 + 32 Illustr.
- Shakespeare without Boundaries. Festschrift in Honor of Dieter Mehl. Ed. Christa Jansohn, Lena Orlin, Stanley Wells (Newark: Delaware Press, 2011), Pp. 397.
- Shakespeare's World: World Shakespeare. The Selected Proceedings of the International Shakespeare Association World Congress, Brisbane 2006. Ed. Richard Fortheringham, Christa Jansohn, Robert White (Newark: Delaware Press, 2008). Pp. 436.
- The Reception of D.H. Lawrence in Europe. Ed. Christa Jansohn and Dieter Mehl. The Athlone Critical Tradition Series: The Reception of British Authors in Europe (London: Continuum International Publishing Group Ltd., 2007). Pp. xliii + 367.
- German Shakespeare Studies at the Turn of the Twenty-first Century. Ed. Christa Jansohn (Newark: Delaware Press, 2006). Pp. 308.
- In the Footsteps of William Shakespeare. Ed. Christa Jansohn. Studien zur englischen Literatur, 19 (Münster: LIT, 2005). Pp. vi + 295.
- Elizabeth I: Past and Present. Ed. Christa Jansohn. Studien zur englischen Literatur, 19 (Münster: LIT, 2004). Pp. vi + 295.
- Old Age and Ageing in British and American Culture and Literature. Ed. Christa Jansohn. Studien zur englischen Literatur, 16 (Münster: LIT, 2004). Pp. 265.
- Zweifelhafter Shakespeare. Zur Geschichte der Shakespeare-Apokryphen und ihrer Rezeption von der Renaissance bis zum 20. Jahrhundert (Studien zur englischen Literatur, 11). Münster: LIT, 2000. Pp. 447.
- Problems of Editing. Beihefte zur editio, 14. Ed. Christa Jansohn (Tübingen: Max Niemeyer, 1999). Pp. vii + 250.
- D.H. Lawrence: The First and Second Lady Chatterley Novels (The Cambridge Edition of the Letters and Works of D.H. Lawrence). Cambridge: Cambridge University Press, 1999. Pp. xl + 690. Part I: First Version (Jansohn); Second Version (Dieter Mehl).
- D.H. Lawrence: The Woman Who Rode Away and Other Stories (The Cambridge Edition of the Letters and Works of D.H. Lawrence). Cambridge: Cambridge University Press, 1995. Pp. lxv + 488 [together with Dieter Mehl]. - Also published in "Penguin Twentieth-Century Classics" (London, 1996).
- William Shakespeare: A Lover's Complaint. Deutsche Übersetzungen von 1787 bis 1894. Herausgegeben und eingeleitet von Christa Jansohn. Mit einem Vorwort von Wolfgang Weiß (Berlin: Erich Schmidt, 1993). Pp. 238 + 4 Abb.
- Shakespeares Sonette in der Übersetzung Dorothea Tiecks. Kritisch herausgegeben von Christa Jansohn (Francke Monographien). Tübingen: Francke, 1992. Pp. vii + 371
- Zitat und Anspielung im Frühwerk von D. H. Lawrence (Studien zur englischen Literatur, 1). Münster: LIT, 1990. Pp. ii + 298.
