= Edward Jordan (American lawyer) =

American lawyer (1820–1899)

Edward Jordan (October 6, 1820 – September 22, 1899) was an American lawyer who served as Solicitor of the United States Treasury.

== Biography ==
Jordan was born on October 6, 1820, in Moriah, New York. He was educated locally, and became a school teacher. He later moved to Portsmouth, Ohio, where he became an attorney. He served in local offices, including Portsmouth City Clerk and Lawrence County prosecuting attorney. In 1848 Jordan was one of the partners who established Portsmouth's Democratic Enquirer newspaper.

A friend of Salmon P. Chase, when Chase became Secretary of the Treasury in 1861 Jordan was named Solicitor of the Treasury, serving until the end of Andrew Johnson's administration in 1869. After leaving the Treasury Department Jordan continued to practice law in New York City.

He died on September 22, 1899, in Elizabeth, New Jersey and was buried at Woodland Cemetery in Ironton, Ohio.

== Family ==
In 1852, Jordan married Augusta Woodbury Ricker.

They were the parents of three daughters, Mary Augusta, a librarian and professor, first at Vassar College, and later at Smith College, Elizabeth, and Emily, the latter of whom married Henry Clay Folger. Edward Jordan was also the grandfather of Edward Jordan Dimock.

Legal offices
Preceded by Benjamin F. Pleasants	Solicitor of the United States Treasury; 1861–1869	Succeeded by E. C. Banfield
