= Bonn University Shakespeare Company =

The Bonn University Shakespeare Company e.V. (BUSC) is an independent theatre company based at the University of Bonn, Germany. It was founded by students of the Department of English, American, and Celtic Studies in 1992.

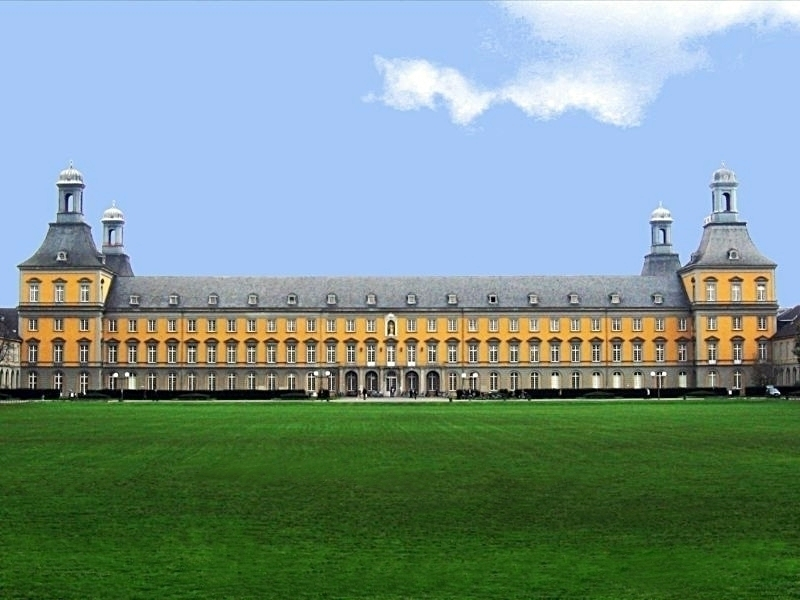
The University of Bonn

== History ==
The BUSC was founded in November 1992 by English Studies students Thilo Veenema and Magnus Huber after the previous theatre company at the English Department had broken up. According to §21 BGB, it is a strictly non-commercial organisation. In 2015, the group had about a hundred active members and nearly two hundred former members. The group's main aim is the promotion of art and culture in Bonn and the area, especially the promotion of the works of Shakespeare, his contemporaries and other English-language authors. The group is particularly interested in cooperating with schools in the area. Furthermore, the BUSC collaborates with Shakespeare scholars like Uwe Baumann (University of Bonn) and Russell Jackson (University of Birmingham), the latter of which has previously worked as an advisor for film adaptations of Shakespeare's work. The company's performance programmes usually contain academic articles on the play performed, written by professors and lecturers at the University of Bonn. Normally, the BUSC performs about two plays per year, one in the summer term and one in the winter term. All plays are performed in the original English version, the only exception being “Vell Jedöhns wääje nüß”, a Rhineland dialect translation of Much Ado About Nothing, in the year 2000. For this production the group was awarded the “Martin-Lehnert-Preis” by the German Shakespeare Society. Most performances take place at the Brotfabrik theatre in Bonn-Beuel, where the plays are performed for six to ten days in a row. The average number of performances per production is seven.

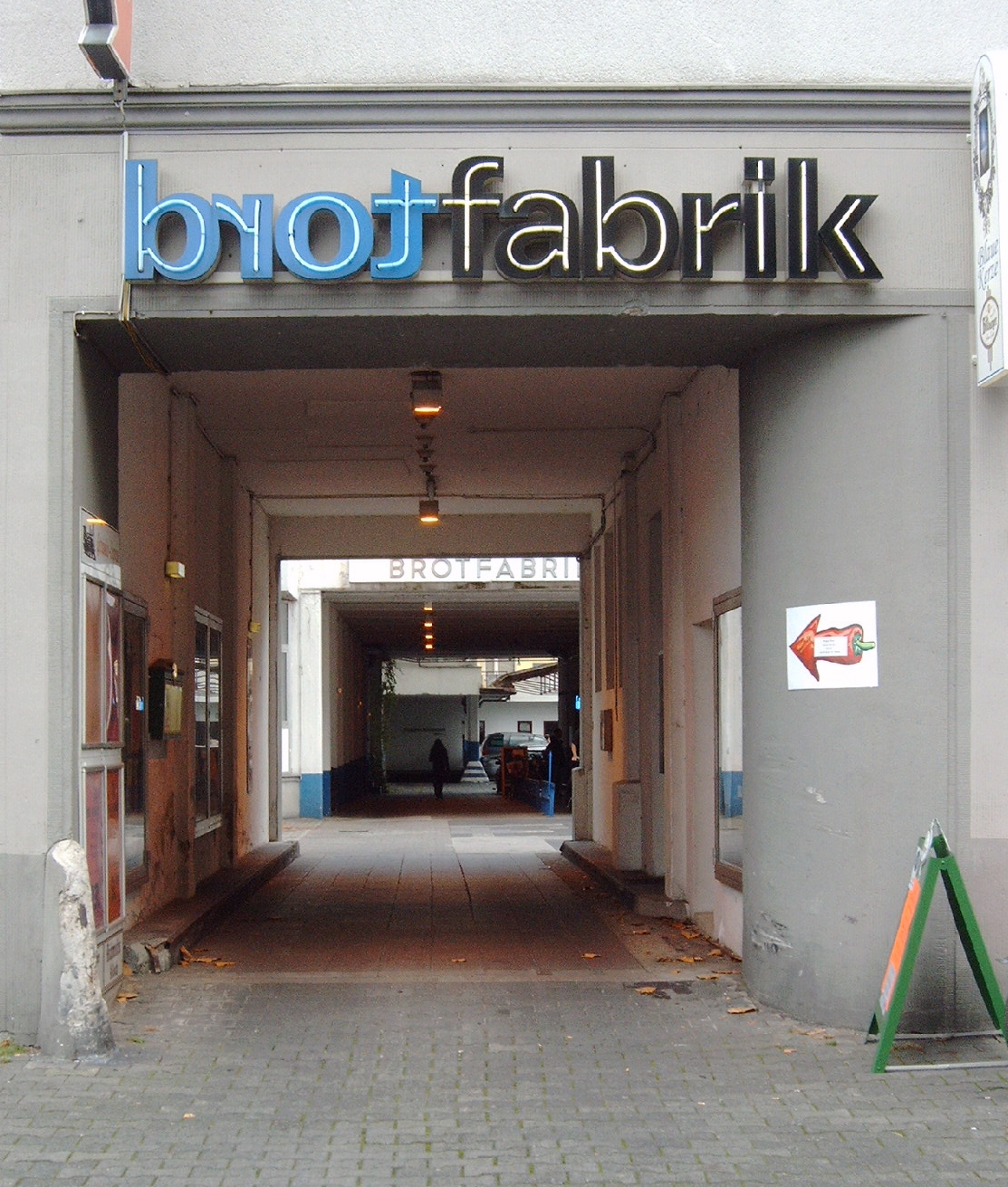
The Brotfabrik theatre in Bonn-Beuel

Apart from Shakespeare's plays, the group also performs tragedies and comedies by Christopher Marlowe, John Ford, Oscar Wilde or T.S. Eliot. In 2002, the group staged their first musical with Little Shop of Horrors. In 2003 and 2004, the BUSC were invited to perform at the reconstructed Globe Theatre in Neuss, Germany, with their productions of Timon of Athens and “Vell Jedöhns wääje nüß/Much Ado About Nothing”. Within Bonn, the group also performed at the Haus der Springmaus theatre, on Bonn's Museumsmeile, and Poppelsdorf Palace. In 2002, the group's ten year anniversary was celebrated with a one-week Shakespeare festival consisting of performances and talks. Every now and then, members of the BUSC have the opportunity to attend workshops with theatre professionals, for example in Shakespeare's home town of Stratford-upon-Avon in 2005.

== Productions ==
- Winter 1993: Richard II (W. Shakespeare)
- Summer 1994: Doctor Faustus (C. Marlowe)
- Autumn 1994: The Taming of the Shrew (W. Shakespeare)
- Summer 1995: Julius Caesar (W. Shakespeare)
- Summer 1995: Macbeth (W. Shakespeare)
- Winter 1995: Pericles, Prince of Tyre (W. Shakespeare)
- Summer 1996: Few but roses (Sonnets, W. Shakespeare)
- Winter 1996: Angels in America (T. Kushner)
- Summer 1997: A Midsummer Night's Dream (W. Shakespeare)
- Winter 1997: The Winter's Tale (W. Shakespeare)
- Summer 1998: The Importance of Being Earnest (O. Wilde)
- Winter 1998: The Merchant of Venice (W. Shakespeare)
- Spring 1999: The Two Gentlemen of Verona (W. Shakespeare)
- Summer 1999: The Merry Wives of Windsor (W. Shakespeare)
- Summer 1999: The Tempest (W. Shakespeare)
- Winter 1999: Titus Andronicus (W. Shakespeare)
- Summer 2000: Twelfth Night (W. Shakespeare)
- Autumn 2000: Vell Jedöhns wääje nüß (original: Much Ado About Nothing, W. Shakespeare)
- Winter 2000: Murder in the Cathedral (T.S. Eliot)
- Summer 2001: Cymbeline (W. Shakespeare)
- Winter 2001: Henry V (W. Shakespeare)
- Summer 2002: Little Shop of Horrors (A. Menken/H. Ashman)
- Summer 2002: Romeo and Juliet (W. Shakespeare)
- Winter 2002: Hamlet (W. Shakespeare)
- Summer 2003: Timon of Athens (W. Shakespeare)
- Winter 2003: The Changeling (T. Middleton/W. Rowley)
- Summer 2004: Our Country's Good (T. Wertenbaker)
- Summer 2004: A Midsummer Night's Dream (W. Shakespeare)
- Winter 2004: The Country Wife (W. Wycherley)
- Summer 2005: Othello (W. Shakespeare)
- Winter 2005: An Ideal Husband (O. Wilde)
- Summer 2006: Macbeth (W. Shakespeare)
- Winter 2006: One Flew Over the Cuckoo's Nest (D. Wasserman/K. Kesey)
- Summer 2007: Les Liaisons Dangereuses (C. Hampton/C. de Laclos)
- Winter 2007: Romeo and Juliet (W. Shakespeare)
- Summer 2008: TroilusWAHN und CressidaTHEATER (W. Shakespeare/W. Schwab)
- Winter 2008: The Roman Actor (P. Massinger)
- Summer 2009: A Clockwork Orange (A. Burgess)
- Winter 2009: Antony and Cleopatra (W. Shakespeare)
- Summer 2010: Man of the Moment (A. Ayckbourn)
- Winter 2010: Richard III (W. Shakespeare)
- Summer 2011: The Taming of the Shrew (W. Shakespeare)
- Winter 2011: Henry VIII (W. Shakespeare)
- Summer 2012: Lady Windermere's Fan (O. Wilde)
- Winter 2012: Measure for Measure (W. Shakespeare)
- Summer 2013: The Crucible (A. Miller)
- Winter 2013: Alice's Adventures in Wonderland (L. Carroll)
- Summer 2014: Twelfth Night (W. Shakespeare)
- Winter 2014: Titus Andronicus (W. Shakespeare)
- Summer 2015: The Count of Monte Cristo (A. Dumas)
- Winter 2015: Macbeth (W. Shakespeare)
- Summer 2016: The Master and Margarita (M. Bulgakov)
- Winter 2016: Julius Caesar (W. Shakespeare)
- Summer 2017: All's Well That Ends Well & A Midsummer Night's Dream (both by W. Shakespeare)
