= Mary Augusta Jordan =

American academic

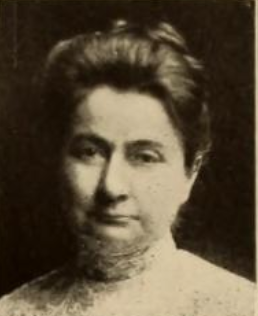
- Mary Augusta Jordan, from the 1916 yearbook of Smith College
- Born: July 5, 1855; Ironton, Ohio
- Died: April 14, 1941 (age 85); New Haven, Connecticut
- Occupation: College professor
- Father: Edward Jordan
- Relatives: Emily Jordan Folger (sister); Henry Clay Folger (brother-in-law); David Starr Jordan (first cousin); Edward Jordan Dimock (nephew)

Mary Augusta Jordan (July 5, 1855 – April 14, 1941) was an American college professor of English literature and rhetoric. She was a member of the faculty at Smith College from 1884 to 1921.

== Early life and education ==
Jordan was born in Ironton, Ohio, the daughter of Edward Jordan and Augusta Woodbury Ricker Jordan. Her father was a lawyer who worked for the United States Department of the Treasury in Washington, D.C. during the Lincoln and Johnson administrations, and she was said to have held Lincoln's hand when she was a little girl. The Jordans moved in Elizabeth, New Jersey, where she attended Miss Ranney's school. She and both of her sisters attended Vassar College; she graduated from Vassar in 1876, and earned a master's degree in 1878.

Jordan was a member of the Daughters of the American Revolution. Her younger sister Emily married Henry Clay Folger; the Folgers founded the Folger Shakespeare Library in Washington, D.C. Federal judge Edward Jordan Dimock was her nephew.

== Career ==
After college, Jordan became a librarian at Vassar, and taught in the English department. She joined the faculty at Smith College in 1884, teaching rhetoric. In 1906 she gained full professor status, and became head of the English department. She was best known for teaching Shakespeare and giving ceremonial addresses. She retired in 1921, but continued her association when the college commissioned her to write a history of English teaching at Smith.

Jordan spoke at Vassar College's 50th anniversary celebration in 1915. An educated white woman from a prominent and wealthy family, she considered women's suffrage "superfluous", and believed that women had sufficient opportunity for shaping society through other, existing means. She often debated suffrage and other issues with a fellow Vassar alumna and Smith professor, Mary Augusta Scott.

Jordan wrote on gender, rhetoric, and pedagogy, and proposed that women's education need not match men's, in form or content, pointing to the "under-inspiration of our over-examined young men" ("The College for Women", 1892). She noted that "It is a capital error in the education of women to ignore the part played by their feelings. It is still worse to try to supersede these feelings by what is called good judgment based on logical processes. The logic of feeling is quite as important as the manipulation of syllogisms, and likely to be a good deal more practical" (Correct Writing and Speaking, 1904). She also declared, "There is no one correct way of writing or of speaking English. Within certain limits there are many ways of attaining correctness" (Correct Writing and Speaking, 1904).

== Honors ==
Jordan held honorary doctorates from Smith College (in 1910) and Syracuse University (in 1921). Jordan House, a dormitory at Smith, was named for her in 1922. The college also offers a Jordan Prize for student writing, and a Jordan named chair in the English department.

== Publications ==
=== Written by Jordan ===
- "Concerning the Higher Education" (1886)
- "The Years in Vassar College" (1899)
- Correct Writing and Speaking (1904)
- "Spacious Days at Vassar" (1915)

=== Edited by Jordan ===
- Milton's Minor Poems (1904)
- Emerson, Compensation, self-reliance, and other essays (1907)
- Emerson, Manners, Friendship, and other essays (1907)

== Personal life ==
Jordan was briefly engaged to her first cousin, Stanford University president David Starr Jordan. She lived in campus housing for much of her time at Smith, and opened her personal library for student use. She died in 1941, at the age of 85, in New Haven, Connecticut. Smith College has a collection of Jordan's papers.
