= Michael Witmore =

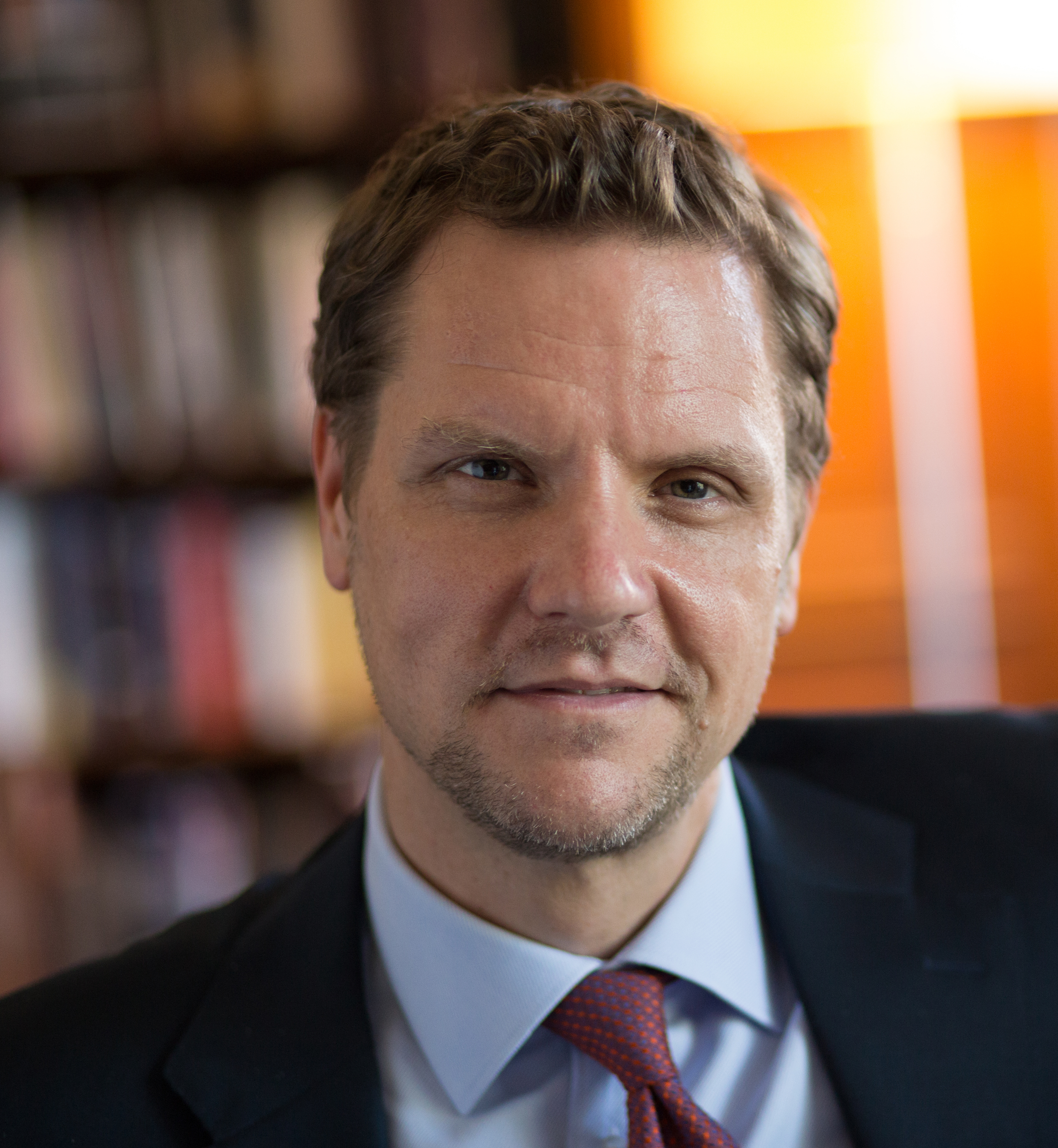
- Michael Witmore
- Born: May 3, 1967 (age 59)
- Education: Vassar College; University of California, Berkeley
- Occupations: Nonprofit leader, Shakespeare scholar, digital preservationist

Michael Witmore (born May 3, 1967) is a scholar of Shakespeare and rhetoric, a digital humanist, and former director of a library and cultural institution. He served as the director of the Folger Shakespeare Library in Washington, D.C., from 2011 to June 2024, during which the Folger Shakespeare Library conceived and completed an $81.5 million, four-year renovation project. He currently consults on digital preservation and cultural accessibility.

== Early life and career ==
Michael Witmore graduated from Vassar College in 1989 with a bachelor's degree in English. He has an M.A. and a Ph.D. in rhetoric from the University of California, Berkeley. From 1999 to 2008, he was an assistant professor and then an associate professor of English at Carnegie Mellon University. From 2008 to 2011, he was a professor of English at the University of Wisconsin–Madison.

Witmore's books include Culture of Accidents: Unexpected Knowledges in Early Modern England (2001), the co-winner of the 2003 Perkins Prize for the study of narrative literature; Pretty Creatures: Children and Fiction in the English Renaissance (2007); Shakespearean Metaphysics (2008); and Landscapes of the Passing Strange: Reflections from Shakespeare (2010) with photographer Rosamond Purcell. He co-edited Childhood and Children's Books in Early Modern Europe, 1550–1800 (2006) and Shakespeare and Early Modern Religion (2015).

== Digital humanities ==
A pioneer in the use of computers for digital analysis of the texts of William Shakespeare, Witmore launched and directed the Working Group for Digital Inquiry at the University of Wisconsin-Madison and organized the Pittsburgh Consortium for Medieval and Renaissance Studies. He also founded Wine Dark Sea, a blog on the nature of linguistic variation in Shakespeare's plays and early modern English text.

Witmore is interested in how the resources of computing, when applied to collections of digitized texts, can allow scholars to do intellectual and cultural history "at the level of the sentence." He is known for proposing that "massive addressability" is a fundamental feature of texts.

Witmore is currently working on a project with Vint Cerf (Google) called "Digital Vellum," which aims to preserve and transmit cultural materials in digital form centuries into the future.

== Folger Shakespeare Library ==
As the director of the Folger Shakespeare Library, Witmore developed a new strategic plan, which was accepted by the board in 2013. From 2020 to June 2024, the Folger building temporarily closed for a major renovation project, adding two new exhibition halls, extensive new gardens that incorporate two large entry ramps, and accessible visitor entrances below the existing building, in addition to other changes. The renovation project incorporated commissioned art, including a poem by Rita Dove engraved beside a garden path, a light and paper sculpture by Anke Neumann, and an installation by Fred Wilson (artist).

During Witmore's tenure, the Folger pursued multiple digital humanities (DH) projects, including Early Modern Manuscripts Online (EMMO), Shakespeare's World (a crowdsourced manuscripts project), Shakespeare Documented, A Digital Anthology of Early Modern English Drama (EMED), and apps with a social reading platform for seven of Shakespeare's most-known plays. In addition, the Folger editions of Shakespeare's plays and poems were made available in free, searchable form — originally as the Folger Digital Texts, launched in 2012, and then, in 2020, as The Folger Shakespeare.

Witmore led the Folger in celebrating three major Shakespeare anniversaries: the 450th anniversary of Shakespeare's birth in 2014, the 400th anniversary of Shakespeare's death in 2016, and the 400th anniversary of the First Folio of Shakespeare in 2023. In preparation for the first two anniversaries, the library updated and renovated its Great Hall exhibition space and completed a number of upgrades to its Elizabethan Theatre. The Folger marked the 2014 anniversary of Shakespeare's birth with Shakespeare's the Thing, an exhibition of Shakespeare-related items curated by Folger staff members. For the 2016 anniversary of his death, the Folger organized a traveling national tour, First Folio! The Book That Gave Us Shakespeare, which displayed First Folios from the Folger collection in all 50 states, Washington, D.C., and Puerto Rico, with public programs and events at the host sites. Other aspects of the 2016 anniversary celebration included a C-SPAN2 Book TV live broadcast on the anniversary date, a Los Angeles exhibition on America's Shakespeare: The Bard Goes West, launching a continuing Theater Partnership Program nationwide, commissioning the vocal work "The Isle" (based on The Tempest) by Caroline Shaw, premiering District Merchants, a variation of The Merchant of Venice set in Washington, D.C., after the Civil War, and piloting the CrossTalk DC community discussion program on race and religion as part of the NEH’s Humanities in the Public Square program. In 2023, the Folger produced Searching for Shakespeare, a festival of events for the anniversary of Shakespeare's First Folio, in partnership with the District of Columbia Public Library system, including the premiere of the play Our Verse in Time to Come by Malik Work and Karen Ann Daniels, in collaboration with Devin E. Haqq, the Shakespeare's Birthday Lecture, a citywide scavenger hunt, workshops and family activities, and the exhibition of a Folger First Folio at the Martin Luther King Jr. Memorial Library.

Under Witmore, the Folger also produced many other projects, among them Manifold Greatness: The Creation and Afterlife of the King James Bible, an NEH-funded 2011–13 national touring panel exhibition on the 400th anniversary of the 1611 King James Bible, with the Bodleian Library of the University of Oxford; the Shakespeare Unlimited podcast series, for which Witmore recorded introductions to more than 200 episodes; the general-audience Shakespeare & Beyond blog; the Folger Shakespeare Audio Editions, studio recordings of seven Shakespeare plays by the Folger Theatre; and what is believed to be the first professional performance in centuries of William Davenant's adaptation of Macbeth from about 1664. Other Folger projects included Experiencing Shakespeare, an electronic field trip used by hundreds of thousands of students and produced by Folger Education, which won two regional Emmys; curricula on Romeo and Juliet, Hamlet, and Othello for grades 9, 10, and 12 in the District of Columbia Public Schools (DCPS); and Black Shakespeare, an award-winning curriculum for Reconstruction, an online education platform. The Folger also organized "Before 'Farm to Table,'" a four-year collaborative research project funded by the Mellon Foundation that included scholars in multiple disciplines, performers, chefs, and others, on early modern food and foodways and their social and international impact, including a commissioned theatrical work, Confection. Witmore also sought out new ways to combine science and the humanities, including DNA research on the dust in centuries-old books.

While serving as Folger director, Witmore was the co-curator with photographer and co-author Rosamond Purcell of the 2012 Folger exhibition Very Like a Whale, based on their book Landscapes of the Passing Strange, and the co-curator with Heather Wolfe, the Folger curator of manuscripts and associate librarian, of the 2019 Folger exhibition, A Monument to Shakespeare: The Architecture of the Folger Shakespeare Library. He gave the Folger's annual Shakespeare's Birthday Lecture in 2017, spoke at multiple Folger Institute symposia, served as a faculty member at several Folger Institute seminars, and gave pre-show talks before Folger Theatre performances of Shakespeare plays and plays inspired by Shakespeare. Among other public appearances, he gave a Lowell Lecture on "Civic Shakespeare" in 2019 hosted by Boston College and appeared in numerous interviews and panel discussions.
