= Archiv für das Studium der neueren Sprachen und Literaturen =

- Discipline: Linguistics, literature
- Language: English, German, Romance languages
- Edited by: Christa Jansohn

Publication details
- Former name(s): Herrigs Archiv
- History: 1846–present
- Publisher: Erich Schmidt Verlag (Germany)
- Frequency: Biannually

Standard abbreviations
- ISO 4: Arch. Stud. Neuer. Sprachen Lit.

Indexing
- ISSN: 0003-8970
- LCCN: 10032834
- OCLC no.: 457008267

Links
- Journal homepage

Archiv für das Studium der neueren Sprachen und Literaturen is the oldest modern philological journal, founded in 1846 by Ludwig Herrig and Heinrich Viehoff. The first two volumes were published by Julius Bädeker Verlag Elberfeld and Iserlohn and for the next 120 years by Georg Westermann Verlag Braunschweig (now Westermann Druck- und Verlagsgruppe). Since 1979, the journal is published by Erich Schmidt Verlag, Berlin. The articles, smaller contributions and reviews are written in German, English, and Romance languages. The current editor-in-chief is Christa Jansohn (University of Bamberg).
