= Gail Kern Paster =

American historian

Gail Kern Paster (born 1944) is an American Shakespeare scholar, historian and writer.

== Life ==
She was born on November 8, 1944. Paster graduated from North Shore High School in 1962. She received her bachelor's degree from Smith College and her PhD from Yale University.

== Career ==
Paster taught at the George Washington University from 1974 to 2002. From 2002 to 2011, she was the director of the Folger Shakespeare Library.

She has also served as editor of the Shakespeare Quarterly magazine and as interim president and librarian of the Newberry Library from April to October 2023.

== Bibliography ==
Paster's notable books include:

- Humoring the Body: Emotions and the Shakespearean Stage (2004)
- Reading the Early Modern Passions: Essays in the Cultural History of Emotion
- A Midsummer Night's Dream: Texts and Contexts
- The Idea of the City in the Age of Shakespeare (1986)
- Michaelmas Term: Thomas Middleton
- The Body Embarrassed: Drama and the Disciplines of Shame in Early Modern England (1993).
