= Benjamin F. Pleasants =

American lawyer

Benjamin F. Pleasants (November 10, 1795 – June 2, 1879) was an American government official who served as acting Solicitor of the United States Treasury. He was also the son in law of John Adair.

== Biography ==
Benjamin Franklin Pleasants was born in Richmond, Virginia, on November 10, 1795. In 1803 his family relocated to Versailles, Kentucky, where he was raised and educated.

In February, 1817 Pleasants married Isabella McCalla Adair. He lived in Harrodsburg, Kentucky, studied law and was admitted to the bar, and also served as Cashier of the Bank of the Commonwealth in Harrodsburg.

In 1830 Pleasants was appointed to a Clerk's position in the United States Treasury Department. During his government career he became Chief Clerk in the Office of the Solicitor of the Treasury, and he occasionally served as acting Solicitor of the Treasury.

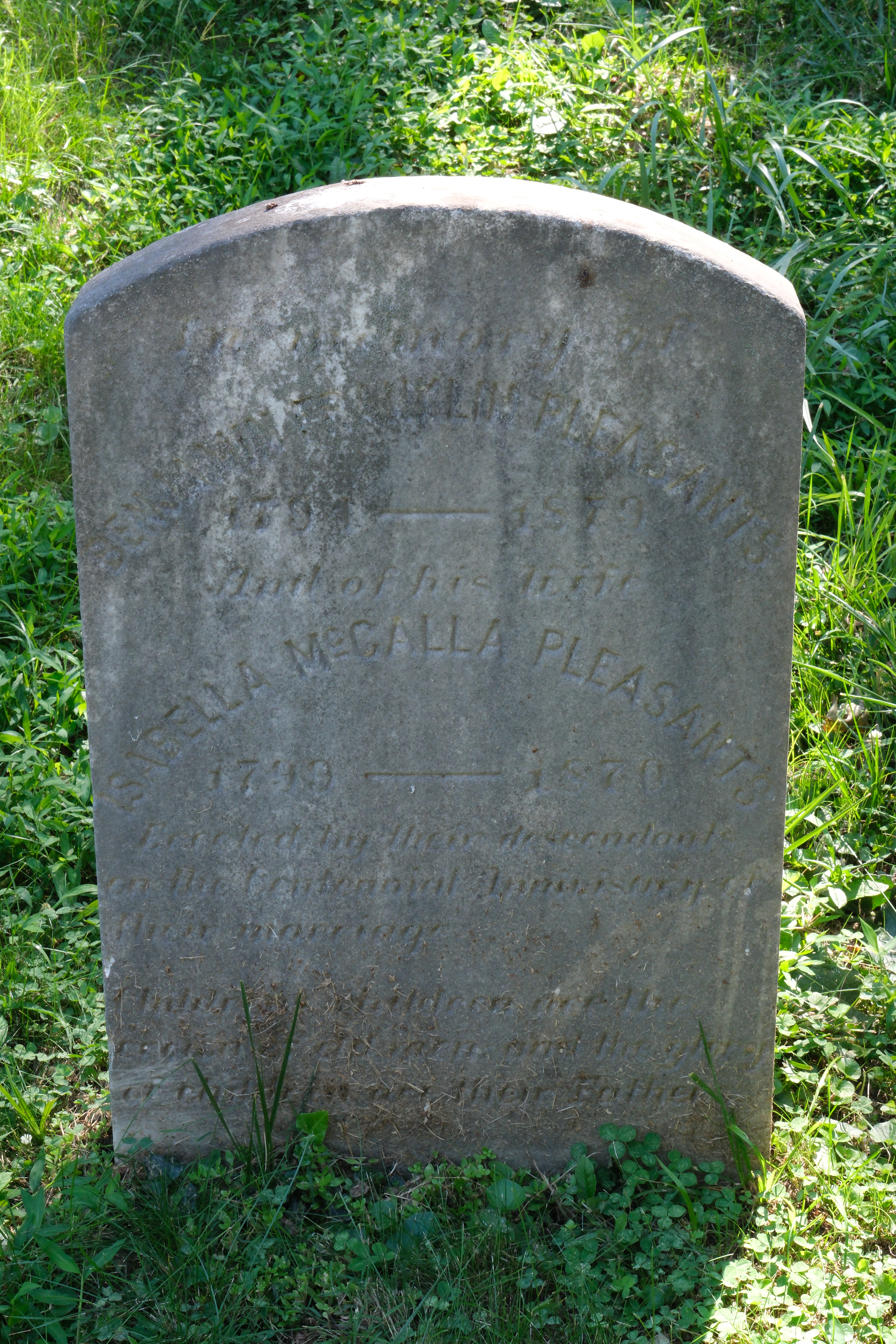
Grave of Pleasants at Oak Hill Cemetery

Pleasants continued to work at the Treasury Department almost until his death. He died in Washington, D.C., on June 2, 1879. He was buried in Washington's Oak Hill Cemetery.

Legal offices
| Preceded by Junius Hillyer | Solicitor of the United States Treasury; 1861–1861 | Succeeded by Edward Jordan |
