= Werner Habicht =

German scholar of Shakespeare

Werner Habicht (29 January 1930 – 5 November 2022) was a German scholar of English literature and culture and an internationally acclaimed authority in the field of Shakespeare studies in particular. During his academic career, he held Chairs in English Studies at the Universities of Heidelberg (1966–70), Bonn (1970–78), and Würzburg (1978–95). Between 1976 and 1987 he was President of the West German branch of the German Shakespeare Society (Deutsche Shakespeare-Gesellschaft).

== Education ==
Born in 1930 in Schweinfurt, Habicht studied English and Romance Studies at LMU Munich, Johns Hopkins University in Baltimore, MD, and the universities of Paris and Bristol. After completion of the teacher-training ‘Staatsexamen’ in 1954, he was awarded his doctorate at the LMU in 1957, and – following a period as a Research Associate at both the LMU and the Free University of Berlin – achieved Habilitation in Munich in 1965.

== Career ==
Habicht's professorial career at Heidelberg, Bonn, and Würzburg was interspersed with guest professorships at the University of Texas at Austin, the University of Colorado Boulder, the Ohio State University in Columbus and the University of Cyprus in Nicosia. Alongside his Presidency of the German Shakespeare Society between 1976 and 1987, he was a full member of the Bavarian Academy of Sciences and Humanities (Bayerische Akademie der Wissenschaften), as well as being a corresponding (elected) member of the Academy of Sciences and Literature (Akademie der Wissenschaften und der Literatur) in Mainz, an honorary vice-president of the International Shakespeare Association and an honorary member of the Australian and New Zealand Shakespeare Association (ANZSA). In 1986 he organized the Third Congress of the International Shakespeare Association in West Berlin.

Habicht was recognized as one of his generation's leading lights in German Shakespeare Studies, as well as being a literary scholar of international renown. His research and publication profile spanned a broad epochal range, covering medieval English literature and philology (both Old and Middle English), and the literatures and cultures of the English Renaissance and the 19th and 20th Centuries. He also published prolifically on the history of translation, on literary lexicography, and on the history of the theatre, making ground-breaking contributions above all to the study of Shakespeare and his reception in Germany. In 1996 he participated in a conference on "Shakespeare in the Worlds of Communism 1920-1990" hosted by the Folger Shakespeare Library and the Russian Embassy in Washington, D.C., which brought together an international team of scholars and resulted in a book, to which Habicht contributed an essay on “Shakespeare and the Berlin Wall”. Alongside around 120 articles and chapters, Habicht authored seminal book-length studies on – among other subjects – the use of gesture in Medieval English poetry (1959), English dramatic form before Shakespeare (1968), Shakespeare's place in the German literary and cultural imagination (1994), and English literature and its contexts at the close of the 16th century (1995). On the occasion of Shakespeare's 450th birthday in 2014, he collaborated with fellow members of the Mainz Academy on the Shakespeare Album: a photographic album presenting 109 portraits and autograph signatures of personalities central to the propagation of German interest in Shakespeare over the centuries.

Among his philological contributions, he edited a large collection of letters of F. A. Leo (1820–1898) at the Folger Shakespeare Library, many of which related to the early history of the German Shakespeare Society, as well as a selection of German-language documents relating primarily to Shakespeare at the Folger Library. He was also the founding editor of English and American Studies in Germany (1969–82), editor of the Shakespeare Jahrbuch (West) between 1980 and 1995, and co-editor of a bilingual edition of Shakespeare's plays, several volumes of essays, and a major literary encyclopaedia, Der Literatur Brockhaus (8 vols., 2nd ed. 1995).

== Major publications ==
- Die Gebärde in englischen Dichtungen des Mittelalters, Bayerischer Akademie der Wissenschaften (Munich: C. H. Beck, 1959). Studien zur Dramenform vor Shakespeare (Heidelberg: Winter, 1968).
- Ed., English and American Studies in German (EASG): Summaries of Theses and Monographs. A Supplement to Anglia (Tübingen: Niemeyer, 1968–1983) [annual].
- Ed. with Ernst Leisi, Rudolph Stamm et al., English-deutsche Studienausgabe der Dramen Shakespeares (Tübingen, Stauffenburg, 1976–1997).
- Ed. with Ina Schabert, Sympathielenkung in den Dramen Shakespeares: Studien zur publikumsbezogenen Dramaturgie (Munich: Wilhelm Fink, 1978).
- Ed., Shakespeare Jahrbuch (West) (Bochum: Ferdinand Kamp, 1981–1992) [annual].
- Ed. with D. J. Palmer and Roger Pringle, Images of Shakespeare: Proceedings of the Third Congress of the International Shakespeare Association, 1986 (Newark: University of Delaware Press, 1988).
- Ed., “Leo, Friedrich August. Letters mostly to him from various people”, M.S. (Washington, D.C.: The Folger Shakespeare Library, 1992). See here.
- Ed. with G. Klotz, Shakespeare Jahrbuch (West) (Bochum: Ferdinand Kamp, 1981–1992) [annual].
- Shakespeare and the German Imagination, International Shakespeare Association Occasional Paper No. 5 (Hertford: Stephen Austin & Sons, 1994).
- Texte und Kontexte der englischen Literatur im Jahr 1595, Bayerischer Akademie der Wissenschaften (Munich: C. H. Beck, 1995).
- Ed. with Dieter Lange, Der Literatur Brockhaus, 8 vols (Berlin: Cornelsen, 2nd rev. pbk. ed. 1995).
- “Shakespeare and the Berlin Wall”, in: Shakespeare in the Worlds of Communism and Socialism, ed. Irena R. Makaryk and Joseph G. Price (Toronto: University of Toronto Press, 2006), pp. 157–176.
- Ed. with Christa Jansohn, Shakespeare Album, in cooperation with the Mainzer Akademie der Wissenschaften und der Literatur, Theatersammlung der Universität Köln, and the Shakespeare Library, University of Birmingham (Mainz: Akademie der Wissenschaften und der Literatur, 2014). See here.
- Ed. with Christa Jansohn, Dieter Mehl, and Philip Redl, Shakespeare unter den Deutschen (Stuttgart: Franz Steiner, 2015).
