= Folger Shakespeare Library =

Independent research library in Washington, D.C.

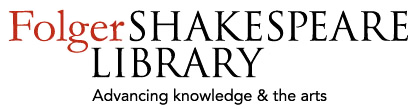

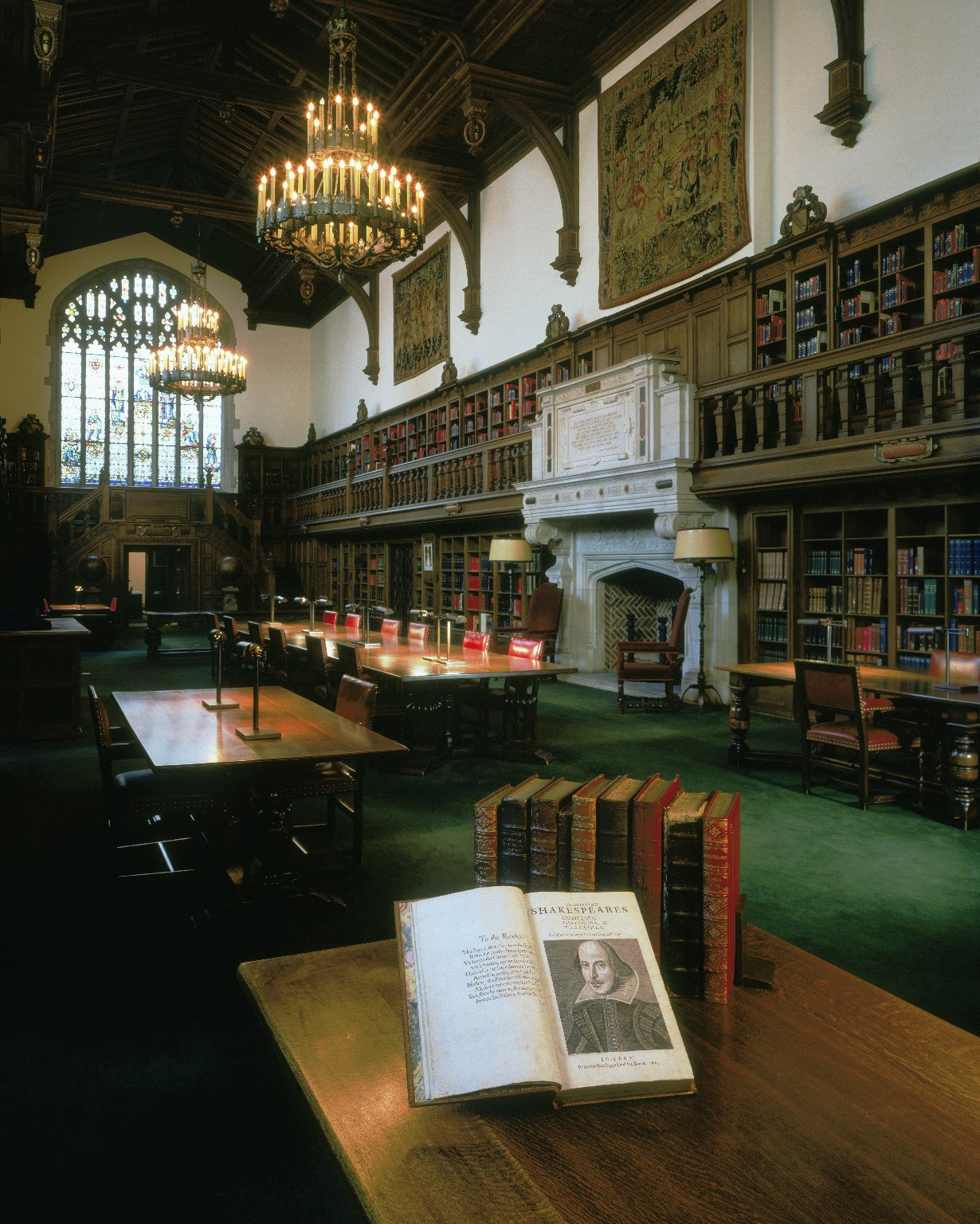
- The Folger Shakespeare Library reading room with one of Shakespeare's First Folios in the foreground
- 38°53′22″N 77°0′11″W
- Location: Washington, D.C., United States
- Type: Private Research library Special library
- Scope: Early modern Europe, Shakespeare
- Established: 1932
- Architects: Cret, Paul P.; Trowbridge, Alexander B. (Modern architecture)

Collection
- Items collected: Shakespeare-related materials, rare books, manuscripts, prints, drawings, playbills, paintings

Other information
- Director: Dr. Farah Karim-Cooper
- Website: www.folger.edu

The Folger Shakespeare Library is an independent research library on Capitol Hill in Washington, D.C., United States. It has the world's largest collection of the printed works of William Shakespeare, and is a primary repository for rare materials from the early modern period (1500–1750) in Britain and Europe. The library was established by Henry Clay Folger in association with his wife, Emily Jordan Folger. It opened in 1932, two years after his death.

The library offers advanced scholarly programs and national outreach to K–12 classroom teachers on Shakespeare education. Other performances and events at the Folger include the award-winning Folger Theatre, which produces Shakespeare-inspired theater; Folger Consort, the early-music ensemble-in-residence; the O.B. Hardison Poetry Series; the PEN/Faulkner Foundation Reading Series; and numerous other exhibits, seminars, talks and lectures, and family programs. It also has several publications, including the Folger Library editions of Shakespeare's plays, the journal Shakespeare Quarterly, the teacher resource books Shakespeare Set Free, and catalogs of exhibitions. The Folger is also a leader in methods of preserving rare materials.

The library is privately endowed and administered by the Trustees of Amherst College. The library building is listed on the National Register of Historic Places.

== History ==
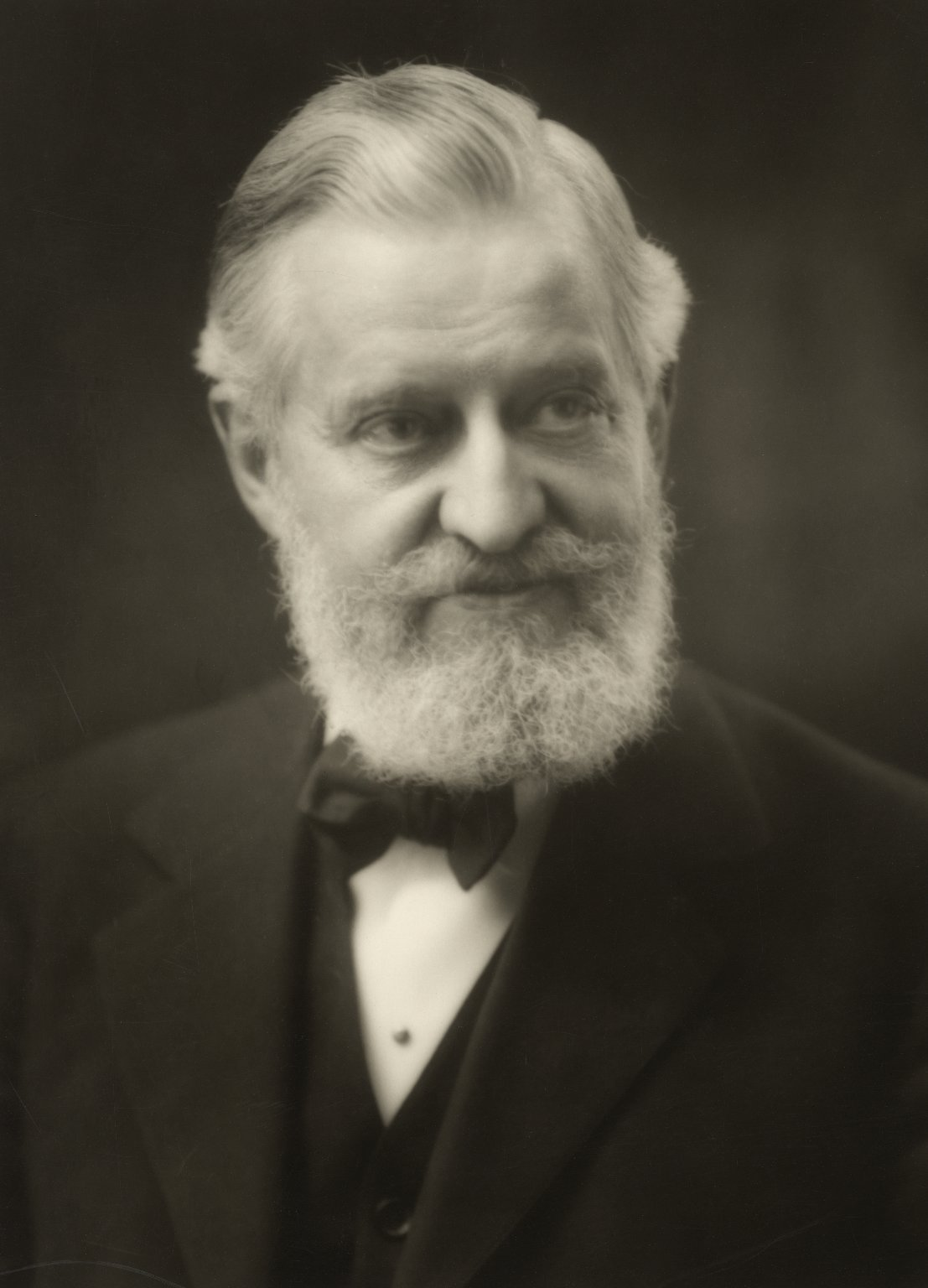
Henry Clay Folger

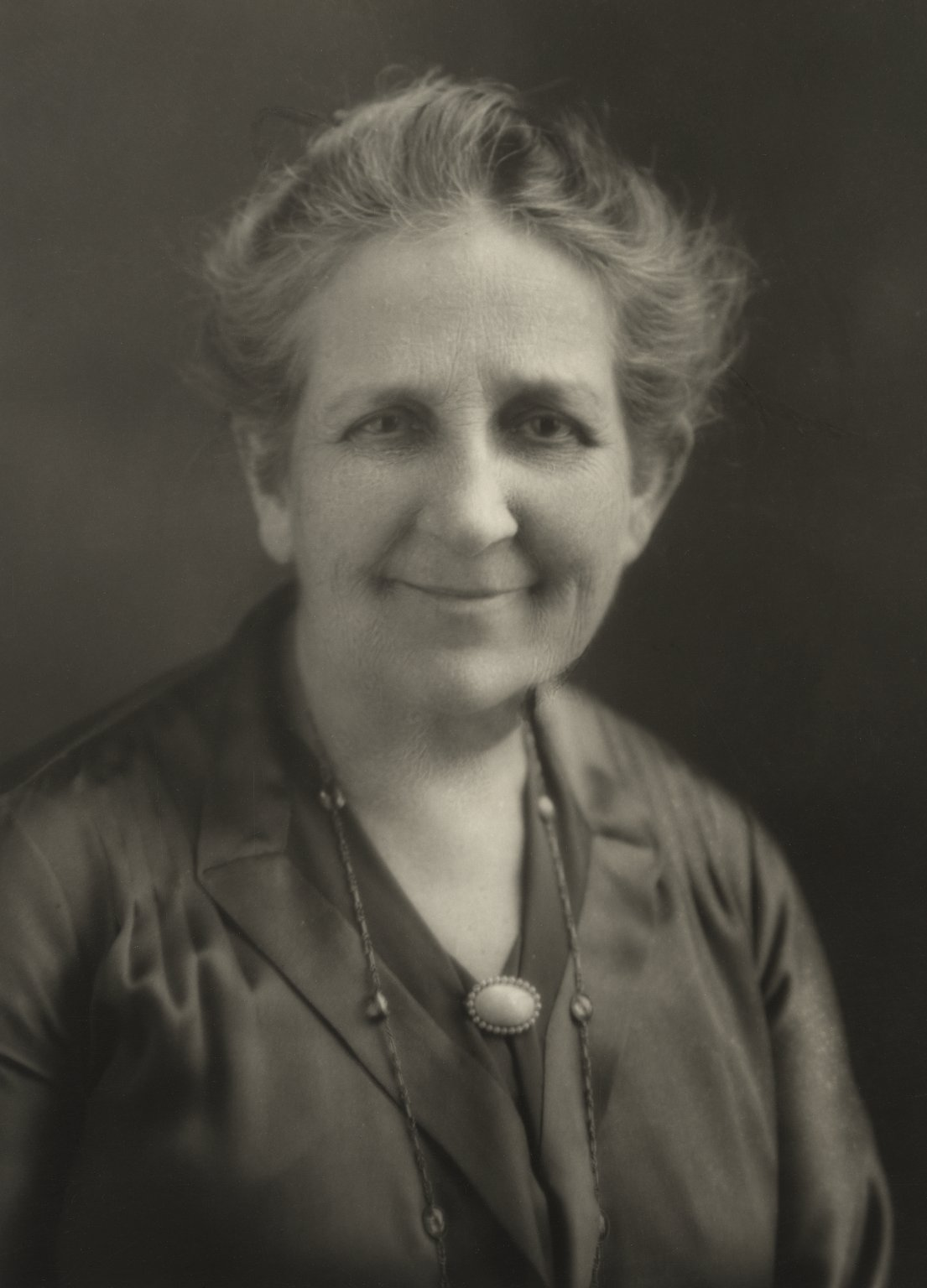
Emily Jordan Folger

Standard Oil of New York executive Henry Clay Folger, a graduate of Amherst College and Columbia University, was an avid collector of Shakespeareana, beginning in 1889 with the purchase of a 1685 Fourth Folio. Toward the end of World War I, he and his wife Emily Jordan Folger began searching for a location for a Shakespeare library based on their collection. They chose a location adjacent to the Library of Congress in Washington, D.C. The land was then occupied by townhouses, and Folger spent several years buying the separate lots. The site was designated for expansion by the Library of Congress, but in 1928, Congress passed a resolution allowing its use for Folger's project.

The cornerstone of the library was laid in May 1930, but Folger died soon afterward. The bulk of Folger's fortune was left in trust, with Amherst College as administrator, for the library. Early members of the board included Amherst graduate and former president Calvin Coolidge, second chairman of the board of trustees. Because of the stock market crash of 1929, Folger's estate was smaller than he had planned, although still substantial. Emily Folger, who had worked with her husband on his collection, supplied the funds to complete the project. The library opened on April 23, 1932, the anniversary of what is believed to be Shakespeare's date of birth. Emily Folger remained involved in its administration until shortly before her death in 1936. In 2005, the Folger Board of Governors undertook administration of the Folger under the auspices of the Amherst Board of Trustees, though the Amherst board continues to manage the Folger's budget.

The Folger's first official reader was B. Roland Lewis, who later published The Shakespeare Documents: Facsimiles, Transliterations, Translations, and Commentary based on his research. The first fellowships were distributed in 1936. Early Folger exhibitions featured enticing items in the collection, including Ralph Waldo Emerson's copy of Shakespeare's works, an Elizabethan lute, and Edwin Booth's Richard III costume. Current practices for Folger exhibitions did not begin until 1964, when the first exhibition curated on site opened. During the Second World War, 30,000 items from the Folger collection were transported under guard to Amherst College's Converse Library, where they were stored for the duration of the war in case of an enemy attack on Washington, D.C.

Many of the Folger's current public events and programs began in the 1970s under the leadership of director O.B. Hardison. Under his direction, the Folger's theater was brought up to Washington, D.C. fire code, permitting performances by the Folger Theatre Group, the library's first professional company. The Folger Poetry Series also began in 1970. Hardison formed the Folger Institute, which coordinates academic programs and research at the Library. Folger Consort, the Library's early music ensemble, began performances in 1977.

The first Director of the Library, from 1940 to 1946, was Joseph Quincy Adams Jr.

== Buildings and grounds ==
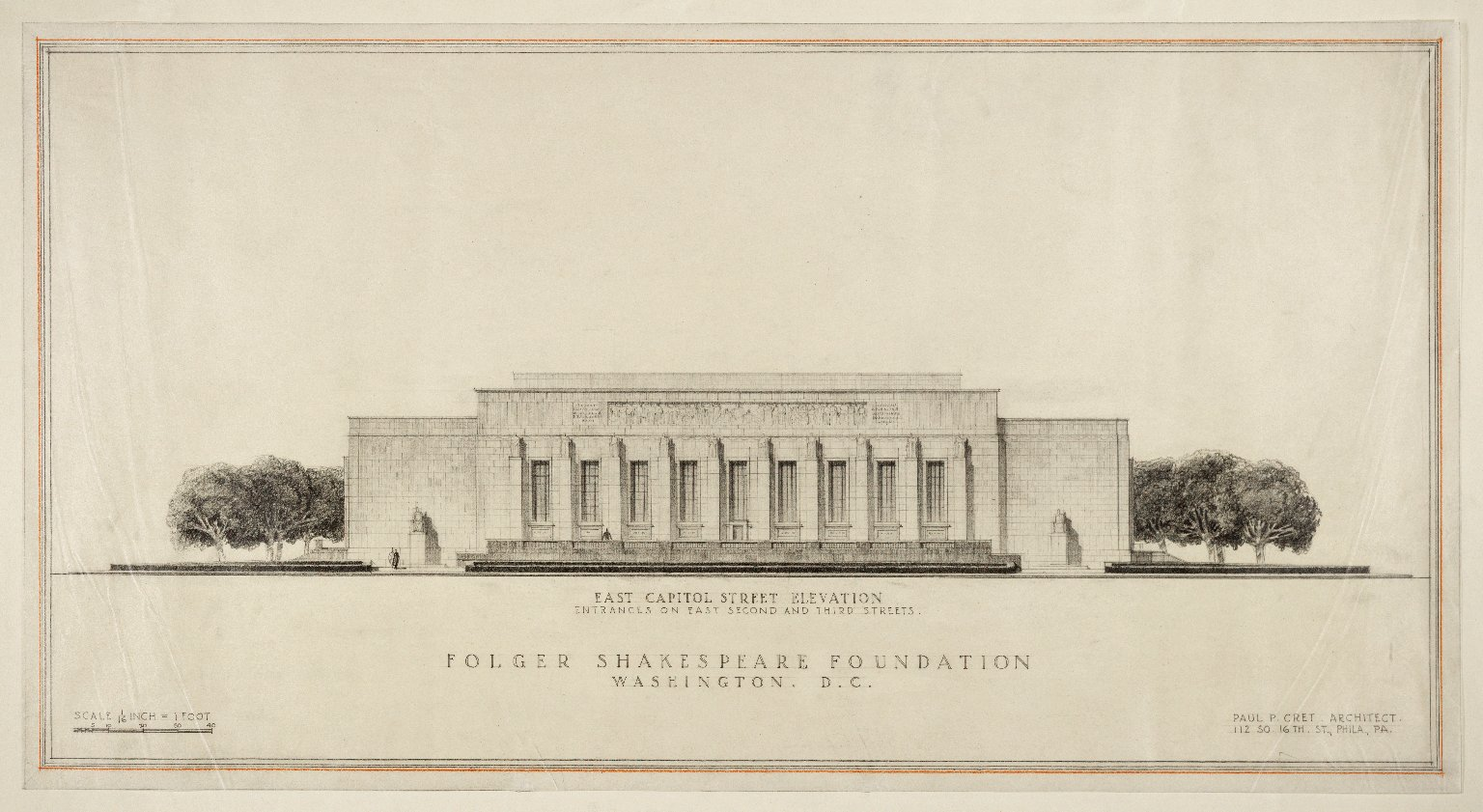
Paul Philippe Cret's original designs for the east facade of the Folger Shakespeare Library, early 1930s

The main Folger building was designed by architect Paul Philippe Cret. The white marble exterior includes nine carved reliefs of scenes from Shakespeare's plays created by the sculptor John Gregory, an aluminum cast of a statue of Puck by Brenda Putnam, as well as many inscriptions personally selected by Henry Folger. The large Art Deco window and door grilles are aluminum.

Inside, the building is designed in a Tudor style with oak paneling and plaster ceilings. The Elizabethan Theatre lobby contains the original marble Puck statue (restored and moved indoors in 2001), and architectural painting by muralist Austin M. Purves Jr. The two reading rooms (one added in the early 1980s) are reserved for use by scholars who have obtained advance permission. Public spaces include the large exhibition gallery, a gift shop, and an Elizabethan theatre.

=== Architecture ===
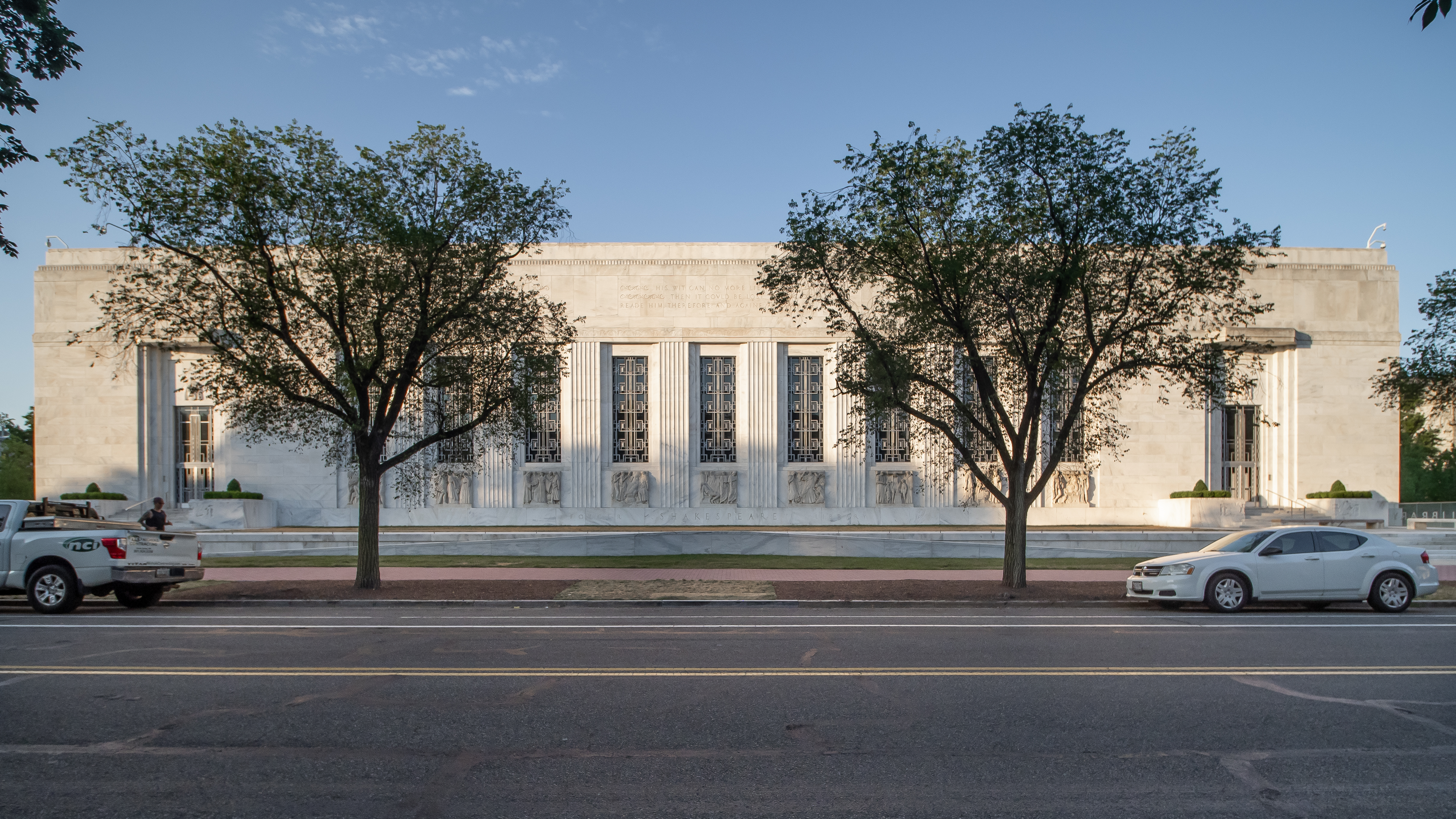
Exterior of Folger Shakespeare Library (2024)

Henry Folger's search for an architect began with an acquaintance, Alexander B. Trowbridge, who had redesigned a home in Glen Cove, Long Island, in the old English style the Folgers were eager to feature in their Library. Folger contracted Trowbridge in 1928, but Trowbridge preferred to consult, rather than be the primary architect, and so recommended French émigré Paul Phillippe Cret. Trowbridge and Cret shared a similar vision for the design of the Library—a neoclassical building that stripped the facade of any decorative elements. Though the Folgers had initially desired an entirely Elizabethan building, they ultimately agreed that a neoclassical building would blend with other existing buildings on Capitol Hill. To retain an Elizabethan quality on the exterior of the building, Cret and Trowbridge proposed to decorate the facade with scenes from Shakespeare's works. Moving from left to right, the front facade's nine relief sculptures depict iconic scenes from A Midsummer Night's Dream, Romeo and Juliet, The Merchant of Venice, Macbeth, Julius Caesar, King Lear, Richard III, Hamlet, and Henry IV, Part 1.

In 1959, the Folger contracted Harbeson, Hough, Livingston, and Larson, a Philadelphia firm that succeeded Cret's, to design a new wing by building over a rear parking lot. The additions also yielded a roof garden on top of the new wing. A second Folger building, the Haskell Center, opened in 2000 across Third Street from the original building. The nineteenth-century office building was adapted by architect Andrew K. Stevenson to house the library's education and public programs staffs.

The Folger currently maintains a row of townhouses on Third Street to provide housing for scholars, readers, fellows, participants in Folger Institute programs, and other visitors.

==== Reading Room ====
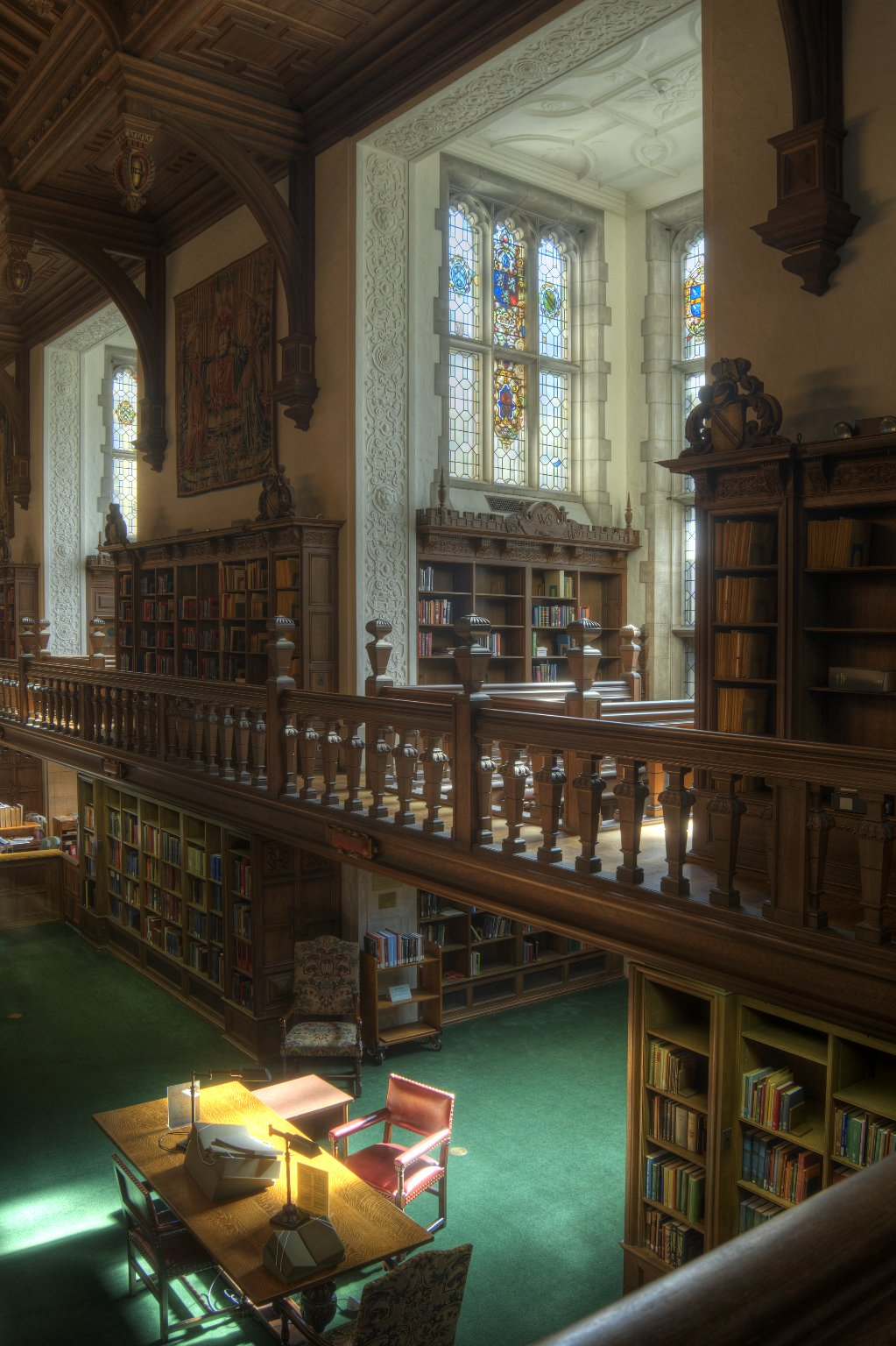
Gail Kern Paster Reading Room

The Reading Room officially opened in January 1933 and today contains reference works for easy accessibility to readers. From 1977 to 1983, the Folger Shakespeare Library was renovated. Design was provided by Hartman-Cox Architects. During this renovation, it included the addition of new book stacks, renovation of office spaces, and an expansion to the Reading Room. A second, more modern reading room dedicated as the Theodora Sedgwick Bond-William Ross Bond Memorial Reading Room was completed in 1982. Upon Gail Kern Paster's retirement as director of the Folger in 2011, the original reading room was renamed the Gail Kern Paster Reading Room.

Henry Folger wanted the Library's reading room to feel at once like a private home and the Great Hall of an English college. It features stained-glass windows and a large stone fireplace which has never been used. The large stained-glass window overlooking what is now the Gail Kern Paster Reading Room was designed and created by Nicola D'Ascenzo, who depicted the familiar "Seven Ages of Man" soliloquy from As You Like It.

==== Elizabethan Theatre ====
Initially, the Elizabethan Theatre was not intended for theatrical performance. The original model was the Fortune Playhouse, and then the Globe Theatre; these models proved difficult to replicate exactly, and the Folgers ultimately decided to incorporate features from multiple theaters to give visitors a general picture of a theater during the Elizabethan era. Before Folger Theatre productions began, the Elizabethan Theatre was used for concert performances and academic lectures. The theater, which seats around 260, has no pit. Painted on the ceiling is a well-known quote from As You Like It: "All the world's a stage, and all the men and women merely players."

The first theatrical performance in the Elizabethan Theatre was a 1949 production of Julius Caesar by the Amherst Masquers. The Folger Theatre Group formed in 1970 when the Elizabethan Theatre became compliant with Washington, D.C. fire safety laws. Early productions included Dionysus Wants You!, which adapted The Bacchae into a rock musical, and Twelfth Night.

==== Elizabethan Garden ====
At the east end of the building is an Elizabethan Garden featuring plants from Shakespeare's plays, opened in 1989 amid the four magnolias planted by Emily Jordan Folger in 1932. In 2003, several sculptures by Greg Wyatt based on Shakespeare's plays joined the Elizabethan plants in the garden.

==== West garden ====
Sculptor Brenda Putnam was hired in May 1930 to design a sculpture of Puck for a garden on the west side of the building. Decades of exposure weakened the statue, and after Puck's right hand was found across the street at the Library of Congress in 2000, the original piece was moved. It now sits near the gift shop on the west side of the building.

The west garden's lawn shrank during the 1959 additions to the library, when part of its space was paved for a new staff parking area.

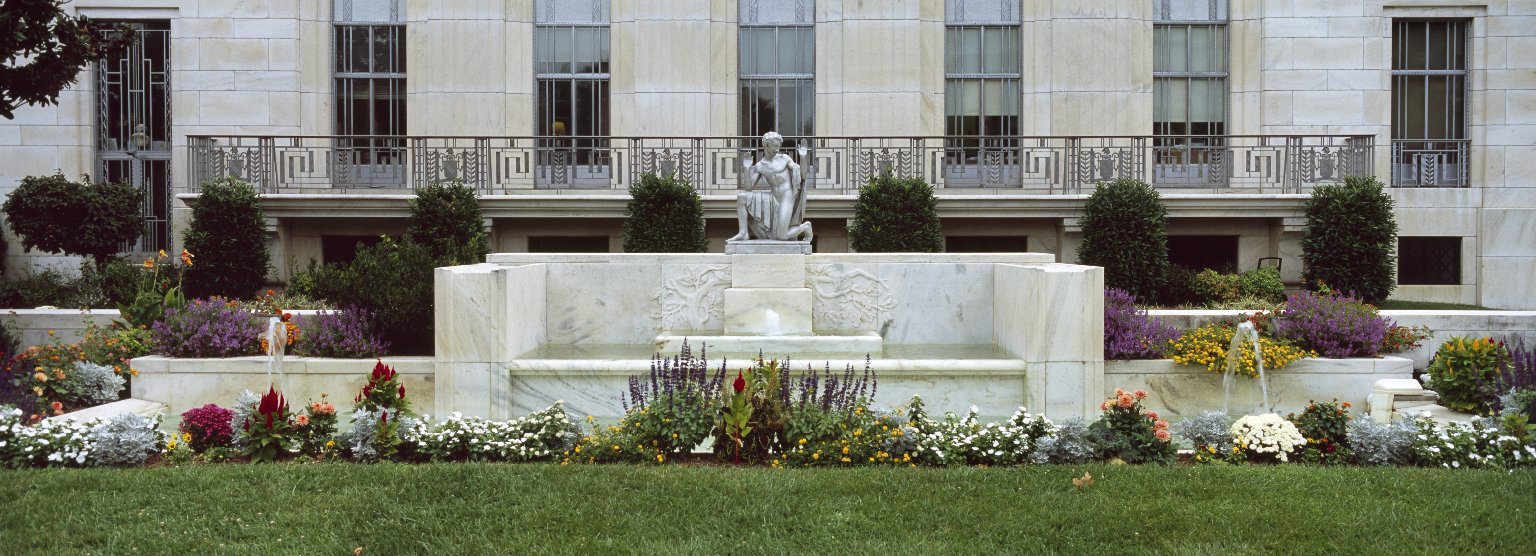
An aluminum casting of Brenda Putnam's original statue of Puck stands in the west garden of the Folger Shakespeare Library.

==== Renovations ====
The Folger Library and Theatre underwent major renovations from 2018-2024, closed to daytime visitors from January 2020 until its reopening on June 21, 2024. The renovations added a new learning lab, new exhibits, outdoor gardens featuring a new Juliet balcony, and a reimagined great hall with a cafe (Quill & Crumb).

== Library ==
=== Collection ===
The Folger houses the world's largest collection of Shakespeare-related material, from the 16th century to the present. The library is best known for its 82 copies of the 1623 First Folio (of which only 235 known copies survive) and over 200 quartos of Shakespeare's individual plays. Not restricted to Shakespeare, the Folger owns the world's third largest collection of English books printed before 1641, as well as substantial holdings of continental and later English imprints. The collection includes a wealth of items related to performance history: 250,000 playbills, 2,000 promptbooks, costumes, recordings and props. It also holds upwards of 90,000 paintings, prints, drawings, photographs, sculptures and other works of art.

The Folger's first catalog of its collection began in 1935, when Edwin Willoughby, a scholar of library science and the First Folio, began to catalog the book collection based on Alfred W. Pollard and Gilbert Richard Redgrave's Short-Title Catalogue. Though Willoughby developed a unique classification system based on the Folger's needs, in the late 1940s the Folger adopted that of the Library of Congress. In 1996, Folger staff and readers were given access to "Hamnet", the collection's first online catalog; the site became available to the public in 2000.

==== Printed books ====
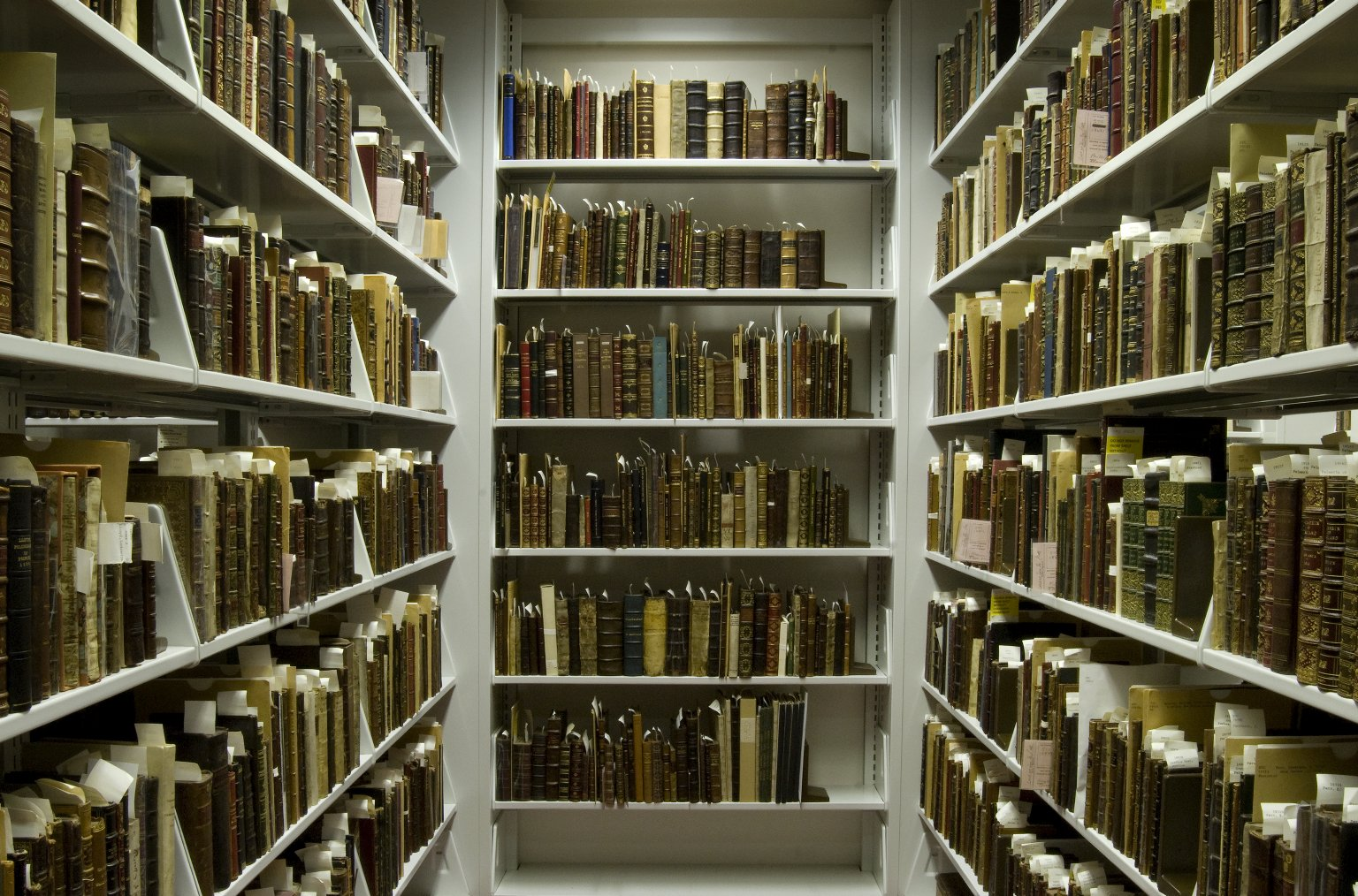
Rare books stored in the Folger's Vault

In all, the library collection includes more than 250,000 books, from the mid 15th century—when the printing press was invented—to the present day. In addition to its 82 First Folios, 229 early modern quartos of Shakespeare's plays and poems and 119 copies of the Second, Third, and Fourth Folios, the Folger holds some 7,000 later editions of Shakespeare from the 18th century to present, in more than 70 different languages. Beyond its Shakespearean texts, the library's collection includes over 18,000 early English books printed before 1640 and another 29,000 printed between 1641 and 1700. The library holds 35,000 early modern books printed on the European continent, about 450 of which are incunabula. The topics of these texts vary widely, ranging across literature, politics, religion, technology, military history and tactics, medicine, and over 2,000 volumes on the Protestant Reformation.

==== Manuscripts ====
The Folger holds some 60,000 manuscripts (from Elizabeth I and John Donne to Mark Twain and Walt Whitman). These handwritten documents date from the 15th to the 21st century and cover a variety of subjects: documents related to performance history and literature, personal correspondences, wills, love letters, and other materials of daily life. Notable manuscripts include the earliest known staging diagram in England, a list of quotations George Eliot compiled while writing Middlemarch, the 18th-century Shakespeare forgeries of William Henry Ireland, and the papers of legendary 18th-century actor David Garrick.

The Folger hosts Early Modern Manuscripts Online (EMMO), an IMLS-grant funded project to digitize and transcribe English manuscripts from the 16th and 17th centuries in a freely available digital collection. EMMO holds conferences, paleography classes, "transcrib-athons", and other events at the Folger and elsewhere.

==== Highlights of the collection ====
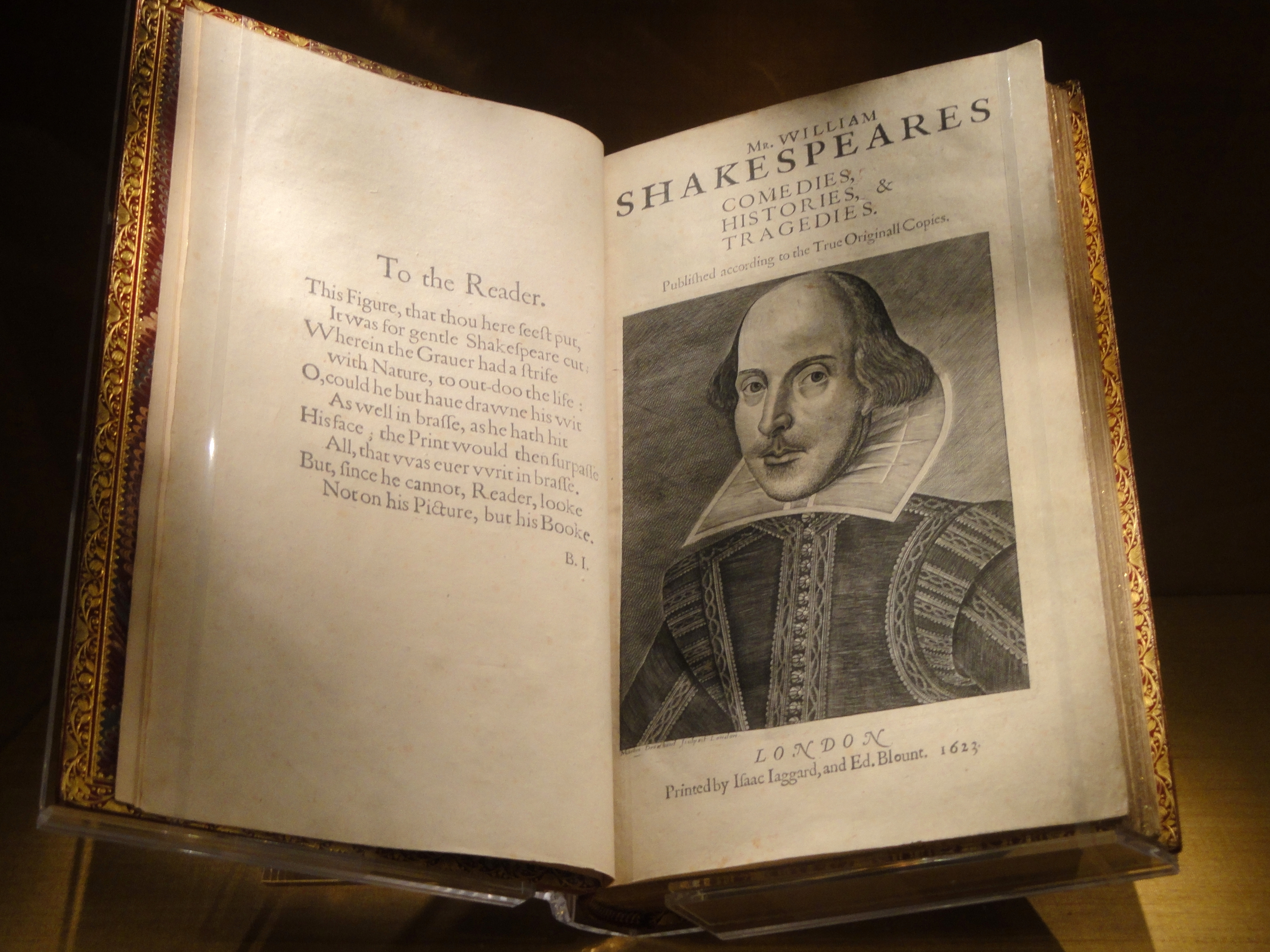
The First Folio on display at the library's museum

Significant items in the Folger's collection include:

- The only extant complete copy of Shakespeare's Titus Andronicus first quarto, published in 1594
- The False Folio
- The Macro Manuscript, a unique source for the three early morality plays: The Castle of Perseverance, Mankind and Wisdom. The manuscript also contains the earliest known staging diagram for any play in England.
- The Dering Manuscript, a single-play redaction of Henry IV, Part 1 and Henry IV, Part 2 that is the earliest known manuscript for any of Shakespeare's works.
- The Ashbourne portrait, the basis of several Oxfordian arguments
- Henry VIII's childhood copy of Cicero's De officiis, bearing an inscription in his hand, "Thys boke is myne Prynce Henry"
- The Trevelyon Miscellany of 1608, an oversized illustrated manuscript of 594 pages, depicting everything from the mundanities of daily life to biblical stories to contemporary political history
- The earliest Sieve Portrait of Queen Elizabeth I
- Thirteen of John Donne's letters detailing the personal crisis he faced upon marrying Anne More without her father's permission
- Thousands of pages of letters to and from prolific 18th-century actor David Garrick
- A large and significant collection of letters, mostly sent to the influential German Shakespeare scholar F. A. Leo (1820–1898), many of which related to the early history of the German Shakespeare Society, as well as a selection of German-language documents relating to Shakespeare. This collection was organized and edited by Werner Habicht.

== Research and education ==
Programs for advanced scholars, faculty, graduate students, and undergraduates are provided by the Folger Institute. Programs for K–12 teachers and students are provided by the Education department.

=== Folger Institute ===
The Folger Institute has served as the focus of scholarly research at the Folger since 1970. The Folger offers long- and short-term fellowships for advanced researchers across all disciplines, and hosts the two-week Amherst-Folger Undergraduate Fellowship program every January. The Institute holds a variety of colloquia, courses, workshops, and conferences for faculty, graduate students, and secondary educators. Scholarly programs run by the Folger Institute include the Folger Institute Consortium, a group that shares research and other resources among over 40 universities, the Center for Shakespeare Studies, which seeks depth and diversity in Shakespeare scholarship, and the Center for the History of British Political Thought founded in 1985, which promotes continued scholarship of three hundred years of British politics.

=== Education ===
Educational outreach at the Folger began in the early 1970s; today, the Folger Education department continues those early efforts with a variety of programs for K–12 students and teachers that emphasize an active learning approach to Shakespeare. Teachers gather at the Folger for day-long and month-long programs to work to incorporate Shakespeare and performance in the classroom. The department also publishes a variety of materials for classroom use. Student programs include workshops, local residency initiatives, and a high school fellowship program during which students study Shakespeare at the Folger. The Emily Jordan Folger Children's Shakespeare Festival, founded in 1980, allows elementary students to perform every spring. The Secondary School Shakespeare Festival, founded the following year, brings students from grades 7–12 to perform half-hour collections of Shakespeare scenes in the Folger theater.

==== Teaching Shakespeare Institute ====
The Teaching Shakespeare Institute (TSI) is an intensive four-week summer study program for middle- and high-school teachers hosted annually by the Folger Shakespeare Library's Education Department, with funding from the National Endowment for the Humanities. TSI participants work with experts to study a small number of Shakespearean plays in terms of scholarship, performance, and the classroom. 50 teachers participated in the inaugural program in 1984, but the annual number is now capped at 25. By 2015, over 775 teachers had gone through the program.

== Performances and events ==
The Folger Shakespeare Library's cultural and arts programs include Folger Theatre, Folger Consort, the O.B. Hardison Poetry Series and the PEN/Faulkner Foundation, as well as additional talks, screenings, lectures and exhibitions.

=== Folger Theatre ===
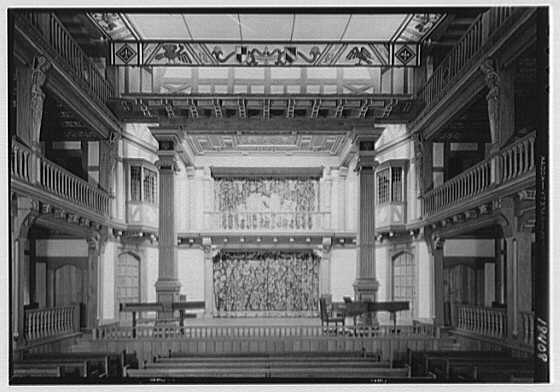
The library's historic theatre in 1932

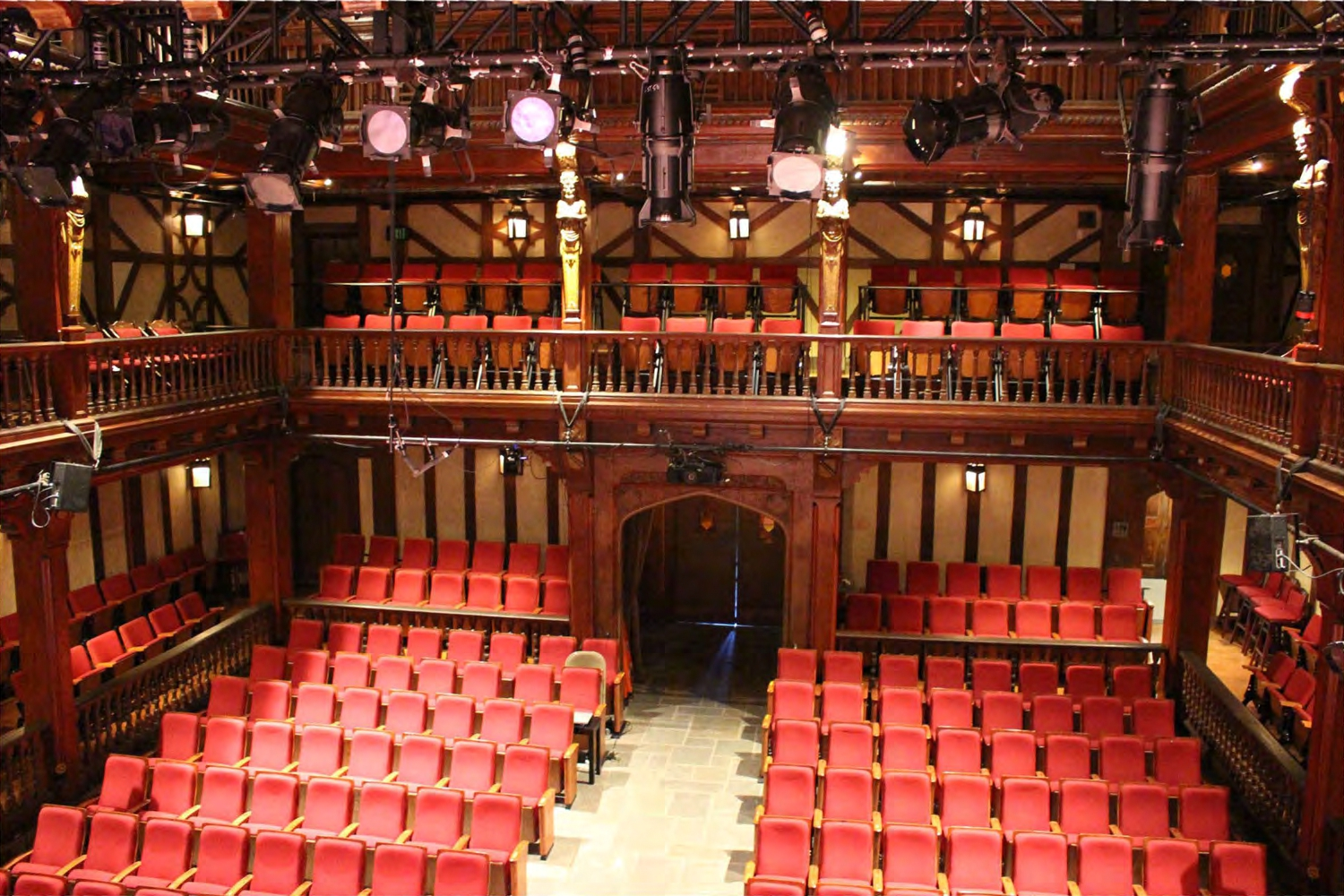
Seating area of the theatre

Folger Theatre performs a season of Shakespeare-inspired theater, featuring the works of Shakespeare as well as contemporary plays inspired by his works. Since its inception in 1992, Folger Theatre has staged over half of the plays in Shakespeare's First Folio. Productions have received 135 nominations for a Helen Hayes Award and won 23, including Outstanding Resident Play for its renditions of Measure for Measure (2007), Hamlet (2011) and The Taming of the Shrew (2013). From 1982 to 2021, the Folger Theatre's Artistic Producer was Janet Alexander Griffin. In 2021, Karen Ann Daniels was named director of programming and artistic director. Performances occur in the theater at the east end of the building.

=== Folger Consort ===
Folger Consort is the library's resident early music ensemble, founded in 1977 by its artistic directors Robert Eisenstein and Christopher Kendall. The Consort performs medieval music, Renaissance music, and baroque music in its concert series. The Consort performs regularly at the Elizabethan Theatre, at the Washington National Cathedral and at the Music Center at Strathmore. The Consort also holds seminars, discussions, and radio broadcasts. Since 2006, Folger Consort has won Best Classical Chamber Ensemble five times at the Washington Area Music Awards.

=== O.B. Hardison Poetry Series ===
Since 1970, the Folger has hosted contemporary poets for readings, moderated conversation, and Q&As in what is now called the O.B. Hardison Poetry series, after former director of the Folger, O.B. Hardison Jr. Past poets involved in the series include Octavio Paz, Gwendolyn Brooks, Allen Ginsberg, W. S. Merwin, Adrienne Rich, Yusef Komunyakaa, James Merrill, Frank Bidart, Robert Pinsky, Derek Walcott, Hayden Carruth, Rita Dove, Seamus Heaney, Sterling Brown, Denise Levertov, June Jordan, Lawrence Ferlinghetti, Sonia Sanchez, and James Dickey. Between 1991 and 2009, the series also awarded the O. B. Hardison Jr. Poetry Prize, which was awarded by the library to a U.S. poet who has published at least one book within the last five years, has made important contributions as a teacher, and is committed to furthering the understanding of poetry.

=== PEN/Faulkner ===
In conjunction with the PEN/Faulkner Foundation, the Folger hosts the PEN/Faulkner Reading Series, which brings contemporary authors to the Folger for public readings of fiction. The Folger also hosts the annual PEN/Faulkner Award for Fiction readings, which celebrate the year's finalists and winners.

== Digital resources ==
The Folger offers several online tools to assist in research and scholarship, including the following:

- The Digital Image Collection (also known as "LUNA"), which provides over 80,000 images of the collection, including manuscripts, books and art. The images in the collection are available under a Creative Commons license.
- Folgerpedia, the Folger's in-house wiki; a collaboratively-edited encyclopedia providing information about the institution, the collection, and other relevant information
- "All Shakespeare's works", online editions of Shakespeare's plays and poems
- Early Modern Manuscripts Online, images of manuscripts and promotes transcribing paleography

== Leadership ==
To date, seven directors and three acting directors have overseen Library affairs. Michael Witmore, a scholar with particular interest in the digital analysis of Shakespeare's texts, became the Folger's seventh director on July 1, 2011.

1. William A. Slade (1931–1934)
2. Joseph Quincy Adams (1934–1936, acting; 1936–1946, director)
3. James McManaway (1946–1948, acting)
4. Louis Booker Wright (1948–1968)
5. Philip A. Knachel (1968–1969, acting)
6. O.B. Hardison Jr. (1969–1983)
7. Philip A. Knachel (1983–1984, acting)
8. Werner Gundersheimer (1984–2002)
9. Gail Kern Paster (2002–2011)
10. Michael Witmore (2011–2024)
11. Dr. Farah Karim Cooper (2024- )

== See also ==
- Book collecting
