= Emily Jordan Folger =

American Shakespeare collector (1858–1936)

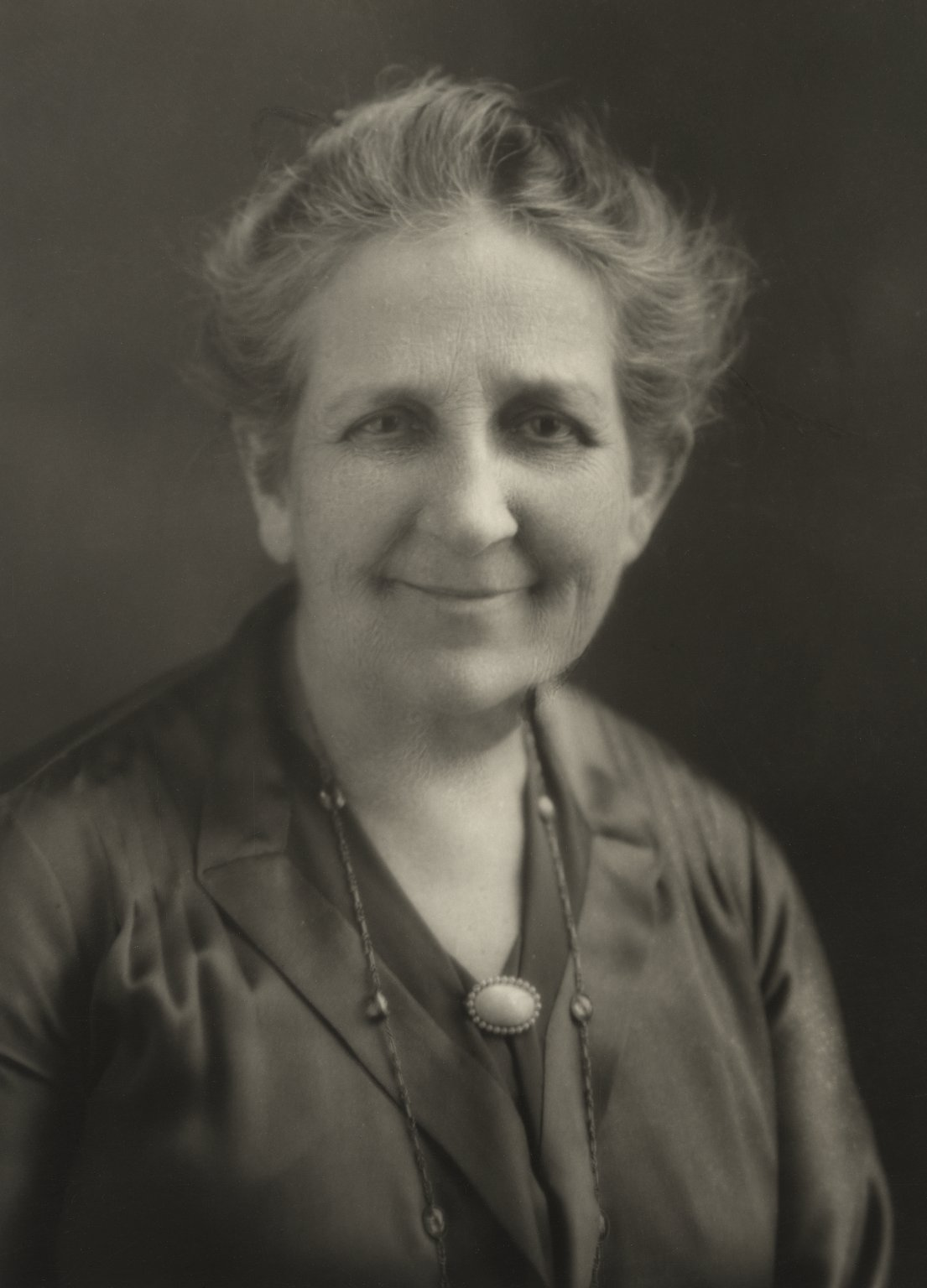
- Born: Emily Clara Jordan; 15 May 1858; Ironton, Ohio
- Died: 21 February 1936 (aged 77); Glen Cove, Long Island
- Education: Miss Ranney's School; Vassar College
- Known for: Folger Shakespeare Library
- Spouse(s): Henry Clay Folger (1885–1930; his death)
- Parent(s): Edward W. Jordan; Augusta Woodbury Ricker

Emily Jordan Folger (May 15, 1858 – February 21, 1936) was the co-founder of the Folger Shakespeare Library alongside her husband Henry Clay Folger. During her husband's lifetime, she assisted him in building the world's largest collection of Shakespeare materials. After his death in 1930, she funded the completion of the Folger Shakespeare Library to house the collection, remaining involved with its administration until her death in 1936.

In 1932, she became the third woman to receive an honorary degree from Amherst College, following Mary Emma Woolley, president of Mount Holyoke College, in 1901; and Martha Dickinson Bianchi, editor of Emily Dickinson's poems, in 1931.

== Early life and career ==
Emily Clara Jordan was born in Ironton, Ohio to Edward W. Jordan and his wife, Augusta Woodbury Ricker. She was the third of their three daughters, preceded by Mary Augusta and Elizabeth. Edward Jordan served as Solicitor of the Treasury Department under Presidents Abraham Lincoln and Andrew Johnson, and her family lived in Washington, D.C., for that part of her childhood. Emily received her early education at Miss Ranney's School in Elizabeth, New Jersey, which prepared women for teaching or higher education. There, Emily was instructed in English language and literature, modern languages, mathematics, philosophy, and the natural sciences.

In 1875, she followed both of her sisters to Vassar College, where she was elected president of the 36-member class of 1879. At Vassar, Emily was accomplished in English composition and astronomy. She was educated in the latter subject by astronomer and Vassar professor Maria Mitchell, who was also a distant relative of her future husband, Henry Clay Folger, via their common ancestor, Peter Foulger. After graduating from Vassar in 1879, she worked in Brooklyn for six years as an instructor in the college-prep section of a private girls' school, Miss Hotchkiss's Nassau Institute.

== Marriage ==
Emily was introduced to Henry Clay Folger as early as 1880, at a meeting of the Irving Literary Circle of Brooklyn by Lillie Pratt, sister of Charles Pratt, with whom Folger attended Amherst College. At an 1882 club picnic, the Pratts prompted toasts from both Emily and Henry, who quoted Othello and As You Like It, respectively. Folger was a graduate of Columbia Law School, and a young oil-company executive, who later became the president and then the chairman of Standard Oil of New York. Little else is known about their courtship; on October 6, 1885, Emily married Henry at Westminster Presbyterian Church in Elizabeth, New Jersey, where Emily had spent her teenage years. After the wedding, the Folgers moved into a Brooklyn home with Folger's parents. For many years, they lived in rented homes in Brooklyn, moving to Bedford-Stuyvesant in 1895, and to 24 Brevoort Place in 1910. They ultimately purchased an estate in Glen Cove, Long Island, in 1929.

They often stayed at The Homestead resort in Hot Springs, Virginia. The Folgers had no children, and considered their vast collection of Shakespeareana and Early Modern objects their descendants.

== Shakespeare collecting ==
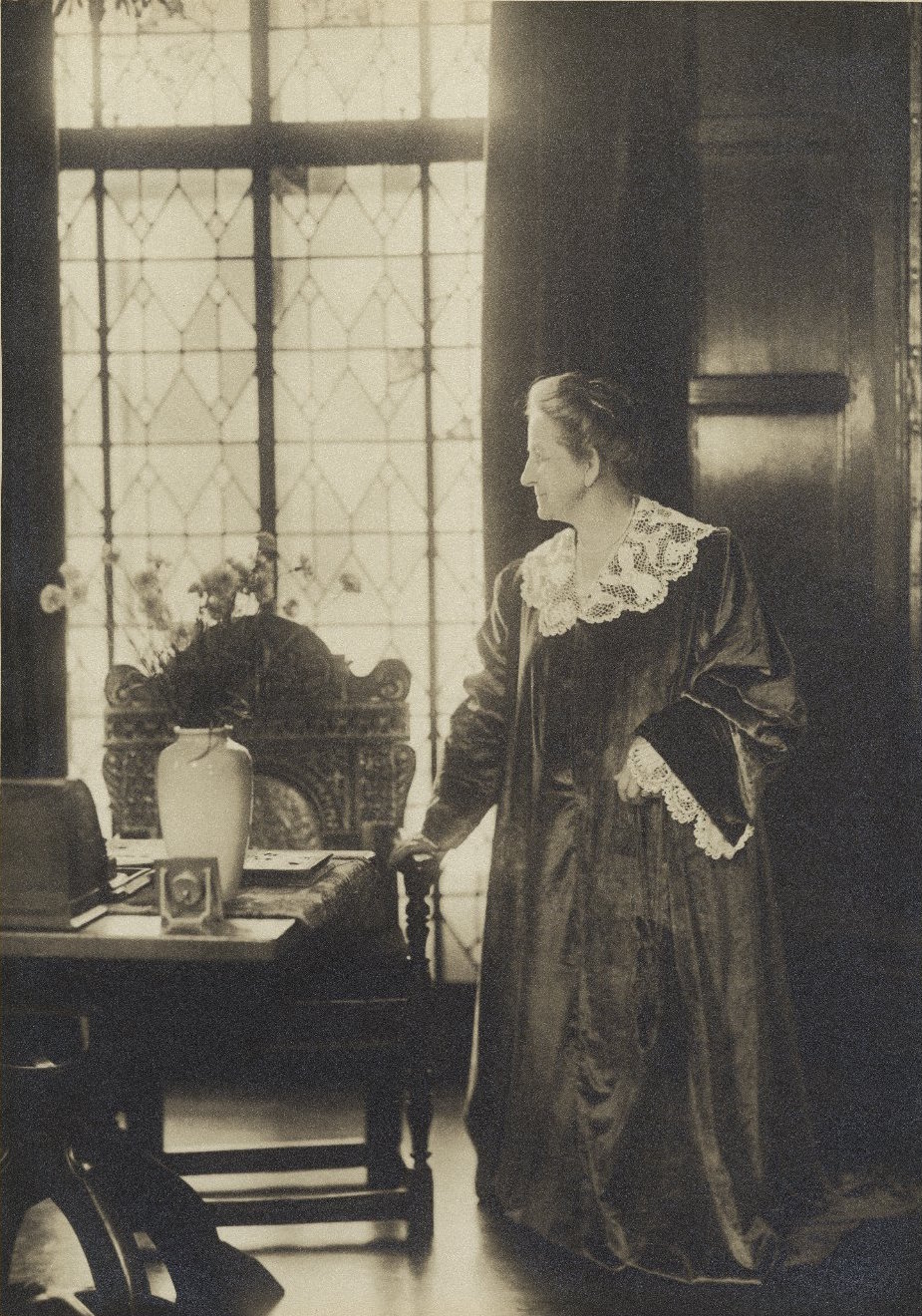
Folger, in the Folger Shakespeare Library's Founders' Room, wearing Julia Marlowe's Portia costume, 1932

During their marriage, Henry Folger's interest in the works of Shakespeare led him to gather the world's largest private Shakespeare collection. The couple's pursuit of rare items often began with Emily, who pored over booksellers' catalogs, marking items of interest to herself and to her husband. Later, Henry sorted through the catalogs and her notes to determine a set list of items on which to bid. Once items were purchased, Emily generated a catalog card for each acquisition, and cross-referenced these cards with the booksellers' catalogs to either avoid duplicate copies or upgrade to a better copy of a particular work. Their card catalog was stored in one of Standard Oil's Brooklyn warehouses.

Emily Folger helped to catalog the acquisitions, traveled with her husband on many transatlantic collecting trips, researched possible acquisitions, and often advised him on purchases. She earned an M.A. from Vassar in 1896 for a thesis on "The True Text of Shakespeare", a survey of current scholarship on the subject. She also corresponded with Horace Howard Furness, a leading American Shakespeare editor. Among the Shakespearean societies she and Henry joined as a result of their collecting were the Malone Society, the Oxford Bibliographic Society, and the Shakespeare Club in England, as well as the American Shakespeare Foundation, the Shakespeare Association of America, and the National Shakespeare Federation in the United States.

The Folgers occasionally wrote Shakespearean actresses, like Ellen Terry and Julia Marlowe, to inquire about the purchase of manuscripts, props, and costumes used by the actresses. Among these acquisitions was the purple robe worn by Marlowe during her performance of Portia in The Merchant of Venice, which Emily wore when she prepared to bathe at the Homestead. Emily also kept a diary from 1906 to 1930 that recorded her responses to live performances of Shakespeare. The diary records Henry's reactions, as well as her own, to a production's actors, scenery, costumes, and direction.

After her husband's death, Emily continued to add to the Library's collection; these acquisitions included the Ashbourne portrait, which she incorrectly believed to be of William Shakespeare.

== Folger Shakespeare Library ==
By about 1918, the Folgers began planning for a library to house the collection. The project and its chosen site in Washington became public in 1928, after the land had been assembled. Henry Folger retired from Standard Oil to devote himself to the project, but he died unexpectedly in 1930 during a hospital stay. At the time, construction had just started. Because of the 1929 stock-market crash, Henry Folger's estate was greatly reduced and could not cover the full cost of building and opening the library. Emily Folger, who served as executor of her husband's estate, donated millions of dollars of her own funds to finish construction and operate the library. She received an honorary doctorate in 1932 from Amherst College for her role in making the library possible.

At an opening ceremony in April 1932, Emily Folger turned over the key to the Folger Shakespeare Library to its trustees, saying that she did so for her husband and herself. She remained active in the library's administration for the rest of her life. Her sister Mary Augusta Jordan, who had been a professor at Vassar and Smith College, funded the Library's first research scholarship.

== Later life and death ==
Emily's involvement with the Library continued after its opening; beginning in 1934, she supported California actress Florence Locke in the latter's efforts to perform Ellen Terry's lectures on Shakespeare's Triumphant Women. When in Washington, she served afternoon tea in the Founders' Room until she became too sick to do so.

After enduring many months of heart problems, Emily died of heart failure on February 21, 1936, at her estate in Glen Cove, Long Island, the same day Locke performed Terry's Antony and Cleopatra lecture in the Folger Library's Elizabethan Theatre. Her eulogy was delivered by the Reverend Samuel Parkes Cadman of Brooklyn's Central Congregational Church. Her ashes were interred, alongside her husband's, in what is now the Old Reading Room of their Folger Shakespeare Library. Emily's will strongly mirrored that of her husband's; though her siblings, nieces, and nephews received bequests, the bulk of her estate was left to the Library, to be administered alongside the remainder of her husband's estate.

== Legacy ==
In 2025, Emily was referenced in a Final Jeopardy! clue with a quote about her husband (In 1896 the Vassar-educated wife of this man wrote, "thousands of dollars may be paid for a copy of Shakespeare"). In a strange coincidence, her great-great-great-niece, Emily Croke, was a contestant on that day's episode, and got the clue correct to win the game.
