= Henry Clay Folger =

American Shakespeare collector and businessman (1857–1930)

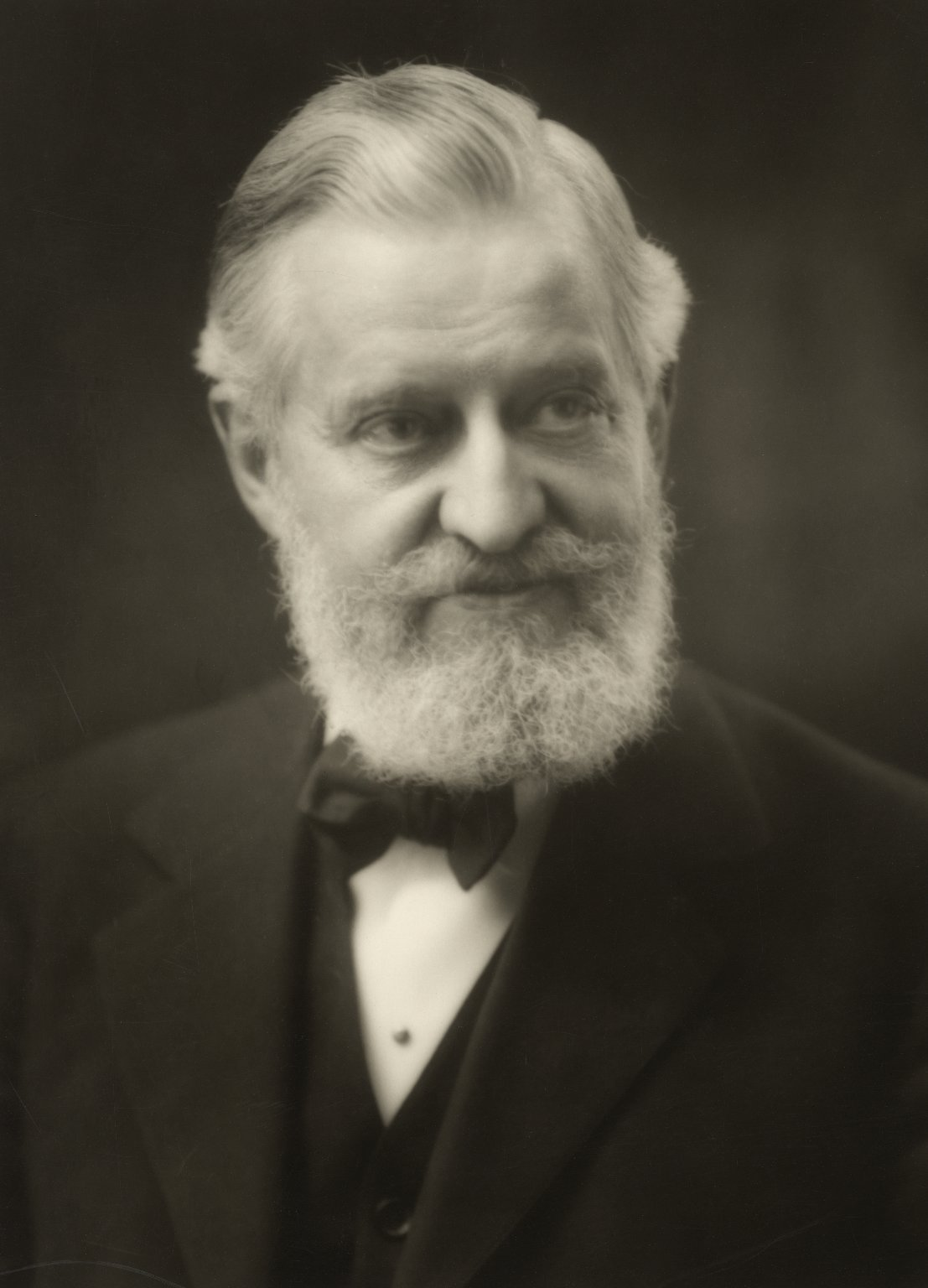
- Born: Henry Clay Folger; 18 June 1857; New York City
- Died: 11 June 1930 (aged 72); Brooklyn, New York
- Education: Adelphi Academy of Brooklyn; Amherst College; Columbia Law School
- Known for: Folger Shakespeare Library
- Spouse(s): Emily Jordan Folger (1885–1930; his death)
- Parent(s): Henry Clay Folger Sr. Eliza Jane Clark

Henry Clay Folger Jr. (June 18, 1857 – June 11, 1930) was an American businessman who was president and later chairman of Standard Oil of New York, a collector of Shakespeareana, and co-founder of the Folger Shakespeare Library alongside his wife Emily Jordan Folger.

== Early life ==
Henry Clay Folger Jr. was born in New York City to Henry Clay Folger Sr. of Nantucket, Massachusetts, and Eliza Jane (Clark) Folger of New York, the eldest of their eight children. He was a first cousin six times removed of Benjamin Franklin and a nephew of J. A. Folger, the founder of Folger Coffee. He descended from Peter Foulger (the maternal grandfather of Benjamin Franklin) and Mary Foulger (née Morrill).

He graduated from Adelphi Academy, in Brooklyn, New York, where Charles Pratt, the businessman and president of Adelphi's board of trustees, became a mentor to him. At Adelphi, Folger was schooled in art, chemistry, classics, and recitation, and was elected president of the school's literary association. He then attended Amherst College with Charles Millard Pratt, a close friend and son of Folger's mentor at Adelphi. To fund his education, Folger competed in many oratorical essay contests, winning prizes in 1876 and again in 1879, which paid for his junior year of school. Folger modeled his rhetorical style on Daniel Webster's. He identified a Shakespeare-related essay contest as the origin of his obsession with the Bard. His wife, Emily, however, would later attribute Folger's initial fascination with Shakespeare to an 1879 lecture by Ralph Waldo Emerson, whose eloquent delivery sounded Shakespearean to the college student. At Amherst, Folger was a member of the Alpha Delta Phi fraternity, graduating Phi Beta Kappa in 1879. Following graduation, he attended Columbia Law School from 1879 to 1881, gaining admittance to the bar in 1881.

Folger in 1879, the year he graduated from Amherst College

== Career ==
Beginning in 1881, he worked for the Standard Oil trust of John D. Rockefeller, getting his start in the oil business as a clerk at Charles Pratt & Company, a refinery owned by Charles Pratt, the father of his Adelphi and Amherst classmate Charles Millard Pratt. The Pratt Company was already associated with Standard Oil at that time. Folger quickly showed his prowess as a mathematician and statistician; his management of data on oil processing led to a promotion in 1886, when he became the secretary of Standard Oil's manufacturing committee. In 1890, Folger wrote Petroleum: Its Production and Products in Pennsylvania, an article for Chambers's Encyclopaedia about the oil business.

Folger's assets increased in 1899, when he was promoted to chairman of the manufacturing committee, the same year that Standard Oil of New Jersey became the central holding company for the Standard Oil Trust, which dissolved after the passage of the Sherman Antitrust Act. The stock Folger held in Standard Oil of New Jersey would contribute significantly to Folger's ability to collect Shakespeareana. In 1908, he was elected assistant treasurer of Jersey Standard, and joined its board of sixteen directors, managing the company's finances and compiling production data. That year, Folger was also elected to Jersey Standard's executive committee.

The 1911 Supreme Court decision to break up the Standard Oil Company of New Jersey monopoly resulted in the election of Folger as president of the second-largest company formed from the dissolved Jersey Standard, the Standard Oil Company of New York, or Socony. Folger also owned significant amounts of stock in the Magnolia Petroleum Company, a Texan company that became a fully owned subsidiary of Socony in 1925. He retired as president in 1923, but stayed at Socony as the first chairman of its board of trustees until 1928, when he officially retired to devote all of his attention to plans for his Shakespeare Library. Folger was succeeded as president by Herbert L. Pratt, another son of Charles Pratt.

In 1956, the Folger Shakespeare Library received Folger's walnut desk from Socony Mobil Oil. Since that year, it has been used by the Library's director.

== Marriage to Emily Clara Jordan ==
Henry Clay Folger met Emily Clara Jordan in the early 1880s at a meeting of the Irving Literary Circle in Brooklyn. Both were close, respectively, with the Pratt siblings Charles and Lillie. Early in their relationship, Henry and Emily connected via Shakespeare. At an 1882 picnic held by the Irving Literary Circle, Charles and Lillie prompted the two to each give a toast; Emily drew from Othello. while Henry quoted from As You Like It. She was born in 1858 and was educated at Vassar College. They married on October 6, 1885 at Westminster Presbyterian Church in Elizabeth, New Jersey, where Emily had spent her teenage years. The Folgers had no children. They lived in rented houses in Brooklyn throughout most of their lives, moving to Bedford-Stuyvesant in 1895 and to 24 Brevoot Place in 1910, but later purchased an estate in Glen Cove, Long Island in 1929.

The Folgers took annual vacations to The Homestead resort in Hot Springs, Virginia, where Henry enjoyed participating in golf tournaments in his later years. Though the Folgers had no children, they considered their collection to be their descendants, and Henry was known to refer to his rare books as "the boys".

== Shakespeare collecting ==
Folger was an avid collector of Shakespeareana, assembling the world's largest collection of First Folio editions of Shakespeare's plays. The first rare book Folger acquired was a 1685 copy of the Fourth Folio, purchased in 1889 for $107.50. He purchased his first original copy of the First Folio four years later, in 1893. Unlike other wealthy collectors of the period, like Henry E. Huntington and J.P. Morgan, Folger favored "imperfect" copies of rare volumes, with their marginalia and other markings. Following this trend, his Folio collection was marked with diversity in provenance and condition. He preferred to purchase Early Editions of books published between 1567 and 1606, in addition to manuscripts of the period. Based on their collective knowledge of Latin and French, and Emily's proficiency in German, the couple also favored rare volumes published on the Continent in the sixteenth and seventeenth centuries. The couple was less interested in art collection, and many of the Shakespeare-related paintings they purchased were misattributed to artists like Thomas Gainsborough.

The Folgers chose items to purchase from booksellers' catalogues, which were initially perused and marked up by Emily, before she passed them on to Henry, who kept an extensive and precise list of items he intended to bid on. If possible, he inspected an item personally before purchasing it. He also avoided consulting scholarly experts about rare volumes, preferring his own and Emily's expertise, as she received an M.A. from Vassar College in 1896 for a thesis on Shakespeare. Folger used professional booksellers as middlemen at auctions, believing that the concealment of his identity would keep prices low. Due to the growing size of the collection and their concern for fireproofing, eventually few of the Folgers' acquisitions were stored in their living space. They kept an extensive card catalog at home in Brooklyn, and when traveling, took a smaller, annotated set of check lists along with them. The collection itself was stored among several fireproof warehouse companies throughout Manhattan, in specially designed wooden cases originally meant to hold two five-gallon cans of oil each. Frederick Fales, a co-worker of Folger's at Standard Oil, initially designed and ordered these air-tight wooden cases for company use. Some of the most valuable items were kept in bank vaults, or in a safe in Folger's office.

Folger financed a half-century of collecting with his Standard Oil salary and extensive investments in the company. His high placement at Standard Oil also allowed him to take out loans with his friend Charles Millard Pratt, John D. Rockefeller, and even his wife, to fund his purchases. He generally paid for items in cash, a strategy that earned him the favor of many booksellers who needed immediate funds. Folger also preferred to purchase whole collections, like the Halliwell-Phillipps collection, acquired in 1908, because bulk purchases drove down prices of individual items.

In 1909, Folger established a Shakespeare Prize at Amherst; winning students won a cash prize, and their essays joined Folger's collection and later the Folger Shakespeare Library. Folger also made donations to Amherst College's library, contributing many duplicate volumes purchased at auction to the College. The most valuable of these donations were two leaves from a Gutenberg Bible.

== Folger Shakespeare Library ==
Early in his career at Standard Oil and as a collector, Folger doubted that he would eventually have the funds to build a memorial or library for his growing collection, and in 1895 he offered to sell it to John D. Rockefeller, who refused. Before he acquired the funds for what was to become the Folger Shakespeare Library, Folger also debated selling the collection to a university.

Toward the end of World War I, Folger and his wife began searching for a location for his Shakespeare library. Among the sites he and Emily considered were Amherst and Nantucket, Massachusetts, the University of Chicago, New York City, and Stratford-upon-Avon, before they settled on a Washington, D.C. site they discovered in 1918 during a layover in the city while traveling to Hot Springs. Folger spent nine years purchasing the fourteen row houses that occupied the block of East Capitol Street between First and Second Streets, which he would demolish to build his Library; thus, they did not make their choice of a site on Capitol Hill public until 1928. Soon afterwards, Congress passed a resolution allowing use of the land on East Capitol Street where the Folger Shakespeare Library stands.

After the passage of this legislation, Folger hired Paul Philippe Cret as the Library's architect, suggested by Alexander Trowbridge, an architect who had married into the Pratt family and stayed on the project as consulting architect. Folger played an integral part in the design and execution of the Library's classical exterior and Tudor interior. The inclusion of an Elizabethan theater within the Library's main building was also Folger's idea, though he intended it as a venue for academic lectures rather than performances. Folger hired sculptor John Gregory to design the relief sculptures that appear on the building's facade. The cornerstone of the library was laid in 1930, but Henry Folger died soon afterward. The bulk of his fortune was left in trust for the library, with Amherst College as trust administrator. With additional funding from Emily Folger, the library opened in 1932 on April 23, the date traditionally believed to be Shakespeare's birthday. Folger's collection of Shakespearean works is considered one of the most important resources for scholars of the playwright.

== Other interests and activities ==
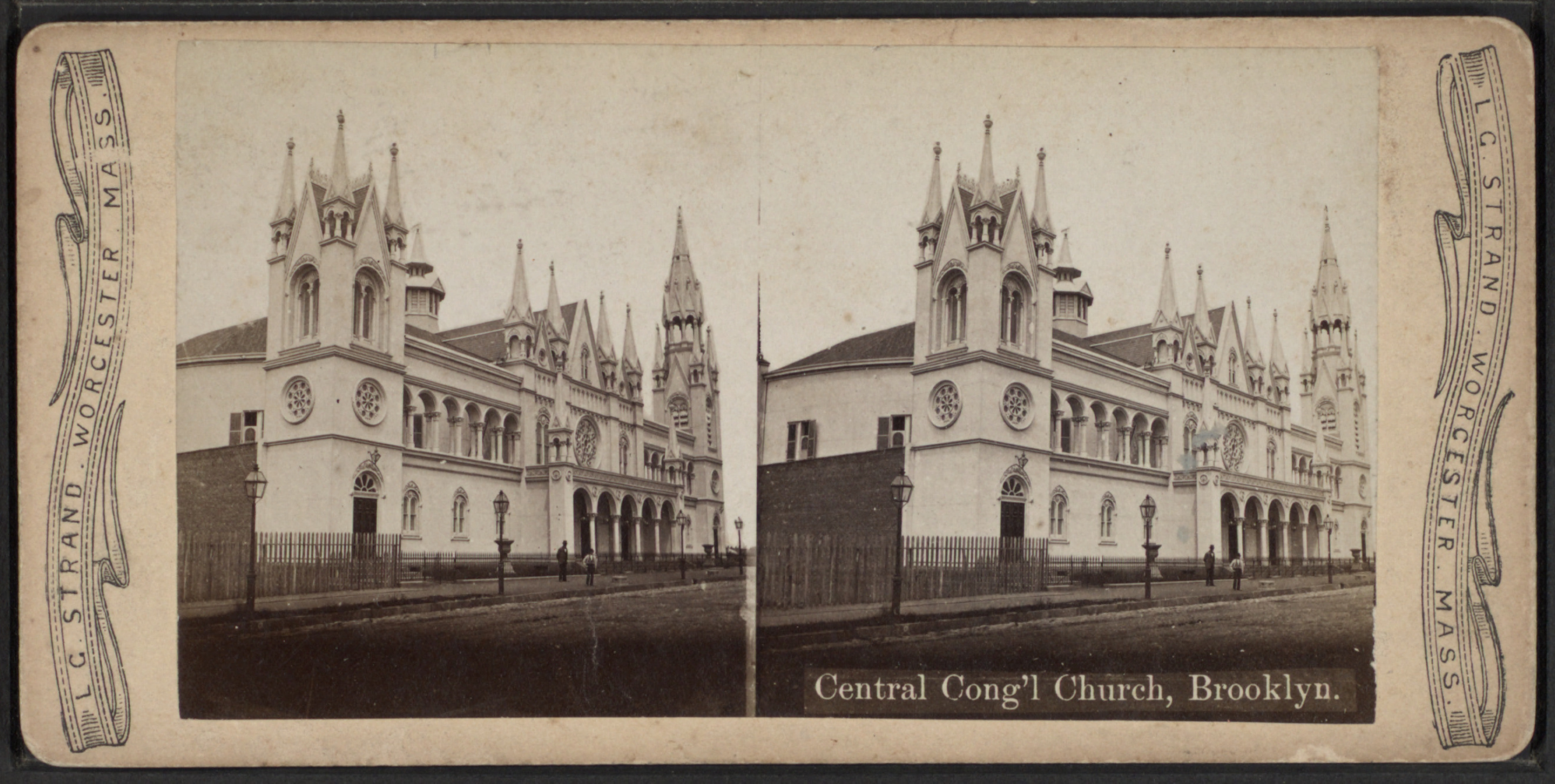
Central Congregational Church

Folger was a trustee of the Hamilton Trust Company, Brooklyn, New York, and a director of Seaboard National Bank in New York. In 1914 he was awarded an honorary Doctor of Letters degree from Amherst. Outside of work, his great interests were his Shakespeare collection and, in later life, golf, which he often played with Rockefeller. He was a trustee of the Central Congregational Church in Brooklyn and established the Shakespeare Garden at the Brooklyn Botanic Garden.

In a 1933 lecture delivered after his death, Emily identified King Lear as his favorite of Shakespeare's plays.

== Death ==
In May 1930, Henry Folger was admitted to St. John's Hospital in Brooklyn for surgery on an enlarged prostate. While recovering, he continued to work on the construction and development of his Shakespeare Library from his sickbed. He had a second prostate operation prior to his death on June 11, 1930. His funeral was held at Brooklyn's Central Congregational Church, where he had been an active member. Reverend Samuel Parkes Cadman, who, along with his wife, had been close with the Folgers, gave Henry's eulogy. Henry's ashes were interred beneath the Folgers' reproduction of Shakespeare's funerary monument in what became the Folger Shakespeare Library's Old Reading Room. His wife Emily died in 1936.

== Writings ==
Folger wrote Petroleum: Its Production and Products and articles on Shakespeare and Shakespeareana.
