= Deutsche Shakespeare-Gesellschaft =

Literary society

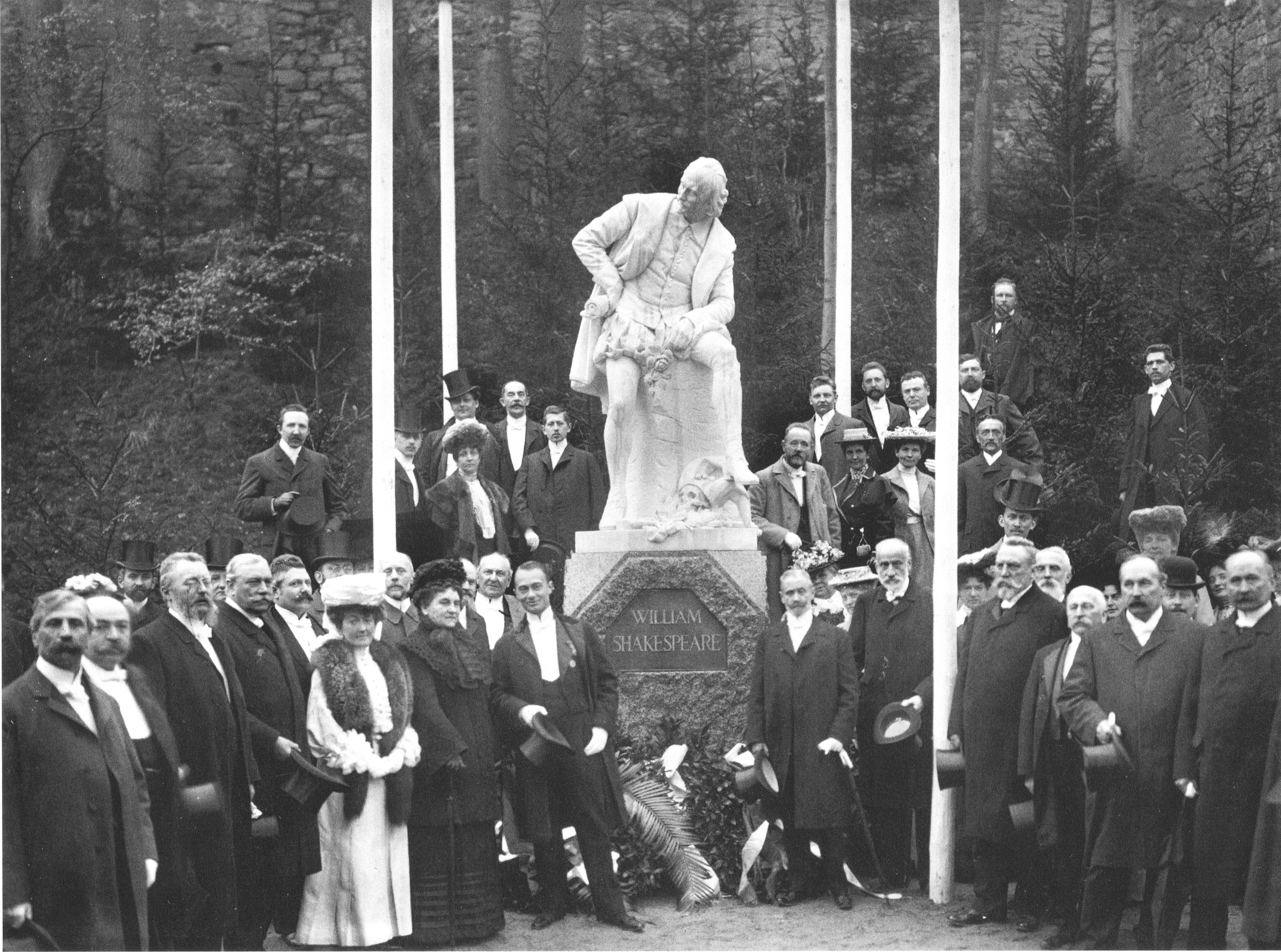
Inauguration of the Shakespeare monument in the Park an der Ilm in Weimar by Deutsche Shakespeare Gesellschaft in 1904

The Deutsche Shakespeare-Gesellschaft (German Shakespeare Society) was founded on the occasion of the 300th birthday of William Shakespeare on 23 April 1864. It was the first scientific and cultural association of its type in Weimar, and is one of the oldest functioning literary societies in the world.
