= State and National Law School =

Law school in New York state (1849–1865)

- Former names: New York State and National Law School; Ballston Law College; Fowler's State and National Law School.
- Type: private
- Active: 1849–1865
- Founder: John W. Fowler
- President: John W. Fowler
- Location: Ballston Spa, then Poughkeepsie, New York, USA

The State and National Law School was an early practical training law school founded in 1849 by John W. Fowler in Ballston Spa, New York. It was also known as New York State and National Law School, Ballston Law College, and Fowler's State and National Law School. In 1853 the school relocated to Poughkeepsie, New York; it closed in 1865.

== History ==
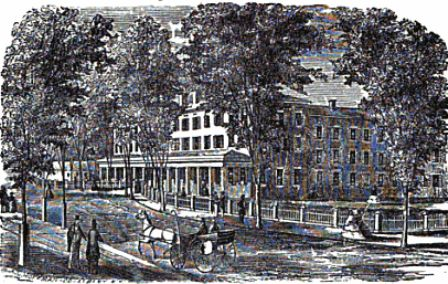
Sans Souci Hotel, Ballston Spa, New York. Hand colored.

Founded in 1849 by John W. Fowler, the school was one of the first in the country to provide practical training for law students, rather than just academic lectures on legal theories. The school began in the former Sans Souci Hotel in Ballston Spa, but only stayed in the facility for three years.

The school was under the supervision of a board of trustees appointed by the New York State Legislature.

The National Law School used very advanced teaching methods for its time. "There, students were assembled into mock courtroom scenarios, playing all of the roles witnesses, bailiffs, jurors, and attorneys. The professors were the judges, and the teams of attorneys were given a set of facts to work with to build their case."

It had a chapter of Theta Delta Chi from 1849 to 1851.

The institution struggled financially and also encountered problems with its facilities in Ballston Spa. President Fowler decided to relocate the law school to Poughkeepsie in late 1852.

In January 1853, the school opened for its first term in Poughkeepsie. The reasons given for the move as stated by the trustees: "The building in Ballston is old and the rooms are cold, while in Poughkeepsie our accommodations are comfortable and pleasant. The village to which we have removed is much larger and more pleasant than Ballston, containing six or eight flourishing Literary Institutions, of which four are Female Seminaries. The people of Poughkeepsie furnish, besides these Libraries, adequate funds to place the institution on a high and permanent basis."

=== Degrees granted ===
The board was authorized to confer upon each graduate the degree of LL.B. (Bachelor of Laws).

=== Closure ===
The law school closed in 1865 as the result of declining enrollment caused by potential students joining the military during the American Civil War. Fowler went on to teach at the American Business College in Springfield, Massachusetts.

== Notable alumni ==
Despite its short tenure, the law school produced many prominent alumni:

- Chester A. Arthur, 1854, President of the United States
- Sullivan Ballou, 1852, Union Army officer featured in Ken Burns's "The Civil War"
- Levi W. Barden, 1852, member of the Wisconsin State Assembly and the Wisconsin State Senate
- Washington Bushnell, 1853, Illinois Attorney General and member of the Illinois State Senate
- Angus Cameron, 1853, United States Senator from Wisconsin
- Charles S. Cary, 1850, Solicitor of the United States Treasury and railroad and banking executive
- Julius Curtis, 1850, judge, and member of the Connecticut Senate
- Benjamin W. Dean, 1849, Secretary of State of Vermont
- Ralph Hill, 1851, United States Representative from Indiana
- William W. Grout, 1857, United States Representative from Vermont.
- Tim N. Machin, 1849, Lieutenant Governor of California
- Samuel D. McEnery, 1859, United States Senator/Governor of Louisiana
- John F. Miller, 1852, United States Senator from California
- Henry Wilbur Palmer, 1860, United States Representative from Pennsylvania
- James Innes Randolph, Lawyer, poet, topographical engineer, and Confederate Army major. Most famous poem was I'm A Good Ol' Rebel
- Niles Searls, 1849, Chief Justice of California Supreme Court
- Lionel Allen Sheldon, 1853, United States Representative from Louisiana
- Julius L. Strong, 1853, United States Representative from Connecticut
- Ormsby B. Thomas, 1856, United States Representative from Wisconsin
- Henry D. Washburn, 1853, United States Representative from Indiana
- William Brewster Williams, 1851, United States Representative from Michigan

== See also ==
- Law of New York
- List of defunct colleges and universities in New York
- List of defunct law schools in the United States
