= Joseph Bowers (disambiguation) =

Joseph Bowers (born Josef Ebner, 1897–1936) was the first man to attempt an escape from Alcatraz.

Joseph Bowers is also the name of:

- Joseph Oliver Bowers (1910–2012), Catholic bishop from Dominica
- Joe Bowers (Joseph Bowers, died 1946), British rugby league footballer

== See also ==
- "Joe Bowers" (song), an American folk song from the 1850s
- Joseph Bowers House, in the Iron County MRA, Michigan, United States
