= Bluford Wilson =

American lawyer

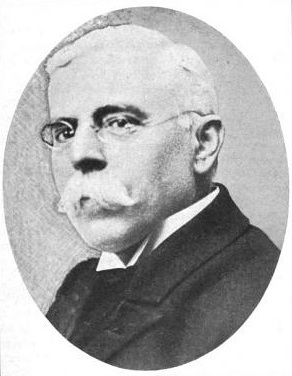

Solicitor of the United States Treasury
- In office 1874–1876
- Preceded by: E. C. Banfield
- Succeeded by: George F. Talbot

United States Attorney for the Southern District of Illinois
- In office 1869–1874
- Preceded by: John E. Rosette
- Succeeded by: John P. Van Dorston

Personal details
- Born: November 30, 1841 Shawneetown, Illinois, US
- Died: July 15, 1924 (aged 82) Springfield, Illinois, US
- Resting place: Oak Ridge Cemetery, Springfield, Illinois
- Party: Republican
- Spouse: Alice Warren Mather (m. 1865)
- Relations: James H. Wilson (Brother)
- Children: 5 (Including Arthur H. Wilson)
- Education: McKendree College; University of Michigan Law School
- Profession: Attorney

Military service
- Allegiance: United States; Union
- Branch/service: Union Army; Illinois Militia
- Years of service: 1862-1865 (Army); 1898 (Militia)
- Rank: Major (Army); Colonel (Militia)
- Unit: 120th Illinois Volunteer Infantry (Army)
- Commands: Wilson's Provisional Regiment (Militia)
- Battles/wars: American Civil War; Spanish–American War

Bluford Wilson (November 30, 1841 – July 15, 1924) was a Union Army officer in the Civil War and a government official who served as Solicitor of the United States Treasury.

== Early life ==
Bluford Wilson was born near Shawneetown, Illinois on November 30, 1841. He studied at McKendree College and the University of Michigan Law School before enlisting for the American Civil War.

== Military career ==
Wilson joined the 120th Illinois Volunteer Infantry. He soon received an officer's commission and appointment as regimental adjutant. He later served on several other staffs, including that of the XIII Corps, taking part in numerous battles and campaigns, including Champion Hill, Black River and the Siege of Vicksburg, and the Red River Campaign. He was discharged with the rank of major at the end of the war.

For the rest of his life Wilson was active in the Grand Army of the Republic and the Military Order of the Loyal Legion of the United States.

== Legal career ==
Wilson resumed studying law at the University of Michigan Law School, graduated in 1866, and was admitted to the bar in 1867.

A Republican, Wilson was appointed United States Attorney for the Southern District of Illinois in 1869.

In 1874 Wilson received appointment as Solicitor of the Treasury, which he held until 1876.

Wilson's rise through the ranks of federal appointed office were based in part on his family's relationship with President Ulysses S. Grant. Bluford Wilson's brother Major General James H. Wilson served on Grant's staff and as one of Grant's subordinate commanders during the Civil War.

As Solicitor Wilson played a key role in exposing the Whiskey Ring. He conducted an investigation into the frauds, reported his findings to his superiors, and attempted through his brother James to warn President Grant. When Grant moved to protect members of his administration and prevent prosecutions, Wilson resigned.

== Later life ==
After leaving government service Wilson settled in Springfield, Illinois, where he practiced law and became involved in the construction and management of several railroads.

During the Spanish–American War Wilson offered his services; the governor authorized him to raise a regiment and he was commissioned a Colonel in the Illinois militia, but the war ended before his regiment could see active service.

== Death and burial ==
Wilson died in Springfield on July 15, 1924. He was buried at Oak Ridge Cemetery in Springfield.

== Family ==
In 1865 Wilson married Alice Warren Mather of Louisville, Kentucky, and they were the parents of five children. Harry died in infancy. Jessie was the wife of Phillip Barton Warren. Lucy was the wife of Ralph Vance Dickerman. Bluford died during his senior year at Yale University. Arthur graduated from West Point in 1904, attained the rank of Colonel during a career that spanned the years 1904 to 1942, and received the Medal of Honor during the Philippine Insurrection.

Legal offices
Preceded by E. C. Banfield	Solicitor of the United States Treasury; 1874–1876	Succeeded by George F. Talbot
