= Gilbert Rodman (born 1748) =

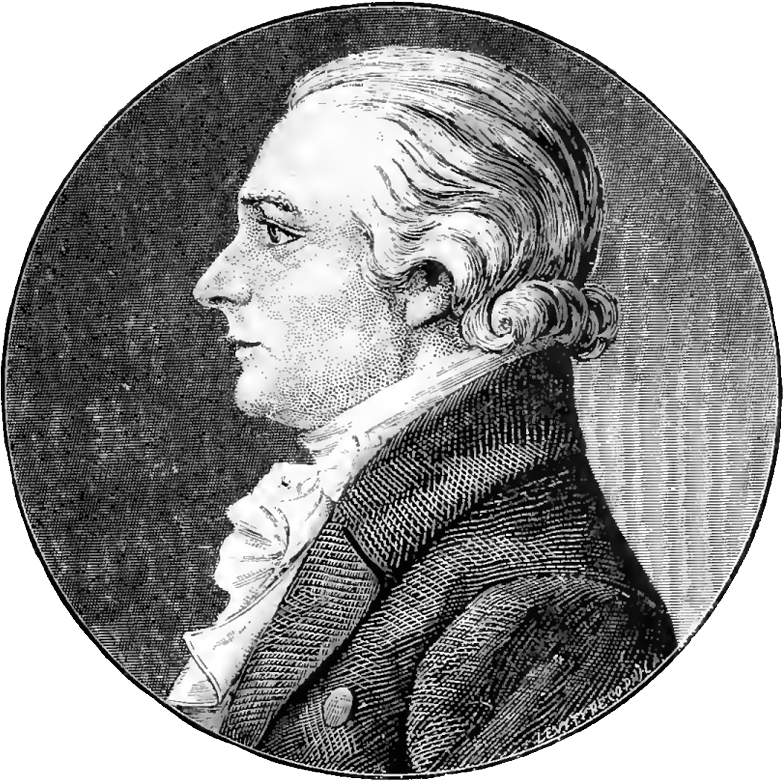
- Portrait of Gilbert Rodman, c. 1800
- Born: July 21, 1748; Bensalem, Pennsylvania
- Died: August 21, 1830 (aged 82); Bensalem, Pennsylvania
- Occupations: Militia officer, landowner
- Known for: Service in the American Revolutionary War
- Spouse: Sarah Gibbs
- Children: 11, including Gilbert Rodman

Gilbert Rodman (July 21, 1748 - August 21, 1830) was a prominent resident of Bucks County, Pennsylvania who served in the American Revolutionary War.

== Biography ==
Gilbert Rodman was born to Quakers William Rodman (May 5, 1720 - January 30, 1794) and Mary Reeve in Bensalem, Pennsylvania on July 21, 1748. Rodman's ancestry was predominantly English whose ancestors settled in Barbados before arriving to the American colonies.

Several members of the Rodman family were active in the Revolutionary War and subsequent establishment of the new country. Gilbert Rodman's father took an oath of fidelity and allegiance to Pennsylvania in 1778. His brother, also named William Rodman, was a brigade quartermaster and elected to the U.S. House of Representatives.

On July 4, 1776, the Middletown, Pennsylvania Meeting of Friends minutes show that members of his church discovered Gilbert Rodman "entered into military Discipline to learn the Art of War." Fellow Quakers attempted to talk him out of violating the Quaker beliefs against war, but he was reported to be unwilling to condemn the war in repeated visits by various church members. Later that fall, the Friends formally disowned him. (It was not his first run-in with the Quaker practices. In 1764, Rodman was described as "a Very Raw youth, greatly ignorant of Religion.")

Gilbert Rodman was selected to serve as Major in the 2nd Battalion of Bucks County Associators during the American Revolution. His service is credited during the Amboy Campaign of 1776. In January 1778, Rodman allowed an encampment of American troops on his land based on a letter to General George Washington from Brigadier General John Lacey Jr.

Gilbert Rodman inherited large property in Warwick, Bucks County, Pennsylvania in addition to an acreage in Virginia. He made his home at Spruce Hill Farm, the 360-acre Warwick property, until 1808 when he sold it to the Bucks County government as a space to build an almshouse for the poor. At that time, Rodman relocated to the Bensalem area, closer to his in-laws and other family until the end of his life.

Rodman was the father to 11 children with wife Sarah Gibbs whom he married on June 3, 1784, at Christ Church in Philadelphia, Pennsylvania. They included Gilbert Rodman, his son who served as acting Solicitor of the United States Treasury.

After his death in 1830, Rodman was buried with his wife and daughter in the Gibbs Burial Ground in Eddington, Pennsylvania. The Gibbs family burial site was eventually vandalized so badly that all stones and evidence were buried. In 2005, members of the Bensalem Historical Society recovered and reassembled the broken headstones, preserving the uncovered pieces in concrete.
