= John Vance =

John Vance may refer to:

- John L. Vance (1839–1921), member of the United States House of Representatives
- John Vance (MP) (died 1875), MP for Dublin City and later MP for Armagh City
- Jack Vance, American fantasy and science fiction author
- John Vance (comics), fictional character from DC Comics
