= 1850 Maine gubernatorial election =

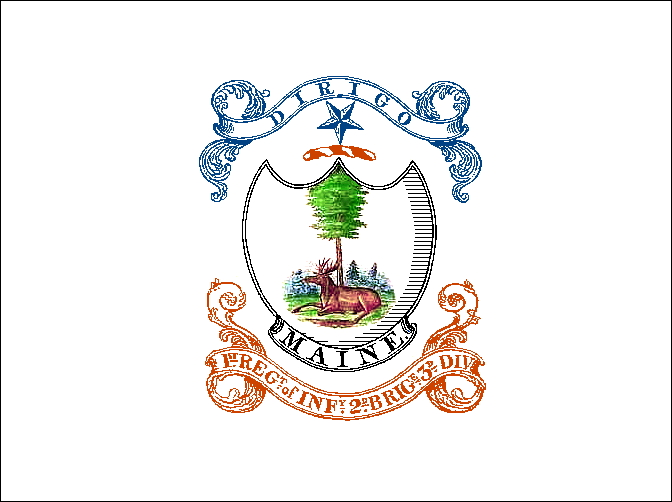
- September 9, 1850
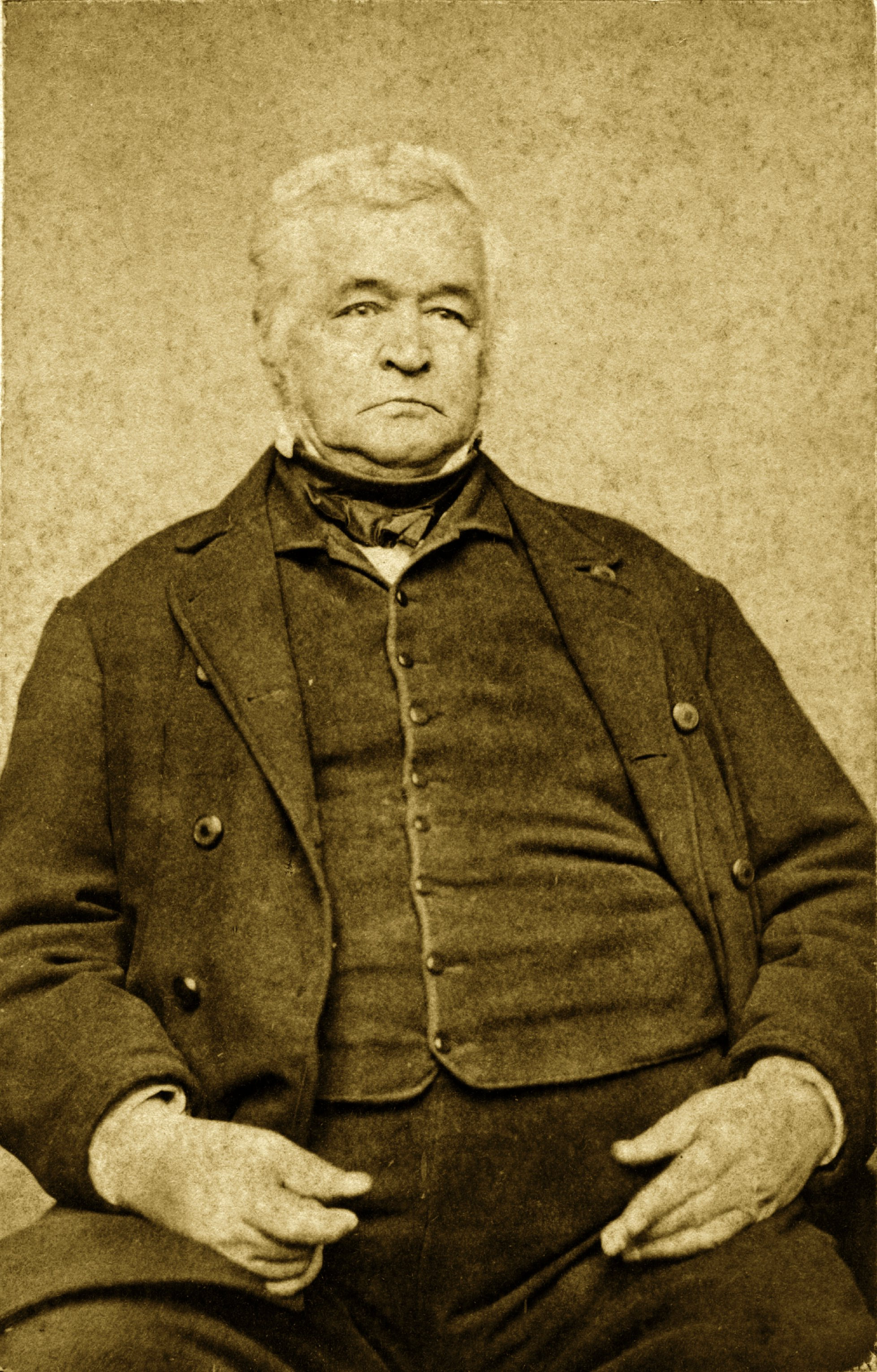

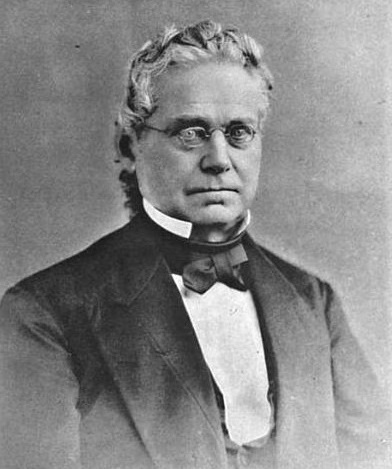

Nominee	John Hubbard	William G. Crosby	George F. Talbot
Party	Democratic	Whig	Free Soil
Popular vote	41,203	32,120	7,267
Percentage	51.08%	39.82%	9.01%
- County results Hubbard: 40–50% 50–60% 60–70% Crosby: 40–50% 50–60%
Governor before election
John Hubbard
Democratic
Elected Governor
John Hubbard
Democratic

The 1850 Maine gubernatorial election was held on September 9, 1850, in order to elect the governor of Maine. Incumbent Democratic governor John Hubbard won re-election against Whig nominee William G. Crosby and Free Soil Party nominee George F. Talbot.

== General election ==
On election day, September 9, 1850, incumbent Democratic governor John Hubbard won re-election by a margin of 9,083 votes against his foremost opponent Whig nominee William G. Crosby, thereby retaining Democratic control over the office of governor. Hubbard was sworn in for his second term on May 8, 1851.

=== Results ===
Maine gubernatorial election, 1850
Party	Candidate	Votes	%
Democratic	John Hubbard (incumbent)	41,203	51.08
Whig	William G. Crosby	32,120	39.82
Free Soil	George F. Talbot	7,267	9.01
	Scattering	75	0.09
Total votes		80,665	100.00
Democratic hold			
