= William T. Thompson (Nebraska politician) =

American politician

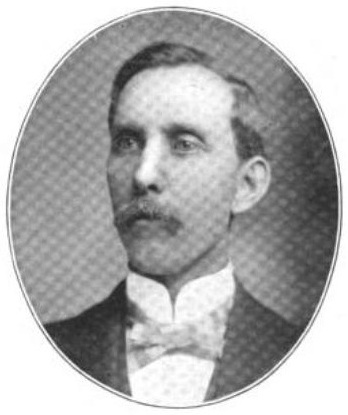

13th Nebraska Attorney General
- In office 1907–1910
- Governor: George L. Sheldon; Ashton Shallenberger
- Preceded by: Norris Brown
- Succeeded by: Arthur F. Mullen

Personal details
- Born: May 23, 1860 Fennimore, Wisconsin, U.S.
- Died: June 20, 1939 (aged 79) Lincoln, Nebraska, U.S.
- Party: Republican

William Townsend Thompson (May 23, 1860 – June 20, 1939) was an American lawyer who served as Nebraska Attorney General and Solicitor of the United States Treasury.

== Biography ==
William Thompson was born near Fennimore, Wisconsin, on May 23, 1860. After being orphaned at age 11 he was raised first by a family friend, and later by an older, married sister in Pottawattamie County, Iowa. At age 19 he began attending Simpson College in Indianola, Iowa, teaching school to pay his tuition, and also studying law.

In 1884 Thompson was admitted to the bar in Des Moines. He practiced for a year in Indianola, and then relocated to Central City, Nebraska.

A Republican, Thompson served a term as Merrick County Attorney (1889 to 1901) before serving two terms in the Nebraska House of Representatives, 1899 to 1901 and 1903 to 1905.

In 1905 he moved to Lincoln and from 1905 to 1907 Thompson served as Nebraska's Deputy Attorney General.

In 1906 Thompson was elected state Attorney General. He served until October, 1910, when he resigned to accept appointment as Solicitor of the Treasury. He served until 1913, when he resigned and returned to Lincoln, and the position was filled by Felix A. Reeve as acting solicitor of the treasury. Thompson continued to practice law in Lincoln.

Thompson died in Lincoln on June 20, 1939.

Legal offices
Preceded by Norris Brown	Attorney General of Nebraska; 1907–1910	Succeeded by Arthur F. Mullen
Preceded by Maurice D. O'Connell	Solicitor of the United States Treasury; 1910–1913	Succeeded by Lawrence Becker
