= 1856 American and Whig National Conventions =

1856 American and Whig National Conventions may refer to:

- 1856 American National Convention, a meeting of the Know Nothing movement in Philadelphia, Pennsylvania, on February 22–25
- 1856 Whig National Convention, a presidential nomination convention in Baltimore, Maryland, on September 17–18
