= Gilbert Rodman =

American lawyer

Gilbert Rodman (August 21, 1800 – January 15, 1862) was a Pennsylvania attorney and government official who served as acting Solicitor of the United States Treasury.

== Biography ==
Gilbert Rodman was born in Bensalem, Pennsylvania on August 21, 1800, to Gilbert Rodman and Sarah Gibbs. He clerked for a Philadelphia merchant, studied law with George M. Dallas and became an attorney, first in Lancaster, and then in Philadelphia.

In 1829 Samuel D. Ingham of Pennsylvania was appointed Secretary of the Treasury and asked Rodman to accompany him. Rodman rose through the ranks of the department to become Chief Clerk, or primary assistant to the Secretary, serving until his death.

Rodman occasionally acted as Solicitor of the Treasury and Secretary of the Treasury during the absences of the primary office holders or when there were interregnums.

During the Zachary Taylor administration Rodman was sent to San Francisco to investigate irregularities in the collections of customs duties.

Rodman died in Washington, D.C. on January 15, 1862.

Legal offices
Preceded by George F. Comstock	Solicitor of the United States Treasury; 1853–1853	Succeeded by John Carroll LeGrand
