= Norris Brown =

American politician

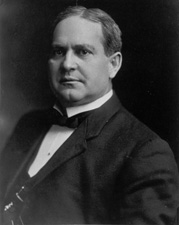

United States Senator from Nebraska
- In office March 4, 1907 – March 3, 1913
- Preceded by: Joseph Millard
- Succeeded by: George W. Norris

12th Attorney General of Nebraska
- In office 1905–1907
- Governor: John H. Mickey
- Preceded by: Frank N. Prout
- Succeeded by: William T. Thompson

Personal details
- Born: May 2, 1863 Maquoketa, Iowa, U.S.
- Died: January 5, 1960 (aged 96) Seattle, Washington, U.S.
- Party: Republican

Norris Brown (May 2, 1863 – January 5, 1960) was a Senator from Nebraska.

Brown was born in Maquoketa, Iowa. The son of William Henry Harrison and Eliza Ann Phelps Brown, he attended Jefferson Iowa Academy and graduated with a law degree from the University of Iowa College of Law in Iowa City, Iowa, in 1883. He was admitted to the bar in 1884 and commenced his law practice in Perry, Iowa. He moved to Kearney, Nebraska, in 1888 and continued the practice of law. Brown was the prosecuting attorney of Buffalo County from 1892 to 1896, the deputy attorney general of Nebraska from 1900 to 1905, and the attorney general of Nebraska from 1905 to 1907. He distinguished himself in this post by winning a tax suit of over a million dollars against the railroads. The money was used to open schools in Nebraska.

Brown was elected as a Republican to the United States Senate and served from March 4, 1907, to March 3, 1913. During his term he served as the chairman of the Committee on Patents (Sixty-first and Sixty-second Congresses). He proposed permitting an income tax, later incorporated into the Sixteenth Amendment of the U.S. Constitution. He was an unsuccessful candidate for renomination in 1912. He then resumed the practice of law in Omaha where he became senior partner in the firm of Brown, Crossman, West, Barton, and Quinlan. He served as attorney for the Omaha Stockyards for 30 years.

In 1942, he retired and moved to Seattle, Washington. Brown died there January 5, 1960, and was interred in Forest Lawn Cemetery in Omaha.

Brown was married twice. In 1885, he married Lula K. Beeler, who died in 1925. They had two daughters. Ann L. Howland became his second wife in 1927. She died in 1937.

Legal offices
| Preceded by Frank N. Prout | Attorney General of Nebraska; 1905–1907 | Succeeded by William T. Thompson |
U.S. Senate
| Preceded by Joseph Millard | U.S. senator (Class 2) from Nebraska; 1907–1913; Served alongside: Elmer Burkett, Gilbert Hitchcock | Succeeded by George W. Norris |
Honorary titles
| Preceded by Charles Dick | Most senior living U.S. senator (Sitting or former); March 13, 1945 – January 5, 1960 | Succeeded by Henry Ashurst |
