= Lawrence Becker =

American lawyer and Treasury official (1869–1947)

Lawrence Becker (August 10, 1869 – March 12, 1947) was an Indiana lawyer and judge who served as Solicitor of the United States Treasury.

== Biography ==
Lawrence Becker was born on August 10, 1869, in Finnentrop, Germany, and when he was 10 years old his family emigrated to the United States. Becker was raised in Tolleston, Indiana, and Montana before attending law school at Valparaiso University, from which he graduated in 1896.

A Democrat, Becker established a law practice in Hammond, Indiana. From 1898 to 1902 he served as city attorney and he was mayor from 1904 to 1911.

Becker resigned as mayor to accept appointment as Judge of the Superior Court in Lake County, where he served until 1914.

In 1915 Becker was appointed Solicitor of the Treasury, and he held this office until 1922, when he accepted a position in the Internal Revenue Service.

In 1934 Becker was again elected a judge of the Superior Court in Indiana, and he served until being defeated for renomination in 1946.

Becker died in East Chicago, Indiana, on March 12, 1947. He was buried at Oak Hill Cemetery in Hammond.

Legal offices
Preceded by William T. Thompson	Solicitor of the United States Treasury; 1915–1922	Succeeded by Richard Randolph McMahon
