= Arthur H. Wilson =

Arthur Harrison Wilson
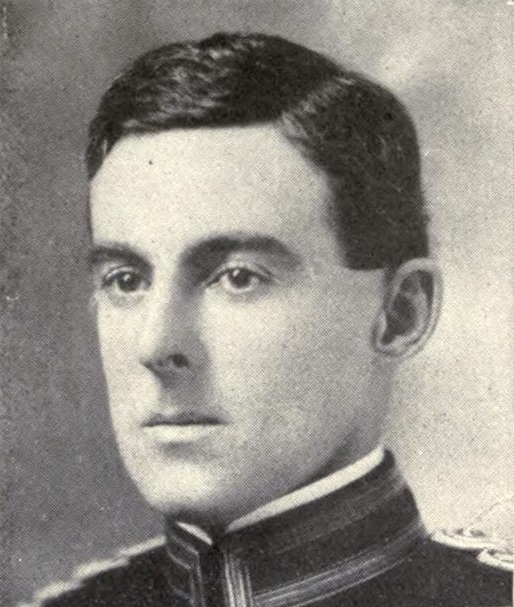
- Arthur Harrison Wilson, Medal of Honor recipient
- Born: August 17, 1881; Springfield, Illinois
- Died: December 15, 1953 (aged 72); Brownsville, Texas
- Burial place: Oak Ridge Cemetery, Springfield, Illinois
- Relatives: Bluford Wilson (father); James H. Wilson (uncle)
- Military career
- Allegiance: United States of America
- Branch: United States Army
- Service years: 1904 - 1942
- Rank: Colonel
- Nickname: "Jingle"
- Unit: 6th U.S. Cavalry
- Conflicts: Philippine Insurrection
- Awards: Medal of Honor

Arthur Harrison Wilson (1881–1953) was an officer in the United States Army and a Medal of Honor recipient for his actions in the Philippine Insurrection. Originally a member of the West Point class of 1903, he was held back a year and graduated in 1904. He was the captain of the world champion West Point Polo Team, and served a long career in the Cavalry. He was a full colonel and commander of Fort Brown, Texas, when he retired in 1942 after almost 40 years service. He lived the remaining 11 years of his life in retirement at Brownsville, Texas. He died of cardiac failure while duck hunting, one of his favorite sports.

== Medal of Honor citation ==
Rank and organization: Second Lieutenant, 6th U.S. Cavalry. Place and date: At Patian Island, Philippine Islands, July 4, 1909. Entered service at: Springfield, Ill. Birth: Springfield, Ill. Date of issue: Unknown.

Citation:

While in action against hostile Moros, when, it being necessary to secure a mountain gun in position by rope and tackle, voluntarily with the assistance of an enlisted man, carried the rope forward and fastened it, being all the time under heavy fire of the enemy at short range.

== See also ==
- List of Philippine–American War Medal of Honor recipients
