= 1856 American National Convention =

American political convention

- 1856 presidential election
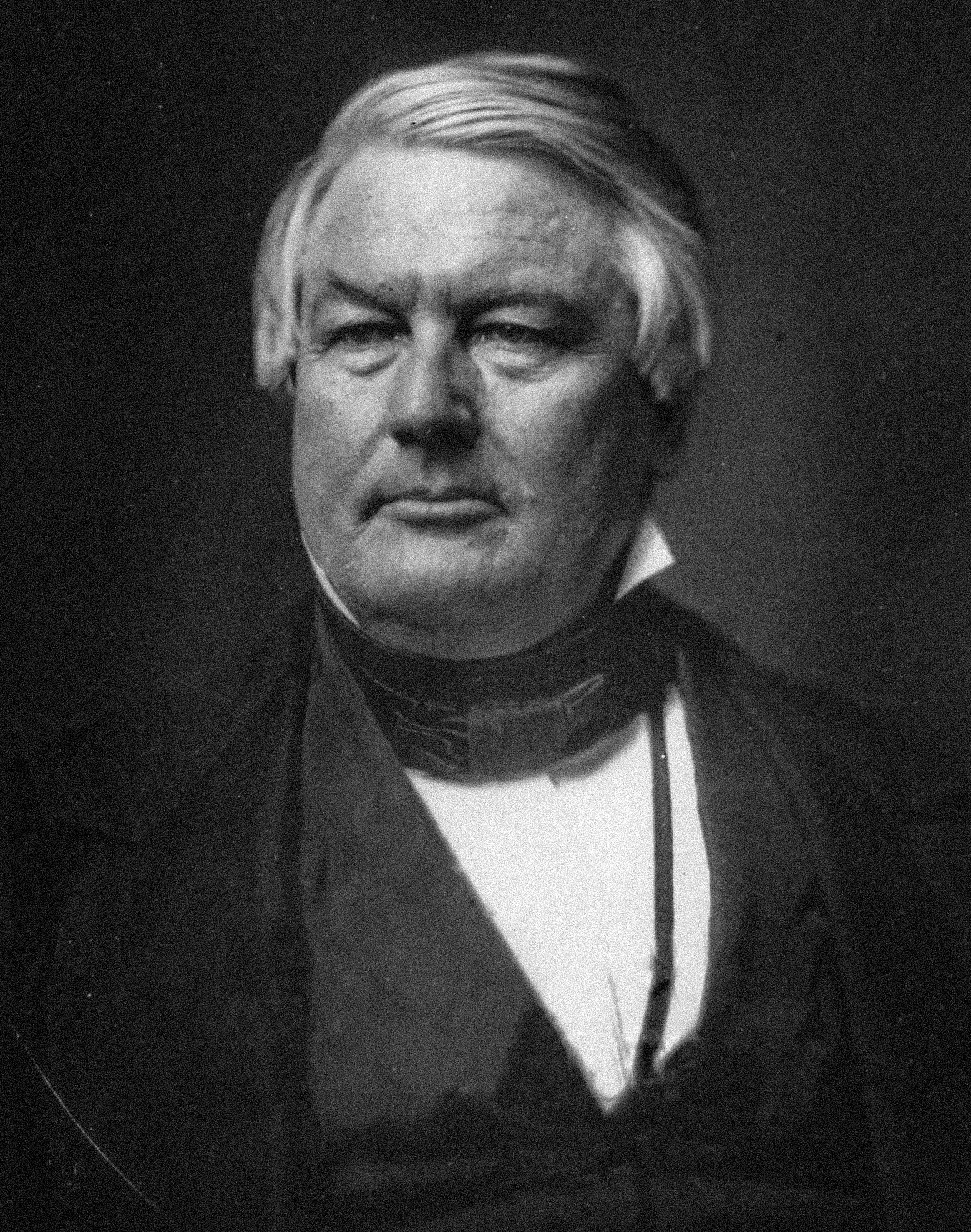
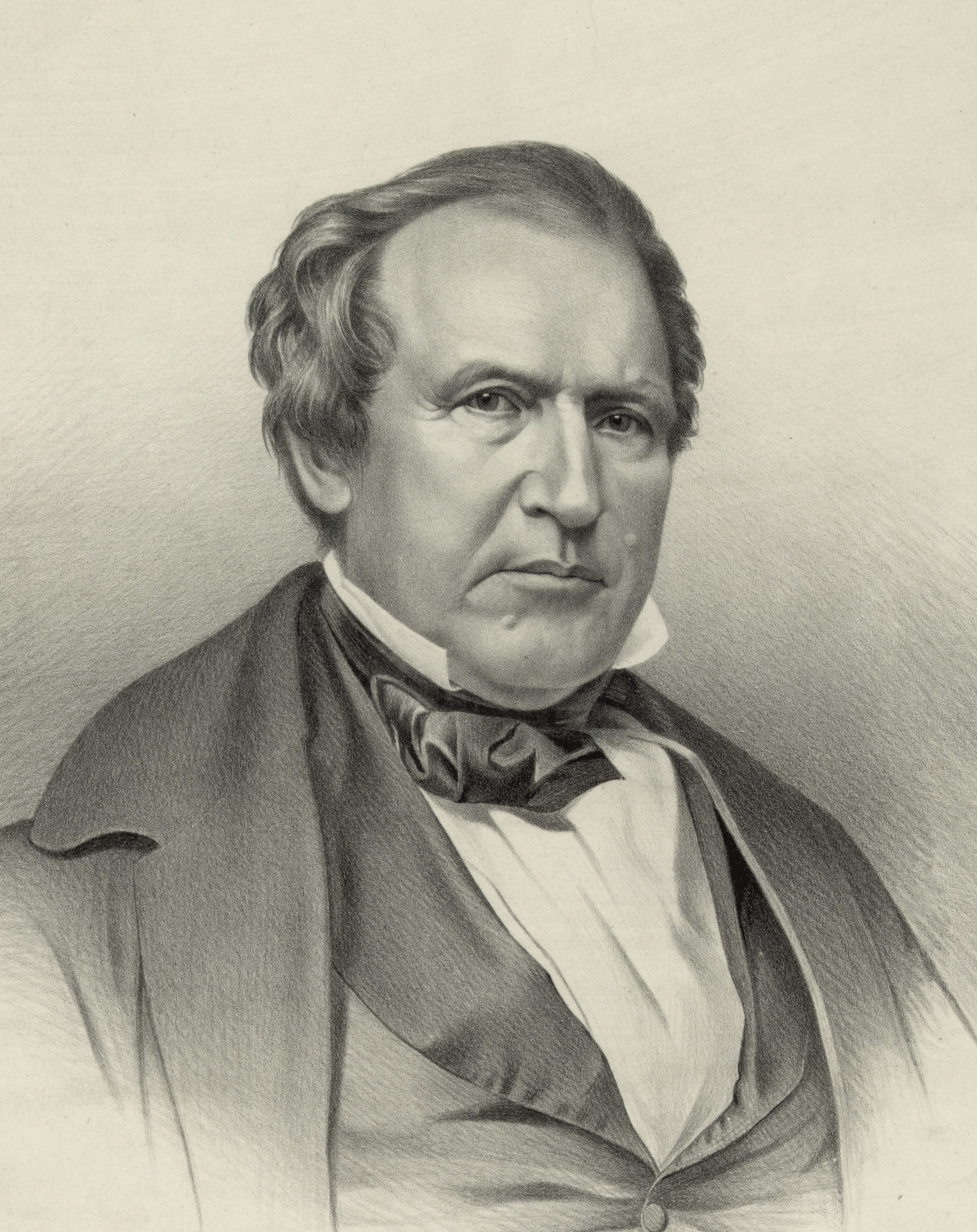
- Nominees; Fillmore and Donelson

Convention
- Dates: February 22–25, 1856
- City: Philadelphia, Pennsylvania
- Venue: National Hall

Candidates
- Presidential nominee: Millard Fillmore of New York
- Vice-presidential nominee: Andrew J. Donelson of Tennessee

The 1856 American National Convention was held in National Hall in Philadelphia, Pennsylvania, on February 22 to 25, 1856. The American Party, formerly the Native American Party, was the vehicle of the Know Nothing movement. The convention resulted in the nomination of former President Millard Fillmore from New York for president and former Ambassador Andrew Jackson Donelson from Tennessee for vice president.

== Background ==
The American Party absorbed most of the former Whig Party in 1854, and by 1855 it had established itself as the chief opposition party to the Democrats. In the 82 races for the House of Representatives in 1854, the American Party ran 76 candidates, 35 of whom won. None of the six Independents or Whigs who ran in these races was elected. The party then succeeded in electing Nathaniel P. Banks as Speaker of the House in the 34th Congress.

== Logistics ==
The convention was held in National Hall.

== Missouri Compromise Line Resolution ==
Following the decision by party leaders in 1855 not to press the slavery issue, the convention had to decide how to deal with the Ohio chapter of the party, which was vocally anti-slavery. The convention closed the Ohio chapter and re-opened it under more moderate leadership. Delegates from Ohio, Pennsylvania, Illinois, Iowa, New England, and other Northern states bolted when a resolution declaring that no candidate that opposed prohibiting slavery north of the 36'30' parallel would be granted the nomination was voted down. This removed a greater part of the American Party's support in the North outside of New York, where the conservative faction of the Whig Party remained faithful.

== Presidential nomination ==
=== Presidential candidates ===
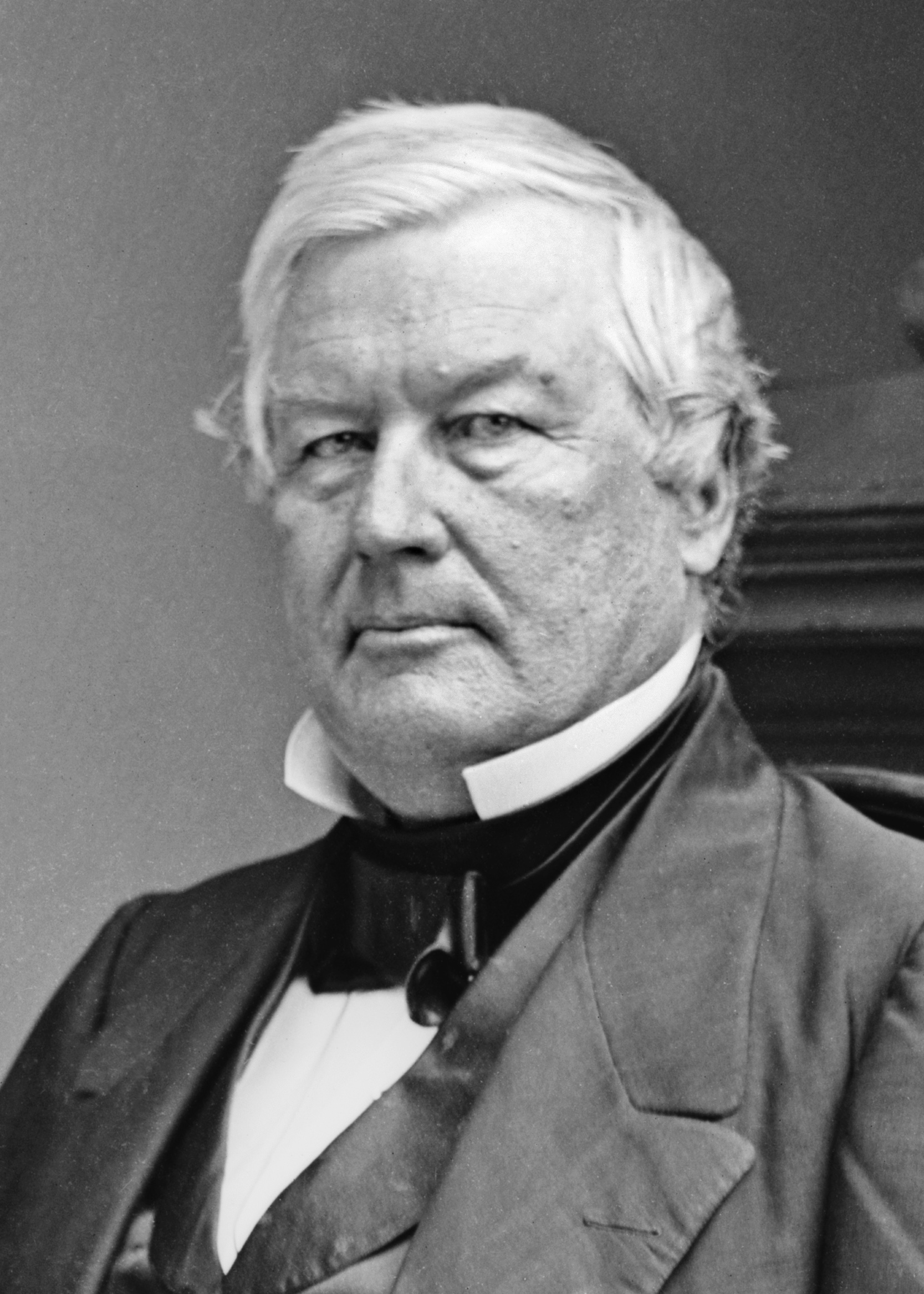
Former President
Millard Fillmore
of New York

Steamboat Entrepreneur
George Law
of New York

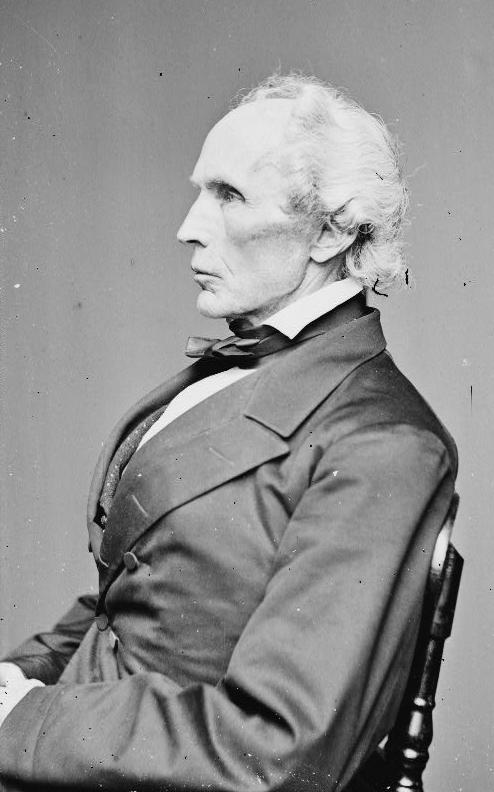
Former Representative
Garrett Davis
of Kentucky

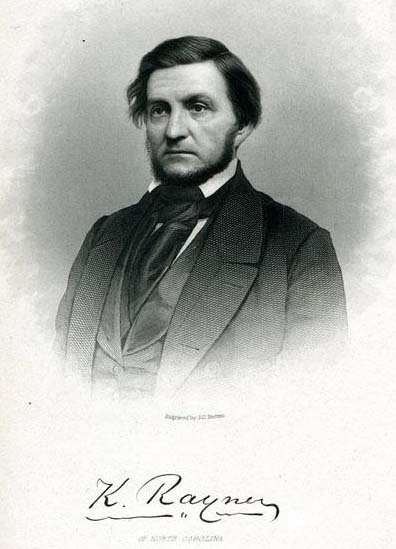
Former Representative
Kenneth Rayner
of North Carolina

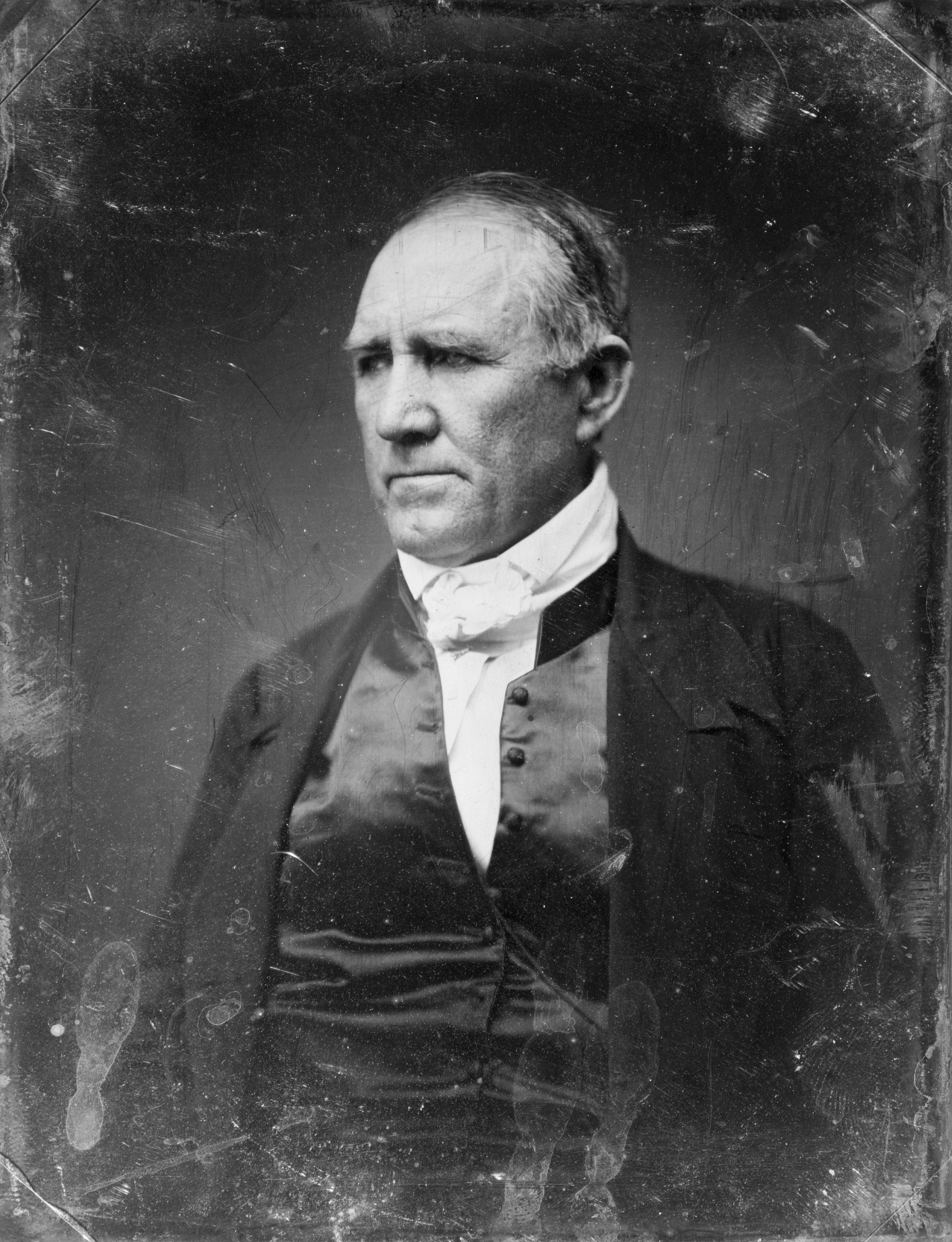
Senator
Sam Houston
of Texas
(Disavowed Conventions)

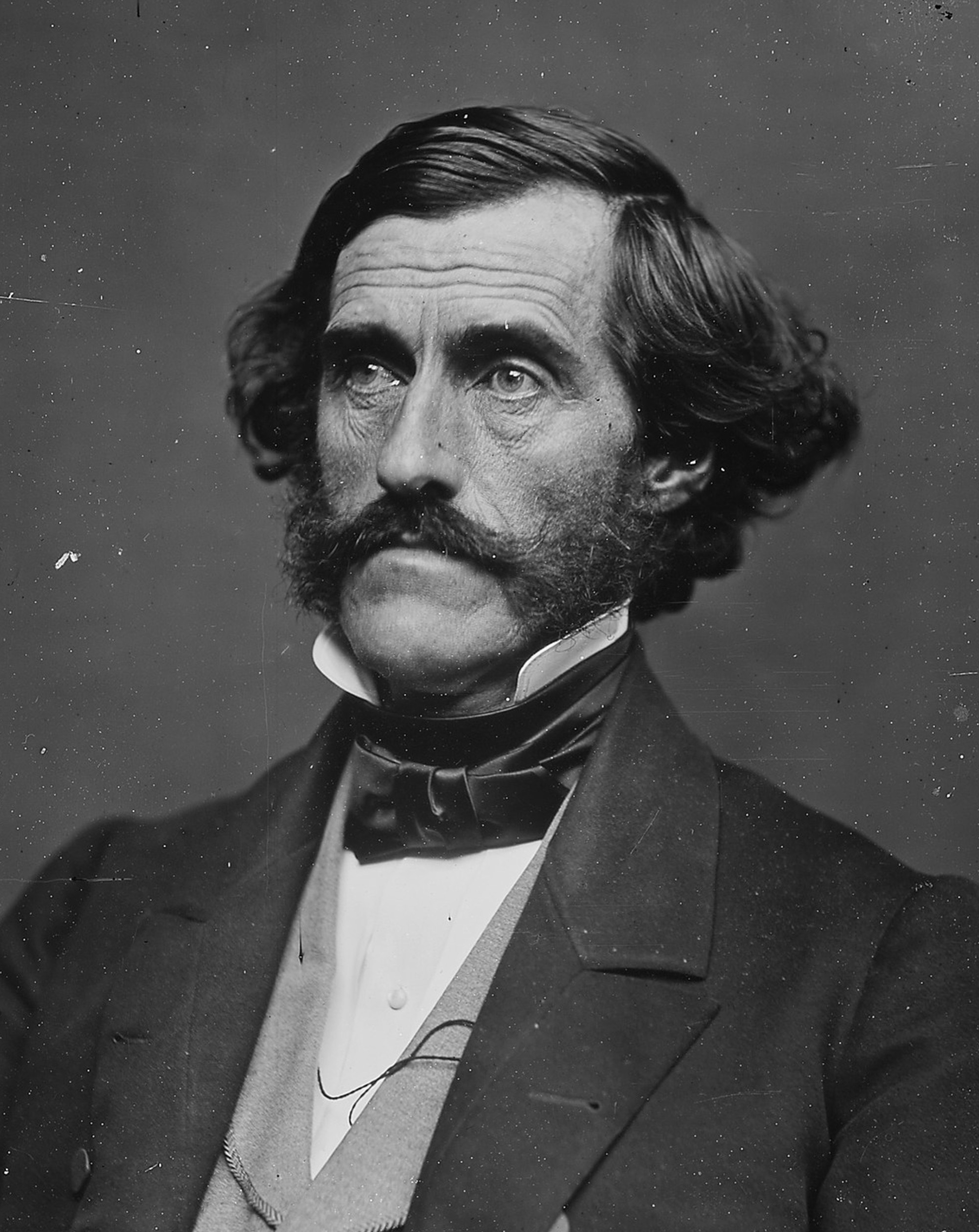
Former Senator
Robert F. Stockton
of New Jersey

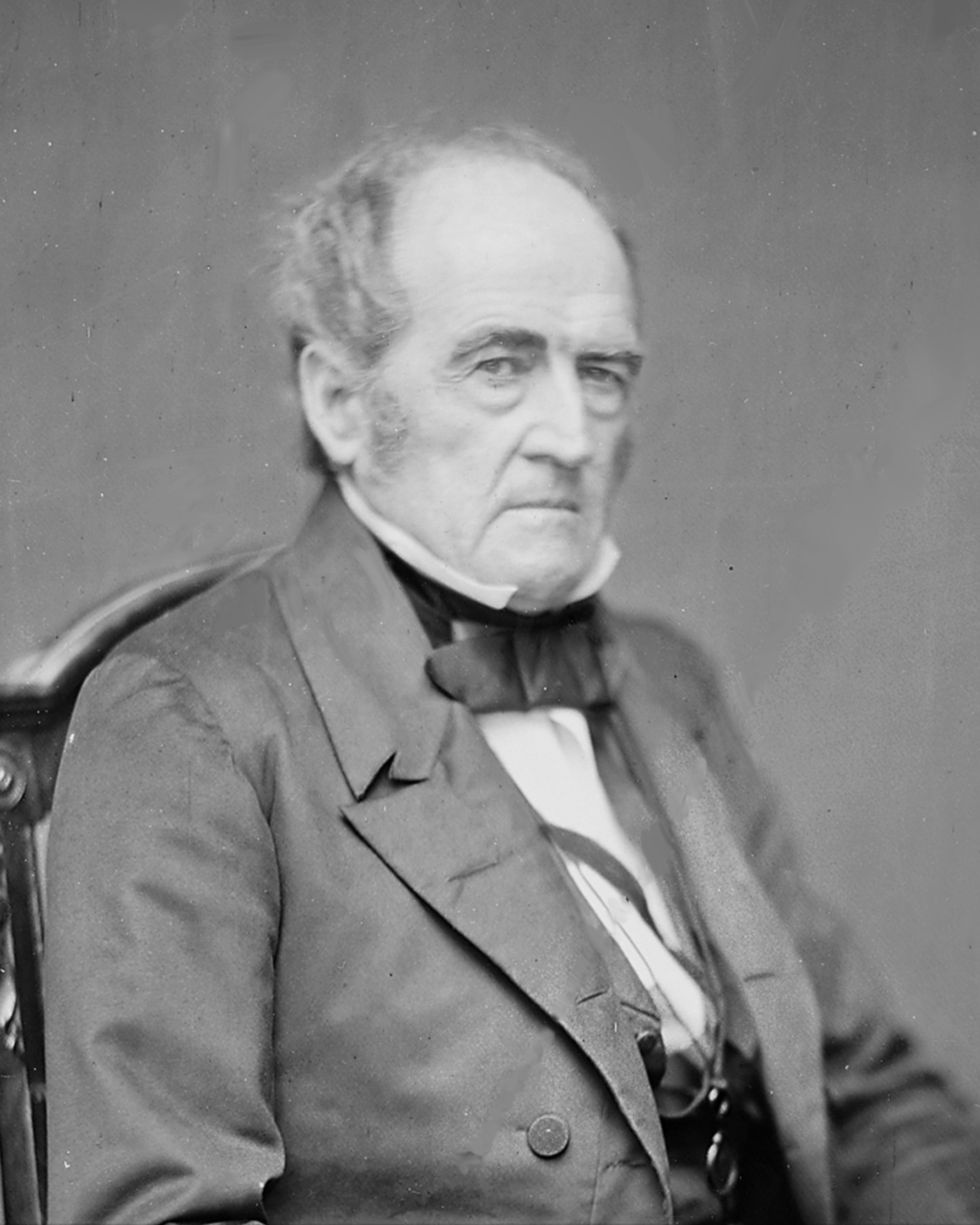
Senator
John Bell
of Tennessee

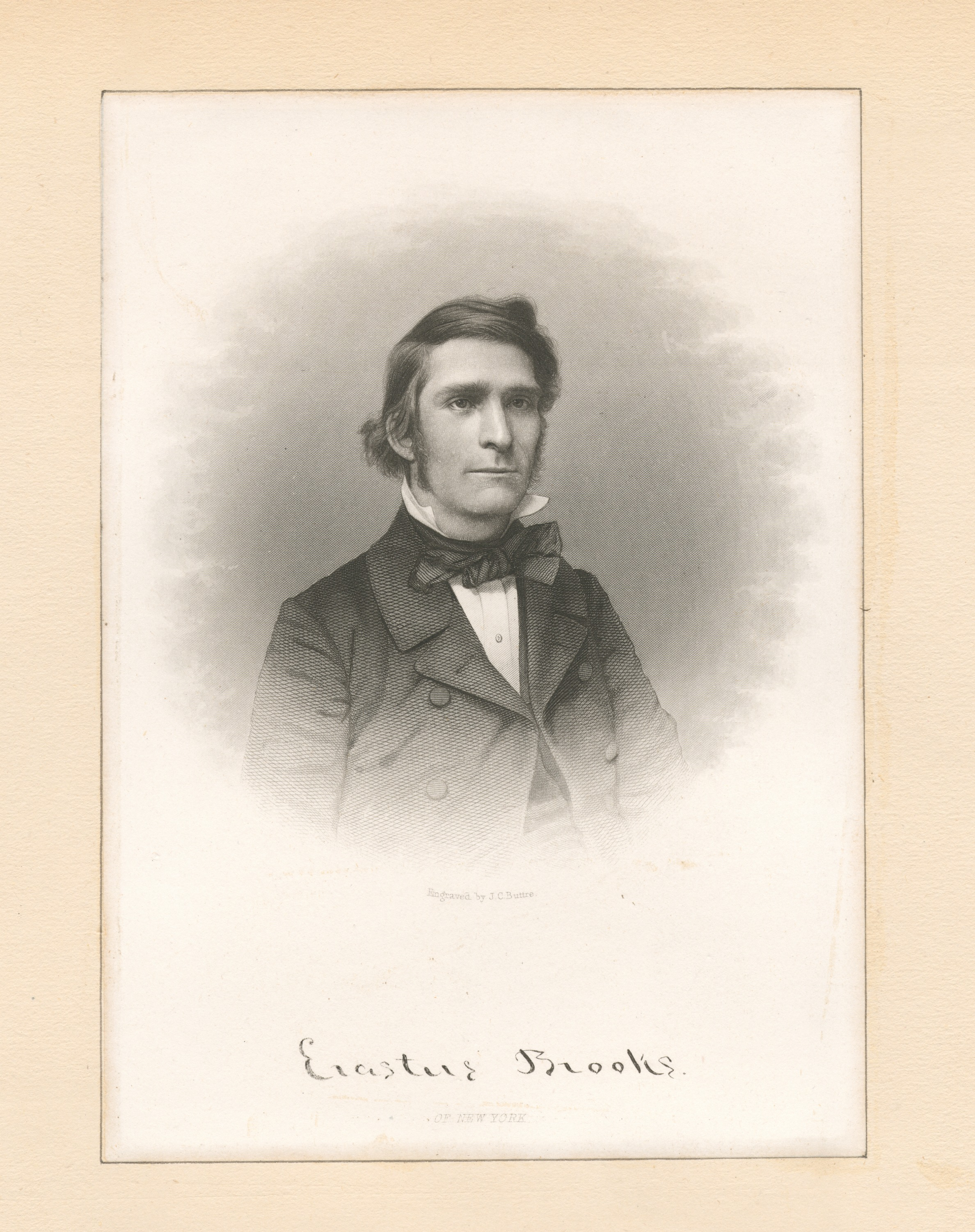
State Senator
Erastus Brooks
of New York

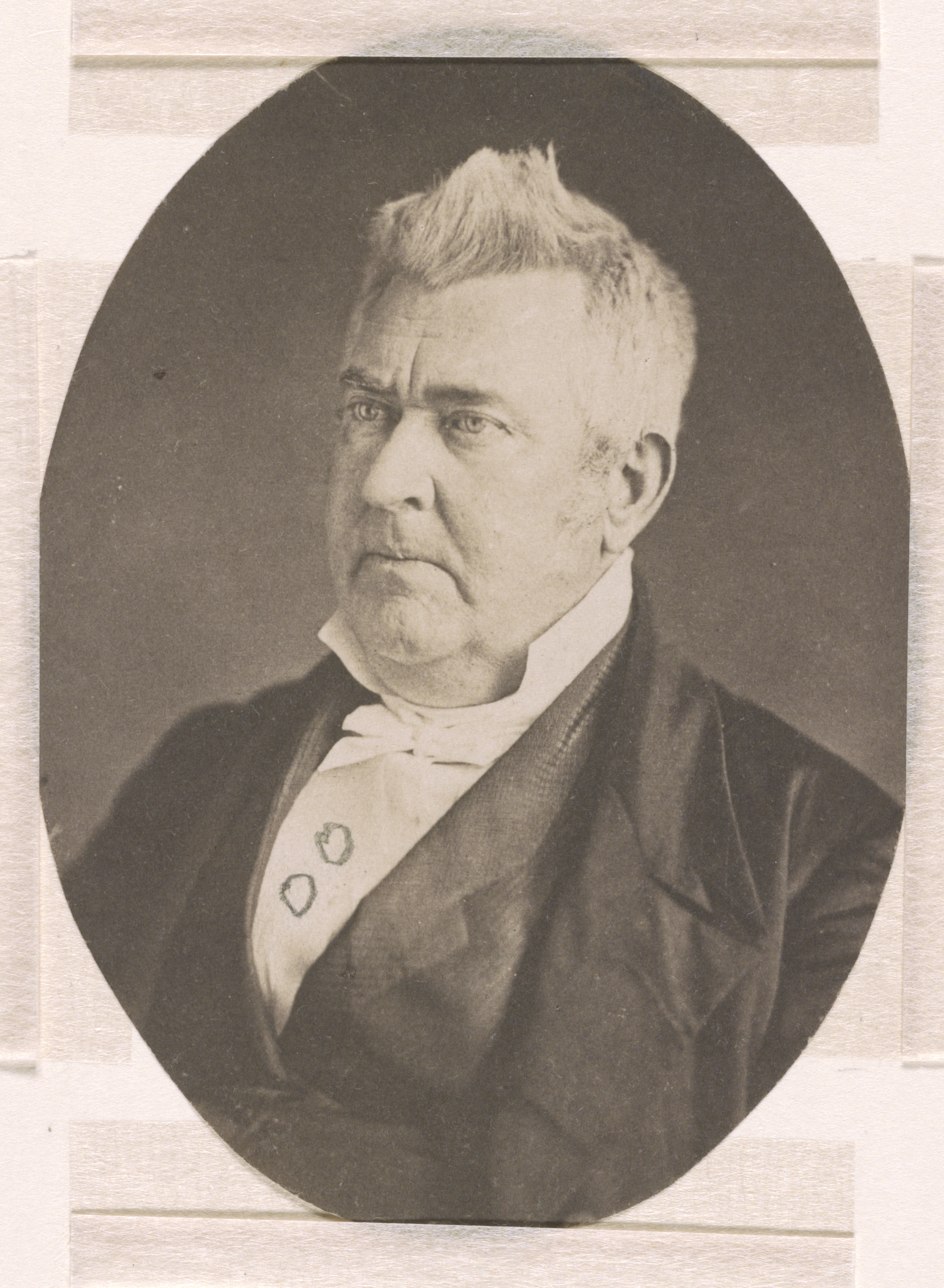
Senator
John M. Clayton
of Delaware
(Withdrawn after
Informal Vote)

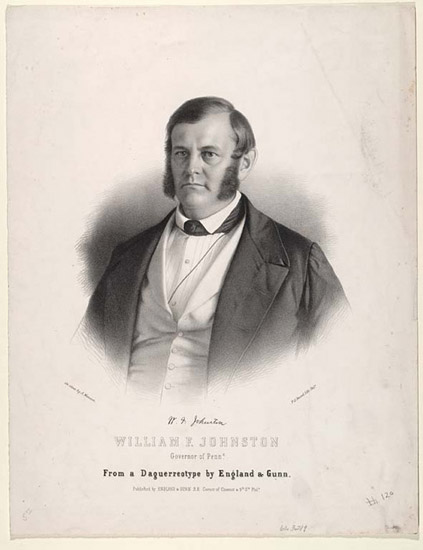
Former Governor
William F. Johnston
of Pennsylvania
(Declined during
Informal Vote)

After the most intense excitement had prevailed, the Convention agreed to a motion of Mr. Ely to proceed to an informal vote for nomination. Former Governor Johnston received 14 votes, but before the vote was closed he announced that he was not a candidate, whereupon several members changed their votes for other parties. The result of the informal ballot placed Fillmore in first place with 71 votes. Mr. Norris of Delaware withdrew the name of Senator Clayton and said his state was now united for Fillmore.

The vote for president was then proceeded with, the name of each member being called, each state being entitled to its vote in the Electoral College, the absentees, to be voted for proportionately by the votes cast; no state not represented to be entitled to vote. The unofficial first ballot saw Fillmore increase his strength to 114 votes. It was at this point that various delegates changed their votes to Fillmore. The official first ballot saw former President Millard Fillmore nominated for president with 179 votes out of the 242 votes cast.

Mr. Scraggs, the delegate from New York who had placed Law in nomination, moved that Fillmore be declared the unanimous choice of the Convention. The motion being put, it was carried by a tremendous shout of ayes.

Presidential Ballot
Ballot	Informal (After Shifts)	1st (Before Shifts)	1st (After Shifts)
Fillmore	71	114	179
Law	33	40	23
Davis	13	23	10
McLean	7	16	13
Rayner	2	7	14
Houston	6	7	3
Stockton	3	6	0
Bell	5	0	0
Johnston	3	0	0
Brooks	1	0	0
Campbell	1	0	0
Clayton	1	0	0
Not Represented	31	31	31
Not Voting	119	52	23

Presidential Balloting / 3rd Day of Convention (February 25, 1856)

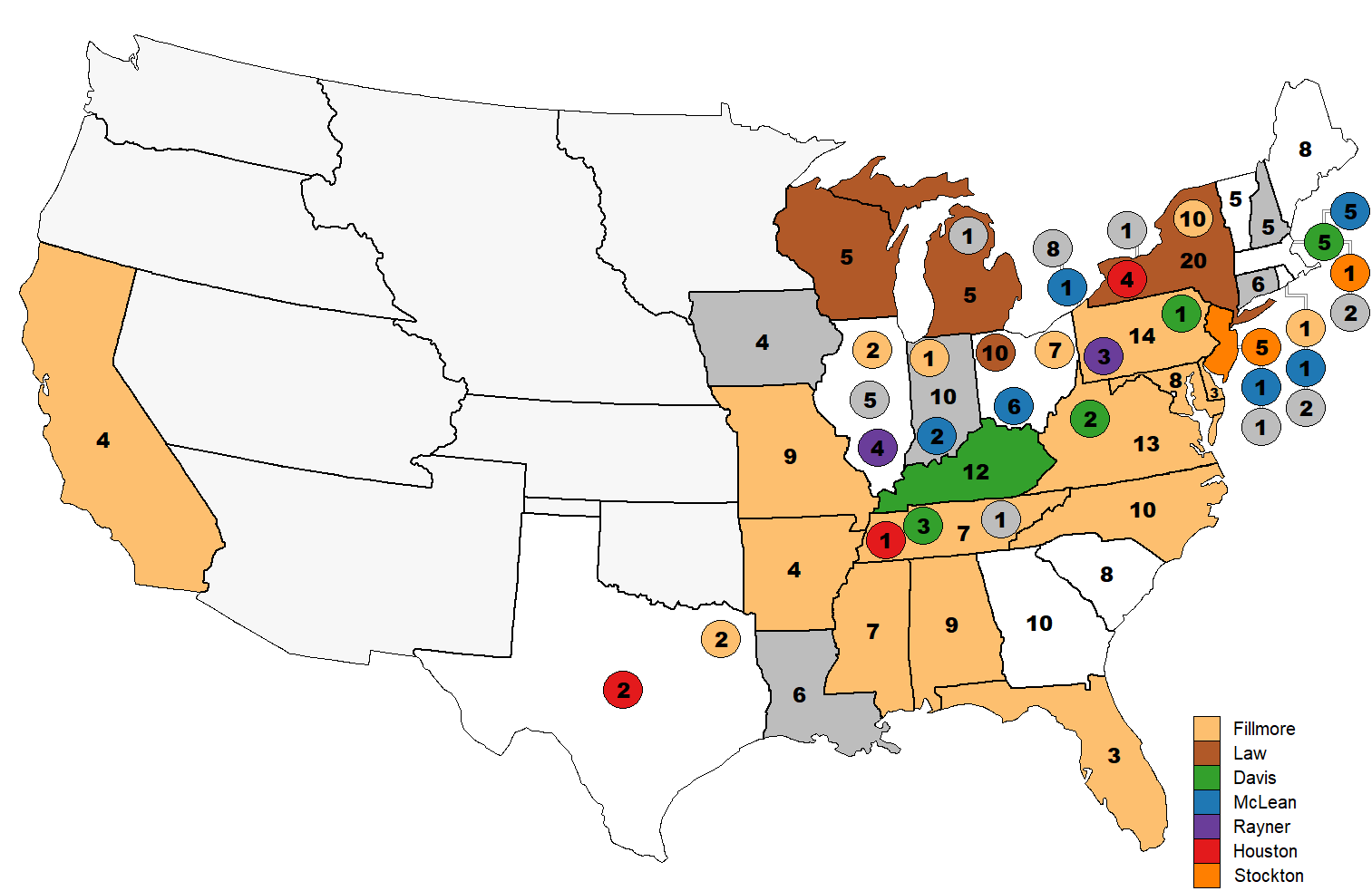
1st Presidential Ballot
(Before Shifts)

== Vice Presidential nomination ==
=== Vice Presidential candidates ===
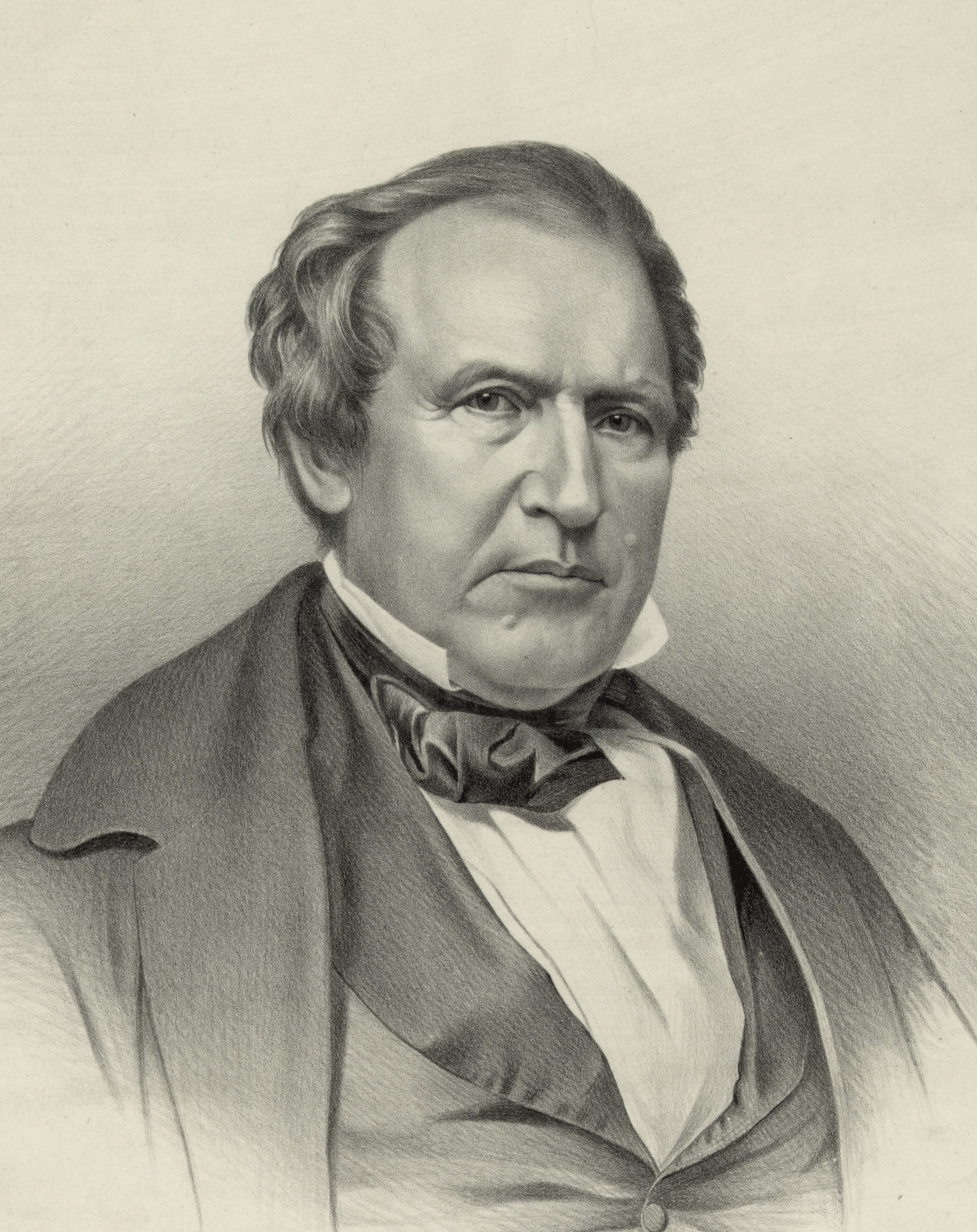
Former Ambassador
Andrew J. Donelson
of Tennessee

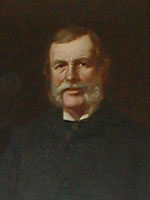
Governor
Henry Gardner
of Massachusetts
(Not Nominated)

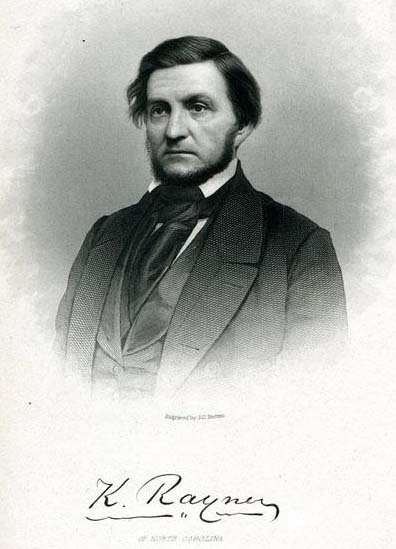
Former Representative
Kenneth Rayner
of North Carolina

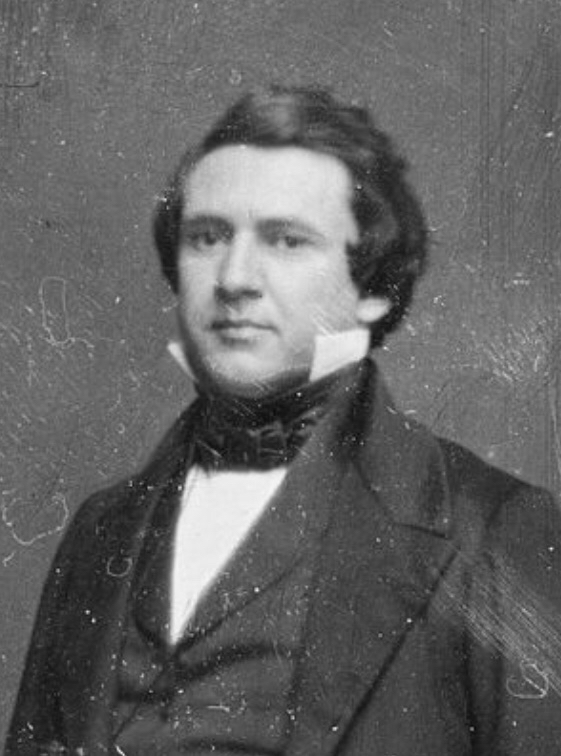
Former Interior Secretary
Alexander Stuart
of Virginia
(Not Nominated)

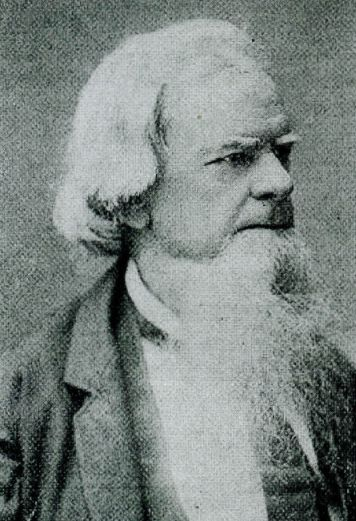
Representative
William R. Smith
of Alabama
(Not Nominated)

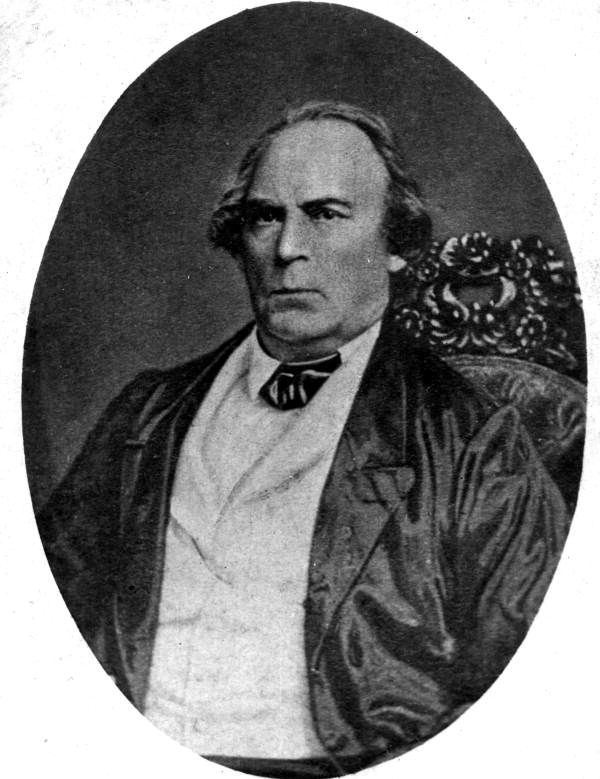
Former Governor
Richard K. Call
of Florida
(Declined)
(Nominated Donelson)

In a nominating speech which praised him as a man of truth, courage and ability, General Call was put before the Convention as a vice presidential candidate. But the former territorial governor declined the honor and begged to be permitted to present one more acceptable. He proposed the name of Andrew Jackson Donelson and it was received with immense applause. Former Representative Rayner of North Carolina and Representative Percy Walker of Alabama were also placed in nomination.

The Convention then proceeded to ballot for a candidate for vice president. The ballot for a candidate for the vice presidency was attended with much excitement and frequent changes of votes created difficulty in making a correct record. In addition to the names placed in nomination, the following individuals received votes: William R. Smith of Alabama, Alexander Stuart of Virginia and Henry Gardner of Massachusetts. But after the vote had been called, delegates from various states arose and changed their votes in favor of Donelson.

Mr. Donelson, having received a majority of the votes for the vice presidency, was declared duly nominated for that position. On motion, and amid much applause, the nomination was made unanimous.

Vice Presidential Ballot
Ballot	1st (After Shifts)
Donelson	181
Gardner	12
Rayner	8
Walker	8
Stuart	2
Not Represented	31
Not Voting	54

== North American Seceders Party nomination ==
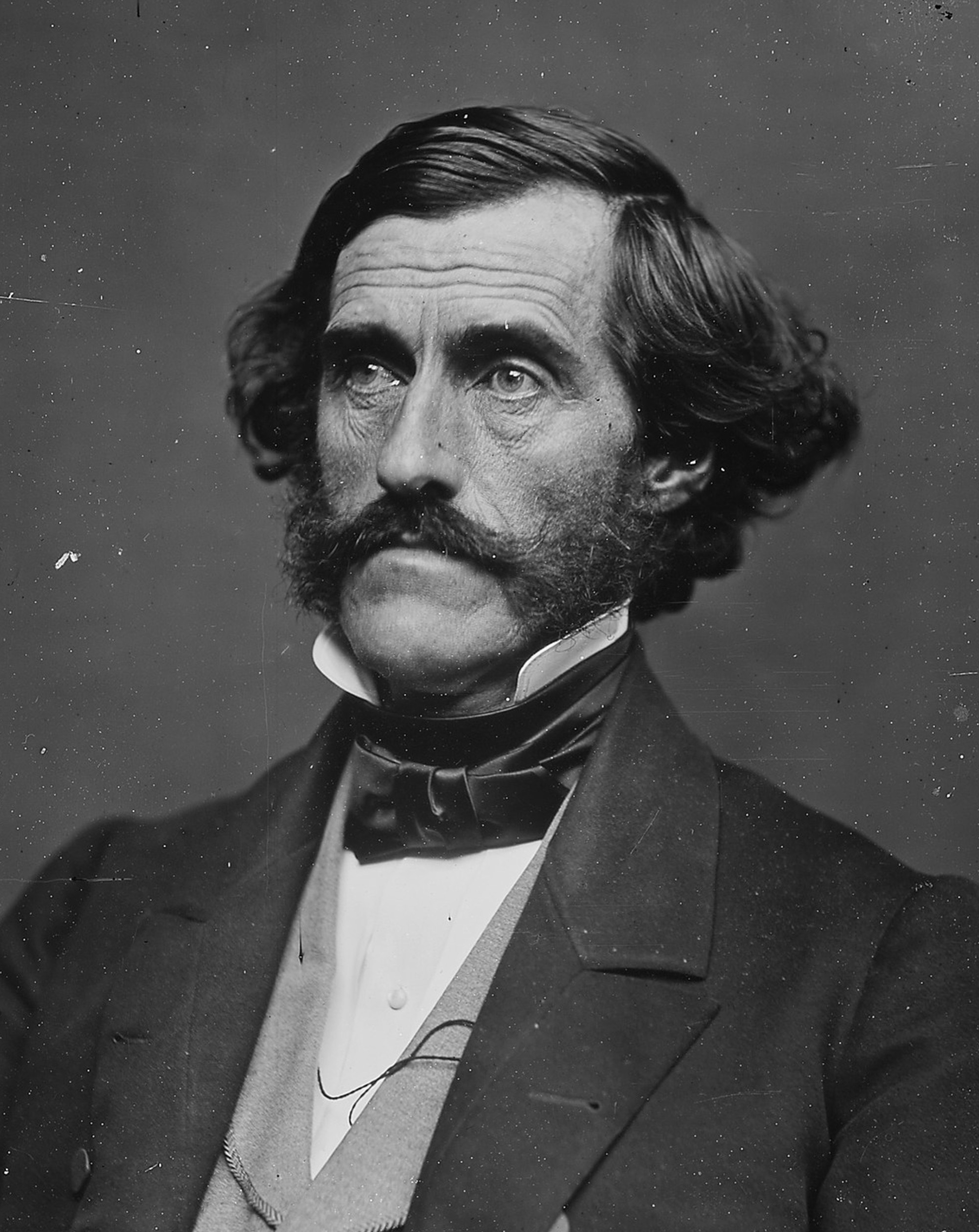
Former Senator
Robert F. Stockton
of New Jersey
(Withdrew)
(Endorsed Fillmore)

A group of North American delegates called the North American Seceders withdrew from the convention and met separately. They objected to the attempt to work with the Republican Party. The Seceders held their own national convention on 6/16-17/1856. 19 delegates unanimously nominated Robert F. Stockton for president and Kenneth Rayner for vice-president. The Seceders' ticket later withdrew from the contest, with Stockton endorsing Millard Fillmore for the Presidency.
