= Henry S. Neal =

American politician

Henry Safford Neal
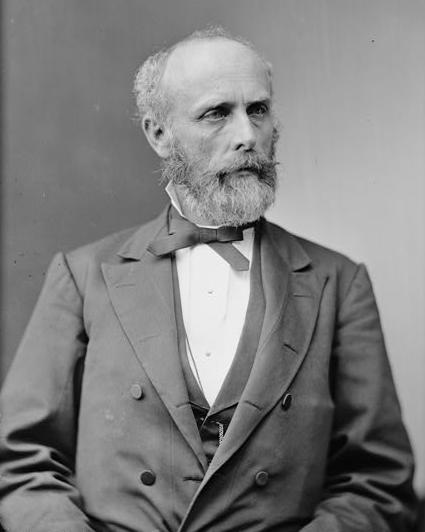

Member of the U.S. House of Representatives from Ohio
- In office March 4, 1877 – March 3, 1883
- Preceded by: John L. Vance
- Succeeded by: John W. McCormick
- Constituency: 11th district (1877-1879); 12th district (1879-1881); 11th district (1881-1883)

Member of the Ohio Senate from the 8th district
- In office January 6, 1862 – December 31, 1865
- Preceded by: T. R. Stanley
- Succeeded by: James Bradbury

20th Solicitor of the United States Treasury
- In office July 3, 1884 – April 13, 1885
- Preceded by: Kenneth Rayner
- Succeeded by: Alexander McCue

Personal details
- Born: August 25, 1828 Gallipolis, Ohio, U.S.
- Died: July 13, 1906 (aged 77) Ironton, Ohio, U.S.
- Resting place: Woodland Cemetery, Ironton
- Party: Republican
- Education: Marietta College

Henry Safford Neal (August 25, 1828 – July 13, 1906) was an American lawyer and politician who served two terms as a U.S. representative from Ohio from 1877 to 1883.

== Biography ==
Born in Gallipolis, Ohio, Neal attended the common schools. He was graduated from Marietta College (Ohio) in 1847. He studied law. He was admitted to the bar in approximately 1851 and commenced practice in Ironton, Ohio. He served as prosecuting attorney of Lawrence County about 1851. He served as member of the State senate from 1861 to 1863. He was appointed consul to Lisbon, Portugal, in 1869. By the resignation of the Minister Resident, he became Chargé d'Affaires in December 1869 and served until July 1870, when he resigned and returned to Ohio. He served as delegate to the Ohio constitutional convention in 1873.

=== Congress ===
Neal was elected as a Republican to the Forty-fifth, Forty-sixth, and Forty-seventh Congresses (March 4, 1877 – March 3, 1883). He served as chairman of the Committee on District of Columbia (Forty-seventh Congress). He was not a candidate for renomination in 1882.

=== Later career ===
He resumed the practice of his profession at Ironton, Ohio. He was appointed Solicitor of the Treasury by President Arthur and served from July 3, 1884, to April 13, 1885, when a successor was appointed by President Cleveland.

He again resumed the practice of law.

=== Death ===
He died in Ironton, Ohio, July 13, 1906. He was interred in Woodland Cemetery.

== Sources ==
- United States Congress. "Henry S. Neal (id: N000012)". Biographical Directory of the United States Congress.

U.S. House of Representatives
Preceded by John L. Vance	Member of the U.S. House of Representatives from Ohio's 11th congressional district March 4, 1877-March 3, 1879	Succeeded by Henry L. Dickey
Preceded by Thomas Ewing, Jr.	Member of the U.S. House of Representatives from Ohio's 12th congressional district March 4, 1879-March 3, 1881	Succeeded by George L. Converse
Preceded by Henry L. Dickey	Member of the U.S. House of Representatives from Ohio's 11th congressional district March 4, 1881-March 3, 1883	Succeeded by John W. McCormick
Legal offices
Preceded by Kenneth Rayner	Solicitor of the United States Treasury; 1884–1885	Succeeded by Alexander McCue
