= National Hall (Philadelphia) =

Former venue in Philadelphia, PA, US

Coordinates: 39.952°N 75.161°W

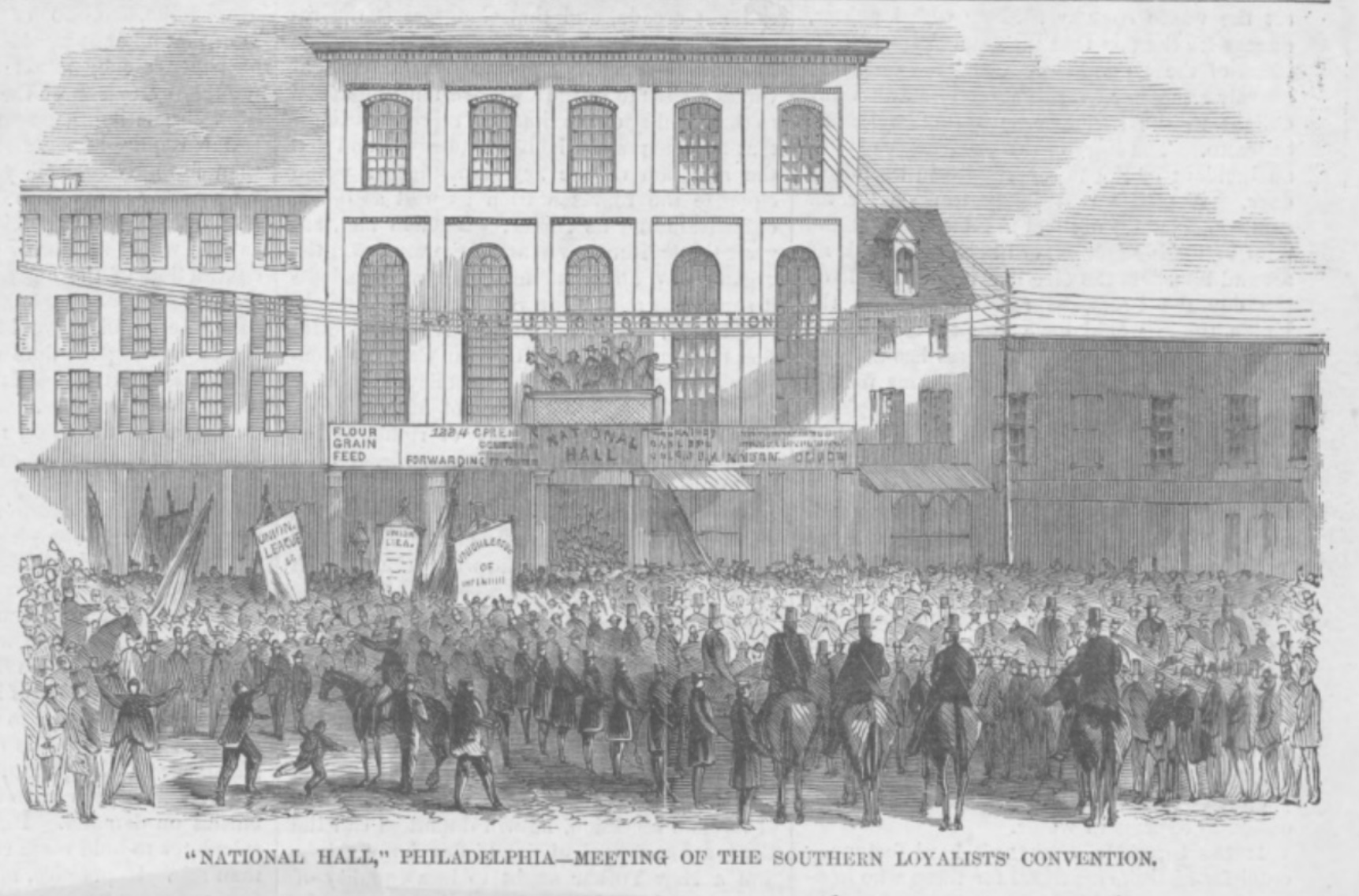
Southern Loyalists meeting, National Hall, Philadelphia, 1866. The wires are telegraph lines.

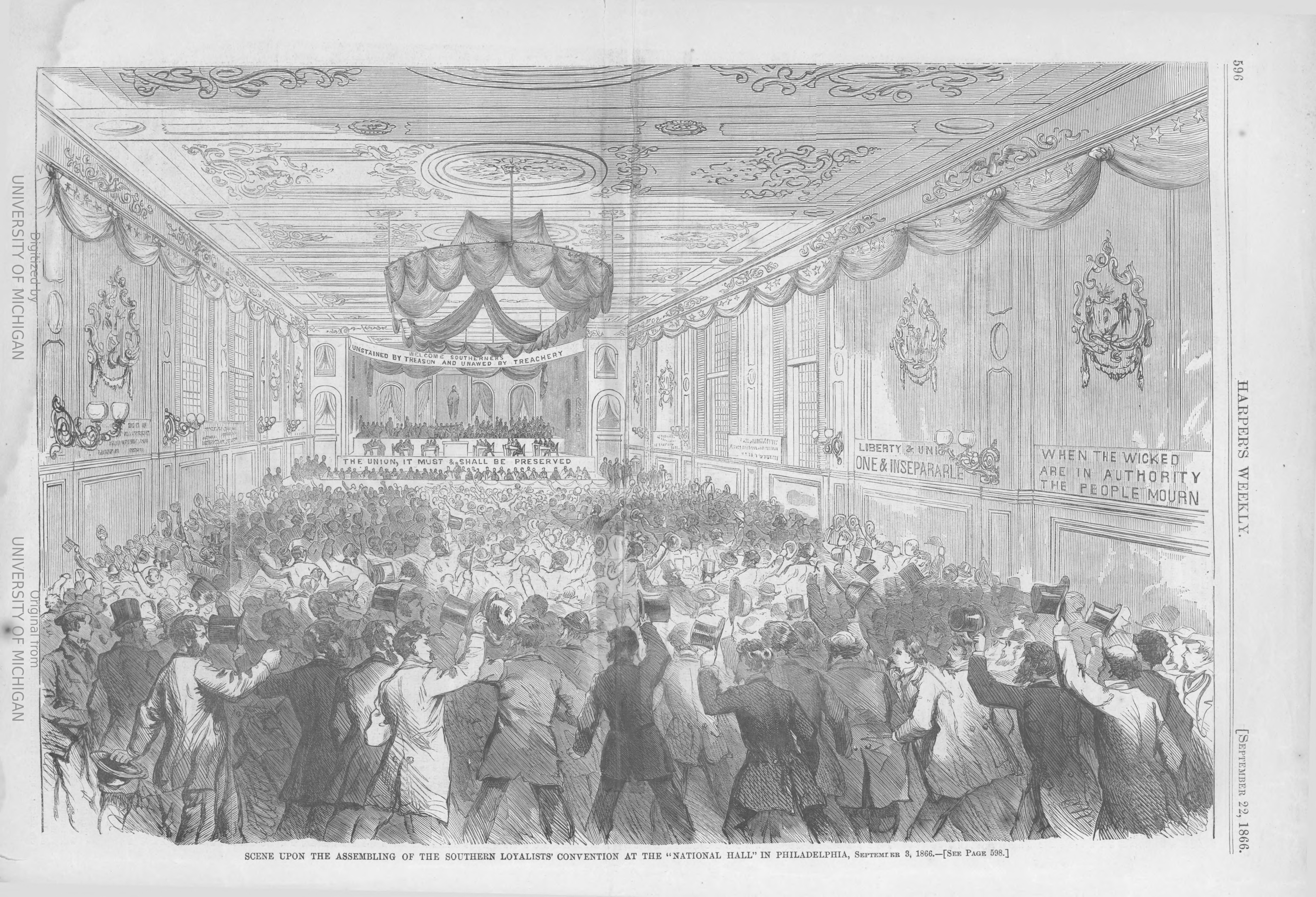
Southern Loyalists Meeting, National Hall, Philadelphia, 1866. For the text on the banners, click here.

National Hall is a former venue in Philadelphia, Pennsylvania, located at 1222–24 Market Street, between Twelfth and Thirteenth Streets. It was one of the most popular venues in the city, site of concerts, lectures, meetings, and political speeches. It opened on January 8, 1856, with a "grand operatic concert". While it existed, from 1856 to 1873, it was the main venue in Philadelphia for speakers for abolitionism and other progressive causes.

== Some meetings held in National Hall ==
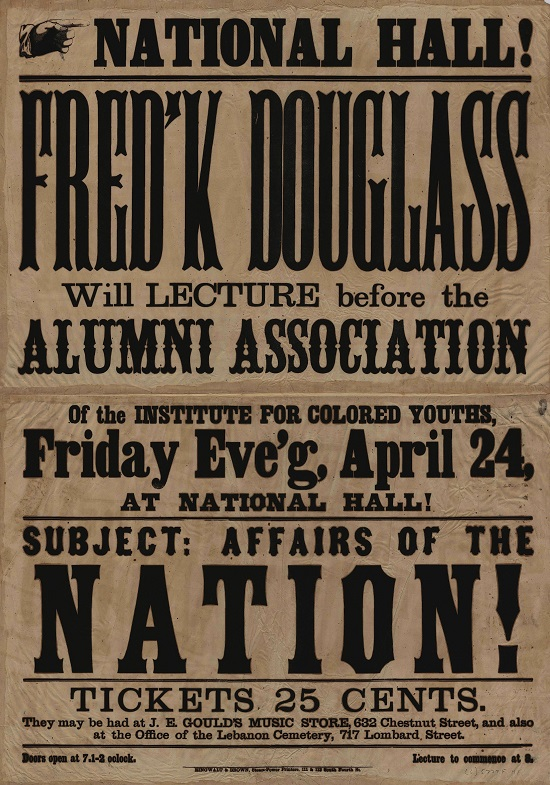
Poster announcing a lecture of Frederick Douglass in National Hall, 1863

- The 1856 American National Convention was held there.
- In 1857, John W. Forney presided over a meeting to protest President Buchanan's attempt to impose the pro-slavery Lecompton Constitution on the Kansas Territory.
- In December 1859 abolitionists held an extended vigil awaiting John Brown's execution, and afterwards continued with memorials.
- On January 5, 1861, a meeting of support was held for Major Robert Anderson, besieged at Fort Sumter.
- On March 2, 1862, a meeting was held "to take into consideration the colored people of Beaufort, S.C., who were suffering for food and clothing."
- In November, 1862, it was fitted out as a circus, and opened by Gardner & Hemmings.
- On April 24, 1863, Frederick Douglass lectured on "Affairs of the Nation" (see poster at right).
- On January 2, 1865, Octavius Catto addressed a gathering celebrating the second anniversary of the Emancipation Proclamation.
- In the spring of 1866 the Fenian Brotherhood held a meeting, and such meetings were common for the next few years.
- Frederick Douglass spoke there to a group of Southern loyalists (opposed to secession) on September 3, 1866. In Harper's Magazine there is a lengthy report on this meeting.
- In October 1871, a mass meeting expressed outrage at the election-day killing of Octavius Catto.

== Olympic Theater ==
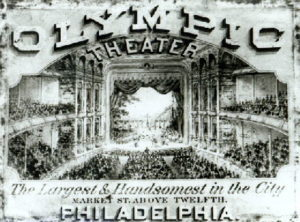
Olympic Theater, Philadelphia

In 1873 it was turned into a theatre by J. H. Johnson & Co., and opened October 21st, under the name of the Olympic Theater.

The Theater was destroyed by fire on January 29, 1874. The cause is not known, but arson was suspected. Two firemen were killed when a wall of the burning building collapsed on them. It was valued at $60,000 (equivalent to $1,707,353 in 2025).

== See also ==
- Pennsylvania Hall (Philadelphia)
