= Robert J. Mawhinney =

American lawyer

Robert J. Mawhinney (October 1, 1859 — November 18, 1954) was an attorney who served as the last Solicitor of the United States Treasury.

== Biography ==
Robert James Mawhinney was born in Philadelphia, Pennsylvania, on October 1, 1859.

In the early 1880s Mawhinney settled in Washington, D.C. and began a career in government as a telegraph operator and clerk in the United States Department of Justice.

Mawhinney graduated from National University now (George Washington University Law School) with bachelor's and master's degrees in law and was admitted to the District of Columbia Bar, afterwards joining the office of the Solicitor of the Treasury.

From 1921 to 1926 Mawhinney served as Assistant Solicitor, and he served as Solicitor from 1926 until the position was abolished in 1932.

In addition to his legal career, Mawhinney was also an author, and his published works included Digest of Opinions of the Solicitor of the Treasury and Laws of the United States Including Money, Banking and Loans.

Mawhinney died in Kensington, Maryland, on November 18, 1954.

Legal offices
Preceded by Richard Randolph McMahon	Solicitor of the United States Treasury; 1926–1932	Succeeded by Position abolished
