= Charles S. Cary =

American politician

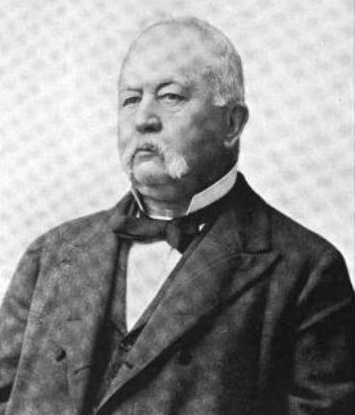
Charles S. Cary

Charles S. Cary (November 25, 1827 – August 7, 1906) was a New York lawyer, politician and railroad executive who served as Solicitor of the United States Treasury.

== Biography ==
He was born in Hornellsville, New York on November 25, 1827. He attended Alfred Academy and in 1850 graduated from State and National Law School in Ballston Spa. After passing the bar Cary began a practice in Olean.

During the Civil War Cary served as enrollment commissioner for a district that included western New York, and from 1865 to 1866 he was the federal collector of internal revenue for the same district.

In 1875 Cary was the Democratic nominee for the United States House of Representatives in a special election held to fill the vacancy caused by the death of Augustus F. Allen, and lost narrowly to Republican Nelson I. Norton. Cary could have contested the election on the grounds that Republican ballots were invalid because they were printed with the heading "For Member of Congress" rather than the legally required "For Representative in Congress." Cary declined to challenge the results, and Norton was seated.

Cary was a member of the New York State Assembly (Cattaraugus Co., 1st D.) in 1883.

A longtime friend of Grover Cleveland, in 1888 Cleveland appointed Cary Solicitor of the Treasury, and Cary served until 1889.

Cary was involved in banking, including serving as an original incorporator of the Exchange National Bank of Olean. He was also active in railroads, including holding the presidencies of the Olean, Bradford & Warren, Kendall & Eldred and Olean & Bolivar lines. In addition, he was a vice president of the Coudersport and Port Allegheny Railroad.

Cary died in Olean on August 7, 1906. He was buried in Olean's Mount View Cemetery, Section Sec-B-227.

New York State Assembly
Preceded by Elisha M. Johnson	New York State Assembly; Cattaraugus County, 1st District; 1883	Succeeded by Frederick W. Kruse
Legal offices
Preceded by Alexander McCue	Solicitor of the United States Treasury; 1888–1889	Succeeded by William P. Hepburn
