= Maurice D. O'Connell =

American lawyer (1839–1922)

Maurice D. O'Connell (April 23, 1839 – August 26, 1922) was an Iowa attorney who served as Solicitor of the United States Treasury.

== Biography ==
Maurice D. O'Connell was born in Constable, New York, on April 23, 1839. He was educated at Franklin Academy and taught school in upstate New York.

During the Civil War, O'Connell worked in the Washington, D.C. office of the Comptroller of the Currency. O'Connell studied law at Columbian University (now George Washington University) while working for the comptroller, graduated in 1866, and attained admission to the bar.

After the war, O'Connell resided in Texas for two years, where he was employed by the San Antonio National Bank.

In 1869, O'Connell moved to Fort Dodge, Iowa, where he practiced law. From 1872 to 1879, he was District Attorney for the Eleventh Judicial District, an eight county area of Iowa.

A Republican, O'Connell was appointed United States Attorney for the Northern District of Iowa in 1881, and served until Grover Cleveland was inaugurated in 1885. When Benjamin Harrison became President in 1889, O'Connell returned to the U.S. Attorney's office, serving until 1893.

In 1897, O'Connell was named Solicitor of the Treasury, and he served until 1910.

After resigning, he resided in Washington, D.C., where he continued to practice law. O'Connell died in Washington, D.C., on August 26, 1922, from injuries he sustained in a streetcar accident the previous April. He was buried in Fort Dodge.

Legal offices
Preceded by Felix A. Reeve	Solicitor of the United States Treasury; 1897–1910	Succeeded by William T. Thompson
