= Alexander McCue =

American lawyer

Alexander McCue (May 1, 1826 – April 2, 1889) was a Brooklyn, New York, attorney and judge who served as Solicitor of the United States Treasury.

== Biography ==
He was born at Matamoros, Mexico, on May 1, 1826. His parents were immigrants from Ireland, who settled in Mexico, where his father became a merchant. After his father's death, his mother relocated to Brooklyn.

McCue graduated from Columbia College in 1845, studied law with the Brooklyn firm of John Greenwood and Harmanus B. Duryea, was admitted to the bar, and began a practice in Brooklyn. From 1851 to 1852 he served as an Assistant District Attorney in Kings County.

In 1861 to 1862 and 1867 to 1868 he was Brooklyn's Corporation Counsel, and from 1870 to 1885 was a Judge of the City Court.

From 1885 to 1888 McCue served as Solicitor of the Treasury.

In 1887 McCue was named to an unpaid position on the United States Fish Commission.

After resigning as Solicitor McCue was named Assistant Treasurer of the United States, with offices in New York City.

McCue died in Brooklyn on April 2, 1889, after having suffered a stroke. He was buried at Green-Wood Cemetery, Section 107, Lot 19875

Legal offices
Preceded by Henry S. Neal	Solicitor of the United States Treasury; 1885–1888	Succeeded by Charles S. Cary
