= Henry L. Dickey =

American politician (1832–1910)

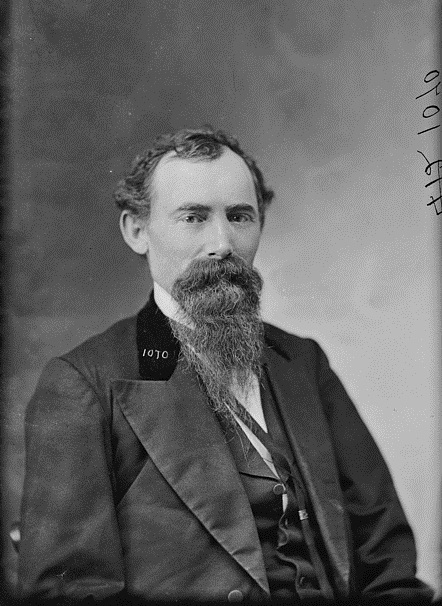

Member of the U.S. House of Representatives from Ohio
- In office March 4, 1877 – March 3, 1881
- Preceded by: Lawrence T. Neal (7th); Henry S. Neal (11th)
- Succeeded by: Frank H. Hurd (7th); Henry S. Neal (11th)
- Constituency: 7th district (1877-79); 11th district (1879-81)

Member of the Ohio House of Representatives from the Highland County district
- In office January 2, 1860 – January 6, 1862
- Preceded by: John L. Hughes
- Succeeded by: N. H. Hixon

Member of the Ohio Senate from the 6th district
- In office January 6, 1868 – January 2, 1870
- Preceded by: Silas Irion
- Succeeded by: John Woodbridge

Personal details
- Born: Henry Luther Dickey; October 29, 1832 South Salem, Ohio, U.S.
- Died: May 23, 1910 (aged 77) Greenfield, Ohio, U.S.
- Resting place: Greenfield Cemetery
- Party: Democratic
- Education: Cincinnati Law School

Henry Luther Dickey (October 29, 1832 – May 23, 1910) was an American lawyer and politician who served two terms as a U.S. representative from Ohio for two terms from 1877 to 1881.

== Biography ==
Born in South Salem, Ohio, Dickey moved with his parents to Washington Court House, Ohio, in 1836. He moved to Greenfield, Ohio, in 1847. He attended Greenfield Academy. He pursued the vocation of civil engineer, and in that capacity had charge of the construction of the Marietta and Cincinnati Railroad in Vinton County, Ohio. He resigned in 1855. He studied law. He was admitted to the bar at Chillicothe, Ohio, in 1857. He was graduated from the Cincinnati Law School in 1859.

=== Early career ===
He commenced practice in Greenfield. He served as member of the State house of representatives in 1861. He served in the State senate in 1868 and 1869.

=== Congress ===
Dickey was elected as a Democrat to the Forty-fifth and Forty-sixth Congresses (March 4, 1877 – March 3, 1881). He was not a candidate for renomination in 1880.

=== Later career and death ===
He resumed the practice of law and was admitted to practice before the Supreme Court of the United States in 1877.

He served as president of the Commercial Bank of Greenfield.

He died in Greenfield, Ohio, on May 23, 1910. He was interred in Greenfield Cemetery.

== Sources ==
- United States Congress. "Henry L. Dickey (id: D000311)". Biographical Directory of the United States Congress.

U.S. House of Representatives
Preceded by Lawrence T. Neal	Member of the U.S. House of Representatives from Ohio's 7th congressional district 1877-1879	Succeeded by Frank H. Hurd
Preceded by Henry S. Neal	Member of the U.S. House of Representatives from Ohio's 11th congressional district 1879-1881	Succeeded by Henry S. Neal
