= 8th Tennessee Infantry Regiment =

- Active: April 18, 1862 - June 30, 1865
- Country: United States
- Allegiance: Union
- Branch: Infantry
- Engagements: Atlanta campaign Battle of Resaca; Battle of Kennesaw Mountain; Battle of Peachtree Creek; Siege of Atlanta; Battle of Franklin; Battle of Nashville; Carolinas campaign Stoneman's 1865 Raid

The 8th Tennessee Infantry Regiment was an infantry regiment that served in the Union Army during the American Civil War.

== Service ==
The 8th Tennessee Infantry was organized at Camp Dick Robinson and Camp Nelson, Kentucky beginning November 11, 1862 and mustered in for a three-year enlistment on April 18, 1862, under the command of Colonel Felix A. Reeve.

The regiment was attached to District of Central Kentucky, Department of the Ohio, to June 1863, 2nd Brigade, 4th Division, XXIII Corps, Army of the Ohio, to July 1863. 2nd Brigade, 1st Division, XXIII Corps, to August 1863. 2nd Brigade, 3rd Division, XXIII Corps, to September 1863. 2nd Brigade, Left Wing Forces, XXIII Corps, to January 1864. 1st Brigade, 3rd Division, XXIII Corps, to February 1865. 1st Brigade, 3rd Division, XXIII Corps, Department of North Carolina, to June 1865.

The 8th Tennessee Infantry mustered out of service at Company Shops, North Carolina on June 30, 1865.

== Detailed service ==
Duty at Nicholasville, Ky., Camp Dick Robinson, Camp Nelson, and Lexington, Ky., until August 1863. Burnside's Campaign in eastern Tennessee August 16-October 17. At Greenville until September 19. Carter's Depot September 20–21. Jonesborough September 21. Watauga River September 25. At Bull's Gap and Jonesborough until December. About Dandridge January 16–17, 1864. Strawberry Plains January 22. Duty in eastern Tennessee until April. Atlanta Campaign May to September 1864. Demonstrations on Dalton May 5–13. Rocky Faced Ridge May 8–11. Battle of Resaca May 14–15. Cartersville May 20. Operations on line of Pumpkin Vine Creek and battles about Dallas, New Hope Church, and Allatoona Hills May 25-June 5. Operations about Marietta and against Kennesaw Mountain June 10-July 2. Lost Mountain June 15–17. Muddy Creek June 17. Allatoona June 18. Noyes Creek June 19. Cheyney's Farm June 22. Olley's Farm June 26–27. Assault in Kennesaw June 27. Nickajack Creek July 2–5. Chattahoochie River July 6–17. Buckhead, Nancy's Creek, July 18. Peachtree Creek July 19–30. Siege of Atlanta July 22-August 25. Utoy Creek August 5–7. Flank movement on Jonesboro August 25–30. Battle of Jonesboro August 31-September 1. Lovejoy's Station September 2–6. Pursuit of Hood into Alabama October 3–26. Nashville Campaign November and December. Columbia, Duck River, November 24–27. Columbia Ford November 28–29. Battle of Franklin November 30. Battle of Nashville December 15–16. Pursuit of Hood to the Tennessee River December 17–28. At Clifton, Tenn., until January 15, 1865. Movement to Washington, D.C., then to North Carolina January 15-February 9. Operations against Hoke February 11–14. Fort Anderson February 18. Town Creek February 20. Capture of Wilmington February 22. Carolinas Campaign March 1-April 26. Advance on Goldsboro March 6–21. Occupation of Goldsboro March 21. Advance on Raleigh April 10–14. Occupation of Raleigh April 14. Bennett's House April 26. Surrender of Johnston and his army. Duty at Raleigh and in the Department of North Carolina until June.

== Casualties ==
The regiment lost a total of 277 men during service; 2 officers and 48 enlisted men killed or mortally wounded, 1 officer and 226 enlisted men died of disease or accident.

== Commanders ==
- Colonel Felix A. Reeve
- Captain James W. Berry - commanded the regiment for nearly all of its service

== See also ==
- List of Tennessee Civil War units
- Tennessee in the Civil War
