= Richard Randolph McMahon =

American lawyer

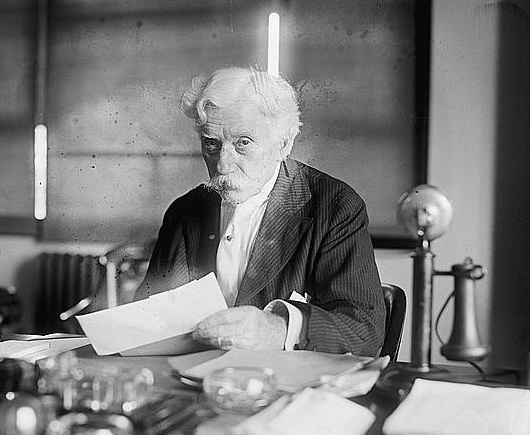
Richard Randolph McMahon

Richard Randolph McMahon (July 30, 1852 – April 19, 1935) was a lawyer from West Virginia who served as Solicitor of the United States Treasury.

== Biography ==
Richard Randolph McMahon was born in Alexandria, Virginia, on July 30, 1852. He graduated from Georgetown University and became a professor of English and Latin.

In 1877 he moved to Taylor County, West Virginia, where he worked as a newspaper columnist while studying law. In 1878 McMahon was appointed to the staff of Governor Henry M. Mathews with the rank of colonel.

A Democrat, in 1881 he became an attorney and was appointed to a position in the office of the United States Comptroller of the Treasury in the administration of Grover Cleveland.

Beginning in 1885 McMahon practiced law in Washington, D.C. and Harper's Ferry. In the 1890s McMahon became a Republican. In addition to attending numerous party conventions at the local, state and national levels as a Delegate, McMahon served on the West Virginia University Board of Regents during the administration of Governor George W. Atkinson. McMahon was also a longtime member of the Columbia Hospital for Women's Board of Directors, and was President of the board from 1908 to 1914.

In 1922 McMahon was appointed Solicitor of the Treasury, and he served until 1926.

McMahon died in Harper's Ferry on April 19, 1935.

Legal offices
Preceded by Lawrence Becker	Solicitor of the United States Treasury; 1922–1926	Succeeded by Robert J. Mawhinney
