= E. C. Banfield =

American lawyer

E. C. Banfield (September 19, 1828 – November 12, 1887) was a New Hampshire lawyer who served as Solicitor of the United States Treasury.

== Biography ==
Everett Colby Banfield was born in Wolfeboro, New Hampshire, on September 19, 1828. He was educated at Phillips Exeter Academy, graduating in 1845, and Harvard University, graduating in 1850. Banfield studied law with Nathan Clifford and John P. Healy, was admitted to the bar and practiced in Boston.

Banfield was elected to the Massachusetts House of Representatives in 1861, and served one term. In 1863, Banfield was confirmed as U.S. Consul in Algiers. He accepted a legal position in the New York Custom House in 1866. Banfield was appointed Solicitor of the Treasury in 1869 and served until 1874.

In 1874 Banfield accepted a position with the Pacific Mail Company in San Francisco. Banfield later returned to Wolfeboro, where he practiced law part-time. E. C. Banfield died in New York City on November 12, 1887. He was buried in Wolfeboro.

== Personal life ==
Banfield was married to Anne S. Fiske (1834–1915). Anne was the sister of Helen Hunt Jackson.

Legal offices
Preceded by Edward Jordan	Solicitor of the United States Treasury; 1869–1874	Succeeded by Bluford Wilson
