= James Innes Randolph =

American Confederate army officer (1837–1887)

- Born: October 25, 1837; Winchester, Virginia, U.S.
- Died: April 29, 1887 (aged 49); Baltimore, Maryland, U.S.
- Relatives: Harold Randolph (son)
- Military career
- Allegiance: Confederate States
- Branch: Confederate Army
- Rank: Major
- Conflicts: American Civil War
- Other work: Poetry

James Innes Randolph, Jr. (October 25, 1837 – April 29, 1887) was a Confederate army officer, lawyer, and poet.

== Early life and education ==
Randolph was born in Winchester, Virginia on October 25, 1837. He attended Hobart College in Geneva, New York and was a graduate of the State and National Law School in Poughkeepsie, New York.

== Career ==
=== American Civil War ===
Randolph served in the Confederate army as a topographical engineer in the American Civil War, reaching the rank of major.

=== Writings ===
After the war, he moved to Baltimore, Maryland to practice law. After giving up the practice, he wrote editorials for the Baltimore American in addition to poems. He continued writing and living in Baltimore until his death in April 1887.

His best known poem is "I'm a Good Ol' Rebel", in where he berates the U.S. and disparages its national symbols while praising the Confederacy, lamenting its defeat at the hands of the U.S.
