= 120th Illinois Infantry Regiment =

120th Regiment Illinois Volunteer Infantry
- Active: October 28, 1862 - September 10, 1865
- Country: United States
- Allegiance: Union
- Branch: Infantry
- Engagements: Battle of Brice's Crossroads

The 120th Illinois Volunteer Infantry was an infantry regiment in the Union Army during the American Civil War.

== Service ==
The 120th Illinois Infantry was organized at Camp Butler by consolidation of seven companies raised for the regiment in Vienna, Illinois and three companies raised for the 132nd Illinois Infantry at Shawneetown and mustered in for three years' service on October 28, 1862, under the command of Colonel George W. McKeaig.

The regiment was attached to 1st Brigade, District of Memphis, Tennessee, XIII Corps, Department of the Tennessee, November 1862. 1st Brigade, 2nd Division, District of Memphis, XIII Corps, to December. District of Memphis, Tennessee, XVI Corps, to March 1863. 2nd Brigade, District of Memphis, 5th Division, XVI Corps, to May 1863. Detached Brigade, District of Northeast Louisiana, to August 1863. 3rd Brigade, 2nd Division, XVI Corps, to December 1863. Post of Corinth, Mississippi, 2nd Division, XVI Corps, to January 1864. 2nd Brigade, District of Memphis, Tennessee, XVI Corps, to June 1864. 2nd Brigade, Sturgis' Expedition, June 1864. 1st Brigade, Post of Memphis, District of West Tennessee, to February 1865. Unassigned Post of Memphis, Tennessee, to June 1865. 1st Infantry Brigade, District of West Tennessee to September 1865.

The 120th Illinois Infantry mustered out of service September 7, 1865 at Memphis, Tennessee and was discharged September 10, 1865 at Camp Butler.

== Detailed service ==
Guarded railroad bridge at Jimtown until November 9, 1862. Moved to Alton, Illinois, November 9, then to Memphis, Tennessee. Garrison and provost duty at Memphis, Tennessee, November 14, 1862, until May 1863. Expedition to Marion, Arkansas, January 13–15, 1863. Moved to Vicksburg, Mississippi, May. Siege operations against Vicksburg May to July. Greenville, Mississippi, May 12. Moved to La Grange, Tennessee, July 28-August 2, then to Memphis, Tennessee, and duty there until November. Expedition into Mississippi October 10–21. Guarded train to Corinth, Mississippi, October 30-November 5. Moved to Corinth November 7, and post duty there until January 25, 1864. Moved to Memphis, Tennessee, January 25, and provost duty there until June. Sturgis' Expedition to Guntown June 1–13. Brice's (or Tishamingo) Creek, near Guntown, June 10. Ripley June 11. At Memphis, Tennessee, until September 30. Repulse of Forrest's attack on Memphis August 21. Moved to Cairo, Illinois, September 30-October 1, then to Paducah, Kentucky, October 2–3. Moved to Clifton, Tennessee, October 3–6 and to Florence October 8. Moved to Pittsburg Landing, then to Johnsonville October 8–11. Moved to Memphis October 21–23, and provost duty there until September 1865.

== Casualties ==
The regiment lost a total of 285 men during service; 20 enlisted men killed or mortally wounded, 4 officers and 261 enlisted men died of disease.

== Commanders ==
- Colonel George W. McKeaig

== See also ==
- List of Illinois Civil War units
- Illinois in the Civil War
