= Joe Bowers (song) =

American folk song

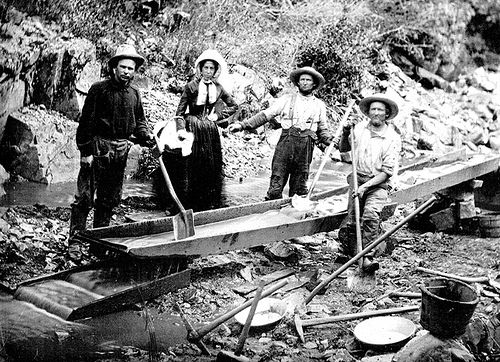
Prospectors during the California Gold Rush

"Joe Bowers", sometimes called "Old Joe Bowers", is an American folk song that originated in the 1850s. Its lyrics detail the protagonist, Joe Bowers, traveling to California from Pike County, Missouri in order to finance a home for his bride-to-be, Sally Black, though she eventually marries another man. The song was one of the most popular of its time, being a particular favorite among Confederates during the American Civil War, and still retaining relevance throughout the late 19th and early 20th century. The song is also known for later giving its tune to the anti-American Confederate song, I'm a Good Ol' Rebel.

== Lyrics ==
My name, it is Joe Bowers.
I have a brother, Ike,
I came from old Missouri,
Yes, all the way from Pike.
I'll tell you why I left there,
And how I came to roam,
To leave my dear old Mammy
So far away from home.

I used to love a girl there;
Her name was Sally Black.
I asked her to marry me;
She said it was a whack.
Says she to me, "Joe Bowers,
Before we hitch for life,
You'd ought to have a little home,
To keep your little wife."

Says I, "My dearest Sally,
Oh, Sally, for your sake,
I'll go to California
And try to raise a stake."
Says she to me, "Joe Bowers,
You are the chap to win,
So give me a kiss to seal the bargain,"
And I throwed a dozen in.

I'll never forget my feelings
When I bid adieu to all.
Sal, she catched me around the neck,
And I began to bawl.
When I set in, they all commenced,
You've never heard the like,
The way they all took on and cried
The day I left old Pike.

When I got to this here country,
I hadn't nary a red.
I had such wolfish feelings,
I wished myself most dead.
At length I went to mining,
Put in my heaviest licks,
Came down upon the boulders
Just like a thousand bricks.

I worked both late and early,
Through rain and hail and snow,
For I was working for my Sally,
And it was all the same to Joe.
I made a very lucky strike,
As the gold itself did tell,
For I was working for my Sally,
The girl I loved so well.

One day I got a letter
From my kind, dear brother Ike.
It came from old Missouri,
Yes, all the way from Pike.
It told me the goldarndest news
That ever you did hear.
My heart it is a-bursting,
So pray excuse this tear.

It said my Sally was fickle.
Her love for me had fled,
That she had married a butcher
Whose hair was awful red.
It told me more than that,
It's enough to make me swear,
Said Sally had a baby,
And the baby had red hair.
