= I'm a Good Ol' Rebel =

Pro-Confederate folk song

The Confederacy's flag at the end of the American Civil War

"I'm a Good Ol' Rebel", also called "The Good Old Rebel", is a pro-Confederate folk song and rebel song commonly attributed to Major James Innes Randolph. It was initially created by Randolph as a poem before evolving into an oral folk song and was only published in definitive written form in 1914. The poem and song became universally-known among Southerners during the Reconstruction period following the capitulation of the Confederate States at the end of the American Civil War.

== Background ==
After the Confederacy's loss to the U.S. in the American Civil War, "I'm a Good Ol' Rebel" was created as a poem by former Confederate major James Innes Randolph in the 1860s. Its music was based upon the Minstrel song "Joe Bowers". It is not known who initially created the music, with a claim in 1864 attributing it to "J.R.T." and an 1866 sheet music copy ironically dedicating it to Thad Stevens.

"I'm a Good Ol' Rebel" was first published as a poem locally in Maryland in 1898 but was published as a song nationwide in the April 4, 1914 edition of Collier's Weekly. The song is anti-Unionist in tone, expressing hatred towards the U.S. and its national symbols such as the U.S. Constitution and U.S. Declaration of Independence. It reflected a view held by some ex-Confederates who were reluctant to accept Reconstruction with the United States and an expression of the bitterness and anger they felt after the Confederacy had lost the American Civil War to the U.S. However, it is speculated that the song did not reflect Randolph's personal views and was intended "... to illustrate the irreconcilable spirit of the illiterate in some sections", as it had been sung and passed through oral tradition throughout Southern bars.

The published version initially contained only four verses, but individual performers have added their own verses to reflect their own opinions on the United States.

== Legacy ==
The song became known outside the United States. The American-born Consuelo Montagu, Duchess of Manchester, once performed the song uncensored for the future King Edward VII when he was Prince of Wales in London. Upon hearing the song, he later requested a repeat performance of "...that fine American song with the cuss words in it."

== Modern Versions ==
The soundtrack for the film The Long Riders (1980), (a biopic about the James-Younger Gang), musician/composer Ry Cooder arranged a version consisting of 4 verses.

In 1991, a version was released on the Songs of the Civil War album performed by Hoyt Axton.

Jeremy Renner sang the opening verses in a scene for The Assassination of Jesse James by the Coward Robert Ford (2007).

== Lyrics ==
O I'm a good old rebel,
Now that's just what I am.
For this "fair land of freedom"
I do not care a damn.
I'm glad I fought against it,
I only wish we'd won,
And I don't want no pardon
For anything I done.

I hates the Constitution,
This great republic too,
I hates the Freedmans' Buro,
In uniforms of blue.
I hates the nasty eagle,
With all his braggs and fuss,
The lyin' thievin' Yankees,
I hates 'em wuss and wuss.

I hates the Yankees nation
And everything they do,
I hates the Declaration,
Of Independence, too.
I hates the glorious Union-
'Tis dripping with our blood-
I hates their striped banner,
I fought it all I could

I rode with Robert E. Lee,
For four year near about,
Got wounded in three places
And starved at Point Lookout
I caught the rheumatism
A' campin' in the snow,
But I killed a chance o' Yankees
I'd like to kill some mo'.

Three hundred thousand Yankees
Is stiff in Southern dust,
We got three hundred thousand
Before they conquered us.
They died of Southern fever
And Southern steel and shot,
I wish they was three million
Instead of what we got.

I can't take up my musket
And fight 'em now no more,
But I ain't going to love 'em,
Now that is sarten sure,
And I don't want no pardon
For what I was and am.
I won't be reconstructed,
And I don't care a damn.
