= John L. Vance =

American politician

John Luther Vance
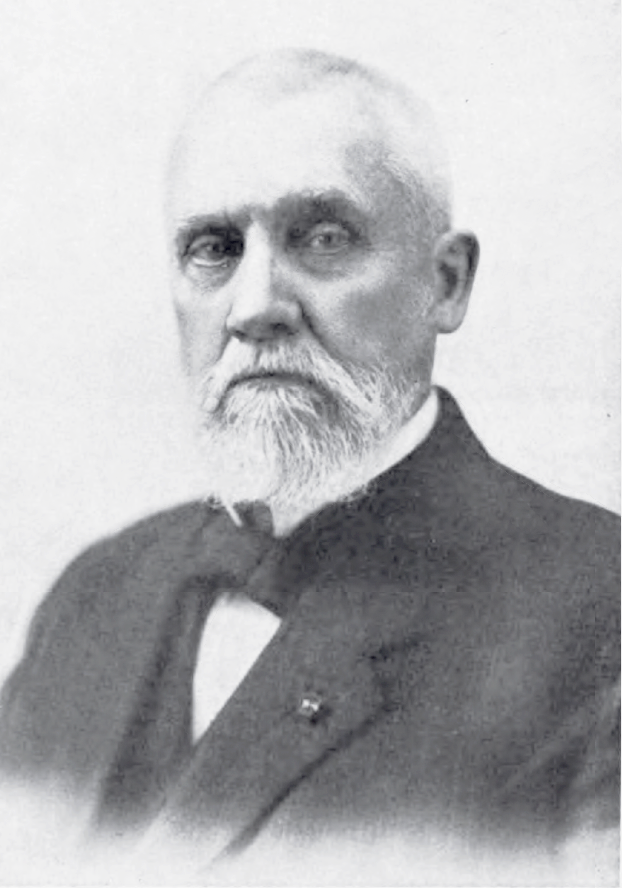

Member of the U.S. House of Representatives from Ohio's 11th district
- In office March 4, 1875 – March 3, 1877
- Preceded by: Hezekiah S. Bundy
- Succeeded by: Henry S. Neal

Personal details
- Born: July 19, 1839 Gallipolis, Ohio, U.S.
- Died: June 10, 1921 (aged 81) Gallipolis, Ohio, U.S.
- Party: Democratic
- Spouse: Emily F. Shepard
- Children: four
- Education: Cincinnati Law School
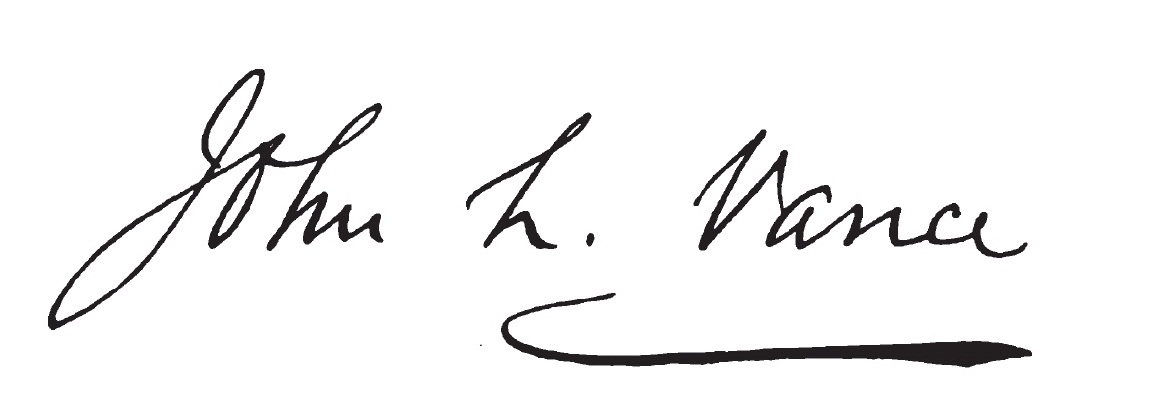
- Signature

John Luther Vance (July 19, 1839 – June 10, 1921) was a U.S. representative from Ohio.

== Biography ==
Vance was born in Gallipolis, Ohio and attended the public schools and Gallia Academy, Ohio.

He graduated from the Cincinnati Law School in April 1861, and was admitted to the bar the same year.

== Civil War service ==
He enlisted in April 1861 in the Union Army and served successively as captain, major, and lieutenant colonel in the 4th West Virginia Volunteer Infantry Regiment until he mustered out in December 1864.

== Postbellum ==
After the war he established and published the Gallipolis Bulletin in 1867 and commenced the practice of law in Gallipolis, Ohio, in 1870.

He served as delegate to the 1872 Democratic National Convention and was elected as a Democrat to the Forty-fourth Congress (March 4, 1875 – March 3, 1877).

He was an unsuccessful candidate for reelection in 1876 to the Forty-fifth Congress and resumed his former newspaper business.

He served as president of the Ohio River Improvement Association from shortly after 1877 until his death.

He died in Gallipolis, Ohio, on June 10, 1921, and was interred in Pine Street Cemetery.

Vance was married to Emily F. Shepard of Gallipolis on October 4, 1866. They had four children.

Vance was a member of the Masonic fraternity, and the Grand Army of the Republic.

U.S. House of Representatives
Preceded by Hezekiah S. Bundy	Member of the U.S. House of Representatives from Ohio's 11th congressional district March 4, 1875 – March 3, 1877	Succeeded by Henry S. Neal
