= George F. Talbot =

American lawyer

George Foster Talbot (January 16, 1819 – August 17, 1907) was a Maine attorney who served as Solicitor of the United States Treasury.

== Biography ==
Talbot was born in East Machias, Maine on January 16, 1819. He graduated from Bowdoin College in 1837, taught school while studying law, and in 1840 became an attorney in East Machias and Skowhegan.

In 1840 Talbot received a Master of Arts degree from Bowdoin.

While practicing in East Machias Talbot served in local offices, including Superintendent of Schools and County Attorney for Washington County.

In 1849 and 1850 Talbot was the Free Soil Party's nominee for Governor of Maine, losing three way races to John Hubbard.

A Republican after that party was founded, Talbot attended numerous conventions at the local, county, state and national levels, including the 1860 convention that nominated Abraham Lincoln.

He relocated to Portland when he was appointed United States Attorney for Maine in 1861. Talbot served in this position until 1870.

From 1876 to 1877 Talbot served as Solicitor of the Treasury.

Talbot was an author, and his most prominent work was 1883's Jesus His Opinions and Character: The New Testament Studies of a Layman.

Talbot was also a poet, and some of his work was published.

Talbot died in Portland on August 17, 1907.

Party political offices
| First | Free Soil nominee for Governor of Maine; 1849, 1850 | Succeeded by Ezekiel Holmes |
Legal offices
| Preceded by Bluford Wilson | Solicitor of the United States Treasury; 1876–1877 | Succeeded by Kenneth Rayner |
