= Felix A. Reeve =

American lawyer

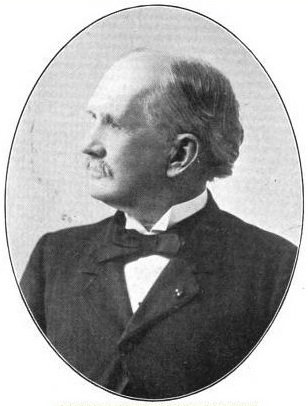
- Felix A. Reeve, Colonel, 8th Tennessee Volunteer Infantry Regiment (Union)
- Born: September 4, 1836; Cocke County, Tennessee, U.S.
- Died: November 15, 1920 (aged 84); Washington D.C., U.S.
- Burial place: Arlington National Cemetery
- Military career
- Allegiance: Union
- Branch: Union Army
- Service years: 1861–1864
- Rank: Colonel (Union Army)
- Commands: 8th Tennessee Volunteer Infantry
- Conflicts: American Civil War
- Other work: Solicitor of the United States Treasury

Felix Alexander Reeve (September 4, 1836 – November 15, 1920) was a Tennessee Unionist who fought for the North in the American Civil War. An attorney, after the war he also served as Solicitor of the United States Treasury.

== Biography ==
Felix Alexander Reeve was born in Cocke County, Tennessee, on September 4, 1836. He studied law, was admitted to the bar, and started to practice in 1861.

During the Civil War Reeve remained loyal to the Union and raised the 8th Tennessee Volunteer Infantry, which organized at Camp Dick Robinson and Camp Nelson in Kentucky from November 1862 to August 1863. He commanded with the rank of colonel. Reeve fought in several actions in Tennessee and Georgia before resigning his commission in 1864

After the war Reeve practiced law, first in Cocke County and later in Knoxville.

In 1880 Reeve moved to Washington, D.C., to work for the United States Department of the Treasury. He served in several positions, and for most of his government career was Assistant Solicitor of the Treasury.

From 1893 to 1897 Reeve served as Solicitor of the Treasury.

After serving as Solicitor, Reeve returned to the position of Assistant Solicitor.

In 1908 Reeve played a role in the campaign for President when a 1906 letter from Grover Cleveland to Reeve, in which Cleveland disparaged Democratic nominee William Jennings Bryan, was made public.

Reeve died in Washington, D.C., on November 15, 1920. He is buried at Arlington National Cemetery, Section 3, Site 1716.

Legal offices
Preceded by William P. Hepburn	Solicitor of the United States Treasury; 1893–1897	Succeeded by Maurice D. O'Connell
