= Kenneth Rayner =

American politician

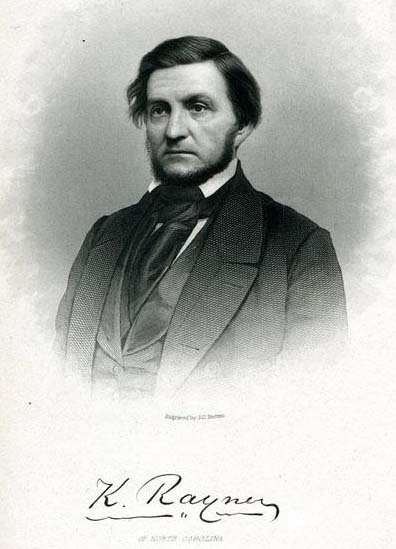

19th Solicitor of the United States Treasury
- In office July 1, 1877 – March 5, 1884
- President: Rutherford B. Hayes; James A. Garfield; Chester A. Arthur; Grover Cleveland
- Preceded by: George F. Talbot
- Succeeded by: Henry S. Neal

Member of the U.S. House of Representatives from North Carolina
- In office March 4, 1839 – March 3, 1845
- Preceded by: Samuel Tredwell Sawyer
- Succeeded by: Asa Biggs
- Constituency: 1st district (1839–43); 9th district (1843–45)

Personal details
- Born: June 20, 1808 Bertie County, North Carolina, U.S.
- Died: March 5, 1884 (aged 75) Washington, D.C., U.S.
- Party: Whig

Kenneth Rayner (June 20, 1808 – March 5, 1884) was an American lawyer and politician who served three terms as a Whig U.S. congressman from North Carolina between 1839 and 1845.

== Early life and career ==
Born in Bertie County, North Carolina, Rayner attended Tarborough Academy, then studied law and was admitted to the bar in 1829. Rayner moved to Hertford County, where he practiced law.

== U.S. House ==
In 1835, Rayner was a delegate to the state Constitutional Convention; he served terms in the North Carolina House of Commons in 1835 and 1836 before being elected to the U.S. Congress in 1838. He served three terms as a Whig, in the 26th, 27th, and 28th Congresses (March 4, 1839 – March 3, 1845).

== Life after Congress ==
Rayner did not run for a fourth term in 1844. He then returned to the State House, serving in 1846, 1848, and 1850. He was then elected to the North Carolina Senate in 1854. In the 1860 United States presidential election, he would support and campaign for the Constitutional Union Party ticket of John Bell and Edward Everett, who would go on to lose the election to Abraham Lincoln.

In 1871 Rayner was appointed by President Grant as one of the court commissioners to settle the Alabama Claims. From 1877 to 1884 he was Solicitor of the United States Treasury.

== Death ==
Rayner died in Washington, D.C., on March 5, 1884, and is buried in Raleigh, North Carolina.

U.S. House of Representatives
Preceded by Samuel T. Sawyer	Member of the U.S. House of Representatives from North Carolina's 1st congressional district 1839–1843	Succeeded by Thomas L. Clingman
Preceded by Augustine H. Shepperd	Member of the U.S. House of Representatives from North Carolina's 9th congressional district 1843–1845	Succeeded by Asa Biggs
Legal offices
Preceded by George F. Talbot	Solicitor of the United States Treasury; 1877–1884	Succeeded by Henry S. Neal
