= Solicitor of the United States Treasury =

Former government position

The Solicitor of the Treasury position was created in the United States Department of the Treasury by an act of May 29, 1830 4 Stat. 414, which changed the name of the Agent of the Treasury.

== Function ==
The Solicitor of the Treasury served as legal advisor to the department, and examined Treasury officers' official bonds and related legal documents. He also supervised all legal proceedings involving the collection of debts due the United States. In addition, he established regulations to guide customs collectors, issued distress warrants against delinquent revenue collectors or receivers of public money, and administered lands acquired by the United States in payment for debts.

== Predecessor agencies ==
- Comptroller of the Treasury (1789–1817)
- First Comptroller of the Treasury (1817–20)
- Agent of the Treasury (1820–30)

== Position abolished ==
The position of Solicitor of the Treasury was abolished by an act of May 10, 1934 (48 Stat. 759).

== Successor agency ==
The Solicitor of the Treasury's position was succeeded by the Office of the General Counsel for the Department of the Treasury.

== List of Solicitors of the Treasury ==
Parties

Democrat Republican Whig

Status

Denotes an Acting Solicitor of the Treasury

No.	Portrait	Name	State of residence	Took office	Left office
1		Virgil Maxcy	Maryland	May 29, 1830	June 15, 1837
2		Henry D. Gilpin	Pennsylvania	June 16, 1837	January 11, 1840
3		Matthew Birchard	Massachusetts	January 16, 1840	March 17, 1841
4		Charles B. Penrose	Pennsylvania	March 17, 1841	March 4, 1845
5		Seth Barton	Louisiana	March 25, 1845	May 27, 1847
6		Ransom H. Gillet	New York	May 27, 1847	October 30, 1849
7		John C. Clark	New York	October 31, 1849	October 25, 1852
8		George F. Comstock	New York	November 15, 1852	March 30, 1853
–		Gilbert Rodman; Acting	Pennsylvania	March 30, 1853	April 8, 1853
9		John Carroll LeGrand	Maryland	April 8, 1853	May 2, 1853
10		Albert Constable	Maryland	May 2, 1853	June 3, 1853
11		Farris B. Streeter	Pennsylvania	June 3, 1853	December 1, 1857
12		Junius Hillyer	Georgia	December 1, 1857	February 13, 1861
–		Benjamin F. Pleasants; Acting	Kentucky	February 13, 1861	March 28, 1861
13		Edward Jordan	Ohio	March 28, 1861	April 15, 1869
14		Everett C. Banfield	Massachusetts	April 15, 1869	June 22, 1874
15		Bluford Wilson	Illinois	June 22, 1874	July 24, 1876
16		George F. Talbot	Maine	July 24, 1876	July 1, 1877
17		Kenneth Rayner	North Carolina	July 1, 1877	March 5, 1884
18		Henry S. Neal	Ohio	July 2, 1884	April 13, 1885
19		Alexander McCue	New York	April 13, 1885	1888
20		Charles S. Cary	New York	1888	1889
21		William P. Hepburn	Iowa	1889	1893
22		Felix A. Reeve	Tennessee	1893	1897
23		Maurice D. O'Connell	Iowa	1897	1910
24		William T. Thompson	Nebraska	1910	1913
–		Felix A. Reeve; Acting	Tennessee	1913	1914
25		Lawrence Becker	Indiana	1915	1922
26		Richard Randolph McMahon	West Virginia	1922	1926
27		Robert J. Mawhinney	Maryland	1926	1932
