= Pluckley =

Village in Kent, England

Coordinates: 51.1761°N 0.7578°E

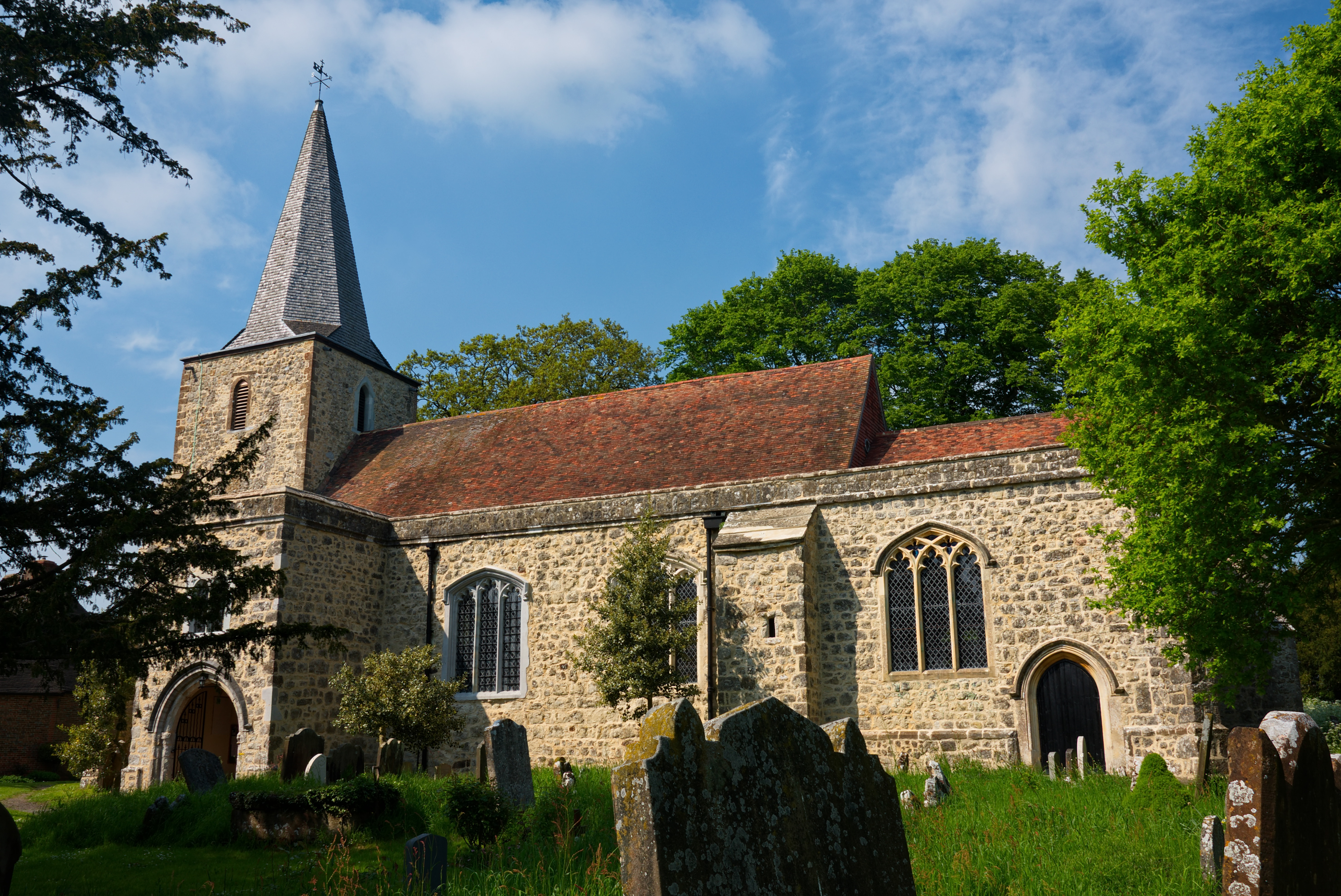
- St Nicholas' Church, Pluckley

- Location within Kent
- Area: 12.63 km^{2} (4.88 sq mi)
- Population: 1,069 (Civil Parish 2011)
  - Density: 85/km^{2} (220/sq mi)
- OS grid reference: TQ927455
- Civil parish: Pluckley
- District: Ashford
- Shire county: Kent
- Region: South East
- Country: England
- Sovereign state: United Kingdom
- Post town: Ashford
- Postcode district: TN27
- Dialling code: 01233
- Police: Kent
- Fire: Kent
- Ambulance: South East Coast
- UK Parliament: Weald of Kent
- Website: Village website

Pluckley is a village and civil parish in the Ashford district of Kent, England. The civil parish includes the adjacent hamlet of Pluckley Thorne.

== Geography ==
The landscape of the area itself is the edge of a well-drained plain, with the lowest slopes of the Kent Downs to the northwest. Pluckley is mostly agricultural in land use and centred 5 miles (8.0 km) west of Ashford.

== History ==
References to Pluckley can be found in the Domesday Book of 1086, at which time it was a more significant settlement than the now considerably larger town of Ashford.

The village's parish church, the Church of St Nicholas dates primarily to the 13th and 14th centuries. The Dering Chapel, separated from the rest of the church by two screens and found at the east end of the south aisle, was built in 1475. The nave contains brasses dedicated to members of the Dering family, all of which were made in the 1630s by Sir Edward Dering.

== Places of interest ==
Surrenden Manor was the former residence of Sir Edward Dering, 1st Baronet (1598–1644), who is buried locally, and it was here that the Dering Manuscript, the earliest extant manuscript text of any Shakespearean play, was discovered. The manuscript provides a single-play version of both Henry IV, Part 1 and Henry IV, Part 2. The consensus of Shakespeare scholars is that the Dering MS represents a redaction prepared around 1613, perhaps for family or amateur theatrics.

Elvey Farm dates from 1496 and includes a collection of stables and outbuildings dating from the 16th to 18th centuries.

== Transport ==
The village, approximately 5 miles (8 km) from the nearest junction of the M20 motorway, is served by Pluckley railway station, about 1.25 miles (2 km) to the south. It lies on the Greensand Way long-distance walking route and is close to the Stour Valley Walk.

== Haunting ==
Pluckley had an entry in the 1989 Guinness Book of Records for being "the most haunted village in Britain", with 12 different ghosts reported; the category is no longer in use by Guinness, and a visiting Daily Telegraph journalist in 2008 cast doubt on the veracity of the claims.

Pluckley is the location of many supernatural television programmes, such as Strange but True?, Most Haunted and Ghostly Legends. It still attracts amateur ghost hunters today. Among the most famous reported hauntings is that of the Red Lady or Lady Dering (who died in the 12th century), sighted in the churchyard of St Nicholas. Other reputed hauntings include a ghostly monk, a phantom highwayman and a gypsy woman, called Susan Richardson, who died in mysterious circumstances. Three of these are all within a few feet at the road junction ghost hunters have dubbed Fright Corner. Dering or "Screaming" wood is also said to be a strong focus of paranormal activity.

== Appearances in the media ==
The ITV drama series The Darling Buds of May was filmed in the village (doubling for Sidcup) in the early 1990s.

The village's official status as "the most haunted village in Britain" has drawn many TV and radio series there.

- An episode of the LWT television series Strange but True?, titled "Pluckley – The most haunted village in England", was broadcast on 13 September 1996.
- An episode of the Living TV television series Most Haunted: Midsummer Murders, which investigated the murder of highwayman Robert Du Bois in the Screaming Woods, was broadcast on 10 July 2007.
- An episode of the Syfy television series Ghost Hunters International, titled "Haunted Village", featuring The Black Horse Inn, Elvey Farm, and The Screaming Woods, was broadcast on 30 January 2008.
- An episode of the Channel 4 television variety show Sunday Night Project, featuring Justin Lee Collins, Alan Carr and guest host Will Young investigating a mill and camping overnight in the Screaming Woods, was broadcast on 20 July 2008.
- The KMFM radio Hallowe'en special Frightday Night, featuring The Black Horse Inn and The Screaming Woods, was broadcast on 31 October 2009.
- An episode of the BBC Radio 4 radio series Open Country, which investigated the hauntings and their effects of village life, was broadcast on 4 November 2010.

Pluckley was also featured on an episode of BBC's Top Gear. Two of the presenters, James May and Richard Hammond, were filming a review of the Smart Forfour. The presenters spent 24 consecutive hours in the car, spending the night in the Screaming Woods.

Pluckley was the featured haunting in series 1, episode 9 of The ParaPod. This is the episode that first featured Barry's Taxi, as Barry takes listeners on a spoken tour of the village and its supposedly haunted locations.

Pluckley was also featured on an episode of CITV's It's a Mystery. One of the presenters, Tristan Bancks, went to investigate a number of haunted areas within the village from the Screaming Woods, the Haunted Highway known as Fright Corner to the ghost of a gypsy woman selling watercress near Pinnock Bridge.

Pluckley was also host to a concert by Eric Clapton, held in St Peter's Hall, to raise funds for the Crossroads Centre in 1997. The concert featured appearances from Willie Nelson, Barry White and Bob Dylan.

== See also ==
Conington, Huntingdonshire, also rumoured to be haunted by the ghost of a colonel
