= Sir Edward Dering, 1st Baronet =

English politician

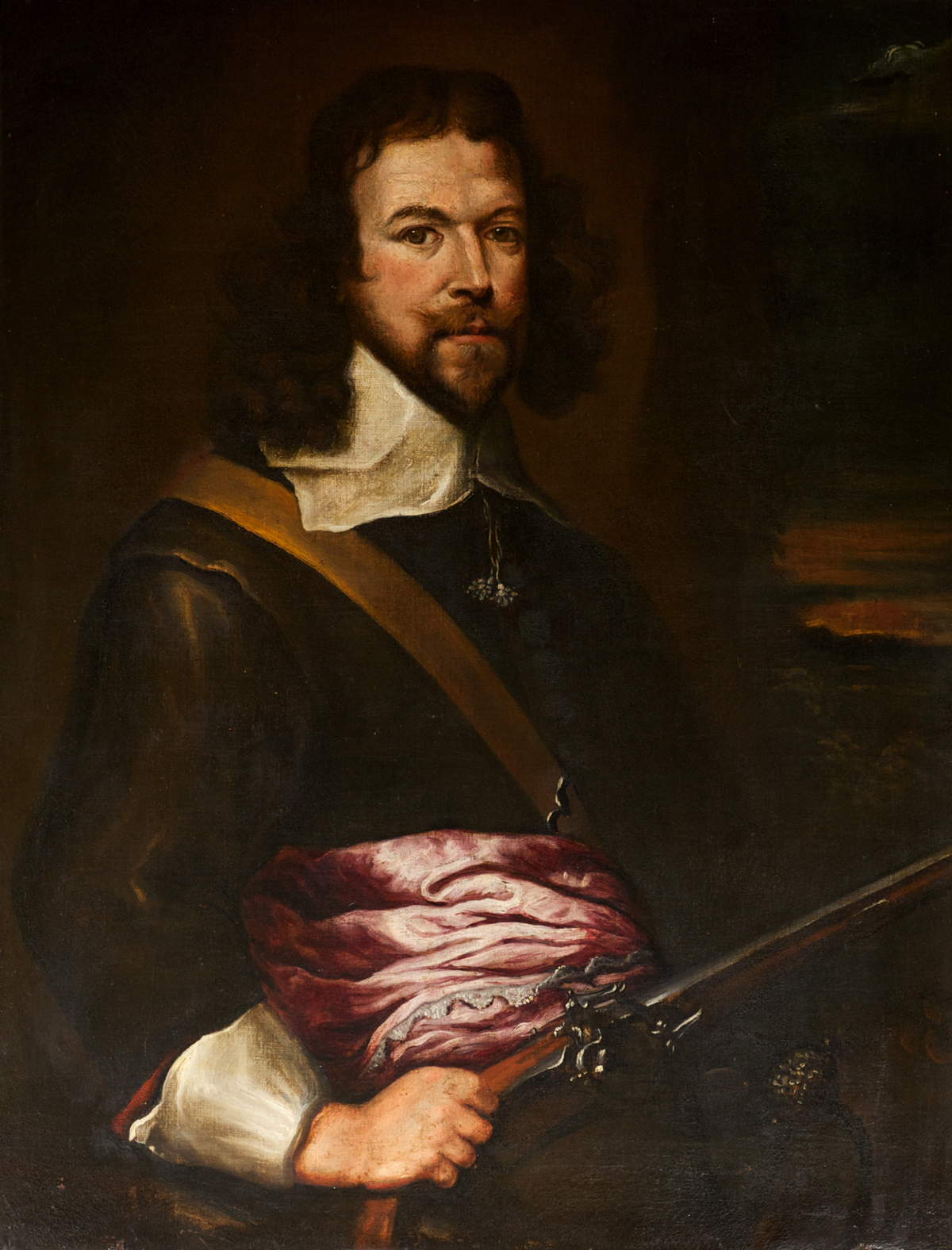
Sir Edward Dering by William Dobson

Sir Edward Dering, 1st Baronet (1598–1644) of Surrenden Dering, Pluckley, Kent, was an English antiquary and politician.

== Ancestry and childhood ==
Dering was the eldest son of Sir Anthony Dering (d. 1636) of Surrenden Dering. His mother, Sir Anthony's second wife, was Frances, daughter of Chief Baron Robert Bell.

He was born in the Tower of London on 28 January 1598, his father being the deputy-lieutenant. He was educated at Magdalene College, Cambridge.

== Early career ==
After leaving the university he devoted himself to antiquarian studies and to the collection of manuscripts. On 22 January 1619 he was knighted at Newmarket, and in November of the same year married Elizabeth, daughter of Sir Nicholas Tufton. She died on 24 January 1622. According to an entry in his account book, he purchased two copies of William Shakespeare's First Folio on 5 December 1623: this is the earliest recorded retail purchase of this famous book.

Dering subsequently married Anne, daughter of Sir John Ashburnham. Lady Ashburnham, his new mother-in-law, being of the Beaumont family, was a connection of the king's favourite, Buckingham. Through her, Dering strove for court favour and was created a baronet on 1 February 1626 (1627 New Style). Buckingham's assassination in 1628 cut short Dering's ambitions at court. He lost his second wife in the same year that he lost his patron.

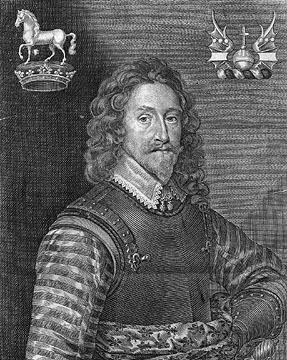
Sir Edward Dering

On 20 November in the year of his wife's death, Dering became one of the many suitors of a rich city widow, Mrs Bennett, and kept a curious journal of his efforts to win her, especially of the bribes which he administered to the lady's servants. Mrs Bennett, however, married Sir Heneage Finch on 16 April 1629, and shortly afterwards Dering married his third wife, Unton, daughter of Sir Ralph Gibbs, his 'ever dear Numps', as he calls her in the letters which he addressed to her. He had lately been appointed lieutenant of Dover Castle, an office for which he paid the late holder of the post, and which brought him in much less than he expected. When he, at last, managed to be quit of it, he was able to devote himself more freely to the antiquarian pursuits at which he was most at home.

== Religious belief and controversy ==
Antiquarian studies could, in the days of William Laud's power, hardly fail to connect themselves with reflections on the existing state of the church. Dering was one of a numerous class which was distinctly protestant without being puritan.

Since his father's death in 1636 he was the owner of the family property (the house and park of Surrenden Dering, now known as Surrenden House), and a person of consequence in Kent. Sir Edward served as Member of Parliament for Hythe in 1629. He was chosen to represent Kent in the Long Parliament.

He took an active part in all measures of church reform, and became chairman of the committee on religion. On 13 January 1641, having had a petition from 2500 of his constituents sent to him for presentation, in which they complained about the government of archbishops, etc. and which asked the House of Commons 'that the said government, with all its dependencies, root and branch, may be abolished', he altered the petition and made it ask 'that this hierarchical power may be totally abrogated', so as to avoid committing himself to an approval of divine-right presbyterianism. During Strafford's trial he took the popular side, "and wrote to his wife how he heard people say 'God bless your worship'" as he passed.

On 27 May Dering moved the first reading of the Root and Branch Bill, which is said to have been drawn up by Oliver St John, apparently not because he thoroughly sympathised with its prayer, but because he thought its introduction would terrify the lords into passing a bill for the exclusion of bishops from their seats in parliament which was then before them:

... the chief end then was to expedite the progress of another bill against the secular jurisdiction of the bishops (at that time) labouring in the House of Lords... I did not dream... at that time of extirpation and abolition of any more than his achiepiscopacy: our professed rooters themselves (many of them) at that hour had, I persuade myself, more moderate hopes than since are entertained.

Dering's real sentiments were disclosed when the bill was in committee, when he argued in defence of primitive episcopacy, that is to say, of a plan for ensuring that bishops should do nothing without the concurrence of their clergy. It was a plan which appealed strongly to students of antiquity; but it is no wonder that he was now treated by the more thoroughgoing opponents of episcopacy as a man who could no longer be trusted.

In the debate on 12 October on the second Bishops Exclusion Bill, Dering proposed that a national synod should be called to remove the distractions of the church. In the discussion on the Grand Remonstrance, he assailed the doctrine that bishops had brought popery and idolatry into the church, and he subsequently defended the retention of bishops on the ground that, if the prizes of the lottery were taken away, few would care to acquire learning. By his final vote on the Grand Remonstrance, he threw in his lot with the episcopal royalist party. It was the vote, not of a statesman, but of a student, anxious to find some middle term between the rule of Laud and the rule of a Scottish presbytery, and attacking the party which at any moment seemed likely to acquire undue predominance. He was alarmed by the democratic nature of the Remonstrance: "I did not dream" he remarked "that we would remonstrate downwards, tell stories to the People, and speak of the King as a third person".

Dering began to overestimate the amount of consistency which lies at the bottom of almost all changes of opinion honestly made. He prepared for publication an edition of his speeches with explanatory comments of his own. On 4 February the House of Commons ordered the book to be burnt and himself to be sent to the Tower. He remained a prisoner till the 11th.

Dering's imprisonment probably threw him more decidedly on the king's side than he had intended. On 25 March he took a leading part in the Maidstone assizes in getting up a petition from the grand jury in favour of episcopacy and the prayer book. On this, he was impeached by the commons, but he contrived to escape.

== English Civil War ==
At the opening of the civil war, Dering raised a regiment of cavalry for the king.

Dering was even less a soldier than he was a statesman. He was in bad health, and the talk of the camp probably disgusted him. Even before the battle of Edgehill he inquired on what terms he might be allowed to submit to parliament. Nothing came of the negotiation, but before the opening of the campaign of 1643 he threw up his commission. It is said that he asked the king in vain to give him the deanery of Canterbury. Every month that passed must have made his position at Oxford more painful. Not only had primitive episcopacy vanished, but Charles in September made a cessation with the confederate Catholics of Ireland, and negotiations were subsequently opened with the object of bringing Irish catholic soldiers into England.

On 30 January 1644 parliament issued a declaration offering pardon to those who had taken up arms against them if they would take the covenant and pay a composition for the restoration of their sequestered estates. Dering was the first to accept the terms, and he had leave to go home. The composition was settled at £1,000 on 27 July; but Dering, who had been kept out of his property till his payment had been arranged, was already beyond parliamentary jurisdiction. He died on 22 June 1644, having suffered much from poverty after his return.

Dering's position at the end of his life may be best illustrated by a Discourse on Sacrifice, which was published by him in June 1644, though it was written in the summer of 1640. In issuing it to the world he declares that he wishes for peace and for the return of the king to his parliament. "In the meantime," he adds, "I dare wish that he would make less value of such men both lay and clergy who, by running on the Canterbury pace, have made our breaches so wide and take less delight in the specious way of cathedral devotions". These words exhibit Dering as a fair representative of that important part of the nation which set itself against extreme courses, though it was unable to embody its desires in any practically working scheme.

== Antiquarian studies ==
Dering's antiquarian interests led him to amass a great library; his name is still associated with:

the Dering Roll, an important 13th century Roll of arms, believed to be the earliest surviving English roll of arms. In 2008, the Roll was purchased by the British Library.
The Dering Manuscript of Henry IV, Part 1, the earliest surviving manuscript of a play by William Shakespeare.

He concocted an ancient Saxon pedigree for himself, inserting details into various authentic documents and installing fake monuments in the church.

== Personal life and descendants ==
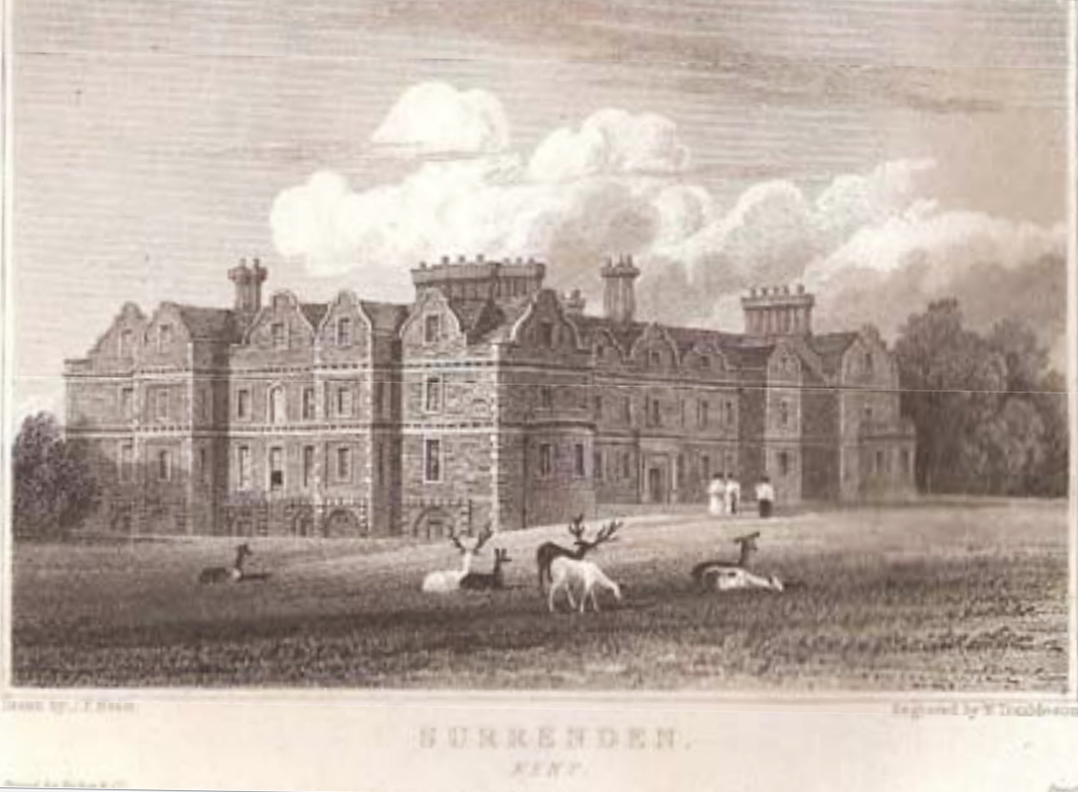
Surrenden Dering house, c.1820

Sir Edward was married three times:

1. On 25 November 1619 at St Dionis Backchurch, London (since demolished), to Elizabeth Tufton (1602/3-1622/3), eldest daughter of Nicholas Tufton, later 1st Earl of Thanet, by Lady Frances Cecil, daughter of Thomas Cecil, 1st Earl of Exeter. Their only child, Anthony, died September 1634, aged 14.
2. During January 1625, to Anne Ashburnham (c. 1605–1628), third daughter of Sir John Ashburnham of Ashburnham, Sussex, by Elizabeth (later created Lady Cramond), daughter of Sir Thomas Beaumont of Stoughton Grange, Leicestershire. Anne was the mother of Sir Edward Dering, 2nd Baronet; she died aged 23 and was buried on 17 April 1628.
3. On 16 July 1629, at St Dionis Backchurch, to Unton Gibbes (died 1676), daughter of Sir Ralph Gibbes, 1st Baronet of Honington, Warwickshire, by Gertrude, daughter of Sir Thomas Wroughton of Wiltshire. They had further issue.

He was buried at St Nicholas' Church, Pluckley.

== Published works ==
Dering's published works are:

1. The Four Cardinal Virtues of a Carmelite Friar, 1641.
2. Four Speeches made by Sir E. Dering, 1641 (the pamphlet thus headed contains only three speeches, the fourth being published separately).
3. A most worthy Speech ... concerning the Liturgy, 1642.
4. A Collection of Speeches made by Sir E. Dering on Matters of Religion, 1642.
5. A Declaration by Sir E. Dering, 1644
6. A Discourse of proper Sacrifice, 1644

Parliament of England
Preceded by Sir Norton Knatchbull, Bt; Sir Roger Twysden, Bt	Member of Parliament for Kent; 1640–1642; With: Sir John Colepeper	Succeeded by Sir John Colepeper; Augustine Skinner
Baronetage of England
Preceded by new creation	Baronet (of Surrenden Dering); 1627–1644	Succeeded by Edward Dering
