= Henry IV, Part 1 =

Play by Shakespeare

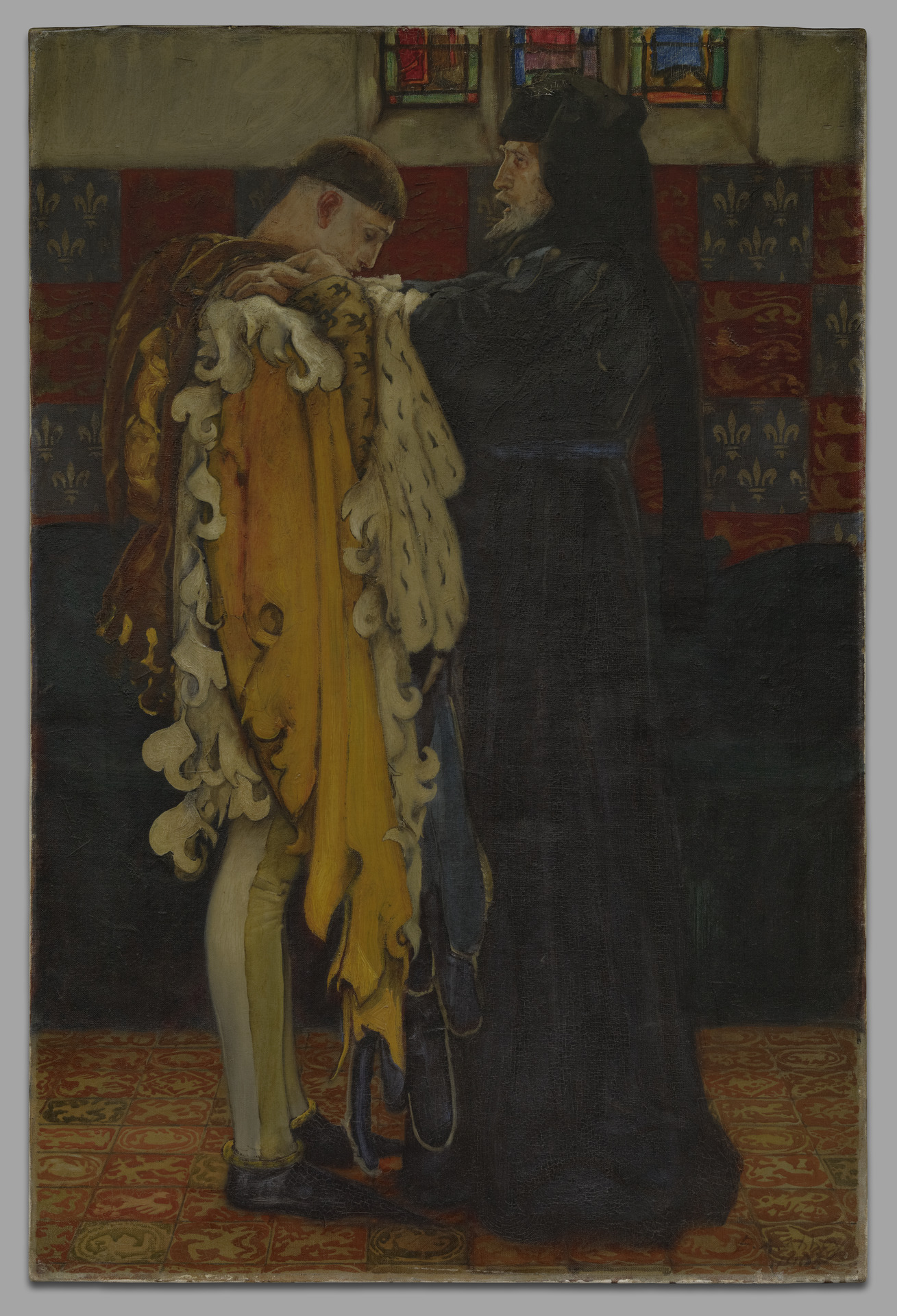
King Henry IV, Part I: The King to the Prince of Wales: "Thou shalt have charge and sovereign trust herein." (Act III, Scene ii), by Edwin Austin Abbey (1905)

Henry IV, Part 1 is a play by William Shakespeare, probably written in the mid-1590s and first published in quarto in 1598. It was composed in the later years of the reign of Elizabeth I, when questions of succession and political stability were prominent. Set in England in the early 1400s during the reign of Henry IV, the play depicts rebellion against the crown alongside the development of Prince Hal, the future Henry V, and examines themes of leadership and the formation of the heir apparent.

The play was among Shakespeare’s most popular works in his own time, as indicated by multiple early printings and the success of the character John Falstaff. It has remained one of his most frequently performed plays, noted for its combination of political drama and comic scenes and for its treatment of leadership and public identity.

== Characters ==
Of the King's party

- King Henry the Fourth – King of England.
- Henry, Prince of Wales (nicknamed "Prince Hal" or "Harry") – eldest son of Henry IV
- John of Lancaster – represented in the play as the King's second son, although he was actually the third
- Ralph Neville, Earl of Westmorland - the King's brother-in-law
- Sir Walter Blount ("Blunt")

Eastcheap

- Sir John Falstaff – a knight and friend of Prince Hal's
- Ned Poins
- Bardolph
- Peto
- Mistress Quickly – hostess of the Boar's Head Tavern
- Francis – tapster
- Vintner – tavern keeper
- Gadshill
- Two Carriers (Mugs and Tom)
- Ostler

Rebels

- Henry Percy, Earl of Northumberland
- Thomas Percy, Earl of Worcester – Northumberland's brother
- Harry Percy (nicknamed "Hotspur") – Northumberland's son
- Edmund Mortimer – Hotspur's brother-in-law and Glendower's son-in-law
- Owen Glendower – leader of the Welsh rebels
- Archibald, Earl of Douglas – leader of the Scottish rebels
- Sir Richard Vernon, 8th Baron of Shipbrook
- Richard le Scrope ("Scroop"), Archbishop of York
- Sir Michael – a friend to the Archbishop of York
- Lady Percy ("Kate", though her real name was Elizabeth) – Hotspur's wife and Mortimer's sister
- Lady Mortimer (Catrin) – Glendower's daughter and Mortimer's wife

Other Characters

- Chamberlain
- Sheriff
- Travellers
- Servant to Hotspur
- Lords, Officers, Drawers, Messengers, and Attendants

Mentioned only

- Robin Ostler, deceased character who preceded the current Ostler, concerned with the price of oats
- Gilliams, courier sent by Hotspur

== Synopsis ==
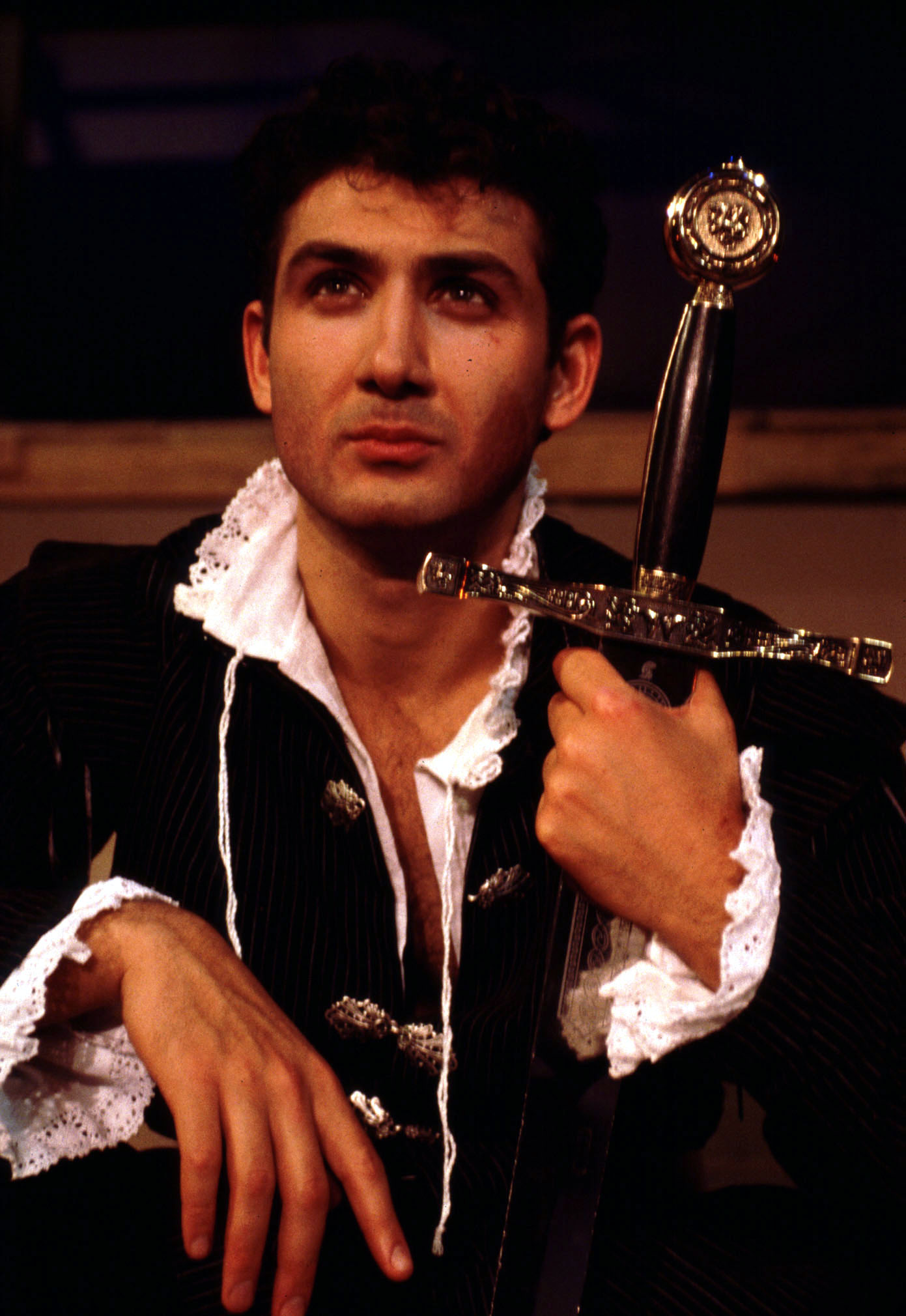
John Farmanesh-Bocca as Prince Hal in the Carmel Shakespeare Festival production of Henry IV, Part 1 in 2002

The play follows three groups of characters who initially interact only indirectly. These groups grow closer as the play progresses, coming together at the climax during the Battle of Shrewsbury. The first is centred around King Henry IV and his immediate council, who contrive to suppress a growing rebellion. The second is the group of rebel lords, led by Thomas Percy, Earl of Worcester, and including his brother, the Earl of Northumberland, and energetic nephew, Harry Percy ("Hotspur"). The Scottish Earl of Douglas, the Welshman Owen Glendower, and Edmund Mortimer also join. The third group, the comic centre of the play, consists of the young Prince Hal (King Henry's eldest son) and his companions, Falstaff, Poins, Bardolph, and Peto.

From the play's outset, Henry IV's reign is beset by problems: His personal disquiet at having usurped the throne from Richard II would be solved by a crusade to the Holy Land, but trouble on his borders with Scotland and Wales make such an act impossible. Moreover, he is increasingly at odds with the Percy family, who helped him to his throne, and with Edmund Mortimer, Richard II's chosen heir.

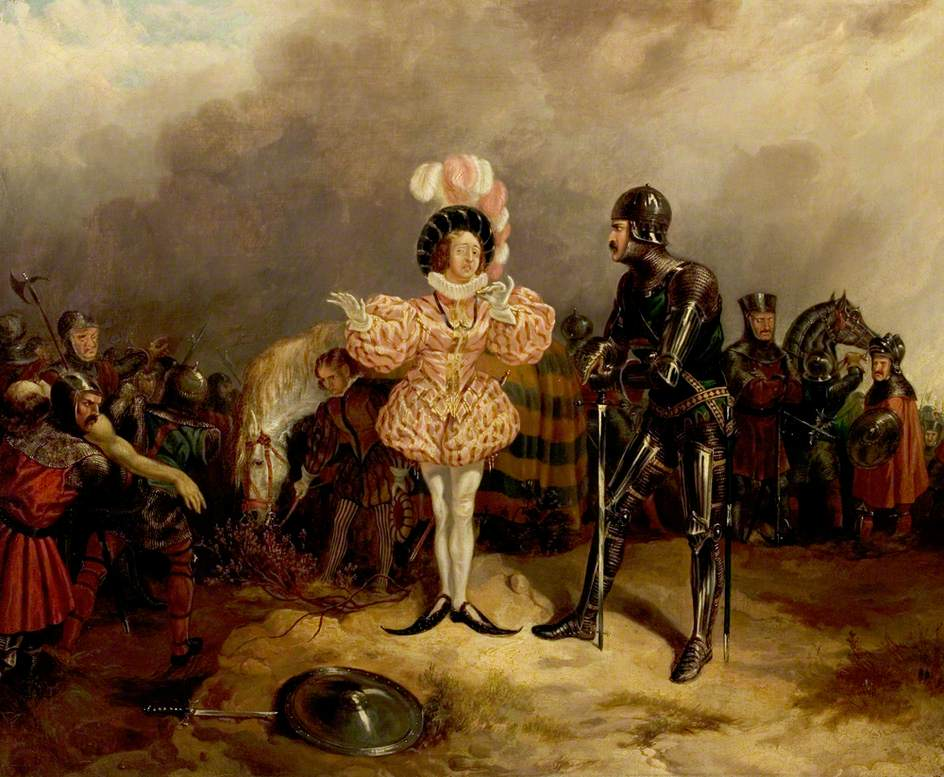
"Henry IV", Part I, Act I, Scene 3, Hotspur and the Fop, by Samuel John Egbert Jones (1828)

King Henry is also troubled by the behaviour of his eldest son and heir, Hal (the future Henry V). Hal spends little time in the royal court, preferring instead to drink in taverns with lowborn and dishonourable companions. This makes him an object of scorn to the nobles and jeopardises his legitimacy as heir; early in the play, King Henry laments that he can "See riot and dishonour stain the brow of young Harry." Hal's chief friend is Sir John Falstaff, a cowardly, drunken, but quick-witted knight whose charisma and zest for life captivate the Prince.

In the first act, the political action of the play is set in motion. King Henry and Hotspur fall out after a disagreement over the treatment of hostages: Hotspur withholds, against the King's orders, hostages taken in recent action against the Scots at the Battle of Homildon Hill, while King Henry refuses to pay Owen Glendower (a Welsh rebel) the ransom for Hotspur's brother-in-law, Edmund Mortimer. This disagreement, and the King's harsh treatment of the House of Percy generally, drives them to ally with Welsh and Scot rebels, resolving to depose "this ingrate and cankered Bolingbroke."

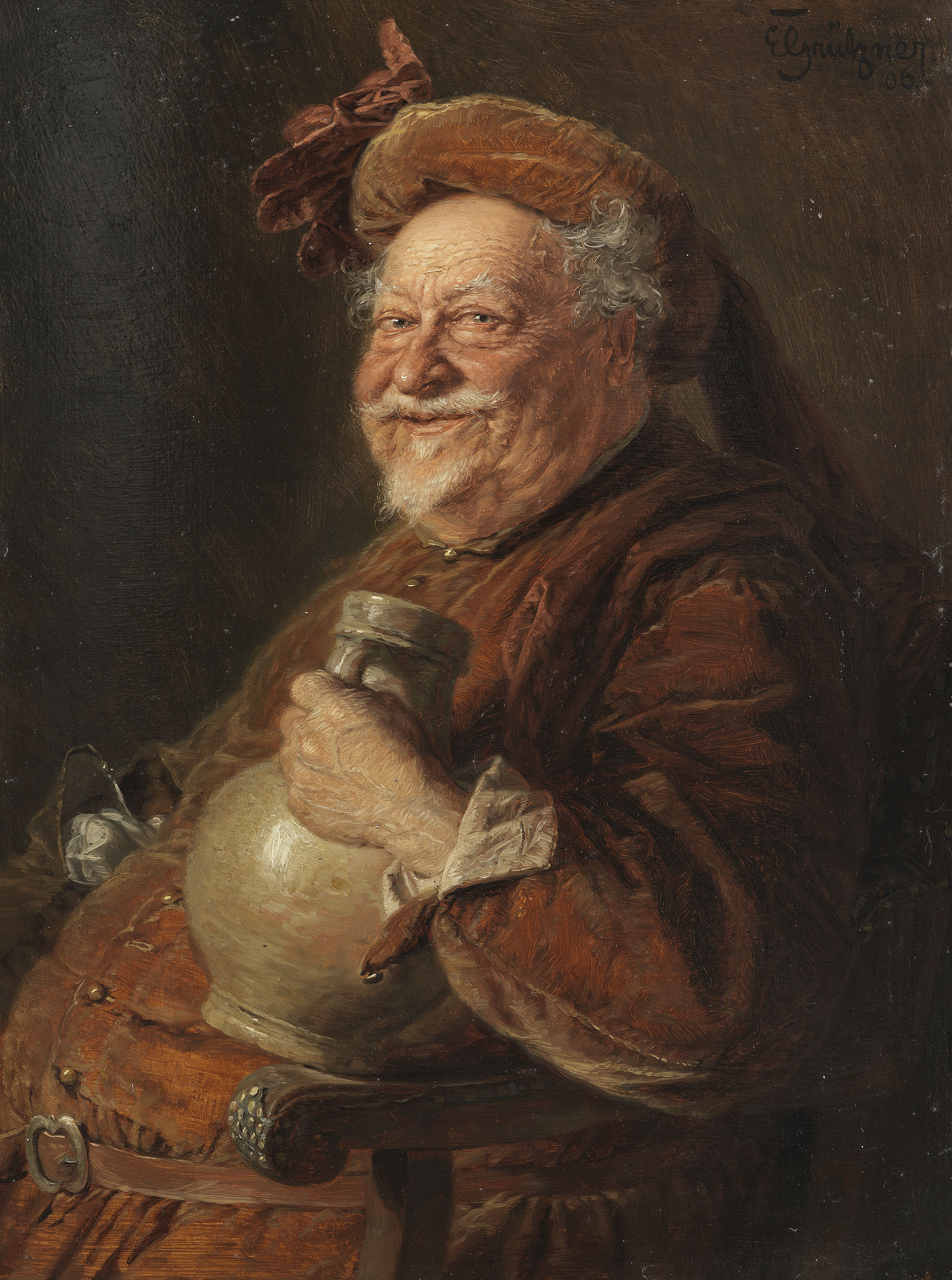
Falstaff by Eduard von Grützner (1906)

Meanwhile, Hal meets with Falstaff and his associates at the Boar's Head Tavern. Falstaff and Hal are close, but Hal enjoys insulting Falstaff, and, in a soliloquy, makes it clear that he does not plan to continue in his present lifestyle forever: Hal aims to re-assume his high place in court by proving himself to his father. Indeed, Hal reasons that by suddenly changing his ways he will be even more popular among the nobility than if he had behaved conventionally all his life. Nevertheless, he is happy to carry out a plot against Falstaff: after performing a highway robbery, Hal and Poins will slip away from Falstaff, disguise themselves, and rob Falstaff, purely for the fun of hearing the older man lie about it later, after which Hal will return the stolen money. The plot is carried out successfully.

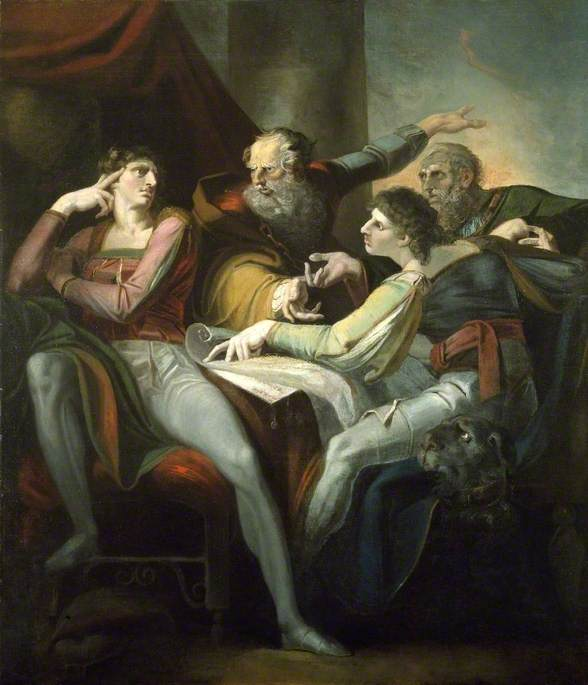
Dispute between Hotspur, Glendower, Mortimer and Worcester (from William Shakespeare's 'Henry IV Part I') by Henry Fuseli (1784)

As the revolt of Mortimer and the House of Percy grows, the Prince makes up with his father and is given the command of an army. He vows to fight and kill the rebel Hotspur, and orders Falstaff to recruit and lead a group of foot soldiers. Falstaff uses the appointment to enrich himself by taking bribes from those who do not want to be pressed into service, and, in the end, recruits only the very poor, whose wages he withholds.

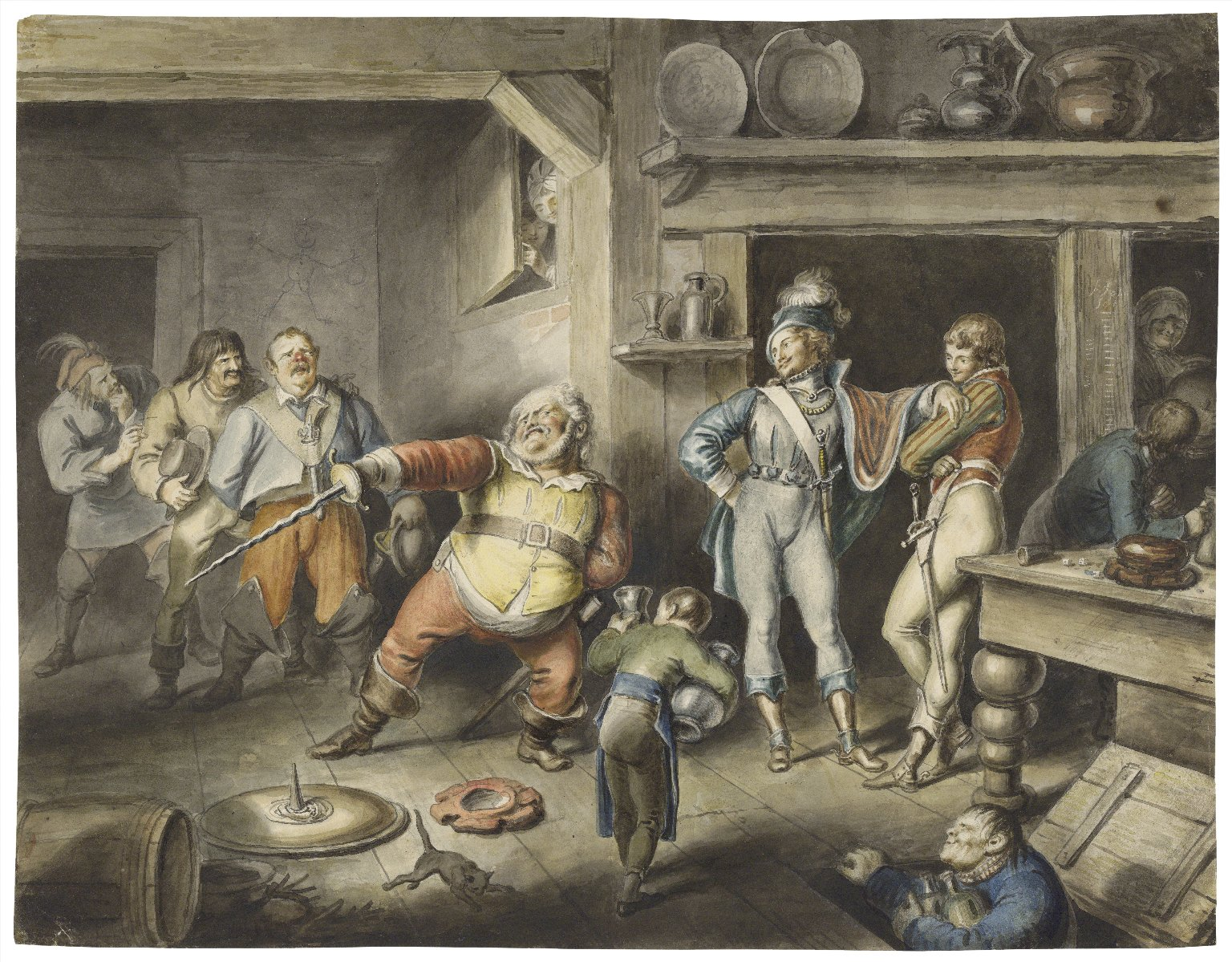
An 1829 watercolour by Johann Heinrich Ramberg of Act II, Scene iv: Falstaff enacts the part of the king.

All the parties meet at the Battle of Shrewsbury, a crucial moment for all involved: if the rebels are not defeated outright, they will gain a considerable advantage; other forces (under Northumberland, Glendower, Mortimer, and the Archbishop of York) can be called upon in the event of a stalemate or a victory for the rebels. Though Henry outnumbers the rebels, Hotspur, wild and skilled in battle, leads the opposing army personally. As the battle drags on, the king is hunted by Douglas. Prince Hal and Hotspur duel, and, in an important moment of noble virtue for the young prince, Hal prevails, killing Hotspur in single combat.

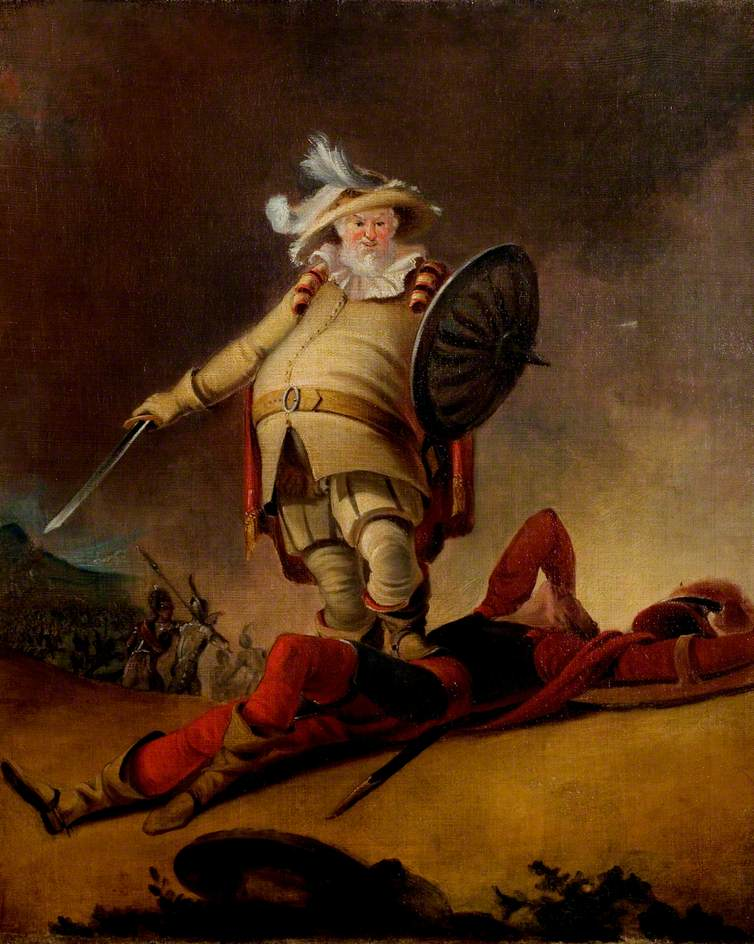
"Henry IV", Part I, Act V, Scene 4, Falstaff and the Dead Body of Hotspur, Robert Smirke (n.d.)

Left on his own during Hal's battle with Hotspur, Falstaff dishonourably feigns death to avoid an attack by Douglas. After Hal leaves Hotspur's body on the field, Falstaff revives in a mock miracle. Seeing he is alone, he stabs Hotspur's corpse in the thigh and claims credit for the kill. Hal allows Falstaff to claim the honour of the kill. Soon after Hal's generous gesture, Falstaff states that he wants to amend his life and begin "to live cleanly as a nobleman should do".

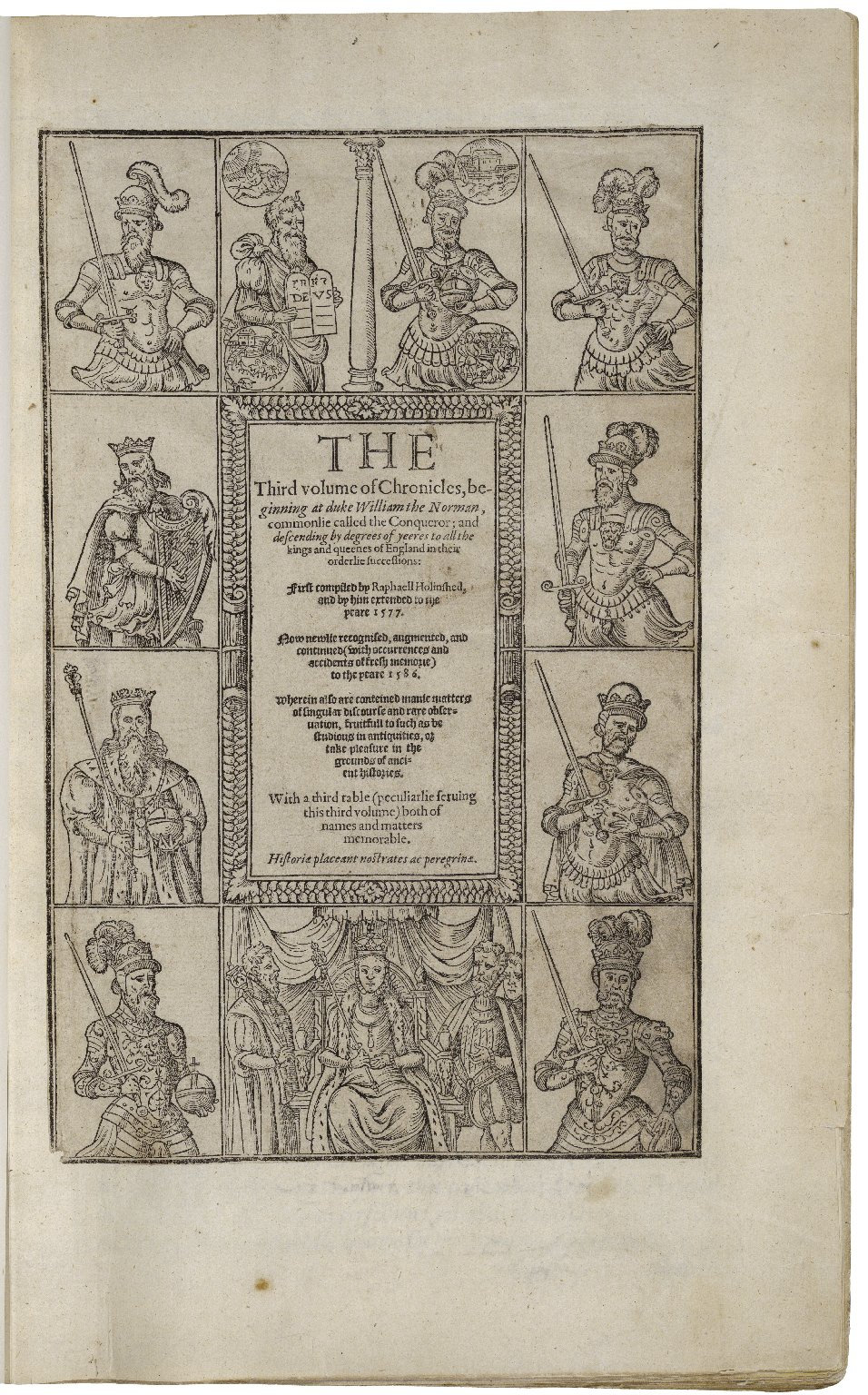
The second edition of Raphael Holinshed's Chronicles of England, Scotlande, and Irelande, printed in 1587

The play ends at Shrewsbury, after the battle. The loss of Hotspur and the fight has dealt a serious blow to the rebel cause. King Henry is pleased with the outcome, not least because it gives him a chance to execute Thomas Percy, the Earl of Worcester, one of his chief enemies (though previously one of his greatest friends). Meanwhile, Hal demonstrates his mercy by ordering Douglas—now a prisoner of war—to be released without ransom. However, the rebellion continues, now led by the Archbishop of York and the Earl of Northumberland. This inconclusive ending sets the stage for Henry IV, Part 2.

== Sources ==
Shakespeare's primary source for Henry IV, Part 1, as for most of his chronicle histories, was the second edition (1587) of Raphael Holinshed's Chronicles, which in turn drew on Edward Hall's The Union of the Two Illustrious Families of Lancaster and York. Scholars have also assumed that Shakespeare was familiar with Samuel Daniel's poem on the civil wars. Another source for this (and the following Henry plays) is the anonymous The Famous Victories of Henry V.

== Date and text ==
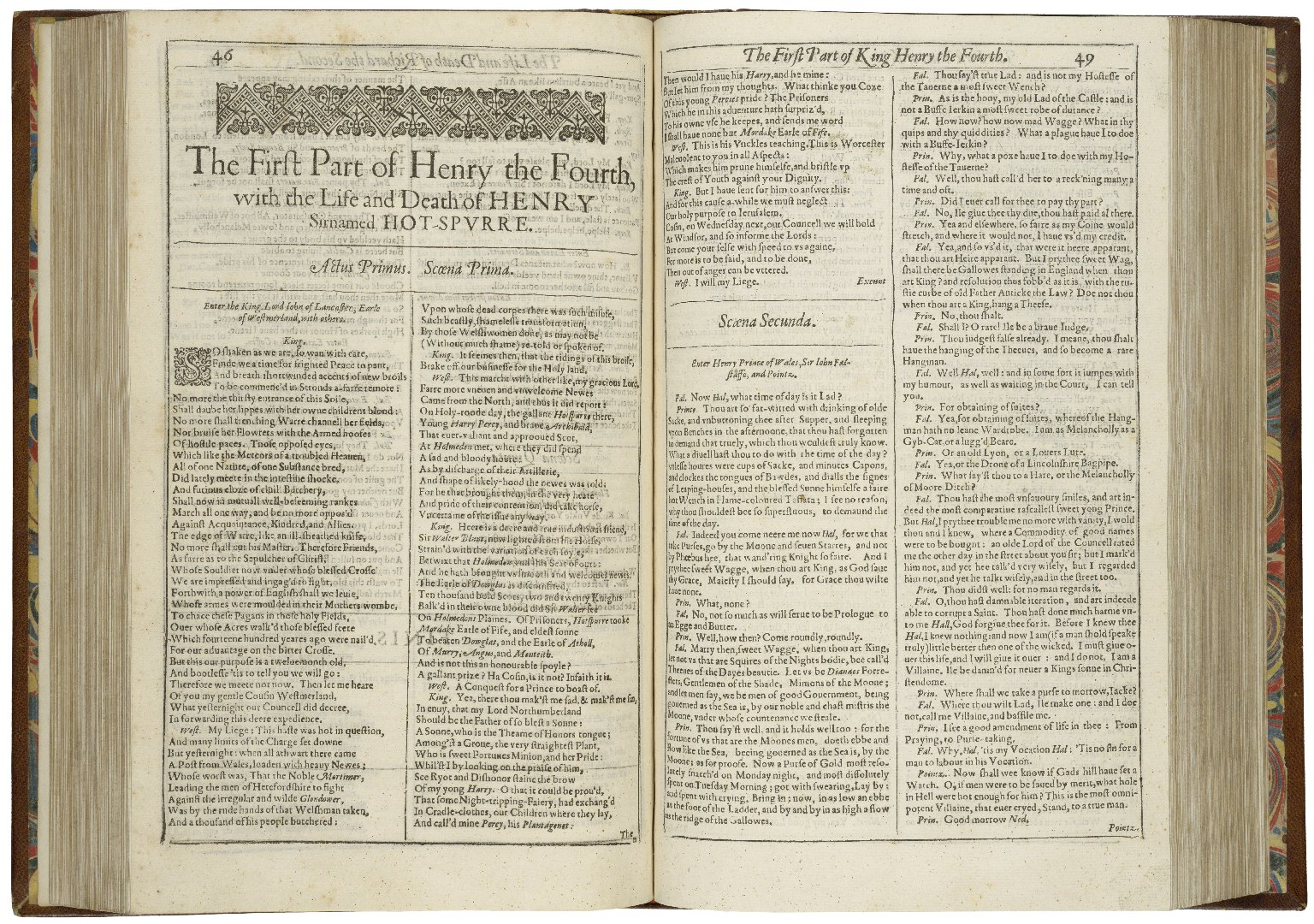
The first page of Henry the Fourth, Part I, printed in the First Folio of 1623

1 Henry IV was almost certainly in performance by 1597, given the wealth of allusions and references to the Falstaff character. The earliest recorded performance occurred on the afternoon of 6 March 1600, when the play was acted at court before the Flemish Ambassador. Other court performances followed in 1612 and 1625.

The play was entered into the Register of the Stationers Company on 25 Feb. 1598 and first printed in quarto later that year by stationer Andrew Wise. The play was Shakespeare's most popular printed text: new editions appeared in 1599, 1604, 1608, 1613, 1622, 1632, 1639, and 1692.

=== The Dering Manuscript ===
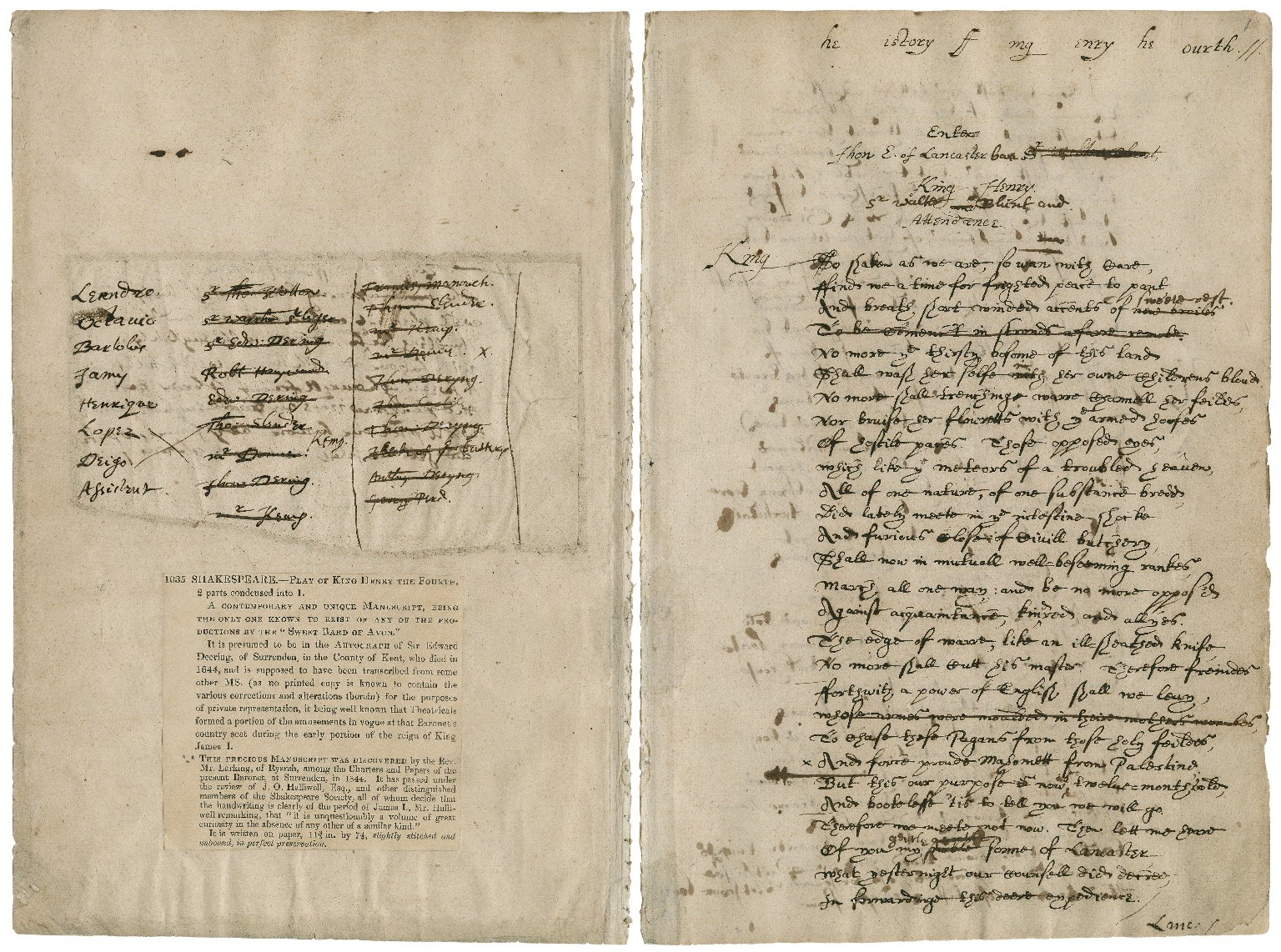
The Dering Manuscript in the Folger Shakespeare Library, Washington, D.C.

The Dering Manuscript, the earliest extant manuscript text of any Shakespeare play, provides a single-play version of both Part 1 and Part 2 of Henry IV. The consensus of Shakespeare scholars is that the Dering Manuscript represents a redaction prepared around 1623, perhaps for family or amateur theatrics, by Edward Dering (1598–1644), of Surrenden Manor, Pluckley, Kent, where the manuscript was discovered. A few dissenters have argued that the Dering MS. may indicate that Shakespeare's Henry IV was originally a single play, which the poet later expanded into two parts to capitalise on the popularity of the Sir John Falstaff character. The Dering MS. is part of the collection of the Folger Shakespeare Library in Washington, D.C.

== Criticism and analysis ==
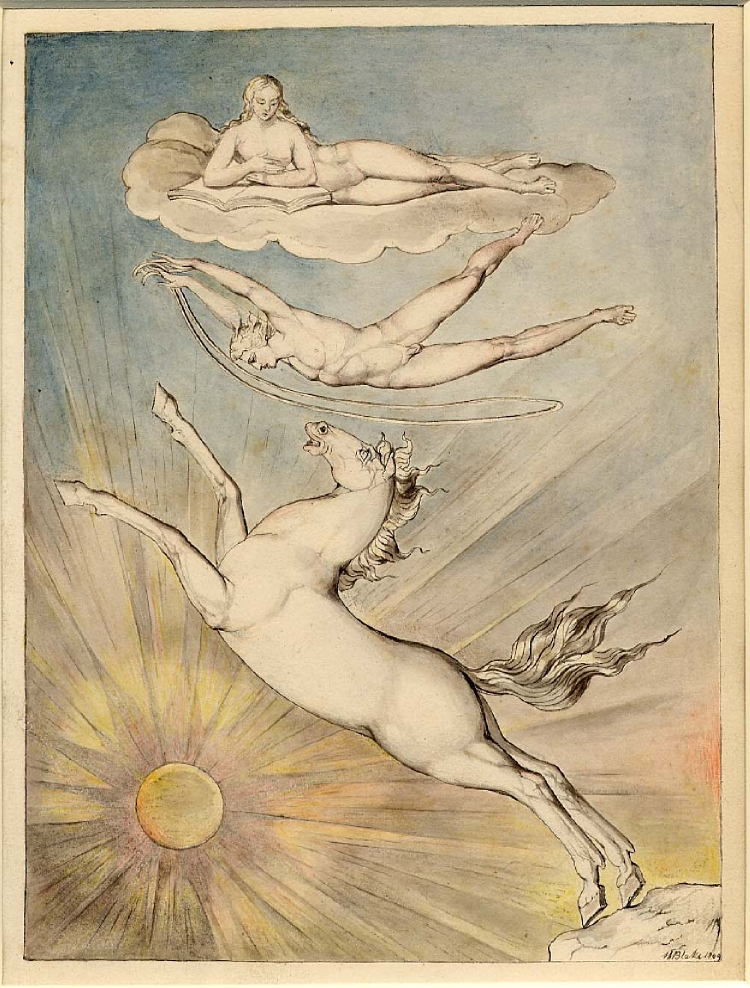
"Rise from the ground like feathered Mercury/ And vaulted with such ease into his seat/ As if an angel dropped down from the clouds/ To turn and wind a fiery Pegasus/ And witch the world with noble horsemanship." Act IV, Scene i, Hal's transformation, William Blake 1809

Henry IV, Part 1 is the first of Shakespeare's two history plays that deal with the reign of Henry IV (the other being Henry IV, Part 2), and the second play in the Henriad, a modern designation for the tetralogy of plays that deal with the successive reigns of Richard II, Henry IV, and Henry V.

=== Themes and interpretations ===
At its first publication in 1597 or 1598, the play was titled The History of Henrie the Fourth, and its title page advertised only the presence of Henry Percy and the comic Sir John Falstaff; Prince Hal was not mentioned. Indeed, throughout most of the play's performance history, Hal has been staged as a secondary figure, and popular actors, beginning with James Quin and David Garrick, often preferred to play Hotspur. It was only in the twentieth century that readers and performers began to see the central interest as the coming-of-age story of Hal, who is now seen as the starring role.

In the "coming-of-age" interpretation, Hal's acquaintance with Falstaff and the tavern lowlife humanises him and provides him with a more complete view of life. At the outset, Prince Hal seems to pale in comparison with the fiery Henry Percy, the young noble lord of the North (whom Shakespeare portrays as considerably younger than he was in history in order to provide a foil for Hal). Many readers interpret the history as a tale of Prince Hal growing up, evolving into King Henry V, in what is a tale of the prodigal son adapted to the politics of medieval England. The low proportion of scenes featuring the title character, the king, has also been noted, with some authors suggesting that the play contrasts the authority of Henry IV, and his struggle to stay in control of the situation, with the chaotic forces of the rebels and Falstaff.

==== Honor and Falstaff's Catechism ====
A major theme in Henry IV Part 1 is the expression of honour and the intersection and contrasts between honour and war. In Act 5 scene 1, Falstaff delivers a soliloquy, scholastically referred to as Falstaff's Catechism, which asserts his pragmatic and matter-of-fact perspective on war. The soliloquy reads:

’Tis not due yet. I would be loath to pay Him before His day. What need I be so forward with Him that calls not on me? Well, ’tis no matter. Honor pricks me on. Yea, but how if honor prick me off when I come on? How then? Can honor set to a leg? No. Or an arm? No. Or take away the grief of a wound? No. Honor hath no skill in surgery, then? No. What is honor? A word. What is in that word “honor”? What is that “honor”? Air. A trim reckoning. Who hath it? He that died o’ Wednesday. Doth he feel it? No. Doth he hear it? No. ’Tis insensible, then? Yea, to the dead. But will ⌜it⌝ not live with the living? No. Why? Detraction will not suffer it. Therefore, I’ll none of it. Honor is a mere scutcheon. And so ends my catechism. (5.1.128-142)

In this soliloquy, Falstaff dismisses honour as an abstract concept that has no tangible benefits. His repetition of the word "honor" and the subsequent reduction of it to "air" underscores his cynical perspective, suggesting that honour is an empty, meaningless concept that holds no practical value. He questions whether honour can "set to a leg" or "an arm," implying that honour cannot heal wounds or restore life. This practical viewpoint starkly contrasts with the romanticised notion of honour as a noble pursuit worth dying or seriously injuring oneself for. Falstaff's rhetorical questions serve to undermine the glorification of honour in martial society, pointing out its inability to provide any real, physical benefit to those who seek it.

The passage contrasts the other views expressed in the play, and is also unique for its deviation from Falstaff's character, giving him a moment of philosophy distinct from his usual dismissive prose. Shakespeare’s intent with the soliloquy has been debated between academics. While some believe that the passage serves to juxtapose Falstaff’s pragmatic philosophy with the romantic, valour driven views of the rest of the cast, others assert that Falstaff’s catechism highlights his cowardice and can be played comedically.

Professor Clifford Davidson drew parallels between Philippe de Mornay’s 1582 treatise De la verité de la religion chrestienne, which would have already been translated into English at the time of writing Henry IV Part 1:

They that attaine to honor, are in continuali torment, spightfull or spighted, doing mischiefe, or receiving mischiefe, over-mated, or over-mating. What is this but many evils for one, and a multiplying of miseries without number, for the obtainment of one silly shadow of felicity? We will leave the residue to declamers: what are the fruits of these hellish torments, what are they? Forsooth Honor, Reputation, and Power or Authority. What is all this but winde, which cannot fill us, nor scarcely puffe us up? I shall be saluted as I goe abroad, I shall sit highest at meetings. In having these things, what have I, which a wicked man may not rather have than I? And if it be a good thing, how is it given to evill men?

De Moray’s passage and Falstaff’s catechism use similar language, both reducing honour to “air” and following a catechetical structure. As de Moray’s passage highlights the dangers of pursuing honour for reputational benefits rather than out of virtue, so Shakespeare uses Falstaff to critique the ill-intentioned pursuit of honour in early modern England. Davidson writes, “Who will pursue the ‘shadow’ of reputation rather than the ‘body’ of virtue?” Falstaff seemingly rejects both the “body” and the “shadow,” denouncing both the virtue of honour and the praise that comes with it. However, at the end of the play, Falstaff accepts praise for Hotspur’s death, suggesting that his wisdom may in fact be a facade for pure cowardice.

In the broader context of "Henry IV, Part 1," Falstaff's soliloquy offers a counterpoint to the play's exploration of heroism and honour. His catechism challenges the audience to reconsider the true value of honour and to question the societal pressure to uphold it. Through his catechism, Falstaff juxtaposes both Hotspur’s misguided and vengeful pursuit of honour and Hal’s virtue.

=== Oldcastle controversy ===
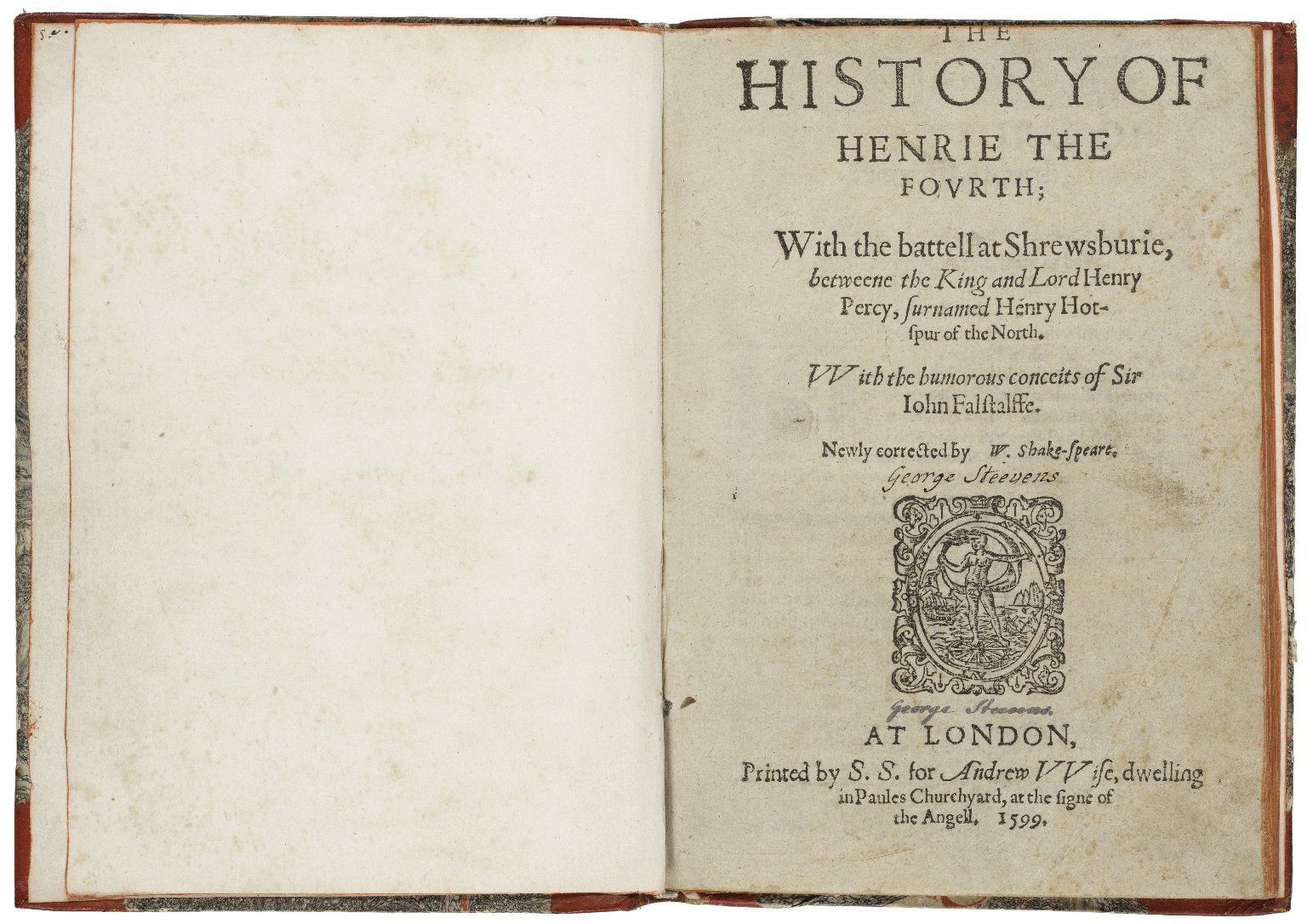
The title page from the first quarto edition of the play, printed in 1599

Henry IV, Part 1 caused controversy on its first performances in 1597, because the comic character now known as "Falstaff" was originally named "Oldcastle" and was based on John Oldcastle, a famous proto-Protestant martyr with powerful living descendants in England.

Although the character is called Falstaff in all surviving texts of the play, there is abundant external and internal evidence that he was originally called Oldcastle. The change of names is mentioned in seventeenth-century works by Richard James ("Epistle to Sir Harry Bourchier", c. 1625) and Thomas Fuller (Worthies of England, 1662). It is also indicated in detail in the early texts of Shakespeare's plays. In the quarto text of Henry IV, Part 2 (1600), one of Falstaff's speech prefixes in Act I, Scene ii is mistakenly left uncorrected, "Old." instead of "Falst." In III, ii, 25-6 of the same play, Falstaff is said to have been a "page to Thomas Mowbray, Duke of Norfolk"—a statement that is true of the historical Oldcastle. In Henry IV, Part 1, I, ii, 42, Prince Hal calls Falstaff "my old lad of the castle". An iambic pentameter verse line in Henry IV, Part 1 is irregular when using the name "Falstaff", but regular with "Oldcastle". Finally, there is the explicit disclaimer at the close of Henry IV, Part 2 that discriminates between the two figures: "for Oldcastle died [a] martyr, and this is not the man" (Epilogue, 29–32).

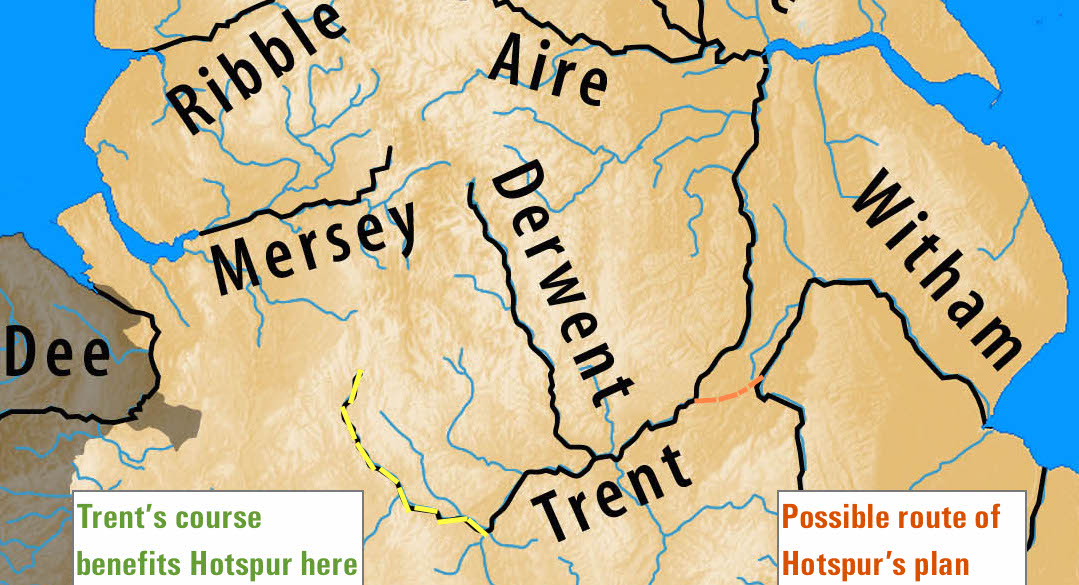
In Act III sc. 1, Hotspur, promised all of England north of the Trent, proposes diverting the river southwards to give him a still greater share. The plan highlights his destructive and argumentative nature.

There is evidence that Falstaff was originally called Oldcastle in The Merry Wives of Windsor as well, the only play (outside of the two parts Henry IV) that contains the character. When the First Folio and quarto texts of that play are compared, it appears that the joke in V.v.85–90 is that Oldcastle/Falstaff incriminates himself by calling out the first letter of his name, "O, O, O!," when his fingertips are singed with candles—which of course works for "Oldcastle" but not "Falstaff." There is also the "castle" reference in IV.v.6 of the same play.

The name change and the Epilogue disclaimer were likely required because of political pressure: the historical Oldcastle was not only a Protestant martyr but a nobleman with powerful living descendants in Elizabethan England. These were the Lords Cobham: William Brooke, 10th Baron Cobham (died 6 March 1597), Warden of the Cinque Ports (1558–97), Knight of the Order of the Garter (1584), and member of the Privy Council (1586–97); his son Henry Brooke, 11th Baron Cobham, Warden of the Cinque Ports and Knight of the Order of the Garter; and Frances Brooke, the 10th Baron's wife, and 11th Baron's mother, a close personal favourite of Queen Elizabeth I.

The elder Lord Cobham is known to have had a strongly negative impact on the lives of Shakespeare and his contemporaries in the theatre. The Lord Chamberlain's Men, the company of actors including Shakespeare that was formed in 1594, enjoyed the patronage of Henry Carey, first Lord Hunsdon, then serving as Lord Chamberlain. When Carey died on 22 July 1596, the post of Lord Chamberlain was given to William Brooke, Lord Cobham, who withdrew what official protection they had enjoyed. The players were left to the care of the local officials of the City of London, who had long wanted to drive the companies of actors out of the city. Thomas Nashe, in a contemporary letter, complained that the actors were "piteously persecuted by the Lord Mayor and the aldermen" during this period. The interval did not last; when Cobham died less than a year later, the post of Lord Chamberlain went to Henry Carey's son George, 2nd baron Hunsdon, and the actors regained their previous patronage.

The name was changed to "Falstaff", based on Sir John Fastolf, a historical person with a reputation for cowardice at the Battle of Patay, whom Shakespeare had previously represented in Henry VI, Part 1. Fastolf had died without descendants, making him safe for a playwright's use.

Shortly afterward, a team of playwrights wrote a two-part play entitled Sir John Oldcastle, which presents a heroic dramatisation of Oldcastle's life and was published in 1600.

In 1986, the Oxford Shakespeare edition of Shakespeare's works rendered the character's name as Oldcastle, rather than Falstaff, in Henry IV, Part 1 (although not, confusingly, in Part 2), as a consequence of the editors' aim to present the plays as they would have appeared during their original performances. No other published editions have followed suit.

== Adaptations ==
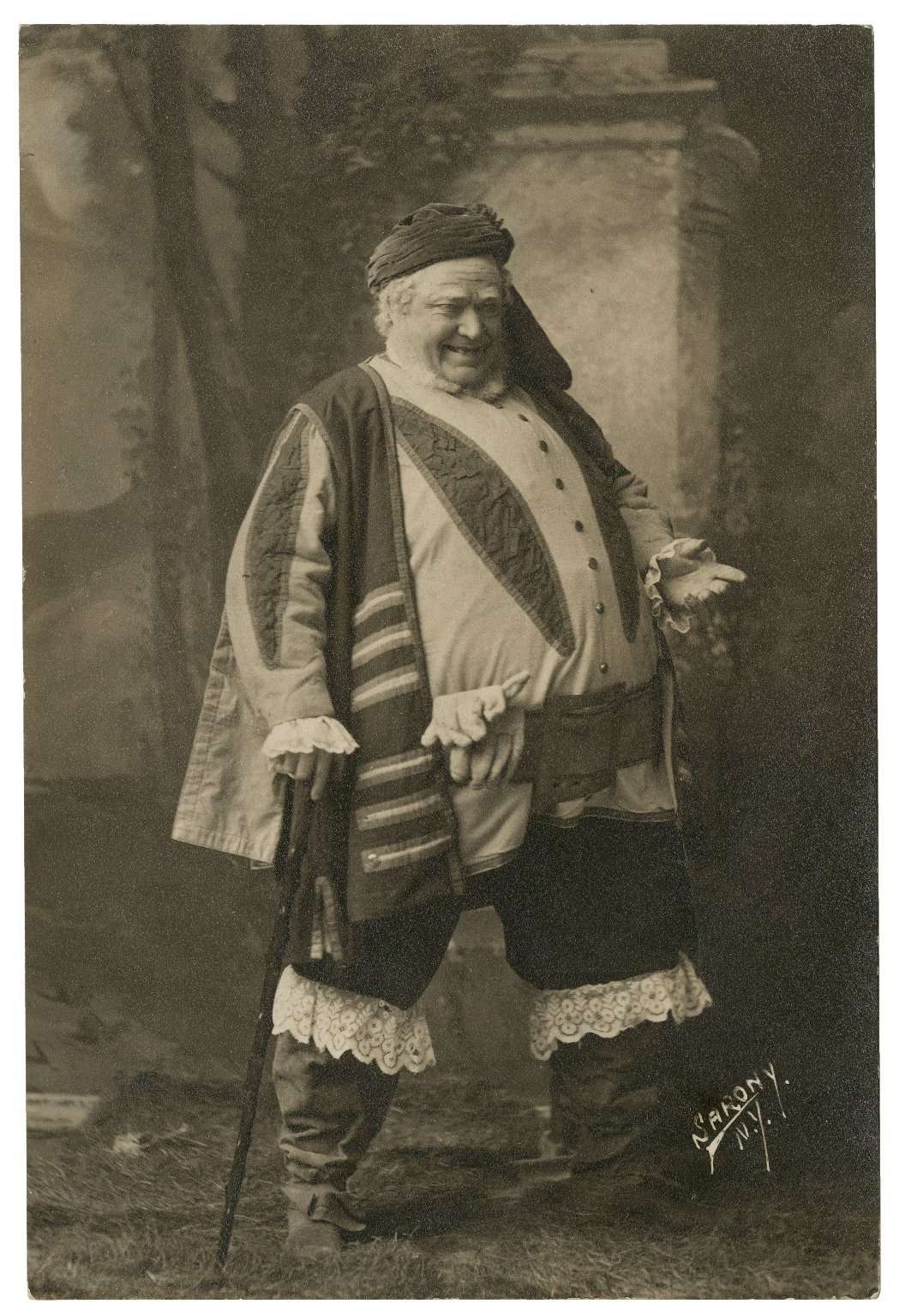
A photograph of John Jack as Falstaff in a late 19th-century performance of the play

There have been three BBC television films of Henry IV, Part 1. In the 1960 mini-series An Age of Kings, Tom Fleming starred as Henry IV, with Robert Hardy as Prince Hal, Frank Pettingell as Falstaff, and Sean Connery as Hotspur. The 1979 BBC Television Shakespeare version starred Jon Finch as Henry IV, David Gwillim as Prince Hal, Anthony Quayle as Falstaff, and Tim Pigott-Smith as Hotspur. In the 2012 series The Hollow Crown, Henry IV, Part 1 was directed by Richard Eyre and starred Jeremy Irons as Henry IV, Tom Hiddleston as Prince Hal, Simon Russell Beale as Falstaff and Joe Armstrong as Hotspur.

Orson Welles's Chimes at Midnight (1965) compiles the two Henry IV plays into a single, condensed storyline, while adding a handful of scenes from Henry V and dialogue from Richard II and The Merry Wives of Windsor. The film stars Welles himself as Falstaff, John Gielgud as King Henry, Keith Baxter as Hal, Margaret Rutherford as Mistress Quickly, Jeanne Moreau as Doll Tearsheet and Norman Rodway as Hotspur.

BBC Television's 1995 Henry IV also combines the two Parts into one adaptation. Ronald Pickup played the King; David Calder, Falstaff; Jonathan Firth, Hal; and Rufus Sewell, Hotspur.

Adapted scenes in flashback from Henry IV are included in the 1989 film version of Henry V (1989) with Robbie Coltrane portraying Sir John Falstaff and Kenneth Branagh playing the young Prince Hal.

Gus Van Sant's 1991 film My Own Private Idaho is loosely based on Part 1 of Henry IV, as well as Henry IV, Part 2 and Henry V.

The one-man hip-hop musical Clay is loosely based on Henry IV.

In 2014, playwright and actor Herbert Sigüenza adapted the play to El Henry, a post-apocalyptic Chicano gang version set in "the year 2045, and to a place identified as 'Aztlan City, Aztlan. Formerly San Diego.'"

In 2015, The Michigan Shakespeare Festival produced an award-winning combined production—directed and adapted by Janice L. Blixt—of the two plays focusing on the relationship between Henry IV and Prince Hal.

In 2016, Graham Abbey combined Richard II and Henry IV, Part 1 into a single play called Breath of Kings: Rebellion. Henry IV, Part II and Henry V together became Breath of Kings: Redemption. Both adaptations were staged at the Stratford Festival in Stratford, Ontario. Abbey, in the productions, played Henry IV (Bolingbroke).

The 2016 app Cycle of Kings features the entire play Henry IV, Part 1 in interactive form, as well as a modern English translation.

In 2019, Netflix released the film The King, an adaptation of the play directed by David Michôd and starring Timothée Chalamet, Robert Pattinson and Joel Edgerton.

Abigail Thorn's 2022 play The Prince is loosely based on Henry IV, Part 1.

In spring 2024, Robert Icke adapted and directed the play (along with Henry IV, Part II) into a new version called Player Kings which starred Ian McKellen as John Falstaff, Toheeb Jimoh as Hal and Richard Coyle as King Henry IV. The production ran at the Noël Coward Theatre, in London's West End before going on a UK tour.

== Legacy ==
The famous Sherlock Holmes catchphrase "The game is afoot" is taken from Act I, Scene 3, line 615, where the Earl of Northumberland says: "Before the game is afoot, thou still let'st slip."

The phrase was also later used by Shakespeare in Henry V, Act III, Scene 1, by the title character:

"I see you stand like greyhounds in the slips,
Straining upon the start. The game's afoot:
Follow your spirit, and upon this charge
Cry 'God for Harry, England, and Saint George!'"

== See also ==
- List of idioms attributed to Shakespeare
