= Dering Manuscript =

17th-century Shakespeare manuscript

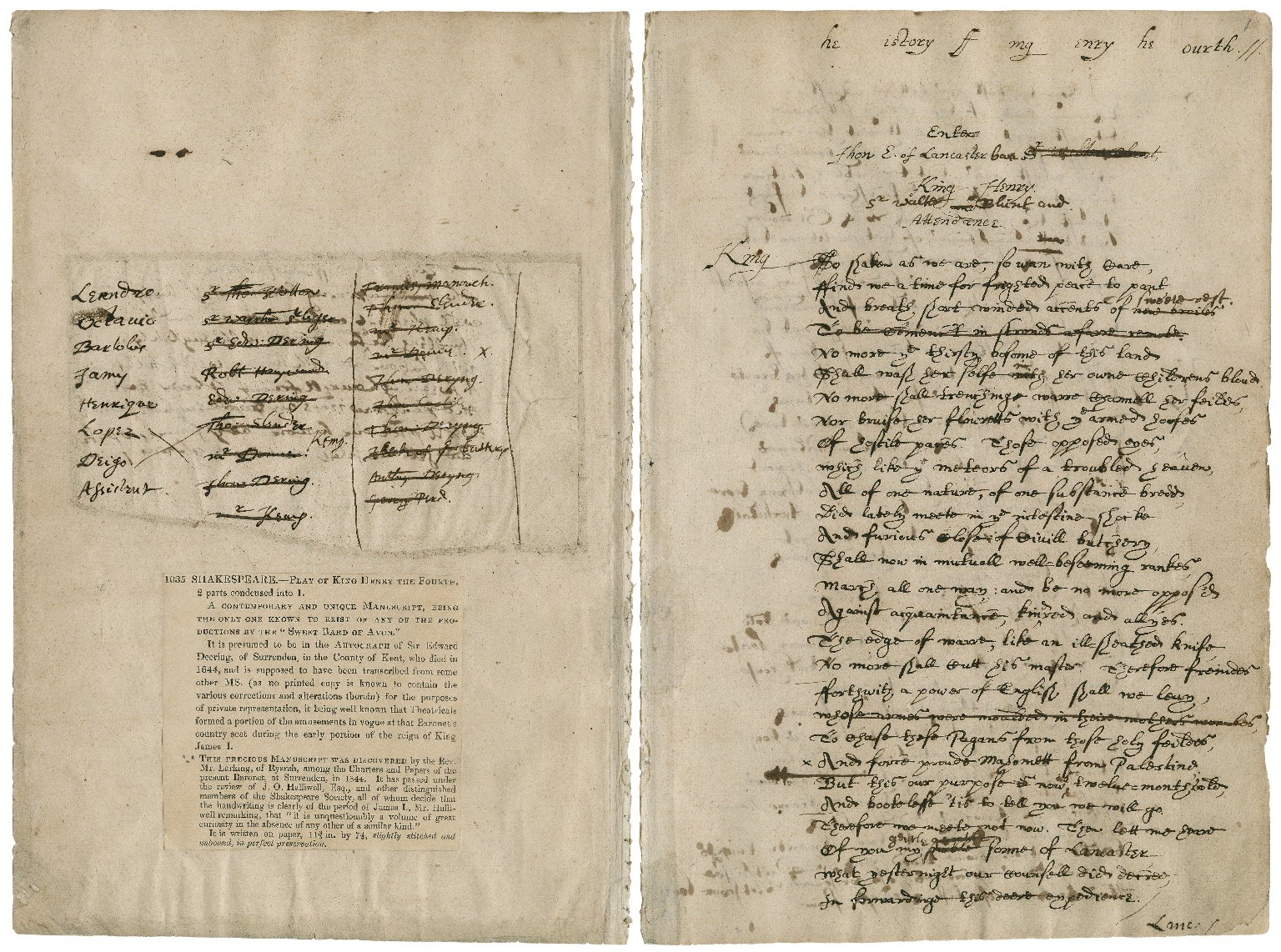
The Dering Manuscript

The Dering Manuscript is the earliest extant manuscript text of any play by William Shakespeare. The manuscript combines Part 1 and Part 2 of Henry IV into a single-play redaction. Scholarly consensus indicates that the manuscript was revised in the early 17th century by Sir Edward Dering, a man known for his interest in literature and theater. Dering prepared his redaction for an amateur performance starring friends and family at Surrenden Manor in Pluckley, Kent, where the manuscript was discovered in 1844. This is the earliest known instance of an amateur production of Shakespeare in England. Sourced from the 1613 fifth quarto of Part 1 and the 1600 first quarto of Part 2, the Dering Manuscript contains many textual differences from published quarto and folio editions of the plays. Dering cut nearly 3,000 lines of Shakespearean text (including significant abridgment of the character of Falstaff) and added some 50 lines of his own invention along with numerous minor interventions. The Dering Manuscript is currently a part of the collection at the Folger Shakespeare Library in Washington, DC (Folger MS V.b.34).

== Description ==
=== Bibliography ===
The Dering Manuscript is a small folio (11.75 in x 7.75 in) of 55 extant leaves, composed of two large quires with six cancel leaves interposed in between. The six cancels come from different stock paper than the main quires. They are wider, cut more irregularly and slightly shorter at the spine than the main quires. Such differences suggest that these six leaves were inserted after the completion of the two main quires. The first and second quires correspond to Part 1 and Part 2 of Henry IV respectively, and the six cancel leaves in between contain transitional scenes that Dering reworked after the manuscript's initial preparation.

Two hands contributed to the composition of the Dering Manuscript, known as Hand I and Hand II. Hand I wrote page one of the manuscript and attached an eight line addition to the first scene on a piece of scrap paper. Hand II completed the remainder of the text. The manuscript also displays numerous modifications and corrections of Hand II's work by Hand I. Stylistic differences between the two show that Hand I was an unprofessional hand, but Hand II belonged to a professional scribe. Hand I has been identified as that of Edward Dering, who began to compile a redacted version based on the quarto editions he owned before contracting the work out to a professional scribe. Hand II, therefore, belongs to the scribe, a man named Samuel Carington, who appears in Dering's "Booke of Expenses" in early 1623 for "writing oute the play of Henry the fourth". After outsourcing the transcription to Carington, Dering went through the text again and re-revised.

=== Text ===
Dering's source text for sections of the manuscript based on Part 1 was the fifth quarto of The History of Henry IV, printed in 1613. Scholars point to the manuscript's fidelity to the punctuation of the fifth quarto and to two textual errors unique to that printing as evidence (Dering MS 3.3.80, Globe III.iii.100; Dering MS 4.2.76, Globe V.ii.76). The scenes from Part 2 are derived from the second issue of the first quarto, printed in 1600. This reasoning is substantiated by the presence of the King's soliloquy on sleep (III.i), which appears only in the second issue of the first quarto. Additionally, numerous small errors hold consistent across the two texts.

Although the manuscript spans both Henry IV Part 1 and Henry IV Part 2, the majority of Dering's version comes from Part I. Whereas only 347 out of some 2968 lines in Part 1 are missing (approximately 11%), Dering cut 2374 lines of the 3180 in Part 2 (approximately 75%). Major omissions from Part 1 include scenes II.i and VI.vi as well as several other major abridgments of longer scenes. For the purposes of his amateur performance, Dering tried to decrease the size of his cast. His cuts eliminate several characters, including two Carriers, Ostler, Gadshill, Chamberlain, the Archbishop, Sir Michael, musicians, and Westmoreland. Only four scenes remain of Part 2: Northumberland hearing of Hotspur's death, the death of the king, Hal's rebuke of Falstaff, and a comic scene between Falstaff and Mistress Quickly. Peter Holland notes that Dering's playtext "places its emphasis on Part I and turns to Part 2 only as needed to end its action".

Despite the popularity of the character Falstaff with contemporary audiences, Dering subjects him to significant abbreviation. The cuts redirect emphasis from the relationship between Falstaff and Prince Hal and the latter's maturation to the political moments of Shakespeare's text. According to Michael Dobson in an essay on the history of amateur performance, "the performances Dering and his friends gave in the hall at Surrenden must have resembled a semi-public debate about the rival claims of aggrieved peers and a dubiously legitimate monarchy".

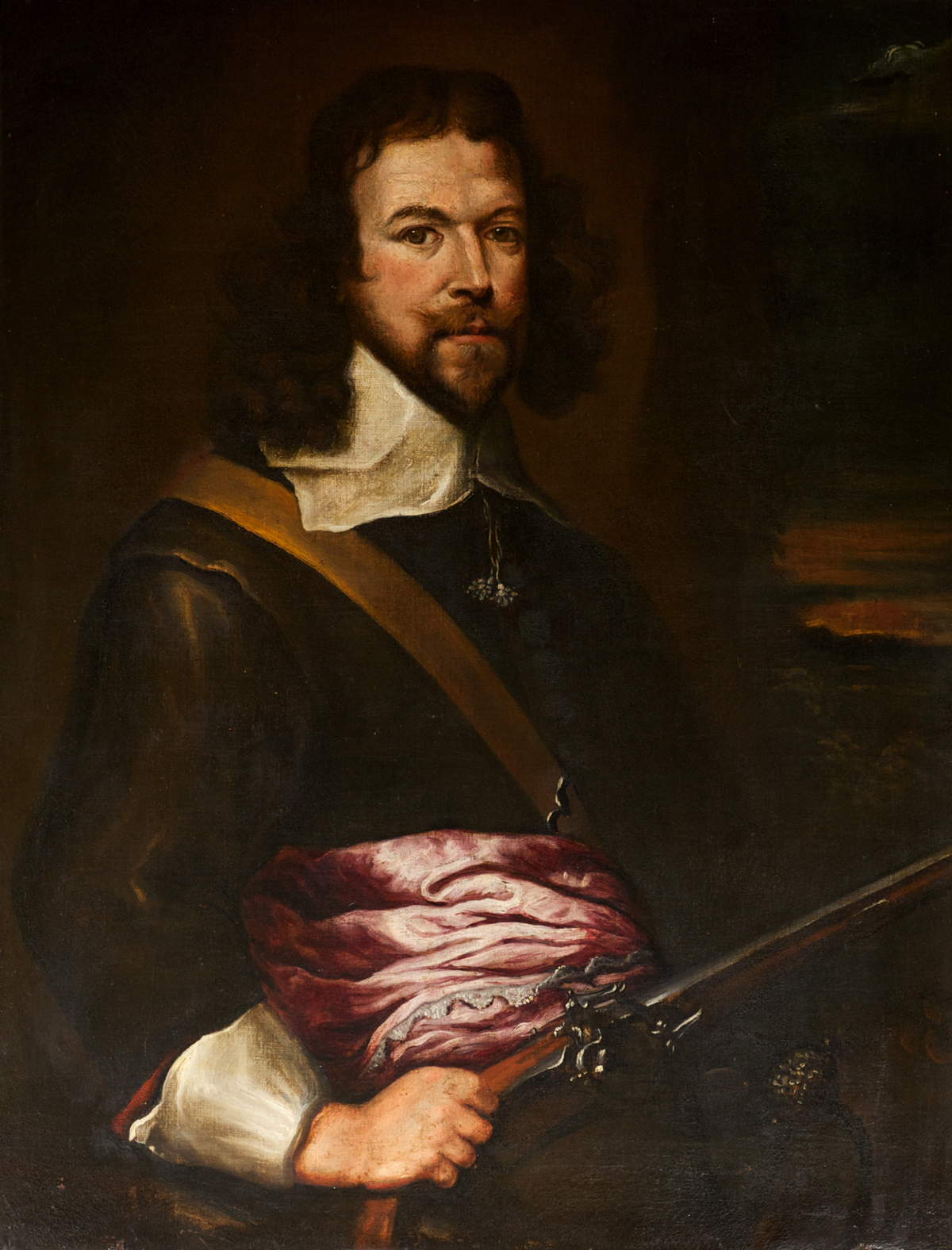
Portrait of Sir Edward Dering, 1st Baronet by William Dobson

== History and provenance ==
The Dering MS was discovered in 1844 by the Reverend Lambert B. Larkin while he researched the history of Kent in the collection of Sir Edward Dering, the 8th Baronet of Surrenden Hall, Kent. The manuscript had been stored for nearly two centuries at Surrenden Hall in a library of charters, books and manuscripts compiled by the first Sir Edward Dering (1598-1644), a man famously enthusiastic for literature, drama and book collecting (Dering boasts the earliest recorded purchase of a First Folio, in December 1623). Larkin immediately alerted the Shakespeare Society, which in 1845 published a transcription of the manuscript with an introduction by James Halliwell-Phillipps (named James Halliwell at the time of publication). Halliwell-Phillipps purchased the manuscript shortly afterwards, and in the 1860s conferred it to the collection of George Greville, 4th Earl of Warwick in the 1860s. Following the Earl's death in 1893, Henry Clay Folger purchased the manuscript in 1897. The manuscript now resides in the Folger Shakespeare Library (V.b.34) in Washington, DC.

== Dating ==
In his introduction to the original transcription of the manuscript, Halliwell-Phillips notes that the since the corrections to the manuscript were written by a hand proven to be Dering's (based on letter samples), the manuscript must date to before 1644, the year of Dering's death. More recent scholarship has pinned the date of the redaction between 1622 and 1624. A piece of scrap paper which Dering attached to the first page of the manuscript displays the cast list from another amateur performance by Dering at Surrenden Park of The Spanish Curate, a contemporary comedy by John Fletcher. The play was licensed in the Stationers' Register on 24 October 1622. Dering therefore prepared the redaction after October 1622, but before the summer of 1624, when one of the actors listed in the cast, Francis Manouch, left Kent. Since Dering's “Booke of expenses” lists the date of Samuel Carington's payment as February 27, 1623, Laetitia Yeandle asserts that Dering prepared the original redaction shortly before contracting the transcription to Carington, and then made another set of revisions to Carington's work shortly after its acquisition.
