= Clay (musical) =

2008 hip hop musical by Matt Sax

- Music: Matt Sax
- Lyrics: Matt Sax

Clay is a 2008 hip-hop musical loosely based on Shakespeare's Henry IV, Parts 1 and 2. The central character, Sir John, is based on Falstaff. It was written and performed by Matt Sax. The first performance was at the Edinburgh Festival Fringe.

== Synopsis ==
The show opens with Sir John presenting his protégé, Clay, for his first major concert. Clay shows up an hour late, blood covering his face. In an attempt to stall for time, Sir John tells the audience the story of Clay's life. Clay's real name is Clifford Keys. His father is an emotionally absent businessman, and his mother is a depressed chain-smoker. When he is seven years old, Clifford's parents decide to divorce, and his father manipulates the boy into asking to stay with his father. After missing three of Clifford's birthdays in a row, Clifford's mother commits suicide. His father quickly remarries.

Years pass, and Clifford is sixteen years old. To escape his dysfunctional family, he begins going to open-mic nights at a small bookstore. The MC is Sir John, a talented rapper whose face was deformed in a car accident and has no chance of getting signed to a record label. Clifford begins weekly hip-hop lessons with Sir John, and he begins his transformation from awkward novice to confident storyteller. When Sir John asks Clifford to rap about the girl he loves, Clifford reveals that he is in love with his stepmother, and they have slept together. Sir John begs Clifford to come live with him, but Clifford refuses.

Clifford's father returns one night to find his wife and son in bed together. He throws Clifford out of the house, and Clifford goes to live with Sir John. Three years pass, and under Sir John's wing, Clifford has become the successful rapper Clay. His song about his family life is a radio hit. On the night of his on-stage debut, Clifford's father tracks him down and reprimands him for embarrassing his family, telling him, "Your mother is rolling in her grave." In the ensuing fight, Clifford nearly kills his father, but he decides to let him go.

After Clifford recounts the fight, Sir John tell him that he is proud of Clifford for letting his father go. They get him cleaned up in time for him to come out on stage and give a triumphant debut performance.

== History ==
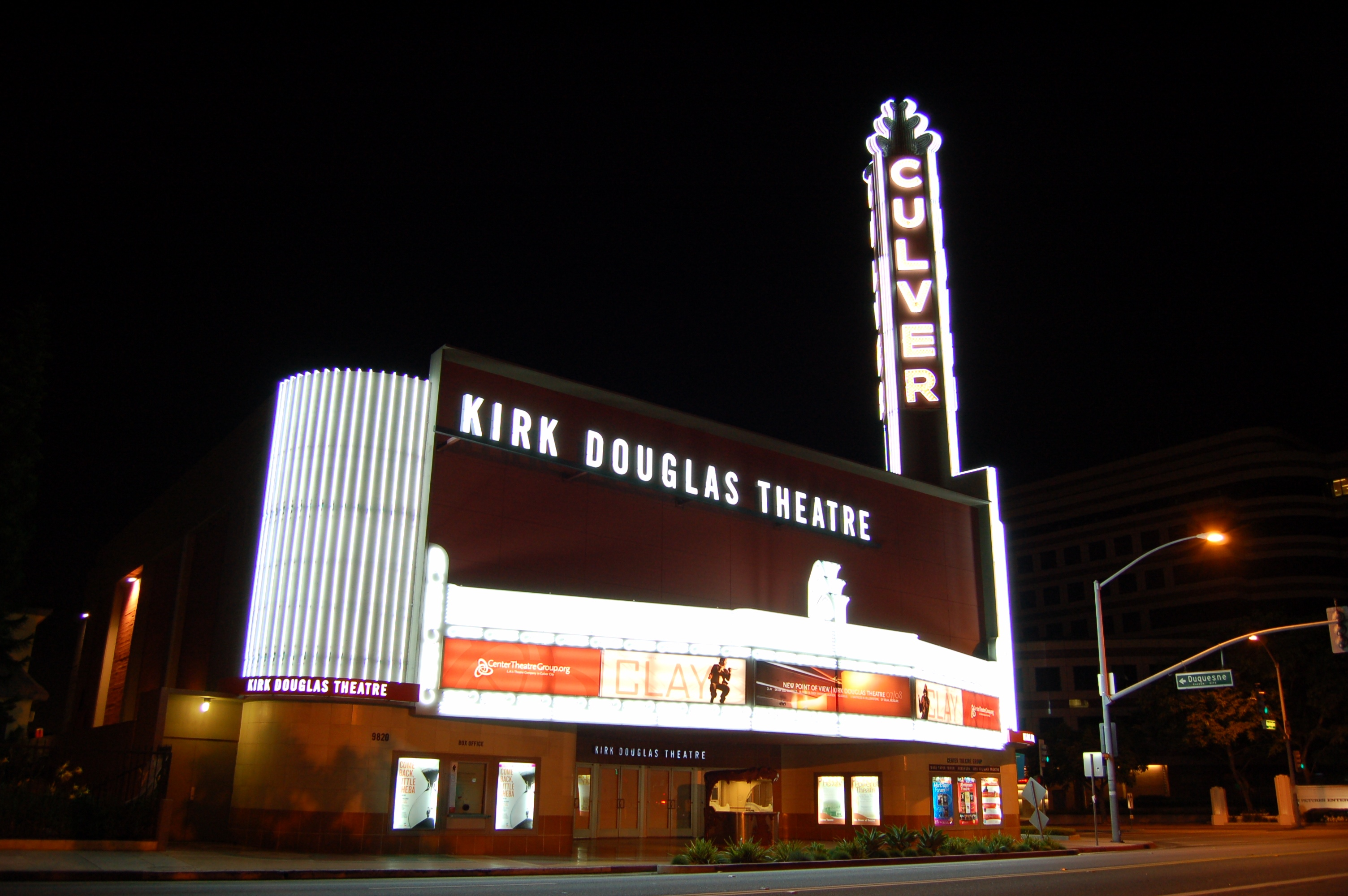
Kirk Douglas Theatre during the 2008 run of Clay.

Developed in collaboration with and directed by Eric Rosen. Joshua Horvath did sound design, orchestration, and music production.

During a short run at Northwestern University in 2004, Eric Rosen of About Face Theatre saw Clay, later sending it to an About Face production in Chicago under his direction, and later the Center Theatre Group in Los Angeles. A year later, Clay was brought to Rosen's new theatre, Kansas City Repertory Theatre, before going to the Lincoln Center in New York.
