= Spencer Fullerton Baird =

American scientist (1823 – 1887)

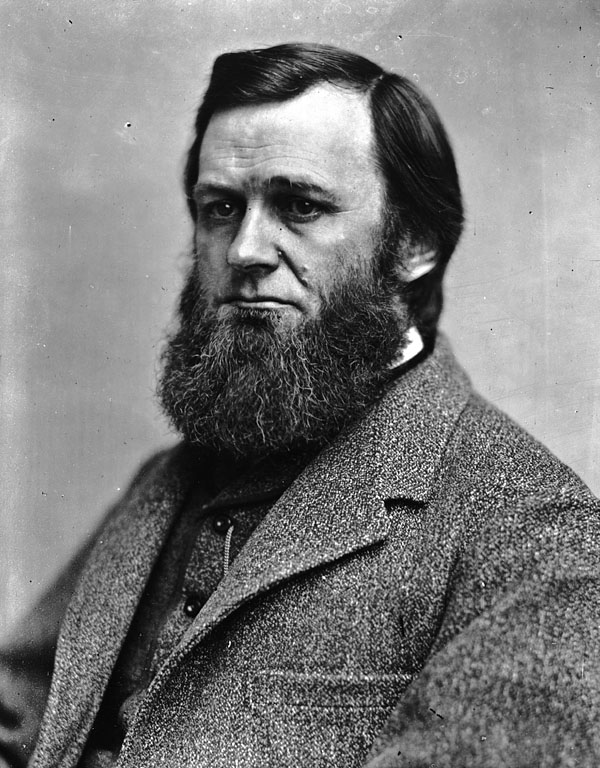
- An 1867 photo of Baird by William Bell

2nd Secretary of the Smithsonian Institution
- In office 1878–1887
- Preceded by: Joseph Henry
- Succeeded by: Samuel Pierpont Langley

1st Commissioner of Fish and Fisheries United States Commission of Fish and Fisheries
- In office 1871–1887
- Preceded by: none
- Succeeded by: George Brown Goode

Personal details
- Born: February 3, 1823 Reading, Pennsylvania, U.S.
- Died: August 19, 1887 (aged 64) Woods Hole, Massachusetts, U.S.
- Resting place: Oak Hill Cemetery; Washington, D.C., U.S.
- Education: Dickinson College; Columbia University
- Known for: Naturalist; Ornithologist; Ichthyologist; Herpetologist; Curator
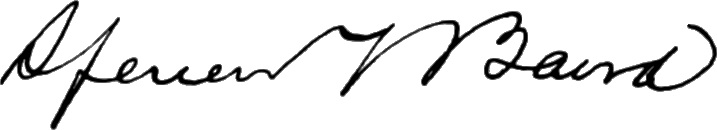
- Signature
- Author abbreviation in zoology = Baird

Spencer Fullerton Baird (/ˈbɛərd/; February 3, 1823 – August 19, 1887) was an American naturalist, ornithologist, ichthyologist, herpetologist, and museum curator. Baird was the first curator to be named at the Smithsonian Institution. He eventually served as assistant Secretary of the Smithsonian from 1850 to 1878, and as Secretary from 1878 until 1887. He was dedicated to expanding the natural history collections of the Smithsonian which he increased from 6,000 specimens in 1850 to over 2 million by the time of his death. He also served as the U.S. Commissioner of Fish and Fisheries from 1871 to 1887 and published over 1,000 works during his lifetime.

== Early life and education ==
Spencer Fullerton Baird was born in Reading, Pennsylvania in 1823. His mother was a member of the prominent Philadelphia Biddle family; he was a nephew of Speaker of the Pennsylvania Senate Charles B. Penrose and a first cousin, once removed, of U.S. Senator Boies Penrose and his distinguished brothers, Richard, Spencer, and Charles. He became a self-trained naturalist as a young man, learning about the field from his brother, William, who was a birder, and the likes of John James Audubon, who instructed Baird on how to draw scientific illustrations of birds. His father was also a big influence on Baird's interest in nature, taking Baird on walks and gardening with him. He died of cholera when Baird was ten years old. As a young boy he attended Nottingham Academy in Port Deposit, Maryland and public school in Carlisle, Pennsylvania.

Baird attended Dickinson College and earned his bachelor's and master's degrees, finishing the former in 1840. After graduation he moved to New York City with an interest in studying medicine at the Columbia University College of Physicians and Surgeons. He returned to Carlisle two years later. He taught natural history at Dickinson starting in 1845. While at Dickinson, he did research, participated in collecting trips, did specimen exchanges with other naturalists, and traveled frequently. He married Mary Helen Churchill in 1846. In 1848, their daughter, Lucy Hunter Baird, was born. He was awarded a grant, in 1848, from the Smithsonian Institution to explore bone caves and the natural history of the Philadelphia metropolitan area. In 1849 he was given $75 by the Smithsonian Institution to collect, pack, and transport specimens for them. It was during this time that he met Smithsonian Secretary Joseph Henry. The two became close friends and colleagues. Throughout the 1840s Baird traveled extensively throughout the northeastern and central United States. Often traveling by foot, Baird hiked more than 2,100 miles in 1842 alone.

== Professional career ==
=== Smithsonian Institution ===
In 1850, Baird became the first curator at the Smithsonian Institution and the Permanent Secretary for the American Association for the Advancement of Science, the latter which he served for three years. Upon his arrival in Washington, he brought two railroad box cars worth of his personal collection. Baird created a museum program for the Smithsonian, requesting that the organization focus on natural history in the United States. His program also allowed him to create a network of collectors through an exchange system. He asked that members of the Army and Navy collect rare animals and plant specimens from west of the Mississippi River and the Gulf of Mexico. In order to balance the collection, Baird sent duplicate specimens to other museums around the country, often exchanging the duplicates for specimens the Smithsonian needed. During the 1850s he described over 50 new species of reptiles, some by himself, and others with his student Charles Frédéric Girard. Their 1853 catalog of the Smithsonian's snake collection is a benchmark work in North American herpetology. Baird was also a mentor to herpetologist Robert Kennicott, who died prematurely, at which point Baird left the field of herpetology to focus on larger projects.

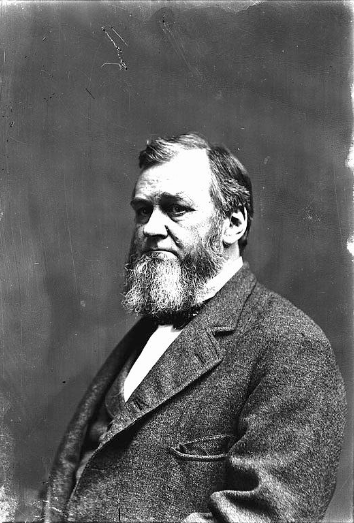
Spencer Fullerton Baird by Unknown, 1880s

Eventually, he became the Assistant Secretary, serving under Joseph Henry. As assistant, Baird helped develop a publication and journal exchange that provided scientists around the world with publications they would have a hard time accessing. He supported the work of William Stimpson, Robert Kennicott, Henry Ulke, and Henry Bryant. Between his start as Assistant Secretary and 1855, he worked with Joseph Henry to provide scientific equipment and needs to the United States and Mexican Boundary Survey. In 1855, he was elected to the American Philosophical Society. He received his Ph.D. in physical science in 1856 from Dickinson College. In 1857 and 1852 he acquired the collection of the National Institute for the Promotion of Science. However, the objects did not join the permanent collection of the Smithsonian until 1858. Baird attended the funeral of Abraham Lincoln in 1865, alongside Joseph Henry. In 1870, Baird was vacationing in Woods Hole, Massachusetts, where he developed an interest in maritime research. He went on to lead expeditions in Nova Scotia and New England.

=== United States Fish Commission and United States National Museum ===
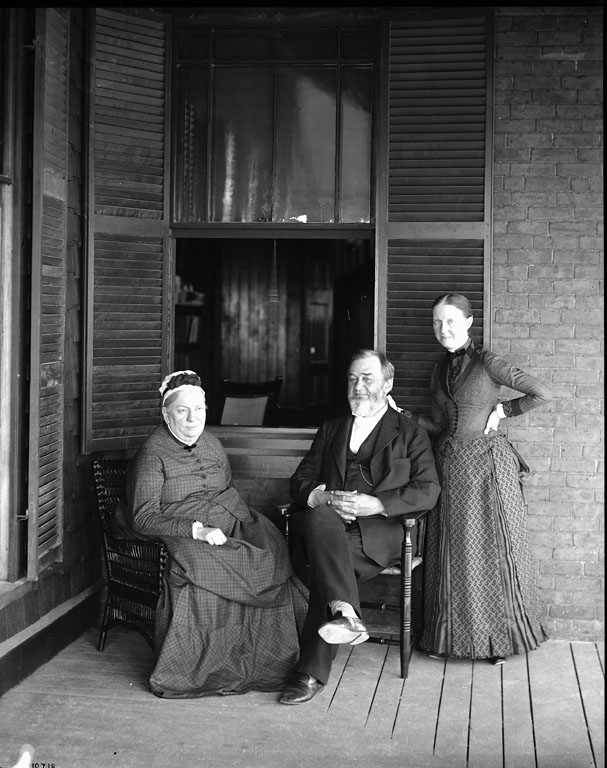
Baird with his wife and daughter in Wood's Hole, Massachusetts. It was at Wood's Hole that Baird gained interest in ichthyology.

On February 25, 1871, Ulysses S. Grant appointed Baird as the first Commissioner of Fish and Fisheries for the United States Fish Commission. He served in this position until his death. With Baird as Commissioner, the commission sought opportunities to restock rivers with salmon and lakes with other food fish and the depletion of food fish in coastal waters. Baird reported that humans were the reason for the decline of food fish in these coastal areas. Individuals with access to shoreline property used weirs, or nets, to capture large amounts of fish on the coast, which threatened the supply of fish on the coast. Baird used the U.S. Fish Commission to limit human impact by prohibiting the capture of fish in traps from 6pm on Fridays until 6pm on Mondays. The Albatross research vessel was launched during his tenure, in 1882. He was highly active in developing fishing and fishery policies for the United States, and was instrumental in making Woods Hole the research venue it is today.

Baird became the manager of the United States National Museum in 1872. Baird told George Perkins Marsh that he sought to be the director of the National Museum and that he had intentions to expand on the collections within the museum en masse. He was the primary writer of A History of North American Birds, which was published in 1874 and continues to be an important publication in ornithology today. He created all of the United States federal exhibits in the Centennial Exposition, many of which won awards. When the exposition ended, Baird was successful in persuading other exhibitors to contribute the objects from their exhibits to the Smithsonian. In total, Baird left with sixty-two boxcars filled with 4,000 cartons of objects. Owing to the large number of objects collected, in 1879, Congress approved construction for the first National Museum building, which is now the Arts and Industries Building.

=== Second Secretary at the Smithsonian ===
Joseph Henry died on May 13, 1878 and on May 17, Baird became the second Secretary of the Smithsonian. Baird was allowed to live rent-free in the Smithsonian Institution Building, but declined and had the east wing converted into a workspace. He also had telephones installed throughout the building. That year, he was made a member of the Order of St. Olav by the King of Sweden. In 1880 Baird was elected a member of the American Antiquarian Society. He oversaw the building of the new National Museum building, which opened in 1881. In September 1883, he was unanimously declared a founding member of the American Ornithologists' Union even though his duties prevented him from attending their first convention. In February 1887, Baird went on leave due to "intellectual exertion," at which point Samuel P. Langley served as Acting Secretary.

== Death and legacy ==
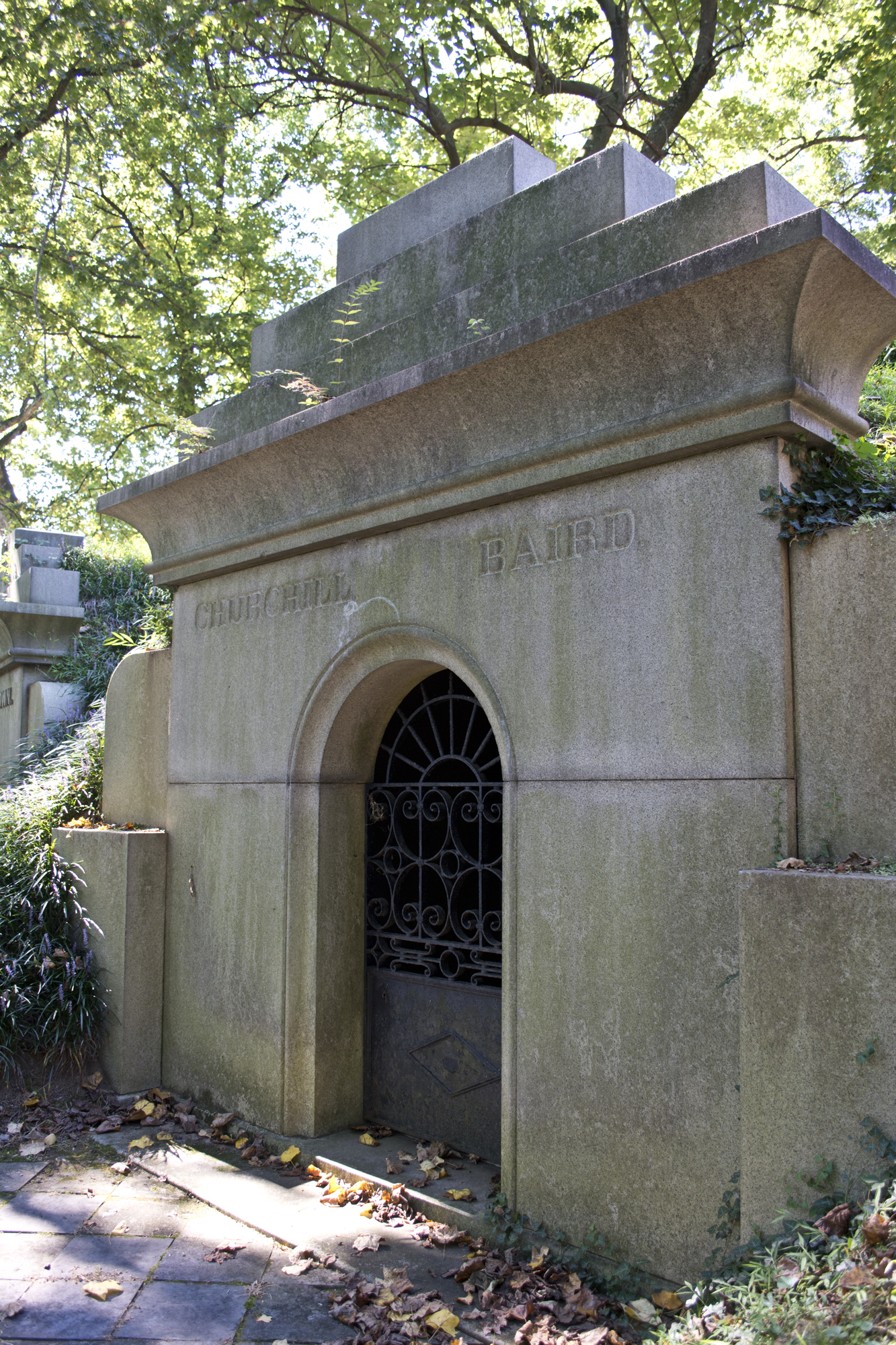
Mausoleum at Oak Hill Cemetery containing remains of Baird

Spencer Fullerton Baird died on August 19, 1887. Upon Baird's death, the Arts and Industries building was draped with a mourning cloth. John Wesley Powell spoke at Baird's funeral. Baird is buried at Oak Hill Cemetery.

Baird's sparrow, a migratory bird native to Canada, Mexico and the United States, is named after him. A medium-sized shorebird known as Baird's sandpiper is also named after him.

Baird Auditorium in the Smithsonian National Museum of Natural History is named in his honor. It is located on the National Mall side of the first floor of the museum.

Baird's wife, Mary, donated his stamp collection to the National Museum. His papers are held in the Smithsonian Institution Archives.

In 1946, Baird was one of four Smithsonian Secretaries featured in an exhibition about their lives and work curated by United States National Museum curator Theodore T. Belote. In 1922, the Baird Ornithological Club was founded and named after Baird. Spencer Baird Road in Woods Hole is named for him.

=== Eponymy ===
==== Natural world ====
- The genus Bairdiella of drumfishes was named after him by Theodore Gill in 1861.
- Baird's smooth-head, Alepocephalus bairdii Goode and Bean, 1879.
- Lancer dragonet, Callionymus bairdi Jordan, 1888
- Mottled sculpin, Cottus bairdii Girard, 1850.
- Bumphead damselfish, Microspathodon bairdii (Gill, 1862).
- Marlin-spike grenadier, Nezumia bairdii (Goode & Bean, 1877).
- Baird's beaked whale, Berardius bairdii Stejneger, 1883.
- Baird's pocket gopher, Geomys breviceps (Baird, 1855)
- Prairie deer mouse, Peromyscus maniculatus bairdii (Hoy and Kennicott, 1857)
- Baird's shrew, Sorex bairdi (Meriam, 1895)
- Baird's tapir, Tapirus bairdii (Gill, 1865).
- Baird's sparrow, Ammodramus bairdii (Audubon, 1844).
- Baird's sandpiper, Calidris bairdii Coues, 1861.
- Cuban ivory-billed woodpecker, Campephilus bairdii (now C. principalis bairdii), Cassin, 1863.
- Baird's flycatcher, Myiodynastes bairdii Gambell, 1847.
- Baird's trogon, Trogon bairdii Lawrence, 1868.
- Baird's junco, Junco bairdi Ridgeway, 1883
- Tanner crab, Chionoecetes bairdi Rathbun, 1924.
- Red lobster, Eunephrops bairdii S. I. Smith, 1885.
- Baird's rat snake, Pantherophis bairdi (Yarrow, 1880).
- Baird's patch-nosed snake, Salvadora bairdi Jan, 1860.

==== Author abbreviation in zoology ====
- Baird

==== Sea vessel ====
- M.V. Spencer F. Baird, Ocean-surveying ship.

==== Locations ====
- The Lake Shasta Caverns were formerly named Baird Cave.
