= Penrose =

Penrose may refer to:

== Places ==
=== United States ===
- Penrose, Arlington, Virginia, a neighborhood
- Penrose, Colorado, a town
- Penrose, St. Louis, Missouri, a neighborhood
- Penrose, Philadelphia, Pennsylvania, a neighborhood
- Penrose, North Carolina, an unincorporated community
- Penrose, Utah, an unincorporated community
- Penrose, Virginia, an historic district in Arlington County

=== Elsewhere ===
- Penrose, New South Wales (Wingecarribee), Australia
- Penrose, New South Wales (Wollongong), New South Wales, Australia
- Penrose, Cornwall, a country house and National Trust estate in England
- Penrose, New Zealand
- Penrose Peak (disambiguation)
- Penrose railway station (disambiguation)

== People ==
- Penrose Stout (1887–1934), American architect
- Penrose Hallowell (c. 1928–2021), Pennsylvania secretary of agriculture
- Penrose (surname), including a list of people with the name

== Other uses ==
- Penrose (brand), a brand name owned by ConAgra Foods, Inc.
- The Penrose Annual, a London-based review of graphic arts (1895–1982)
- Penrose Building, a building of Somerville College, Oxford
- Penrose drain, a rubber tube used in post-surgical wound care
- Penrose Medal, awarded by the Geological Society of America
- Penrose tiling, an aperiodic tiling discovered by Roger Penrose
- Penrose triangle and Penrose stairs, optical illusions

== See also ==
- Penrhos (disambiguation)
