= Penrose (surname) =

Penrose is a Cornish-language surname. The surname Penrose is derived from one of the places called Penrose in England and Wales: these are found in ten parishes in Cornwall (including Penrose near Porthleven), several times in Wales and once in Herefordshire.

== People ==
Notable people with the name include:

- Barrie Penrose (1942–2020), British investigative journalist, interviewer and trainer
- Billy Penrose (1925–1962), English jazz musician
- Boies Penrose (1860–1921), American lawyer and Republican Senator from Philadelphia
- Charles Penrose (disambiguation), multiple people
- Chris Penrose (born 1982), Cornish footballer and golfer
- Craig Penrose (born 1953), American football player
- Edith Penrose (1914–1996), British economist
- Emily Penrose (1858–1942), Principal of Somerville College, Oxford University
- Francis Penrose (1817–1903), British architect, archaeologist and astronomer
- George William Penrose, Lord Penrose (1938–2025), Scottish judge
- James Doyle Penrose (1862–1932), Irish painter, father of Lionel and Roland Penrose
- John Penrose (actor) (1914–1983), British actor
- John Penrose (archer) (1850–1932), British archer
- John Penrose (clergyman) (1778–1859), Church of England clergyman and theological writer
- John Penrose (Parliamentarian) (1611–?), English member of Parliament
- John Penrose (politician) (born 1964), British Conservative member of Parliament
- Jonathan Penrose (1933–2021), English chess grandmaster, son of Lionel Penrose
- Lionel Penrose (1898–1972), English geneticist, father of Oliver, Roger and Jonathan Penrose
- Martin Penrose, Irish footballer
- Oliver Penrose (born 1929), English mathematician, son of Lionel Penrose
- R. A. F. Penrose, Jr. (1863–1931), American mining geologist and entrepreneur
- Sir Roger Penrose (born 1931), English mathematical physicist (son of Lionel Penrose)
- Roland Penrose (1900–1984), English artist, historian and poet
- Scott Penrose (born 1969), British magician, magic and illusion consultant
- Spencer Penrose (1865–1939), American mining magnate, philanthropist and hotelier
- Thomas Penrose (1742–1779), clergyman and poet
- Tricia Penrose (born 1970), English actress and singer
- Valentine Penrose (1898–1978), French poet, author and collagist
- Brigadier general William H. Penrose (William Henry Penrose) (1832–1903), Union Army officer
- Willie Penrose (born 1956), Irish Labour Party politician

=== Fictional characters ===
- Llewellin Penrose, fictional character in the novel, Mr. Penrose: The Journal of Penrose, Seaman by William Williams (1727–1791)
