= Penrose Peak =

Penrose Peak may refer to:

- Penrose Peak (Montana)
- Penrose Peak (Wyoming)

== See also ==
- Mount Penrose (Montana)
- Mount Penrose (British Columbia, Canada)
