= Charles Penrose =

Charles Penrose may refer to:

- Charles Penrose (entertainer) (1873–1952), English music hall and theatre performer, and radio comedian
- Charles Penrose (rower) (1816–1868), English rower, schoolteacher and clergyman
- Charles Penrose (Royal Navy officer) (1759–1830)
- Charles B. Penrose (1798–1857), Pennsylvania attorney and politician
- Charles Bingham Penrose (1862–1925), Philadelphia gynecologist and grandson of Charles B. Penrose
- Charles W. Penrose (1832–1925), member of the Quorum of the Twelve Apostles of The Church of Jesus Christ of Latter-day Saints
