= Shirley drain =

Type of drain

The Shirley wound drain or sump drain is a suction drain with an intake tube that provides air to the bottom of the main tube. This allows a continuous flow of suction so that the tube doesn't get blocked. The Shirley drain is a double-lumen drainage tube intended to aspirate efficiently the contents of a fresh surgical wound. It removes the blood oozing from the walls of the wound cavity before it clots. Modern variations of the Shirley drain continue to be used in hospitals, incorporating flexible medical-grade materials and adjustable suction settings to improve patient comfort and efficiency.

== See also ==
- Jackson-Pratt drain
- Drain (surgery)
- Incision and drainage
