= Penrose Peak (Wyoming) =

Mountain in Wyoming, United States

- Location within Wyoming

Highest point
- Elevation: 12,461 ft (3,798 m)
- Prominence: 400 ft (120 m)
- Coordinates: 44°24′54″N 108°08′40″W

Geography
- Location: Johnson County, Wyoming, U.S.
- Parent range: Bighorn Mountains
- Topo map: USGS Cloud Peak

Penrose Peak is a mountain in the Bighorn Mountains of the Rocky Mountains in Wyoming, United States. Like Mount Penrose in British Columbia, Canada, it was named for Senator Boies Penrose of Pennsylvania, who was an avid outdoorsman and went on hunting expeditions in this area.
