= Mount Penrose (Montana) =

Mountain in Montana, United States

- Location within Montana

Highest point
- Elevation: 7,877 ft (2,401 m)
- Prominence: 1,496 ft (456 m)
- Coordinates: 48°24′34″N 113°50′14″W

Geography
- Location: Flathead County, Montana, U.S.
- Parent range: Flathead Range
- Topo map: USGS Nyack

Mount Penrose, 7,877 ft (2,401 m), is a mountain in the Flathead Range of the Rocky Mountains in Montana, United States. It is named after Charles Bingham Penrose, inventor of the Penrose surgical drain.

== See also ==
- Penrose Peak (Montana)
- Mount Penrose (British Columbia, Canada)
