= Balie Peyton =

American politician (1803–1878)

Member of the U.S. House of Representatives from Tennessee's 6th district
- In office March 4, 1833 – March 3, 1837
- Preceded by: James K. Polk
- Succeeded by: William B. Campbell

Personal details
- Born: November 26, 1803 Gallatin, Tennessee
- Died: August 18, 1878 (aged 74) Gallatin, Tennessee
- Party: Jacksonian Anti-Jacksonian
- Spouse: Anne Alexander Smith Peyton
- Children: Balie Peyton, Jr. Emily Peyton "Nan" Peyton

Balie Peyton (November 26, 1803 – August 18, 1878) was an American lawyer and politician who represented Tennessee's 6th congressional district in the United States House of Representatives.

== Biography ==
Peyton was born near Gallatin, Tennessee, on November 26, 1803. After his preparatory studies, he studied law, was admitted to the bar, and commenced practicing in Gallatin in 1824. He married Anne Alexander Smith.

His grandfather, "old Mr. Peyton," was "killed by the Indians" near Bledsoe's Lick in the 1780s.

== Career ==
Elected as a Jacksonian to the Twenty-third Congress and re-elected as a Hugh Lawson White Anti-Jacksonian supporter to the Twenty-fourth Congress, Peyton served from March 4, 1833, to March 3, 1837.

Peyton moved to New Orleans in 1841, where in 1838 he had been elected to the governing board of the Metairie Race Course, having been appointed the U.S. Attorney for the District of Louisiana, a position he held for four years from 1841 to 1845. Family life for Peyton was shattered by the fatal illness of his thirty-four-year-old wife in New Orleans in 1845. Two years later, his youngest daughter, “Nan,” died at age seven when thrown from her pony. His oldest child and daughter, Emily, cared for her father from the time her mother died until Balie's death. She never married.

Nationally known for the fine racehorses bred on his farm, Peyton had promoted and staged the Peyton Stake, a futurity race for colts and fillies dropped in the spring of 1839. Held at Nashville in 1843, the race attracted international attention because the purse was the largest that had ever been offered in America or Europe.

Peyton then served as an aide-de-camp on the staff of General William J. Worth during the Mexican–American War.

Peyton was appointed as Envoy to Chile by President Zachary Taylor, from August 9, 1849, to September 14, 1853, when he resigned. He moved to San Francisco, where he was the City Attorney from 1855 to 1857.

Returning to Gallatin in 1859 and practicing law, Peyton resided on his Station Camp Creek farm. One of his first visits to Nashville in 1862 was to the Louisville and Nashville Railroad Station to receive the mortal remains of his son, Balie Jr., a Confederate infantry officer killed in the Battle of Mill Springs in Kentucky. He was a presidential elector on the Constitutional Union ticket of John Bell and Edward Everett in 1860. In 1866, he was an unsuccessful candidate to the Fortieth Congress. He was a Conservative Party member of the Tennessee Senate from 1869 to 1871.

== Death ==
Peyton again resumed practicing law before dying on his farm near Gallatin on August 18, 1878 (age 74 years, 265 days). He is interred at the family burying ground on his estate. He was the brother of U.S. Representative Joseph Hopkins Peyton.

U.S. House of Representatives
Preceded by James K. Polk	Member of the U.S. House of Representatives from Tennessee's 6th congressional district 4 March 1833–3 March 1837	Succeeded by William B. Campbell
Diplomatic posts
Preceded by Seth Barton	United States Envoy to Chile; 16 February 1850–26 September 1853	Succeeded by David A. Starkweather
