= Ransom H. Gillet =

American politician

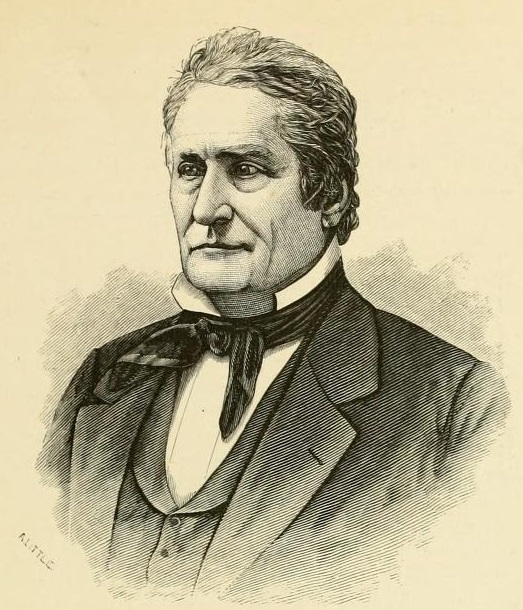
- From 1878's History of Columbia County, New York

Member of the United States House of Representatives from New York's 14th congressional district
- In office March 4, 1833 – March 3, 1837
- Preceded by: Samuel Beardsley
- Succeeded by: James B. Spencer

Solicitor of the United States Court of Claims
- In office April 26, 1858 – April 2, 1861
- Preceded by: Montgomery Blair
- Succeeded by: Charles Gibson

Assistant United States Attorney General
- In office 1855–1858
- Preceded by: George M. Bibb
- Succeeded by: Alfred B. McCalmont

Solicitor of the United States Treasury
- In office May 27, 1847 – October 30, 1849
- Preceded by: Seth Barton
- Succeeded by: John C. Clark

Register of the United States Treasury
- In office April 1, 1845 – June 3, 1847
- Preceded by: Thomas L. Smith
- Succeeded by: Daniel Graham

Personal details
- Born: Ransom Hooker Gillet; January 27, 1800 New Lebanon, New York, U.S.
- Died: October 24, 1876 (aged 76) Washington, D.C., U.S.
- Resting place: Glenwood Cemetery, Washington, D.C.
- Party: Jacksonian (before 1832); Democratic (from 1832)
- Spouse: Eleanor C. Barhydt (m. 1825–1876, his death)
- Profession: Attorney

Military service
- Allegiance: United States; New York
- Branch/service: New York State Militia
- Years of service: 1827-1837
- Rank: Major
- Unit: 49th Brigade

Ransom Hooker Gillet (January 27, 1800 – October 24, 1876) was an attorney and politician from New York. A Jacksonian and later a Democrat, he was most notable for his service in the United States House of Representatives from 1833 to 1837.

== Biography ==
Gillet was born in New Lebanon, New York on January 27, 1800, the son of John and Lucy Gillet. He pursued an academic course, then studied law with Silas Wright in Canton, New York.

He was admitted to the bar in 1822 and commenced practice in Ogdensburg, New York. Active in the New York State Militia from 1827 to 1837, Gillet attained the rank major as inspector of the 49th Brigade. From 1830 to 1833 Gillet served as Ogdensburg's postmaster. He was a delegate to the 1832 Democratic National Convention.

=== Congress ===
Gillet was elected as a Jacksonian to the Twenty-third and Twenty-fourth Congresses (March 4, 1833 – March 3, 1837). He was not a candidate for re-nomination in 1836.

=== Federal appointments ===
Gillet served as a federal commissioner to negotiate with New York's Indian tribes from 1837 to 1839. He was a delegate to the 1840 Democratic National Convention.

On April 1, 1845 Gillet was appointed Register of the United States Treasury and he served until May 27, 1847, when he was appointed Solicitor of the United States Treasury. He continued as solicitor until October 31, 1849. In 1855, Gillet was appointed Assistant United States Attorney General and he served from 1855 to 1858. In 1858, he was appointed Solicitor of the U.S. Court of Claims, and he served until 1861.

== Retirement and death ==
Gillet retired from public life in 1867 and authored several books, including a two-volume biography of Silas Wright. He died in Washington, D.C., October 24, 1876. He was interred in Glenwood Cemetery.

== Family ==
In 1825, Gillet he married Eleanor C. Barhydt (1806-1881). They were married until his death and were the parents of a son, Silas Wright Gillet (1829-1878). Silas W. Gillet was a graduate of Georgetown University and served in the United States Marine Corps during the American Civil War. He later resided in New Lebanon, where he served in local offices including town justice and school board member.

U.S. House of Representatives
Preceded by Samuel Beardsley	Member of the U.S. House of Representatives from New York's 14th congressional district March 4, 1833 – March 3, 1837	Succeeded by James B. Spencer
