= Israel Wilson Durham =

American politician and baseball team owner (1855–1909)

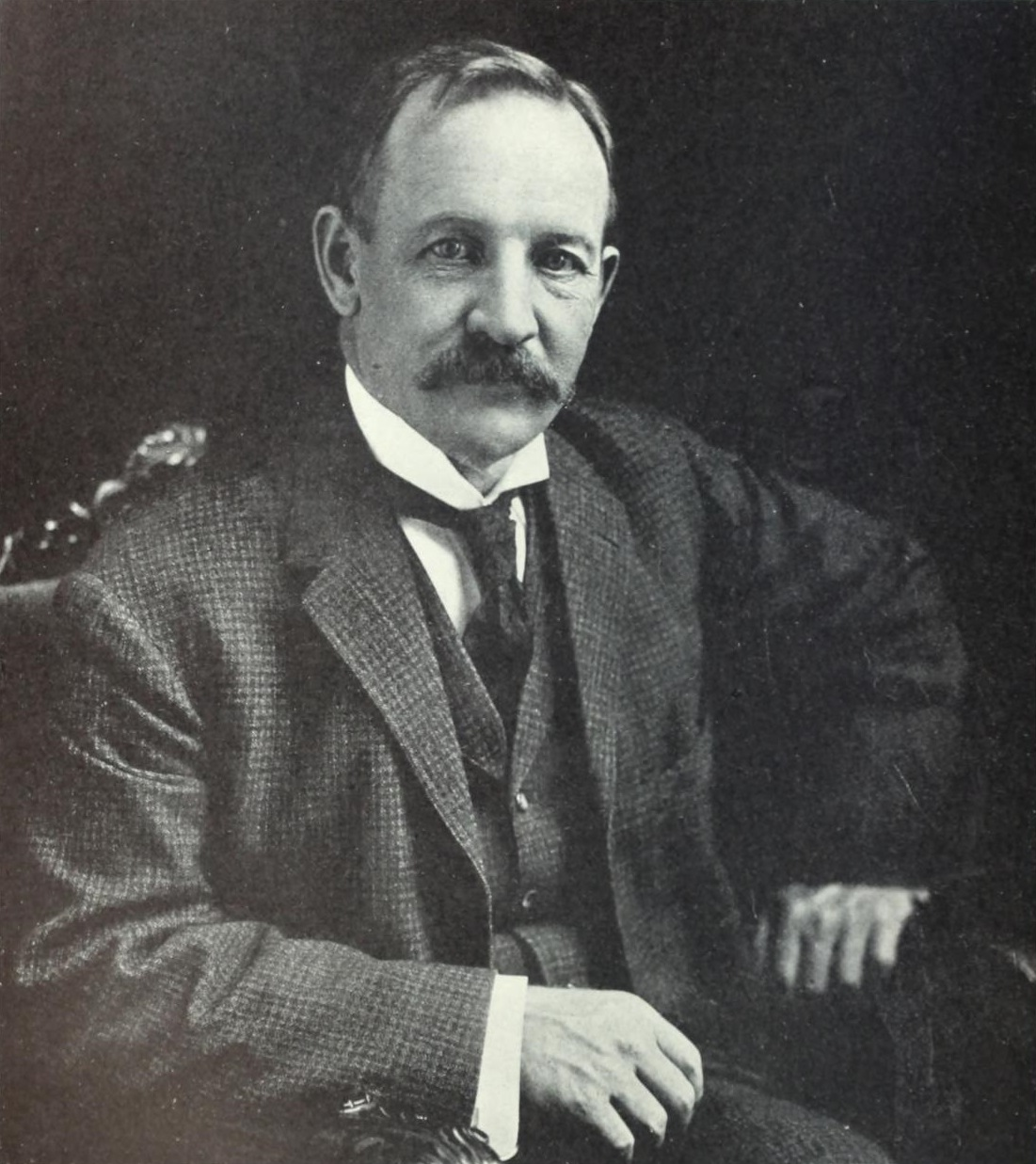

Member of the Pennsylvania Senate for the 6th district
- In office 1897–1898
- Preceded by: Boies Penrose
- Succeeded by: John Morin Scott

Member of the Pennsylvania Senate for the 2nd district
- In office 1899-1900
- Preceded by: Elwood Becker
- Succeeded by: George W. Holzwarth

Personal details
- Born: October 24, 1855 Philadelphia, Pennsylvania, U.S.
- Died: June 28, 1909 (aged 53) Atlantic City, New Jersey, U.S.
- Resting place: Mount Moriah Cemetery, Philadelphia, Pennsylvania, U.S.
- Party: Republican

Israel Wilson Durham (24 October 1855 – 28 June 1909) was an American politician from Pennsylvania who served as a Republican member of the Pennsylvania Senate for the 6th district from 1897 to 1898 and the 2nd district from 1898 to 1899. He was a political boss of Philadelphia's 7th ward and also briefly the president and principal owner of the Philadelphia Phillies baseball team in 1909.

== Early life ==
Durham was born in Philadelphia, Pennsylvania to Thomas and Jane Durham. He received a public school education and briefly entered the cloth business with J.B. Ellison & Company. He apprenticed to Silas Emory, a brick-layer for two years. He later joined his father's flour dealer business as a buyer and salesman.

== Career ==
From an early age he turned to politics, identifying himself with the Republican Party, then dominant in Philadelphia.

In 1885, he was elected police magistrate; he was re-elected in 1890. In 1897, he was elected to the Pennsylvania Senate from the 6th District to fill the unexpired term of Boies Penrose, who had risen to the United States Senate. He was a delegate to the Republican National Convention from Pennsylvania in 1900, 1904, and 1908. He was appointed state Insurance Commissioner by Governor William A. Stone, then re-appointed by Governor Samuel W. Pennypacker. He held this post until June 1, 1905, when he resigned to go West for his health. He abandoned his position as party leader in January 1906. He was re-elected to the state senate in 1908, to take the place of Senator Scott.

Durham was a political boss of Philadelphia's 7th ward and was influential in the selection of Philadelphia's mayor and most of the city government members.

In February 1909, he and a group of investors bought the Philadelphia Phillies National League Baseball Club, of which he served as president.

He died while in office on 28 June 1909 in Atlantic City, New Jersey. He was interred in Philadelphia's Mount Moriah Cemetery in Philadelphia.

Pennsylvania State Senate
Preceded by Boies Penrose	Member of the Pennsylvania Senate, 6th district 1897-1898	Succeeded by John Morin Scott
Preceded by Elwood Becker	Member of the Pennsylvania Senate, 2nd district 1899-1900	Succeeded by George W. Hozwarth
