= James B. Spencer =

American politician

Member of the U.S. House of Representatives from New York's 14th district
- In office 1837–1839

Personal details
- Born: James Bradley Spencer; April 26, 1781 Salisbury, Connecticut, US
- Died: March 26, 1848 (aged 66) Fort Covington, New York, US
- Party: Democratic

James Bradley Spencer (April 26, 1781 – March 26, 1848) was a U.S. representative from New York, serving one term from 1837 to 1839.

== Biography ==
Born in Salisbury, Connecticut, Spencer received a limited education. He moved to Franklin County, New York, and settled in Fort Covington. He raised a company for the War of 1812, and served as Captain in the Twenty-ninth United States Infantry. He was appointed a local magistrate in 1814 and was Surrogate of Franklin County 1828–1837. He was appointed loan commissioner in 1829 and served as member of the state assembly in 1831 and 1832.

=== Congress ===
Spencer was elected as a Democrat to the Twenty-fifth Congress (March 4, 1837 – March 3, 1839).

=== Death ===
He died in Fort Covington, New York, March 26, 1848. He was interred probably in the Old Cemetery near Fort Covington.

== Sources ==
- United States Congress. "James B. Spencer (id: S000725)". Biographical Directory of the United States Congress.

U.S. House of Representatives
Preceded by Ransom H. Gillet	Member of the U.S. House of Representatives from New York's 14th congressional district March 4, 1837 – March 3, 1839	Succeeded by John Fine
