= Penrhos =

Penrhos is derived from the Welsh words pen ("head" or "top") and rhos ("moorland"). It may refer to:

Places

- Penrhos, Anglesey, a village in Wales
  - Penrhos Country Park (AKA Penrhos Coastal Park), a country park near Penrhos, Anglesey
- Penrhos, Gwynedd, Wales, a village and former civil parish
  - RAF Penrhos, a former Royal Air Force airfield near Penrhos, Gwynedd
- Penrhos, Herefordshire, England, an area or hamlet at the top of the hill east of Kington, Herefordshire near the Welsh border
- Penrhos, Monmouthshire, Wales, a village in the community of Llantilio Crossenny in Monmouthshire
- Penrhos, Powys, Wales
- Penrhos Cottage, a very small cottage situated to the south east of Maenclochog, Pembrokeshire, Wales

Organisations

- Penrhos College, Perth, an independent school for girls in Western Australia
- Rydal Penrhos, an independent co-educational boarding school in Colwyn Bay, North Wales

People

- Cledwyn Hughes, Baron Cledwyn of Penrhos (1916–2001), Welsh politician

Transport

- Penhros Junction, a railway junction and part of the Barry Railway Company lines.

== See also ==
- Penrose (disambiguation)
