= Seth Barton (attorney) =

American politician (1795–1854)

7th United States Ambassador to Chile
- In office January 5, 1848 – May 22, 1849
- President: James K. Polk
- Preceded by: George William Crump
- Succeeded by: Balie Peyton

5th Solicitor of the United States Treasury
- In office March 25, 1845 – May 27, 1847
- Preceded by: Charles B. Penrose
- Succeeded by: Ransom H. Gillet

Personal details
- Born: December 5, 1795 Baltimore, Maryland, U.S.
- Died: December 29, 1854 (aged 59) New Orleans, Louisiana, U.S.
- Cause of death: Yellow fever
- Parent(s): Seth Barton; Sarah Emerson Maxwell
- Education: Washington and Lee University
- Profession: Politician, lawyer

Seth Barton (December 5, 1795 – December 29, 1854) was an American attorney and government official who was active in Alabama and Louisiana. He served the federal government as Solicitor of the United States Treasury and Chargé d'affaires in Chile.

== Biography ==
Barton was born in Baltimore, Maryland on December 5, 1795, the son of shipping merchant Seth Barton and Sarah Emerson (Maxwell) Barton. He attended Washington and Lee University, where he studied law and attained admission to the bar.

In 1821 he relocated to Tuscaloosa, Alabama, where he continued to practice law and became involved in the newspaper business. He apparently served in the militia, in that he was often referred to in correspondence and press accounts as "Colonel", though the exact details of his military service are not currently known.

Barton was elected to the Alabama House of Representatives in 1825.

In 1828 Barton was an unsuccessful candidate for the United States House of Representatives.

Barton moved to New Orleans, Louisiana in 1830, where he continued to practice law as a partner of Judah P. Benjamin. In 1843 he ran unsuccessfully for the Louisiana House of Representatives, and in 1844 he supported James K. Polk for President, including writing letters to the editor under the pen name John Randolph of Roanoke.

Polk, as President, rewarded Barton with an appointment as Solicitor of the Treasury, where he served from 1845 to 1847.

Barton served as U.S. Chargé d'affaires in Chile from 1847 to 1849. While at this post he created controversy by marrying a local woman in a Protestant service. The leaders of Chile's Catholic Church were angered because as a Protestant and a man who had been divorced, they believed Barton to be violating church tenets by marrying Isabel Astaburruaga, who was Catholic.

After leaving office, Barton resumed practicing law in New Orleans as the partner of Pierre Soulé. He died of yellow fever in New Orleans on December 29, 1854.

Legal offices
Preceded by Charles B. Penrose	Solicitor of the United States Treasury; 1845–1847	Succeeded by Ransom H. Gillet
Diplomatic posts
Preceded by William Crump	U.S. Chargé d'affaires in Chile; January 5, 1848–May 22, 1849	Succeeded by Balie Peyton
