= Penrose drain =

Device to prevent buildup of fluid in a surgical site

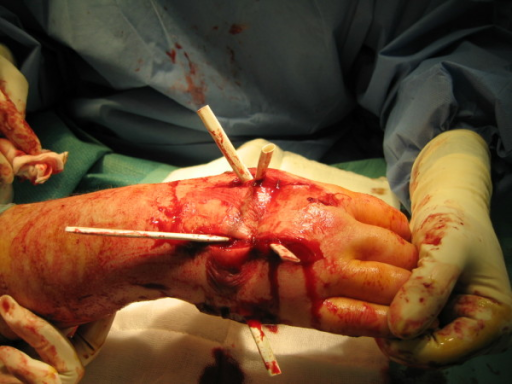
Intraoperative image of the dorsal region of the right hand of the patient after removal of the hematoma, aspiration of iodinated contrast and fasciotomy. Six Penrose drains were left and the edges of the surgical wound were closed with staples.

A Penrose drain is a soft, flexible rubber tube used as a surgical drain, to prevent the buildup of fluid in a surgical site. It belongs to the "passive" type of drain, the other broad type being "active". The Penrose drain is named after American gynecologist Charles Bingham Penrose (1862–1925).

== Common uses ==
A Penrose drain removes fluid from a wound area. Frequently it is put in place by a surgeon after a procedure is complete to prevent the area from accumulating fluid, such as blood, which could serve as a medium for bacteria to grow in. In podiatry, a Penrose drain is often used as a tourniquet during a hallux nail avulsion procedure or ingrown toenail extraction. It can also be used to drain cerebrospinal fluid to treat a hydrocephalus patient.

== See also ==
- Instruments used in general surgery
