= Drain (surgery) =

Tube used to remove pus, blood or other fluids from a wound

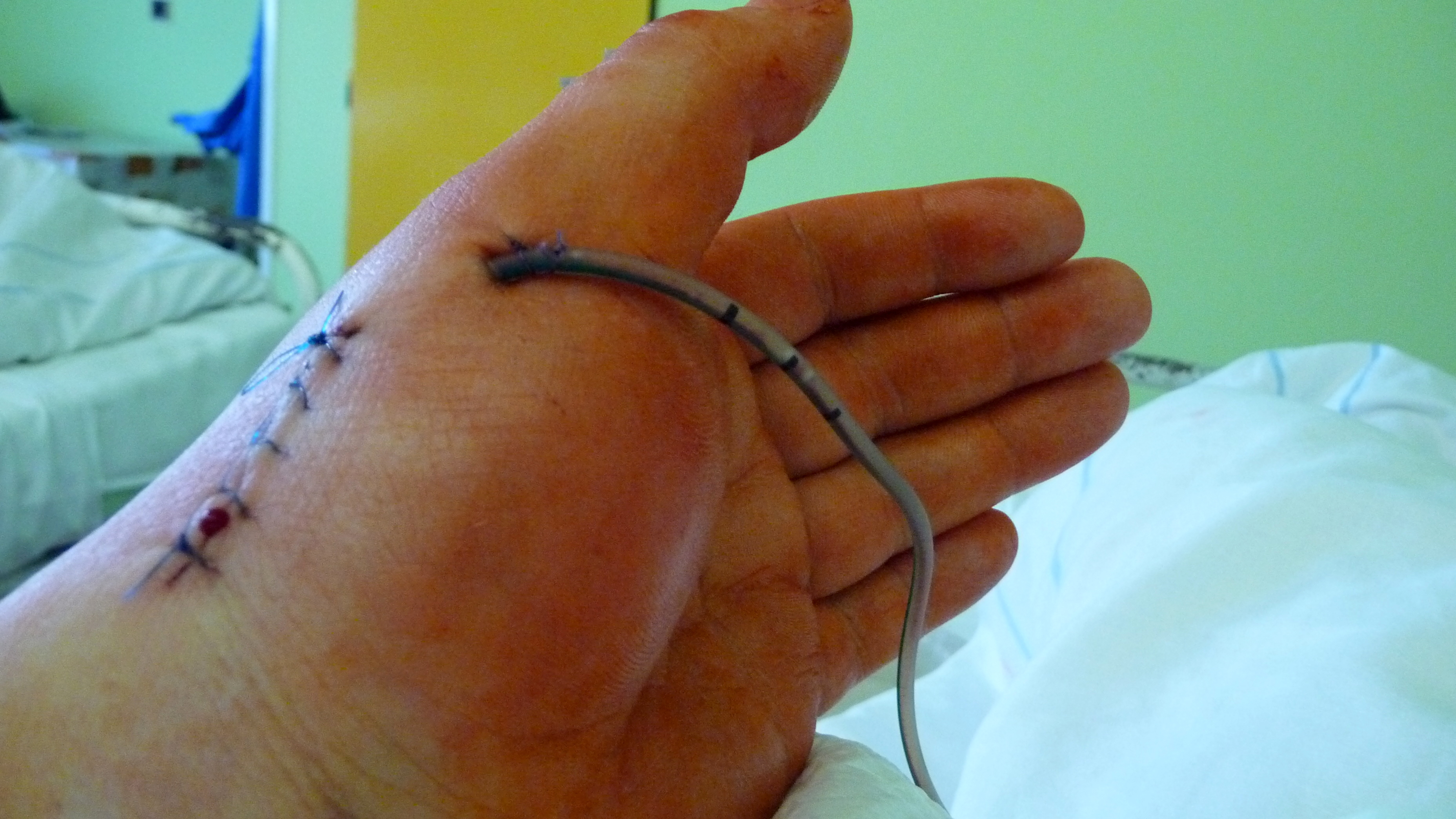
Surgical drain on the left hand after surgery of Bennett's fracture basis MTC primi manus 1. sin (S62.20) which was treated by alignment of a fracture and inside fixation by two titanium screws MS.

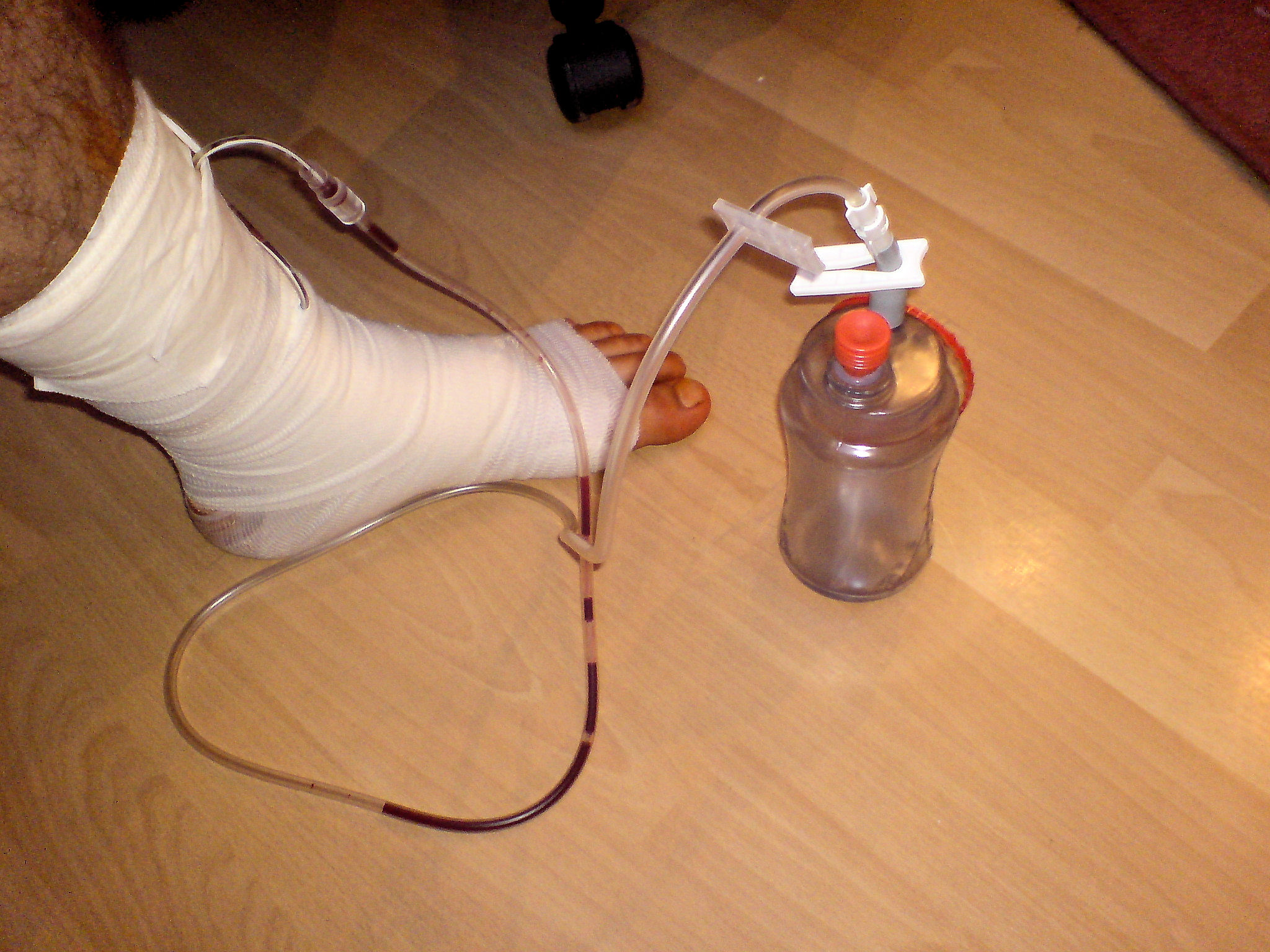
Drainage with bottle after implant removal

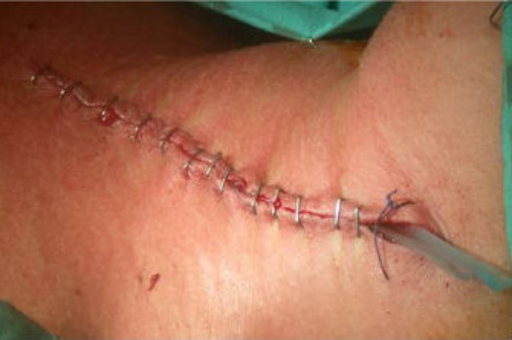
Photograph showing a subcutaneous neck drain in the left neck wound

A surgical drain is a tube used to remove pus, blood or other fluids from a wound, body cavity, or organ. They are commonly placed by surgeons or interventional radiologists after procedures or some types of injuries, but they can also be used as an intervention for decompression. There are several types of drains, and selection of which to use often depends on the placement site and how long the drain is needed.

== Use and management ==
Drains help to remove contents, usually fluids, from inside the body. This is beneficial since fluid accumulation may cause distension and pressure, which can lead to pain. For example, nasogastric (NG) tubes inserted through the nose and into the stomach can help remove stomach contents for patients who have a blockage further along in their gastrointestinal tract. After surgery, drains can be placed to remove blood, lymph, or other fluids that accumulate in the wound bed. This helps to promote wound healing and allows healthcare providers to monitor the wound for any signs of internal infection or damage to surgically repaired structures.

Drains may be classified as passive or active, open or closed, and external or internal. Passive drains rely on gravity or capillary action to remove fluid, whereas active drains rely on a suction/vacuum force, whether that be through connection to wall suction, a portable suction device, or a bulb that has been squeezed to create a vacuum. Open drains are commonly used for superficial wounds and drain into dressings or a stoma bag. Closed drains are tubes or other channel-like structures that are connected to a container, thereby creating a closed system. External drains go from inside the body to outside the body and can be seen, while internal drains are completely inside the body. An example of an internal drain is a ventriculo-peritoneal shunt, which is a tube that connects ventricles of the brain to the peritoneal cavity. This helps remove extra cerebrospinal fluid from the brain.

Accurate recording of the volume of drainage as well as the contents is vital to ensure proper healing and monitor for excessive bleeding. The amount of drained fluids can be used to determine when the drain should be removed. Drains will have protective dressings that will need to be changed daily/as needed.

== Types of drains ==
Surgical drains can be broadly classified into:

- Jackson-Pratt drain – consists of a perforated round or flat tube connected to a negative pressure collection device. The collection device is typically a bulb with a drainage port which can be opened to remove fluid or air. After compressing the bulb to remove fluid or air, negative pressure is created as the bulb returns to its normal shape.
- Blake drain – a round silicone tube with channels that carry fluid to a negative pressure collection device. Drainage is thought to be achieved by capillary action, allowing fluid to travel through the open grooves into a closed cross section, which contains the fluid and allows it to be suctioned through the tube.
- Penrose drain – a soft rubber tube.
- Negative pressure wound therapy – Involves the use of enclosed foam and a suction device attached; this is one of the newer types of wound healing/drain devices which promotes faster tissue granulation, often used for large surgical/trauma/non-healing wounds.
- Redivac drain – a high negative pressure drain. Suction is applied through the drain to generate a vacuum and draw fluids into a bottle.
- Shirley drain.
- Chest tube – is a flexible plastic tube that is inserted through the chest wall and into the pleural space or mediastinum.

== See also ==
- Wound healing
- Incision and drainage
- Instruments used in general surgery
