= Penrose railway station =

Penrose railway station may refer to:

- Penrose railway station, New South Wales, on the Main South line in Australia
- Penrose railway station, Auckland, on the Auckland railway network in New Zealand
