= Jackson-Pratt drain =

Surgical drain device

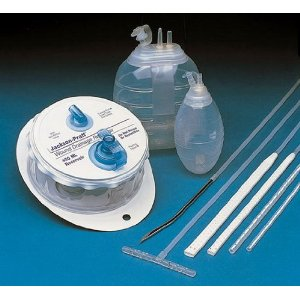
Jackson-Pratt Drain

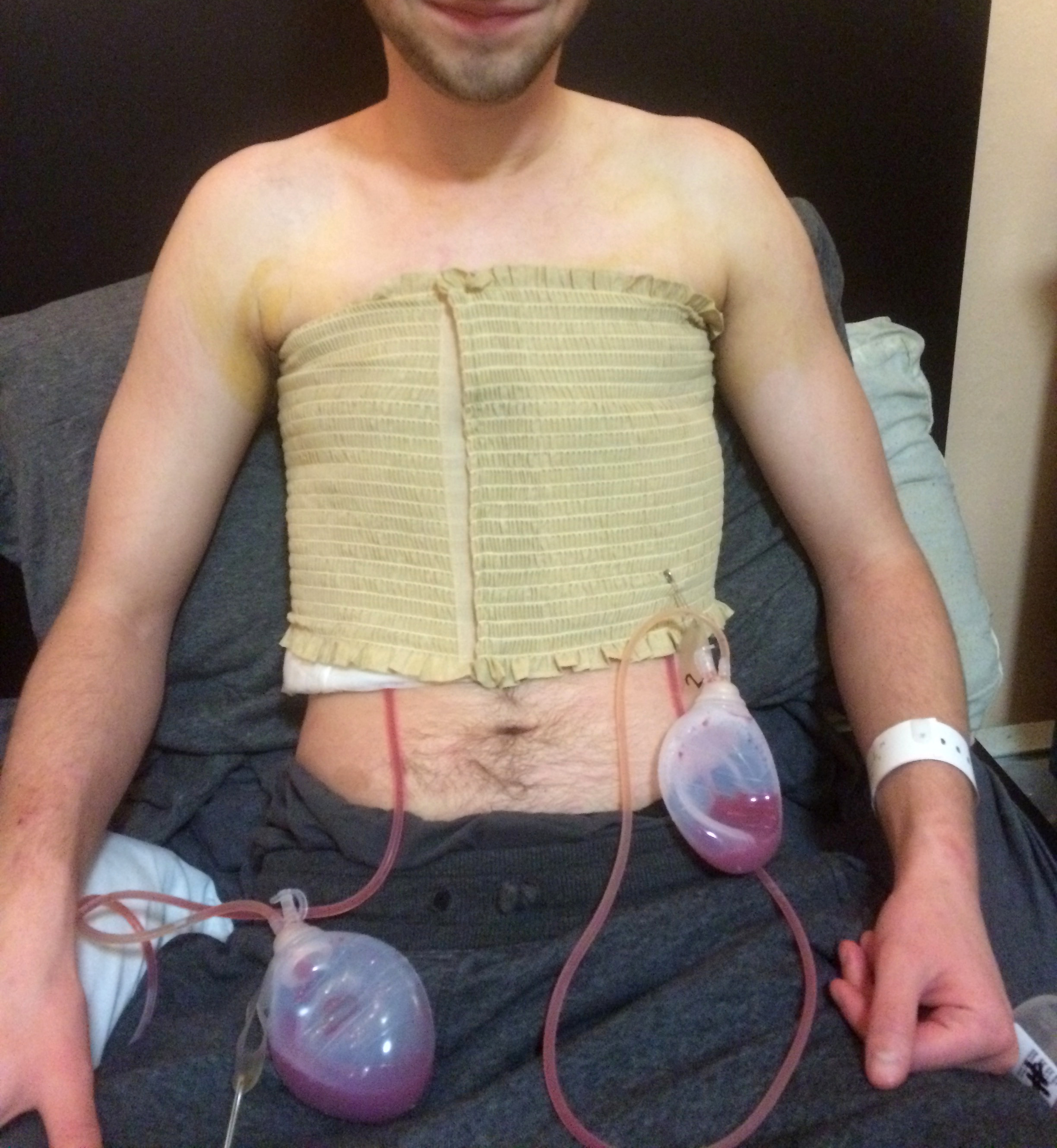
Trans man with two Jackson-Pratt drains after keyhole mastectomy

A Jackson-Pratt drain (also called a JP drain) is a closed-suction medical device that is commonly used as a post-operative drain for collecting bodily fluids from surgical sites. The device consists of an internal drain connected to a grenade-shaped bulb or circular cylinder via plastic tubing.

The purpose of a drain is to prevent fluid (blood or other) buildup in a closed ("dead") space, which may cause either disruption of the wound and the healing process or become an infected abscess, with either scenario possibly requiring a formal drainage/repair procedure (and possibly another trip to the operating room). The drain is also used to evacuate an internal abscess before surgery when an infection already exists. Clots and other solid matter in the drainage fluid may occlude the tubing, preventing the device from draining properly.

== Care and maintenance ==
The flexible bulb has a plug that can be opened to pour off collected fluid. Each time fluid is removed, the patient, caregiver or healthcare provider squeezes the air out of the bulb and replaces the plug before releasing the bulb. The resulting vacuum creates suction in the drainage tubing, which gradually draws fluid from the surgical site into the bulb. The bulb may be repeatedly opened to remove the collected fluid and squeezed again to restore suction. It is best to empty drains before they are more than half full to avoid the discomfort of the weight of the drain pulling on the internal tubing.

JP drains come in flat and round forms, and these are available in varying sizes. The flat drains are measured in millimeters, and the round drains are measured in French sizes.

Patients or caretakers can "strip" the drains by taking a damp towel or piece of cloth and bracing the portion of the tubing closest to the body with their fingers, run the cloth down the length of the tube to the drain bulb. One can also put a little bit of lotion or mineral oil on their fingertips to lubricate the tube to make stripping easier. The portion of the tube closest to the exit point of the drain from the body should be gripped first, and once the length of the drain is stripped, the end closest to the surgical site should then be released. This increases the level of suction and helps to move clots through the drainage tube into the bulb.

It is important to watch the skin around the drain for signs of possible infection: increased redness, pain, or swelling; fever greater than 101 °F; cloudy yellow, tan, or foul-smelling drainage.

Any closed suction drain system, like the Jackson-Pratt, can become clogged with fibrin or clot. This results in loss of drain patency and thus fluid, blood or infected material can build up in the wound resulting in a wound hematoma and or abscess. Careful attention should be directed to make sure the drains do not clot or become clogged when they are still in use. This risk can be reduced by a daily subcutaneous injection of low-molecular-weight heparin (LMWH) until the surgical drain is removed.

== Common uses ==
- Abdominal surgery
- Breast surgery
- Craniotomy
- Mastectomy
- Thoracic surgery
- Joint replacement (arthroplasty)

== Namesake ==
The Jackson-Pratt Drain (informally referred to as the "brain drain") was named after its inventors Drs. Fredrick E. Jackson (Chief, Department of Neurosurgical Surgery, Naval Hospital, Camp Pendleton, CA) and Richard A. Pratt (Naval Hospital, Camp Pendleton, CA). First publications mentioning this device appeared in 1971–1972.

== See also ==
- Instruments used in general surgery
