= Mount Penrose =

Mountain in British Columbia, Canada

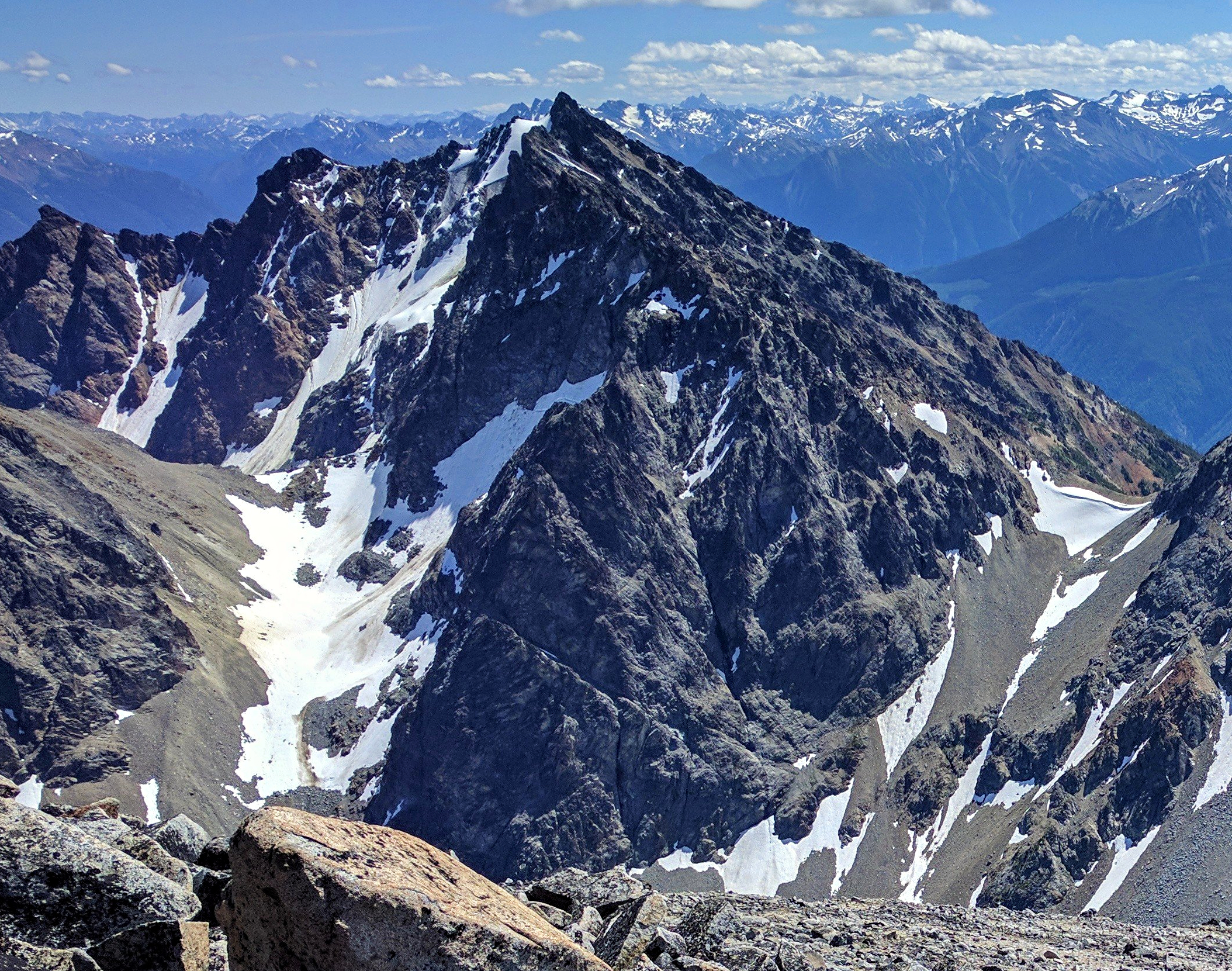
- Mount Penrose seen from Dickson Peak

Highest point
- Elevation: 2,634 m (8,642 ft)
- Prominence: 392 m (1,286 ft)
- Listing: Mountains of British Columbia
- Coordinates: 50°52′13″N 122°57′37″W

Geography
- Location within British Columbia Location within Canada
- Interactive map of Mount Penrose
- Location: British Columbia, Canada
- District: Lillooet Land District
- Parent range: Dickson Range; Chilcotin Ranges
- Topo map: NTS 92J15 Bralorne

Climbing
- First ascent: Boies Penrose

Mount Penrose, known locally as Penrose, 2,634 m (8,642 ft), is the easternmost summit of the Dickson Range, a subrange of the Chilcotin Ranges, near Gold Bridge, British Columbia, Canada and immediately above and to the west of Gun Lake. It was named for Senator Boies Penrose, of Philadelphia, Pennsylvania, who was the first to climb it, during a hunting expedition led by famed guide W.G. "Bill" Manson.

== Climate ==
Based on the Köppen climate classification, Mount Penrose is located in a subarctic climate zone of western North America. Most weather fronts originate in the Pacific Ocean, and travel east toward the Coast Mountains where they are forced upward by the range (Orographic lift), causing them to drop their moisture in the form of rain or snowfall. As a result, the Coast Mountains experience high precipitation, especially during the winter months in the form of snowfall. Temperatures can drop below −20 °C with wind chill factors below −30 °C. The months July through September offer the most favorable weather for climbing Mount Penrose.

== See also ==
- Mount Penrose (Montana)
- Penrose Peak (disambiguation)
