= Charles B. Penrose =

American politician (1798–1857)

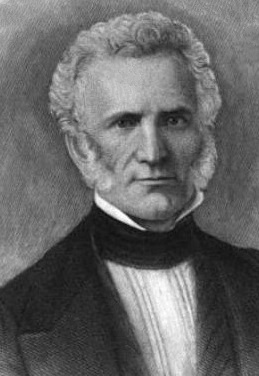

1st Assistant Secretary of the Treasury
- In office March 12, 1849 – October 9, 1849
- President: Zachary Taylor
- Preceded by: Position established
- Succeeded by: Allen A. Hall

4th Solicitor of the United States Treasury
- In office March 17, 1841 – March 4, 1845
- President: William Henry Harrison; John Tyler
- Preceded by: Matthew Birchard
- Succeeded by: Seth Barton

Speaker of the Pennsylvania Senate
- In office 1838–1839
- In office 1841–1841

Pennsylvania State Senate, 14th district
- In office 1838–1841

Pennsylvania State Senate, 16th district
- In office 1833–1836

Pennsylvania State Senate, 1st district
- In office 1857–1857

Personal details
- Born: October 6, 1798 Philadelphia, Pennsylvania, U.S.
- Died: April 6, 1857 (aged 58) Harrisburg, Pennsylvania, U.S.
- Resting place: Laurel Hill Cemetery, Philadelphia, Pennsylvania, U.S.
- Party: Democratic-Republican, Whig, Republican
- Spouse: Valeria Fullerton Biddle
- Children: 5
- Parents: Clement Biddle Penrose; Anne Howard Bingham
- Relatives: Boies Penrose (grandson); Charles Bingham Penrose (grandson); R. A. F. Penrose Jr. (grandson); Spencer Penrose (grandson); See Biddle family
- Profession: Lawyer

Charles Bingham Penrose (October 6, 1798 – April 6, 1857) was an American politician who served as a Democratic-Republican and Whig member of the Pennsylvania Senate for the 16th and 14th district from 1833 to 1841 and as a Republican member for the 1st district in 1857. He served as Speaker of the Pennsylvania Senate from 1838 to 1839 and again in 1841. He was a key figure during the Buckshot War unrest in Harrisburg, Pennsylvania, after the 1838 legislative election, when both Whigs and Democrats claimed control over the Pennsylvania House of Representatives.

He served as Solicitor of the United States Treasury from 1841 to 1845 in the William Henry Harrison and John Tyler administrations and as the first Assistant Secretary of the Treasury in 1849 during the Zachary Taylor administration.

== Early life ==
Penrose was born in the Frankford neighborhood of Philadelphia, Pennsylvania, on October 6, 1798, to Clement Biddle Penrose and Anna Howard Bingham. He moved with his family to St. Louis, Missouri, when his father was assigned as commissioner of the Louisiana Territory by President Thomas Jefferson. He volunteered to fight during the War of 1812, however the St. Louis based company was never called into active service.

Penrose studied law and was admitted to the bar in 1821.

== Political career ==
Penrose was elected as a Democratic-Republican party member of the Pennsylvania Senate for the 16th district and served from 1833 to 1835. He switched political parties to the Whig party and served for the 16th district from 1835 to 1837. He served as a Whig member of the Pennsylvania Senate for the 14th district from 1837 to 1841 including as Speaker of the Senate from 1838 to 1839 and again in 1841.

=== Buckshot War ===
Penrose was a key figure during the Buckshot War of 1838, when both the Whig and Democratic parties claimed control over the Pennsylvania House of Representatives. Penrose certified the Whig results from Philadelphia for the Senate which prompted Charles Brown, one of the rejected candidates, to request to speak. A crowd of hundreds armed with bowie knives and pistols were in attendance to support the Democratic side. They began to shout "You shall admit Brown and Stevens (another Democratic candidate)" and "We will have Burrowes', Stevens', and Penrose's blood". Penrose, Thaddeus Stevens and Secretary of Commonwealth Thomas H. Burrowes fled the Capitol through a window in the back of the Senate chambers to escape the mob.

Governor Joseph Ritner declared a rebellion and Pennsylvania State Milita General Robert Patterson came to Harrisburg with troops to quell any potential violence. Both Penrose and Governor Ritner wrote to Captain Edwin Vose Sumner in command of Federal troops in Carlisle to also come to Harrisburg, however Vose refused to interfere in what he deemed a state political matter.

=== Treasury ===
He was a delegate to the convention that nominated William Henry Harrison as president. In 1841, Penrose was appointed Solicitor of the Treasury in the Harrison administration and was reappointed in the John Tyler administration from 1841 to 1845. In March 1849 he was appointed the first Assistant Secretary of the Treasury, serving under William Morris Meredith in the Zachary Taylor administration, but only served for a short time.

He switched political parties again and served as a Republican member of the Pennsylvania Senate for the 1st district in 1857.

During his second tenure in the State Senate, Penrose was accused of using bribes to arrange the election of Simon Cameron to the United States Senate, but nothing was proved and he was not charged with wrongdoing.

== Business career ==
He established a law practice in Carlisle, Pennsylvania, from 1845 to 1847 and in Philadelphia, from 1847 to 1857.

He was president of the Cumberland Valley Railroad, published three volumes of "Reports of Cases in the Supreme Court of Pennsylvania" and served as trustee and secretary of the Board of Trustees for Dickinson College.

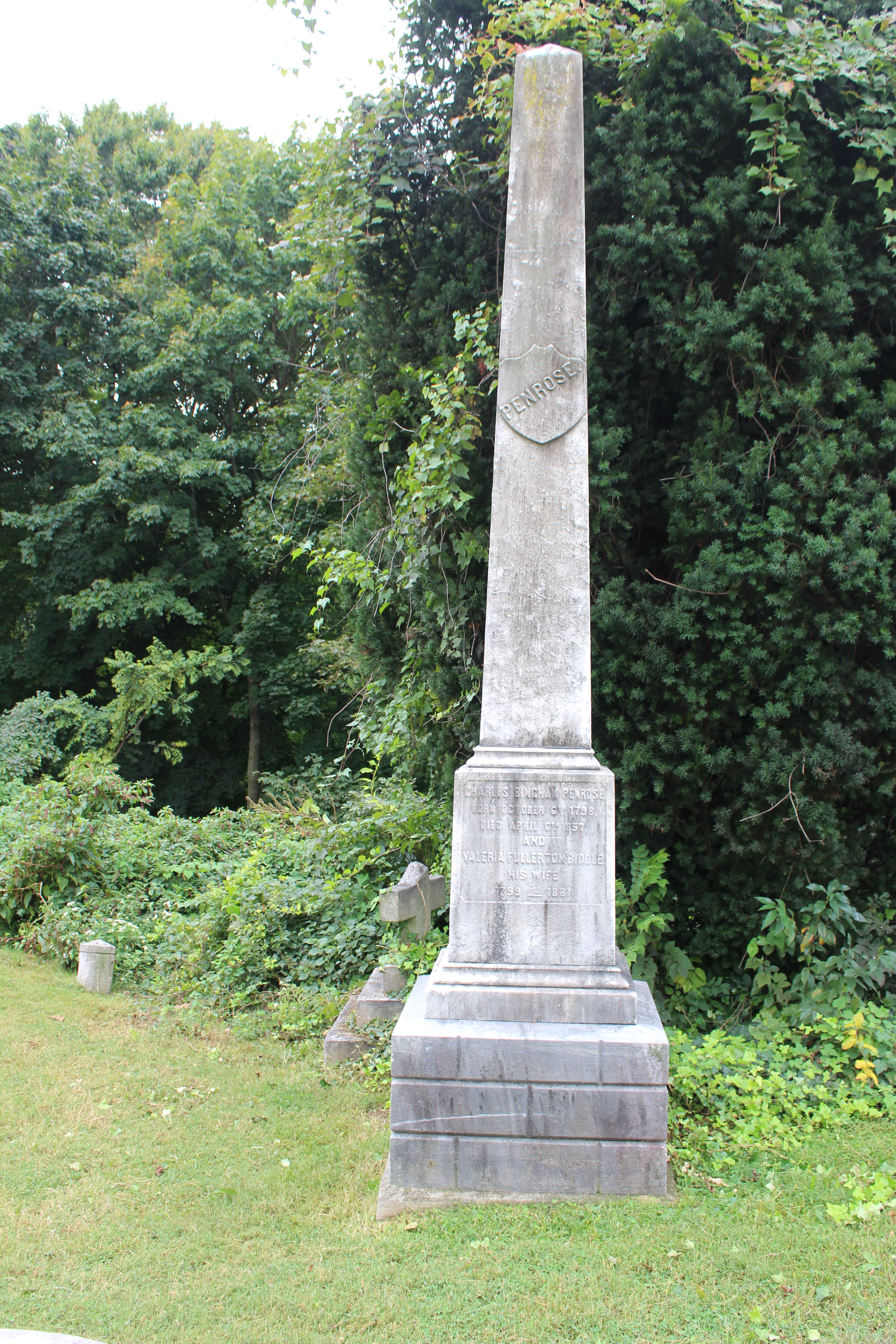
Charles B. Penrose tombstone in Laurel Hill Cemetery

Penrose died of pneumonia in Harrisburg on April 6, 1857, and was interred at Laurel Hill Cemetery in Philadelphia.

== Personal life and family ==
He married a cousin, Valeria Fullerton Biddle and together they had five children. She was a granddaughter of early American clergyman and patriot Elihu Spencer. Their second son, Dr. R.A.F. Penrose Sr., was professor of obstetrics and diseases of women and children at the University of Pennsylvania.

His grandson Charles Bingham Penrose was a Philadelphia gynecologist who invented the Penrose surgical drain. Another grandson, Boies Penrose became a U.S. Senator. Grandsons R.A.F. Penrose and Spencer Penrose also achieved distinction, the former for his geologic surveys and entrepreneurial activity in Texas, Arkansas and Colorado, the latter for establishing many mining and financial companies in Colorado and Utah, as a founding father of present day Colorado Springs, founder of the Broadmoor Pikes Peak International Hill Climb (the second oldest auto race in the US), and the Pike's Peak Chapter of the American Red Cross.

== Publications ==
- Address of the Hon. Charles B. Penrose, Speaker of the Senate: And the Speeches of Messrs. Fraley (city), Williams, Pearson and Penrose, Delivered in the Senate of Pennsylvania, on the Subject of the Insurrection at Harrisburg ("Buckshot War") at the Meeting of the Legislature in December, 1838, Harrisburg: E. Guyer, 1839

Pennsylvania State Senate
Preceded by	Member of the Pennsylvania Senate, 16th District; 1833-1837	Succeeded by
Preceded by	Member of the Pennsylvania Senate, 14th District; 1837-1841	Succeeded by
Preceded by	Member of the Pennsylvania Senate, 1st District; 1857	Succeeded by
Political offices
Preceded by Position established	U.S. Assistant Secretary of the Treasury; Served under: Zachary Taylor; 1849 – 1849	Succeeded by Allen A. Hall
Legal offices
Preceded by Matthew Birchard	Solicitor of the United States Treasury; 1841–1845	Succeeded by Seth Barton
