= Penrose Peak (Montana) =

Mountain in Montana, United States

- Location within Montana

Highest point
- Elevation: 7,232 ft (2,204 m)
- Prominence: 432 ft (132 m)
- Coordinates: 47°27′51″N 115°08′42″W

Geography
- Location: Sanders County, Montana, U.S.
- Parent range: Coeur d'Alene Mountains
- Topo map: USGS Penrose Peak

Penrose Peak is a mountain in the Coeur d'Alene Mountains of the Rocky Mountains in Montana, United States.
