= R. A. F. Penrose Jr. =

American mining geologist and entrepreneur (1863–1931)

- Born: December 17, 1863; Philadelphia, Pennsylvania, U.S.
- Died: July 31, 1931 (aged 67)

Richard Alexander Fullerton Penrose Jr. (December 17, 1863 – July 31, 1931), was an American mining geologist and entrepreneur.

He was from a prominent Philadelphia family of British descent. His brothers were U.S. senator Boies Penrose, mining engineer Spencer Penrose, and gynecologist Charles Bingham Penrose, and his grandfather was U.S. politician Charles B. Penrose.

Penrose graduated in 1885 with a Ph.D. from Harvard for work on phosphates. Later, he performed geological surveys in Texas and Arkansas until 1892, and then traveled the country as a mining surveyor. Most notable was his survey of Cripple Creek, Colorado, for the U.S. Geological Survey. Penrose refrained from purchasing or investing in mines in the Cripple Creek area because of what he saw as his ethical responsibility as a USGS employee, but did purchase and invest in mines elsewhere, including silver and copper mines in Arizona.

In 1903 his brothers and father were investors who formed the Utah Copper Company.

After his father died in 1908, Penrose made a complete career change, using his knowledge as a mining geologist to succeed as a mining investor and as an entrepreneur in other areas as well. Having amassed considerable wealth in these efforts, Penrose established the Penrose Medal of the Geological Society of America (GSA) in 1927.

Penrose was very active in GSA: he was elected as a Member of GSA in 1889, served on GSA Council from 1914 to 1916, was GSA vice president in 1919, a member of the Finance Committee from 1924 to 1929, and GSA president in 1930. Upon his death in 1931, he left a generous bequest to GSA, with the remainder of his estate after more minor bequests divided equally between the Geological Society of America and the American Philosophical Society of Philadelphia: nearly $4 million went to each society (approximately equivalent to $85 million in 2025). The Penrose bequest serves to support the research grants program of the Geological Society of America.

Penrose was also a founding member and president of the Society of Economic Geologists (SEG), created in 1920 by GSA members who were especially interested in economic geology. Penrose established the Penrose Gold Medal of the SEG in 1923.

In 1905, Penrose was elected to the American Philosophical Society. Penrose was President of the Academy of Natural Sciences of Philadelphia 1922-1926.

Penrose was inducted into the US National Mining Hall of Fame in 2006.

Beginning in 1969, the informal, interdisciplinary Penrose Conferences sponsored by the Geological Society of America are named in his honor.

== See also ==
- Daniel Barringer (geologist)
