= Boies Penrose =

American politician (1860–1921)

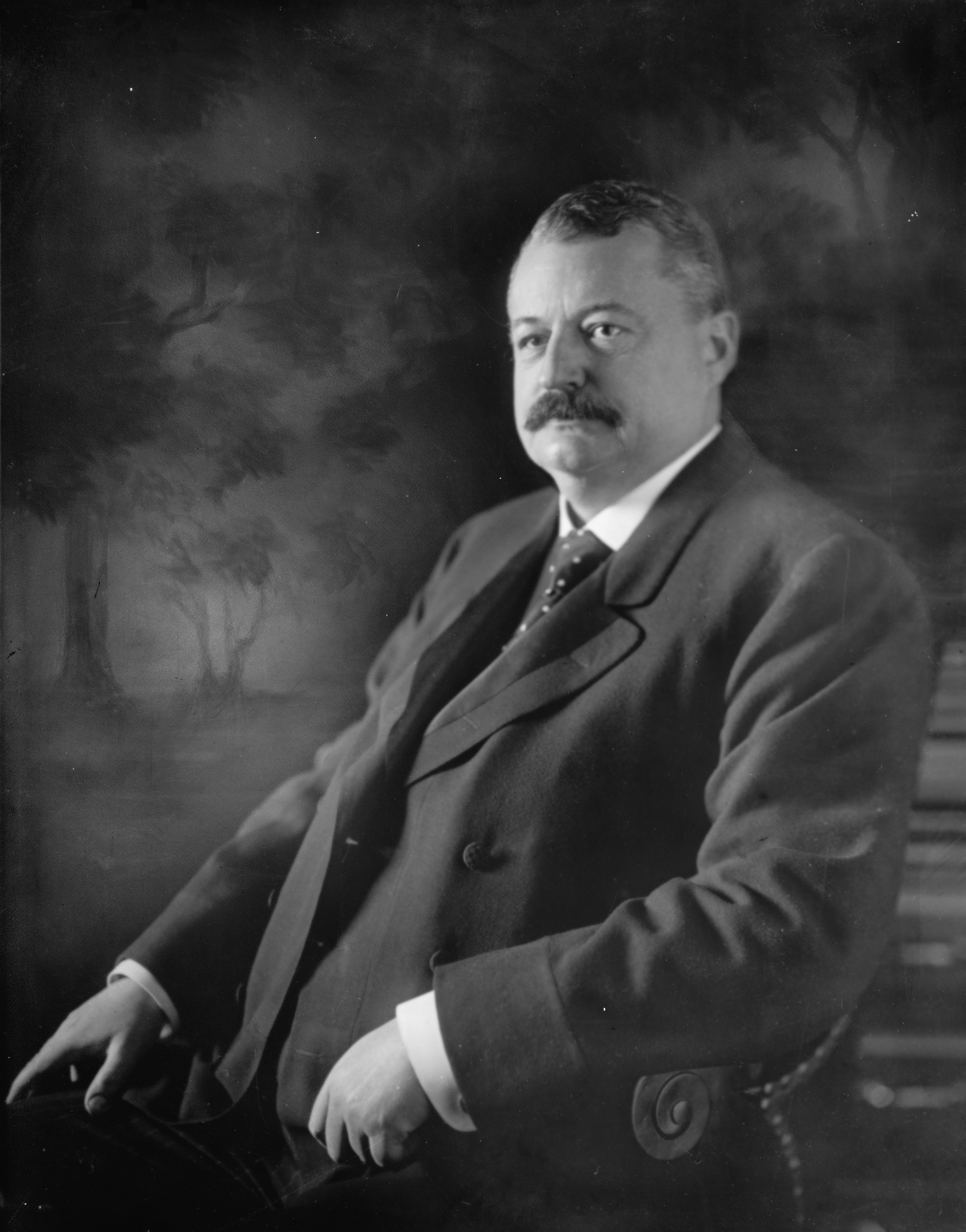
- Penrose, 1905–1921

United States Senator from Pennsylvania
- In office March 4, 1897 – December 31, 1921
- Preceded by: J. Donald Cameron
- Succeeded by: George Pepper
Committee chairmanships
Chair of the Senate Finance Committee
In office March 4, 1919 – December 31, 1921
Preceded by	F. M. Simmons
Succeeded by	Porter J. McCumber
In office March 4, 1911 – March 3, 1913
Preceded by	Nelson W. Aldrich
Succeeded by	F. M. Simmons
Chair of the Senate Education Committee
In office March 4, 1905 – March 18, 1905
Preceded by	Louis McComas
Succeeded by	Jonathan P. Dolliver
Party positions
Member of the Republican National Committee from Pennsylvania
In office May 18, 1916 – December 31, 1921
Preceded by	Henry Wasson
Succeeded by	George Pepper
In office June 9, 1904 – May 1, 1912
Preceded by	Matthew Quay
Succeeded by	Henry Wasson
Chairman of the Pennsylvania Republican Party
In office May 27, 1903 – April 26, 1905
Preceded by	Matthew Quay
Succeeded by	Wesley Andrews

President pro tempore of the Pennsylvania Senate
- In office May 9, 1889 – May 28, 1891
- Preceded by: John Grady
- Succeeded by: John P. S. Gobin

Member of the Pennsylvania Senate from the 6th district
- In office January 4, 1887 – January 27, 1897
- Preceded by: Robert Adams, Jr.
- Succeeded by: Israel Wilson Durham

Member of the Pennsylvania House of Representatives from the Philadelphia County district
- In office January 6, 1885 – June 12, 1885

Personal details
- Born: November 1, 1860 Philadelphia, Pennsylvania, U.S.
- Died: December 31, 1921 (aged 61) Washington D.C., U.S.
- Resting place: Laurel Hill Cemetery, Philadelphia, Pennsylvania, U.S.
- Party: Republican

Boies Penrose (November 1, 1860 – December 31, 1921) was an American politician from Philadelphia, Pennsylvania, who served as a Republican member of the United States Senate for Pennsylvania from 1897 to 1921. He served as a member of the Pennsylvania House of Representatives for the Philadelphia County district in 1885. He served as a member of the Pennsylvania State Senate for the 6th district in 1897 and as President pro tempore of the Pennsylvania Senate from 1889 to 1891.

Penrose was the fourth political boss of the Pennsylvania Republican political machine (known under his bossism as the Penrose machine), following Simon Cameron, Donald Cameron, and Matthew Quay. He was the most powerful political operative in Pennsylvania for 17 years, supported Warren Harding in his nomination for U.S. president, and added the oil depletion allowance into the Revenue Act of 1913 to benefit oil producers. Penrose was the longest-serving U.S. Senator from Pennsylvania until Arlen Specter surpassed his record in 2005.

== Early life and education ==
He was born on November 1, 1860, in Philadelphia, one of seven sons, to Dr. Richard Alexander Fullerton Penrose and Sarah Hannah Boies.

Penrose was born into a prominent Old Philadelphian family of Cornish descent. The family traced their American origins to Bartholomew Penrose, a Bristol shipbuilder, who was invited by William Penn to establish a shipyard in the Province of Pennsylvania. He was a grandson of Speaker of the Pennsylvania Senate Charles B. Penrose and brother of gynecologist Charles Bingham Penrose and mining entrepreneurs Richard and Spencer Penrose. He was a descendant of the prominent Biddle family of Philadelphia.

Penrose attended Episcopal Academy and Harvard University. He was almost expelled from Harvard due to poor academics but was able to improve his grades by Senior year. He graduated second in his class in 1881. After reading the law with the firm of Wayne MacVeagh and George Tucker Bispham, he was admitted to the Pennsylvania Bar in 1883.

== Career ==
=== Pennsylvania legislature ===
He served as a member of the Pennsylvania House of Representatives for Philadelphia County in 1885, and was elected to the Pennsylvania State Senate for the 6th district in 1886. He served as president pro tempore from 1889 to 1891. At the age of 26, he was the youngest state senator and at age 29, the youngest President pro tempore.

Although Penrose wrote two books on political reform, he joined the political machine of Matthew Quay, a Pennsylvania Republican political boss. In 1895, Penrose ran unsuccessfully for mayor of Philadelphia. He was forced to withdraw from the race when his Democrat opponent released a photo of Penrose leaving a brothel at three o'clock in the morning.

=== U.S. Senate and National Republican Party Committee ===
In 1897, the state legislature elected Penrose to the United States Senate over John Wanamaker.

Penrose was a dominant member of the Senate Finance Committee and supported high protective tariffs. He had also served on the United States Senate Committee on Banking, United States Senate Committee on Naval Affairs, United States Senate Committee on Post Office and Post Roads, United States Senate Committee on Education and Labor, and United States Senate Committee on Immigration. One of Penrose's most important legislative actions was adding the oil depletion allowance to the Revenue Act of 1913 which benefited oil producers including the Mellons and the Pews. Penrose consistently supported "pro-business" policies, and opposed labor reform and women's rights.

He created the development of "squeeze bills", in which he would have Pennsylvania colleagues enter bills into the Pennsylvania legislature that were negative toward major industries, such as railroads and banks, and promised to remove the bills after receiving sufficient political contributions from those industries.

Penrose was elected Chairman of the Pennsylvania Republican Party in 1903, succeeding fellow Senator Matthew Quay. A year later, Quay died, and Penrose was appointed to succeed him as the state's Republican National Committeeman. He was the most powerful political operative in Pennsylvania for the next 17 years and enabled figures like Richard Baldwin to advance through loyalty to his organization.

In the 1912 presidential election, Penrose strongly supported incumbent President William Howard Taft over former President Theodore Roosevelt. To discredit Roosevelt in the three-way race that year, Penrose worked with Roosevelt's embittered Progressive rival, Robert M. La Follette, to establish a Senate committee to investigate sources of contributions to Roosevelt's 1904 and 1912 campaigns. After a campaign that consisted of heavy attacks on Penrose, Roosevelt won Pennsylvania in the 1912 election, although Democrat Woodrow Wilson won the national vote. Penrose was also a major supporter of Warren Harding, and helped the Ohio Senator win the 1920 Republican nomination. Penrose's role in Harding's election helped earn Pennsylvanian Andrew W. Mellon the role of Secretary of the Treasury.

In 1912, Penrose was forced out of power by the progressive faction of the party led by William Flinn. Penrose did not stand for re-election to his national committee post. However, following Flinn's departure from the party to support Theodore Roosevelt's Progressive Party, Penrose was able to garner enough support to return to his post as national committeeman and would remain in the position until his death.

In 1914, Penrose faced his first direct election (following the passage of the Seventeenth Amendment). He publicly campaigned for the first time in his life and defeated Democrat A. Mitchell Palmer and Progressive Gifford Pinchot.

In November 1915, Penrose accompanied the Liberty Bell on its nationwide tour to the Panama-Pacific International Exposition in San Francisco to raise money for World War I.

== Personal life ==
Penrose was six foot four inches tall and was nicknamed "Big Grizzly". He had a huge appetite and was known to have a dozen eggs at breakfast and a full turkey at lunch. He won a $1,000 bet in an eating contest of 50 oysters and a quart of bourbon that sent his opponent to the hospital. He did not like people watching him eat and had screens set up to provide privacy when he dined at the Bellevue-Stratford Hotel in Philadelphia.

An avid outdoorsman, Penrose enjoyed mountain exploration and big-game hunting. He was one of the 100 original members of the Boone and Crockett Club. According to his hunting guide, W.G. (Bill) Manson, they had to spend a lot of time to find a horse big enough to carry Penrose and his custom saddle. The horse was called "Senator." After Penrose stopped riding, the horse was retired to pasture because no standard saddle would fit him.

He never married and was known to boast of his love of prostitutes, stating that he didn't "believe in hypocrisy".

In 1903, Penrose, along with his brothers and father, invested in the formation of the Utah Copper Company.

== Death ==
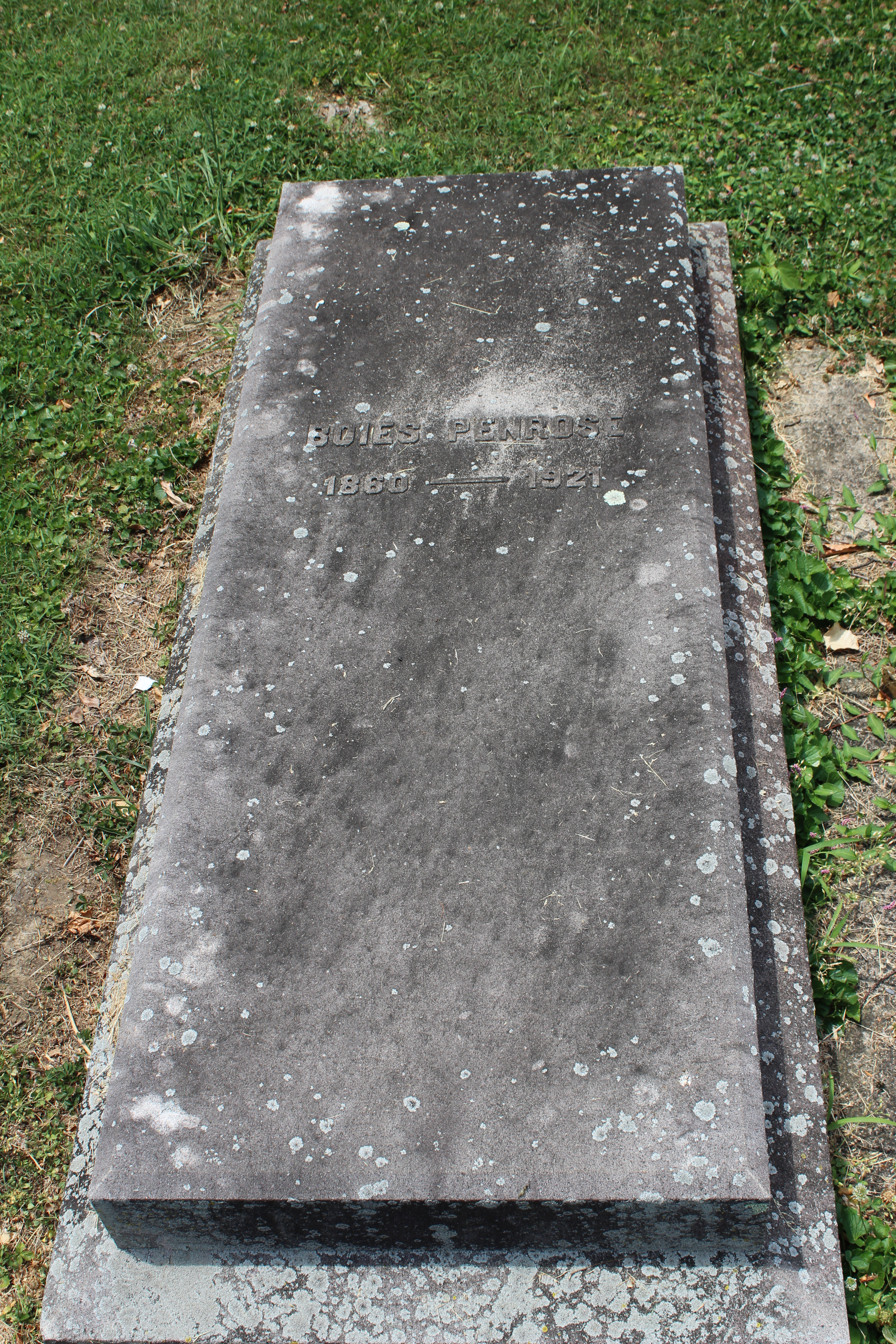
Penrose's tombstone in Laurel Hill Cemetery

Penrose died on December 31, 1921, in his Wardman Park penthouse suite in Washington, D.C. in the last hour of 1921, after suffering a pulmonary thrombosis. He was interred in the Penrose family grave section of Laurel Hill Cemetery in Philadelphia.

== Legacy ==
Following Penrose's death, his lieutenant Joseph Grundy became one of the leaders of the Republican machine, but no one boss dominated the party as Penrose and his predecessors had.

Mount Penrose in the Dickson Range in southwest-central British Columbia is named after Penrose.

A bronze statue of Penrose by Philadelphia sculptor Samuel Murray was erected in Harrisburg, Pennsylvania's Capitol Park in September 1930.

== Publications ==
- Philadelphia 1681-1887: A History of Municipal Development, Baltimore: Johns Hopkins University, 1887
- The City Government of Philadelphia - Volume 5, Baltimore: Johns Hopkins University, 1887
- Ground Rents in Philadelphia, Philadelphia: Porter & Coates, 1888
- Revenue Bill of 1918: Speech of Hon. Boies Penrose of Pennsylvania in the United States Senate, Washington, 1918

== See also ==
- List of members of the United States Congress who died in office (1900–1949)

U.S. Senate
Preceded by J. Donald Cameron	U.S. senator (Class 3) from Pennsylvania; 1897–1921; Served alongside: Matthew Quay, Philander Knox, George Oliver, William Crow	Succeeded by George Pepper
Political offices
Preceded by Nelson Aldrich; Rhode Island	Chairman of the U.S. Senate Committee on Finance; 1911–1913	Succeeded by Furnifold Simmons; North Carolina
Preceded by Furnifold Simmons; North Carolina	Chairman of the U.S. Senate Committee on Finance; 1919–1921	Succeeded by Porter McCumber; North Dakota
Preceded by John Grady	President pro tempore of the Pennsylvania Senate; 1889–1891	Succeeded by John P. S. Gobin
Pennsylvania State Senate
Preceded by Robert Adams, Jr.	Member of the Pennsylvania Senate for the 6th District; 1887–1897	Succeeded by Israel Wilson Durham
Party political offices
Preceded by Matthew Quay	Member of the Republican National Committee from Pennsylvania; 1904–1912	Succeeded by Henry Wasson
Preceded by Matthew Quay	Chairman of the Pennsylvania Republican Party; 1903–1905	Succeeded by Wesley Andrews
Preceded by Henry Wasson	Member of the Republican National Committee from Pennsylvania; 1916–1921	Succeeded by George Pepper
Preceded by None^{1}	Republican nominee for U.S. Senator from Pennsylvania (Class 3); 1914, 1920	Succeeded by George Pepper
Notes and references
1. The 1914 election marked the first time that all seats up for election were popularly elected instead of chosen by their state legislatures.
